= Tarbes =

Prefecture and commune in Hautes-Pyrénées, Occitanie, France

Tarbes Tarba (Occitan)
- Prefecture and commune
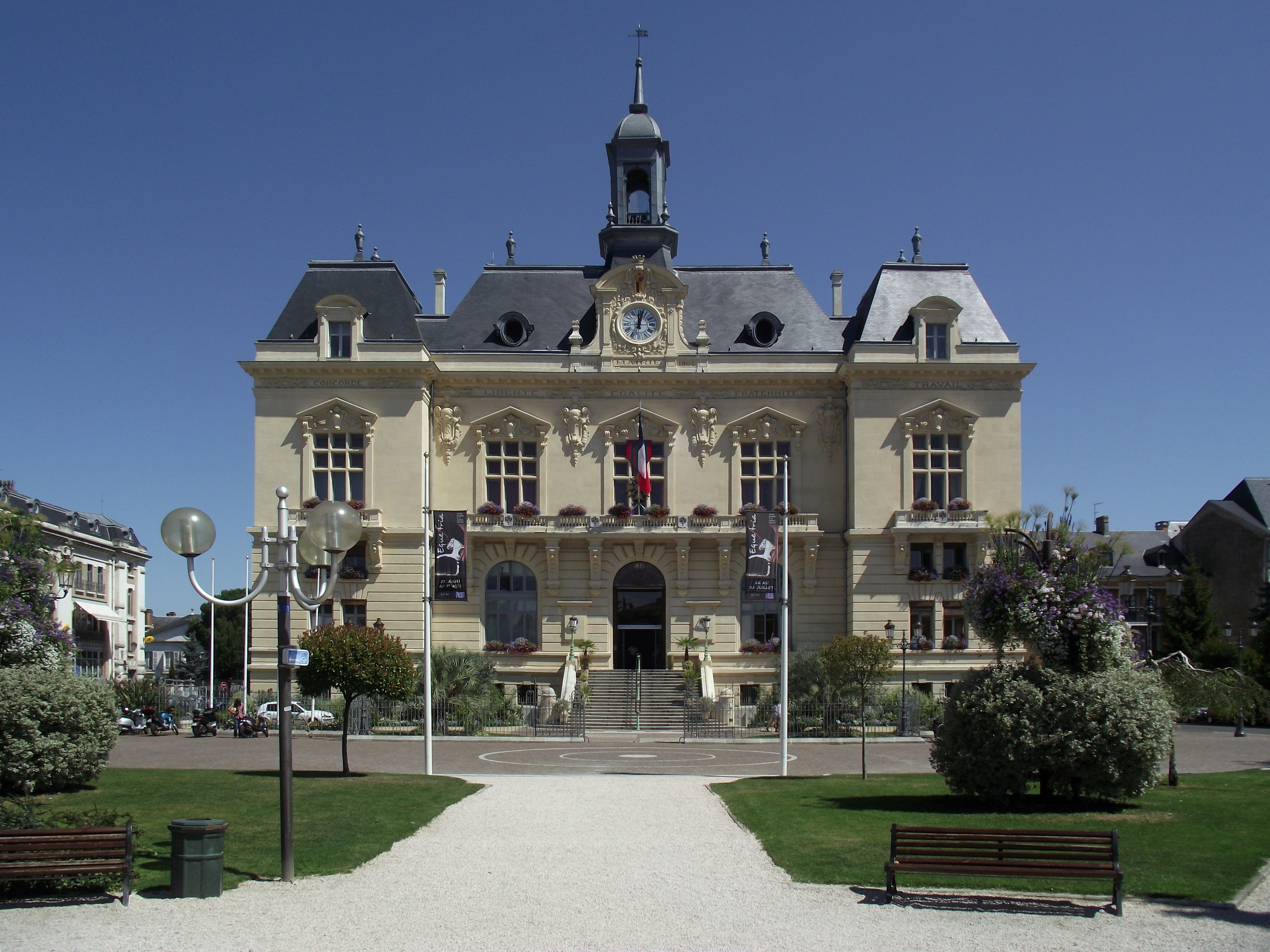
- The Hôtel de Ville

- Coat of arms
- Location of Tarbes
- Location within France Location within Occitanie
- Coordinates: 43°14′N 0°04′E
- Country: France
- Region: Occitania
- Department: Hautes-Pyrénées
- Arrondissement: Tarbes
- Canton: 3 cantons
- Intercommunality: CA Tarbes-Lourdes-Pyrénées

Government
  - Mayor (2020–2026): Gérard Trémège (LR)
- Area^{1}: 15.33 km^{2} (5.92 sq mi)
- Elevation: 304 m (997 ft)
- Highest elevation: 326 m (1,070 ft)
- Lowest elevation: 284 m (932 ft)
- Population (2023): 44,399
  - Density: 2,896/km^{2} (7,501/sq mi)
- Time zone: UTC+01:00 (CET)
  - Summer (DST): UTC+02:00 (CEST)
- INSEE/Postal code: 65440 /65000
- ^{1} French Land Register data, which excludes lakes, ponds, glaciers > 1 km^{2} (0.386 sq mi or 247 acres) and river estuaries.

Tarbes (French pronunciation: [taʁb]; Gascon: Tarba) is a commune in the Hautes-Pyrénées department in the Occitanie region of southwestern France. It is the capital of Bigorre and of the Hautes-Pyrénées. It has been a commune since 1790. It was known as Turba or Tarba in Roman times. Tarbes is part of the historical region of Gascony.

Formerly of strong industrial tradition, Tarbes today tries to diversify its activities, particularly in aeronautics and high tech around the different zones of activities which are increasing. The recent development of Tarbais beans and other regional specialties also shows a willingness to develop the agri-food industry thus justifying its nickname of "market town". Its 42,888 inhabitants are called Tarbaises and the Tarbais.

It is the seat of the diocese of Tarbes-et-Lourdes. The 1st Parachute Hussar Regiment and 35th Parachute Artillery Regiment are stationed in Tarbes.

== Geography ==
=== Location ===
Location of Tarbes in the Pyrenees

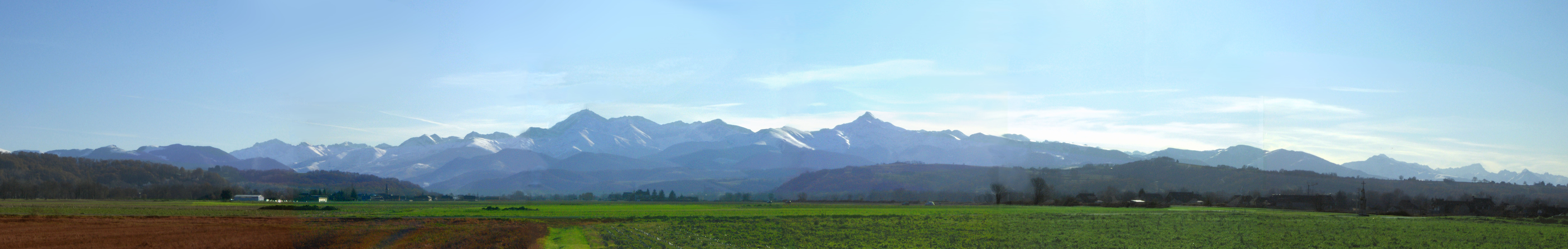
The Pyrenees seen from Tarbes.

Tarbes is a Pre-Pyrenees town within the rich agricultural plain of the river Adour, 155 kilometres (96 miles) southwest of Toulouse, 144 kilometres (89 miles) to the east of Bayonne, 70 kilometres (43 miles) southwest of Auch and 20 kilometres (12 miles) northeast of Lourdes. Tarbes is 1 hr 30 mins from the Atlantic Ocean, 2 hrs 50 mins from the Languedoc coast and 35 minutes from the nearest ski resorts. It is located at an average elevation of 304 metres (997 feet).

To the south of Tarbes, along with the pilgrimage town of Lourdes, is the border with Spain. The Pyrenees mountains, lying along the border between France and Spain, can be seen from the town.

=== Hydrography ===
Tarbes is crossed to the east by the Adour river and to the west by the Échez and by the Gespe, a tributary which joins the Échez on the territory of the commune.

=== Neighbouring communes ===
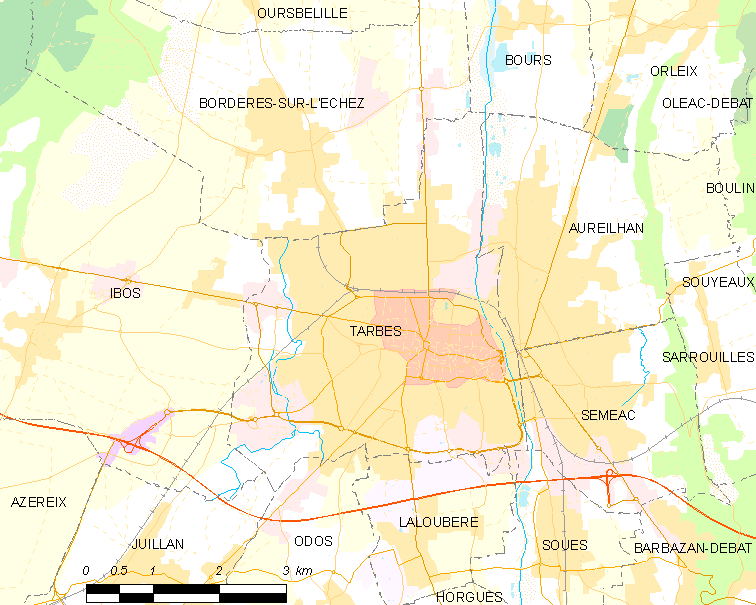
Map of the commune of Tarbes and its adjacent communes

=== Climate ===
Tarbes features an oceanic climate (Köppen climate classification: Cfb), with relatively hot summers, mild winters and abundant rainfall. Tarbes benefits from its privileged location in the area of the Adour, a milder microclimate than at Lourdes, from a higher altitude, and somewhat less rainy than in Pau, and sunnier. Summers are warm and often stormy, while spring is rainy and cool and autumn is mild and sunny. Winter, meanwhile, is less rigorous but can still hold some surprises. The lowest temperature was recorded in January 1985 with a temperature under shelter of −17.9 °C (−0.2 °F). Conversely, there was a maximum temperature of 39.9 °C (104 °F) in August 2025.

Location	Sunshine	Rain	Snow	Storm	Fog
Paris	1,630 hrs/yr	642 millimetres (25.3 in)/yr	15 days/yr	19 days/yr	13 days/yr
Nice	2,694 hrs/yr	767 millimetres (30.2 in)/yr	1 day/yr	31 days/yr	1 day/yr
Toulouse	2,010 hrs/yr	656 millimetres (25.8 in)/yr	7 days/yr	26 days/yr	44 days/yr
Pau	1,850 hrs/yr	1,069 millimetres (42.1 in)/yr	6 days/yr	27 days/yr	42 days/yr
Tarbes	1,940 hrs/yr	975 millimetres (38.4 in)/yr	9 days/yr	29 days/yr	31 days/yr
National average	1,973 hrs/yr	770 millimetres (30 in)/yr	14 days/yr	22 days/yr	40 days/yr

Climate data for Tarbes, France (altitude 360m, 1991−2020 normals, extremes 1946−present)
Month	Jan	Feb	Mar	Apr	May	Jun	Jul	Aug	Sep	Oct	Nov	Dec	Year
Record high °C (°F)	23.0 (73.4)	29.2 (84.6)	29.1 (84.4)	30.5 (86.9)	34.1 (93.4)	39.2 (102.6)	38.8 (101.8)	39.9 (103.8)	37.3 (99.1)	33.8 (92.8)	27.6 (81.7)	26.1 (79.0)	39.2 (102.6)
Mean daily maximum °C (°F)	10.5 (50.9)	11.5 (52.7)	14.6 (58.3)	16.5 (61.7)	19.9 (67.8)	23.3 (73.9)	25.2 (77.4)	25.7 (78.3)	23.0 (73.4)	19.3 (66.7)	13.9 (57.0)	11.4 (52.5)	17.9 (64.2)
Daily mean °C (°F)	5.8 (42.4)	6.5 (43.7)	9.2 (48.6)	11.3 (52.3)	14.9 (58.8)	18.2 (64.8)	20.1 (68.2)	20.4 (68.7)	17.5 (63.5)	14.1 (57.4)	9.1 (48.4)	6.7 (44.1)	12.8 (55.0)
Mean daily minimum °C (°F)	1.1 (34.0)	1.5 (34.7)	3.8 (38.8)	6.0 (42.8)	9.8 (49.6)	13.2 (55.8)	15.1 (59.2)	15.1 (59.2)	12.0 (53.6)	8.8 (47.8)	4.4 (39.9)	1.9 (35.4)	7.7 (45.9)
Record low °C (°F)	−17.9 (−0.2)	−14.4 (6.1)	−9.8 (14.4)	−3.4 (25.9)	−1.8 (28.8)	2.3 (36.1)	5.9 (42.6)	5.3 (41.5)	0.7 (33.3)	−3.3 (26.1)	−9.6 (14.7)	−13.4 (7.9)	−17.9 (−0.2)
Average precipitation mm (inches)	99.1 (3.90)	82.9 (3.26)	84.4 (3.32)	111.6 (4.39)	110.6 (4.35)	80.9 (3.19)	70.9 (2.79)	67.4 (2.65)	73.6 (2.90)	82.5 (3.25)	120.8 (4.76)	96.3 (3.79)	1,081 (42.56)
Average precipitation days (≥ 1.0 mm)	10.6	9.7	10.3	12.5	12.5	9.7	7.9	8.3	8.7	9.9	11.4	10.1	121.6
Average snowy days	2.2	2.1	1.7	0.6	0.0	0.0	0.0	0.0	0.0	0.0	0.9	1.7	9.2
Average relative humidity (%)	81	78	76	77	78	78	77	79	78	81	82	82	78.9
Mean monthly sunshine hours	114.2	129.3	168.6	170.4	188.8	196.3	206.9	207.6	194.9	156.1	118.3	112.1	1,963.5
Source 1: Météo France
Source 2: Infoclimat.fr (humidity and snowy days, 1961–1990)

== Toponymy ==
The name of the town was recorded in the 5th century as Civitas Turba ubi castrum Bigòrra (The town of Turba (possibly 'of the crowd') where the castle of Bigòrra is located). It was an important town in Novempopulania, one of the Roman provinces at that time. In the 6th century Gregory of Tours referred to it as Talvam vicum. In the Middle Ages it was called Tarbé (1214), Tursa, Tarvia (1284) and also Tarbia. Not to be confused with the Tarbelli, whose capital was Dax.

=== Legendary origin of the name ===
Legend holds that the Queen of Ethiopia, Tarbis, proposed her love to Moses and that he refused. Inconsolable, she decided to leave her throne and hide her disappointment. After many wanderings, she arrived in Bigorre and built her home on the Adour to found the town of Tarbes, and its sister, on the banks of the Gave de Pau, arose as Lourdes.

== History ==
=== Antiquity ===
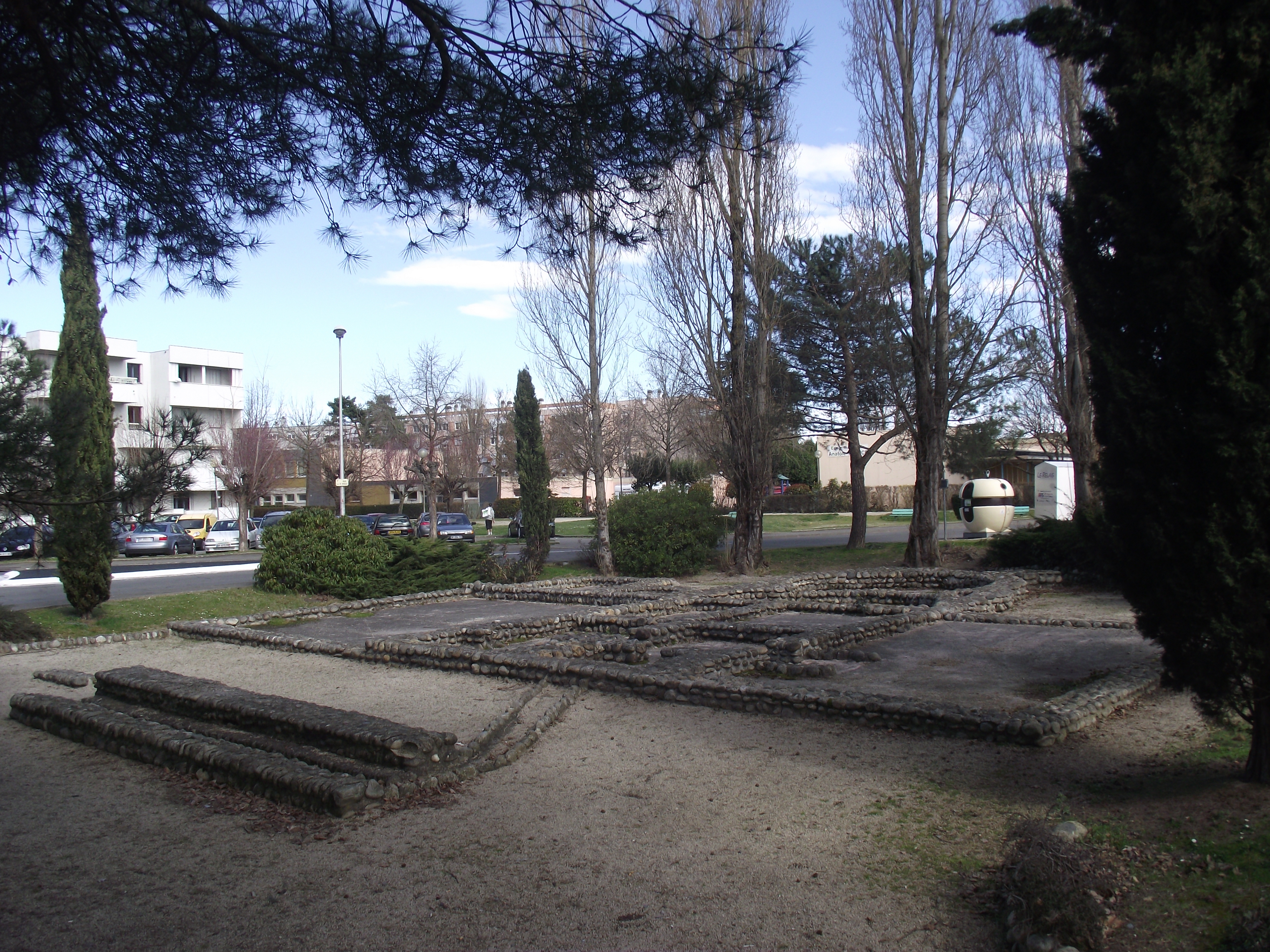
Foundations of an old villa in the Ormeau quarter

In the 3rd century BC, the foundations of Tarbes began to emerge, based on the testimonies of the exhumed remains which had been buried. By need for salt trade, merchants who were likely Aquitanians travelled across the Pyrenean foothills. To continue their journey, they had to use a ford in order to cross the Adour which descended from the mountain. It was more prudent to split the loads to cross the ford as a result of which a pause was necessary. The bottom of the valley was dominated by a sandy emergence which prompted people to settle there.

Then, Tarba experienced a Roman colonisation and acquired ancient villas and large agricultural estates, found particularly in the Ormeau quarter. The existence of craft has been verified by the remains of the workshops of potters and weavers. The urban core, meanwhile, assumed the administrative functions and would have had an early Christian church in the 4th century.

=== Middle Ages ===
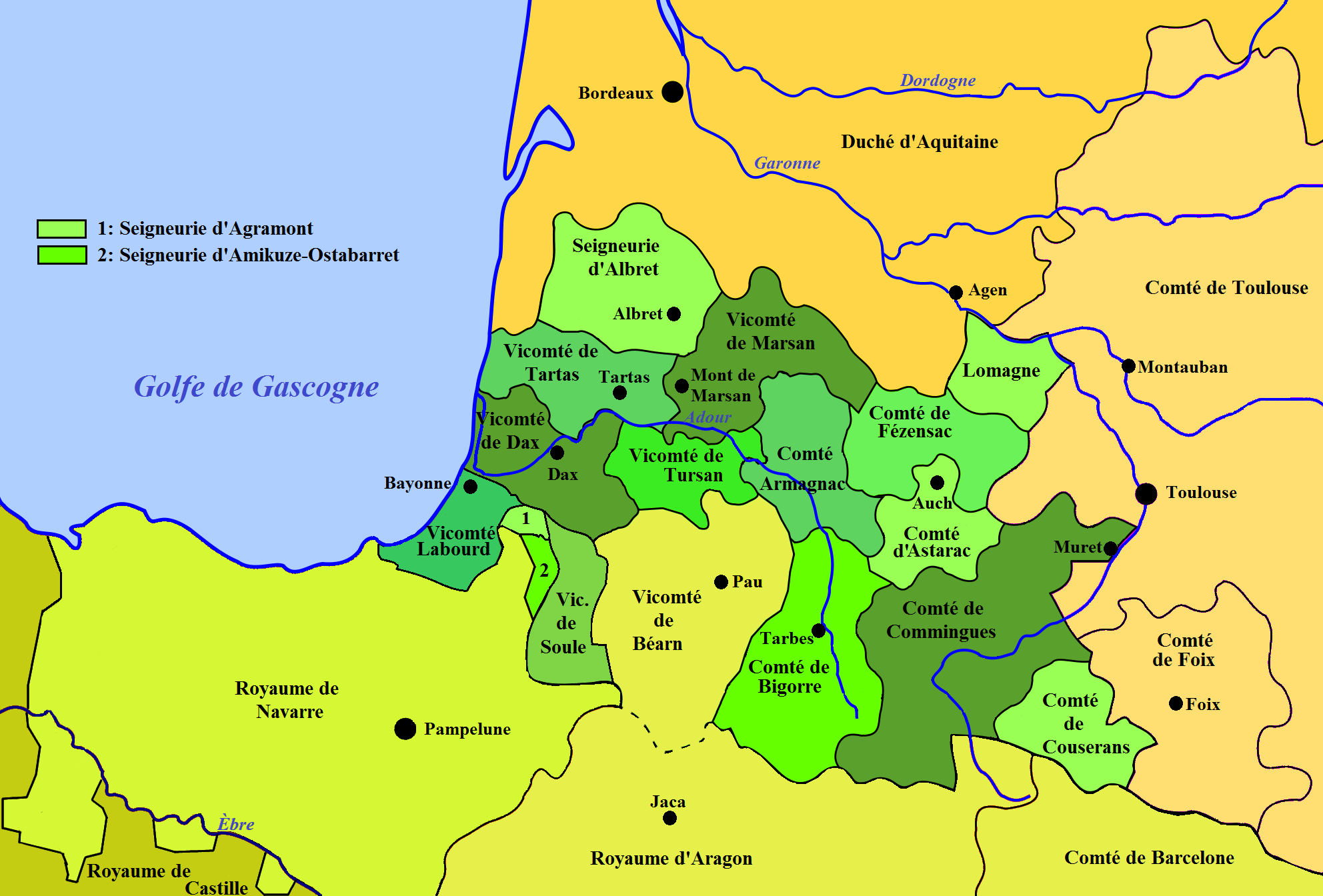
Map of the fiefs of Gascony around 1150

In the 5th and 6th centuries, as a result of the barbarian invasions which swept in successive waves, the city shrank around the castrum, of which a remnant remains in the rear courtyard of the prefecture.

In about 840 AD, the Vikings led a devastating raid following which the Bishop of Bigorre reported that the city Bigorre was beginning with the cathedral, named with originality, la Sède.

At the end of the 12th century, the count of Bigorre settled in his castle of Tarbes, resulting with the court of justice being in his suite. Then, the capital of Bigorre received a Royal Seneschal.

Two noble houses were founded in the 13th century, outside the walls, one the convent of the Cordeliers near Carrère Longue, the other being that of the Carmelites in the vicinity of the Bourg Crabé.

At the end of the medieval centuries, the city was composed of six separate fortified towns, juxtaposed and aligned on an east–west axis, where the original core was ordered around the cathedral. There were thus la Sède, Carrère, Maubourguet and Bourg Vieux flanked to the east of the Count's castle, with Bourg Neuf and Bourg Crabé each surrounded by their own walls.

During the Wars of Religion, in 1569, the troops of Jeanne d'Albret burned the cathedral, the convents and other churches as well as the bishopric. Despite the strategic destruction to try to defend Bourg Vieux, the inhabitants were massacred.

=== Early Modern era ===
In the 17th century, after the plague and the problems of housing people of war, Tarbes ensured its revival with the reconstruction of the Episcopal Palace in 1652 (today the office of the prefecture), the foundation of a third hospital in 1690 and two new convents (Capuchins and Ursulines). Irrigation of the land and the water power used by the craftsmen were produced by the system of canals derived from the Adour.

The 18th century announced a growth of the population, and the development of agriculture, crafts and trade. The town expanded and new quarters appeared (such as the current Rue Maréchal-Foch). Then, the Constituent Assembly, which included Bertrand Barère de Vieuzac (Deputy of Bigorre to the Estates-General), decided to undertake administrative reform and Tarbes benefitted by becoming capital of the department of the Hautes-Pyrénées.

=== 19th century ===
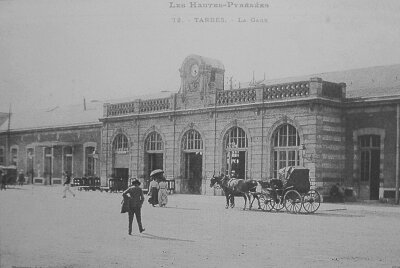
The Gare de Tarbes, around 1900

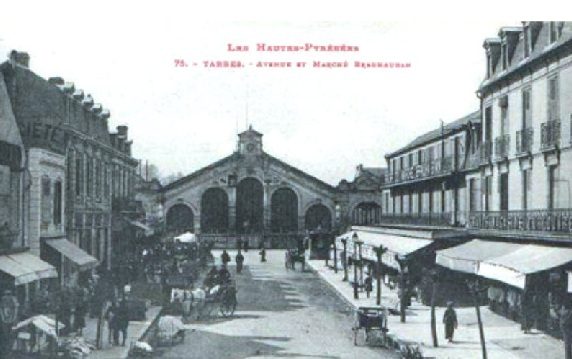
Brauhauban market, around 1900

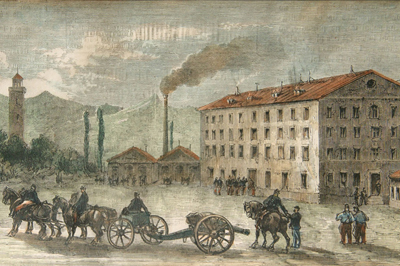
An old image of the arsenal

==== Prerogatives of a chef-lieu ====
From 1800, Tarbes became the chef-lieu and headquarters of a prefecture (an increase of its administrative role and its functions). In 1806, Napoleon I re-established the National Stud of Tarbes and Tarbes gave birth to the Anglo-Arabian horse breed. In 1859, Tarbes was connected to Paris by rail.

==== Legacy ====
In the 19th century, various legacies enrich the public spaces of Tarbes. In 1853, Placide Massey bequeathed to the city the eponymous garden, still unfinished. In 1877, a donation by the former Mayor Antoine Brauhauban was responsible for the construction of an imposing hall which bore his name (this building was destroyed in 1970 to establish outdoor parking). The end of the 19th century still saw the construction of the two fountains of Place Marcadieu, a legacy of the benefactor Félicitée Duvignau.

==== Industrial development ====
After the Franco-Prussian War of 1870–1871, General Verchère de Reffye transformed the experimental workshop of Meudon, which was transferred by train to Tarbes, into a fully-fledged artillery workshop (called an arsenal by the townspeople). Thus, Tarbes became an industrial and working-class town but also asserted its military vocation by the construction of the Larrey, Soult and Reffye neighbourhoods. Today Les Forges de Tarbes still produce artillery shells for the French Army's Leclerc MBT and CAESAR self-propelled howitzer. The firm, which in March 2024 produced around 4,000 artillery shells per month, was privatized in 2021. The goal is to augment that number by a factor of three, come 2025.

=== 20th century ===
The Hôtel de Ville was completed in 1906.

During World War I, Tarbes intensified its production of artillery by virtue of its geographical position in the back country. Marshal Foch, Commander-in-Chief of all allied armies, was born in Tarbes in 1851.

During World War II, the Resistance was also part of the everyday life of the town of Tarbes, which was awarded the Croix de Guerre.

After the return of peace, the industry diversified and there was an expansion of the population. Tarbes remained a city of strong military character.

=== 21st century ===
Today, Tarbes has also become a university city and the main activities are now within the tertiary sector (services). In addition to its privileged geographical situation, less than an hour from the Pyrenees mountains, two hours from the Atlantic Ocean and three hours from the Mediterranean via the La Pyrénéenne autoroute, the city offers a certain lifestyle and boasts a cultural life which is packed with clubs and sport.

=== Heraldry ===
Arms of Tarbes	The arms of Tarbes are blazoned: "Quarterly or and gules."

== Economy ==
Being farther away from Toulouse than other cities the former region of Midi-Pyrénées, Tarbes may appear to display greater economic independence. It also often occupies the second place in the regional urban hierarchy. It maintains close relations with Nouvelle-Aquitaine and, in particular, with Pau, a nearby town of the Pre-Pyrenees.

=== Industry ===
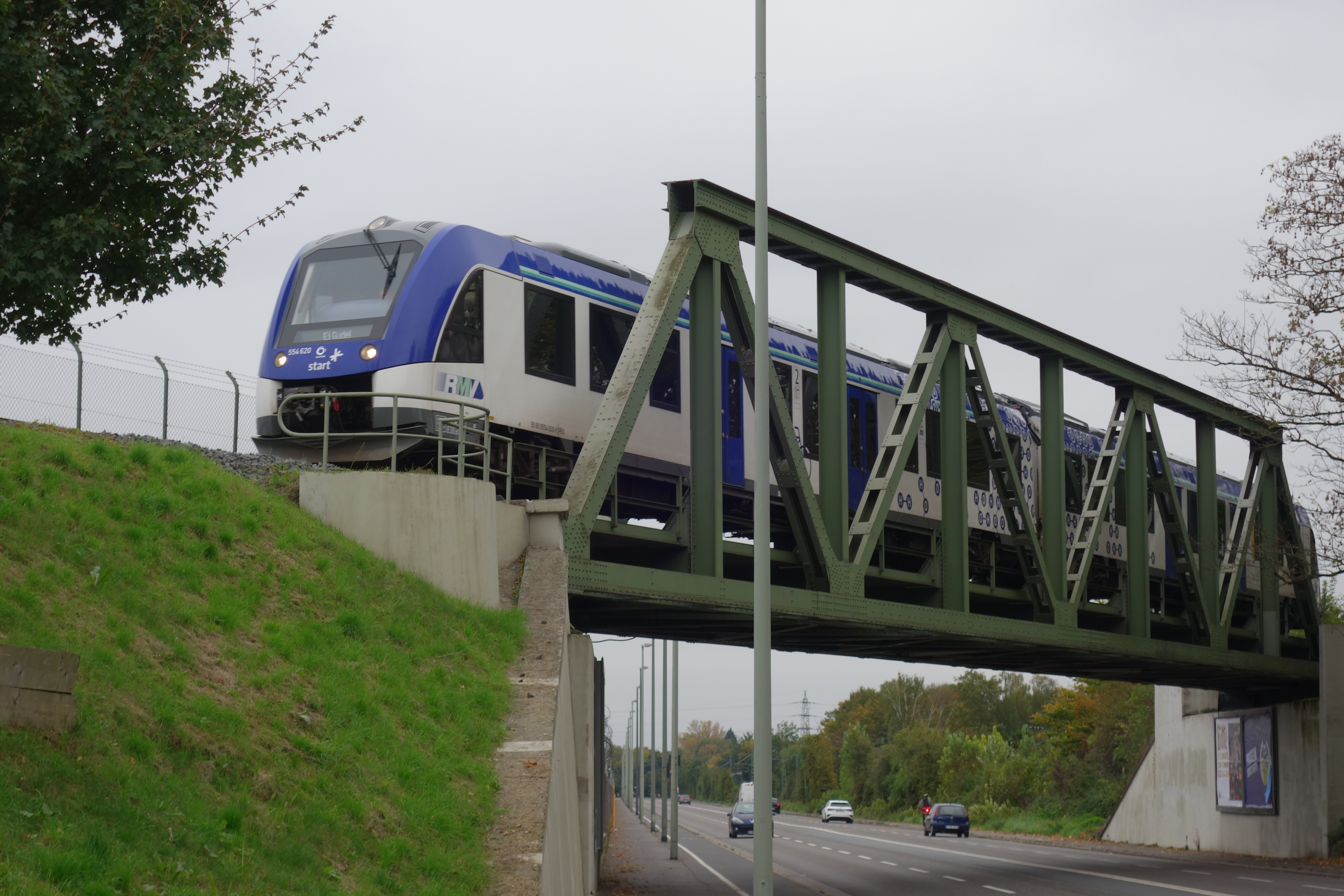
Co-developed in Tarbes: iLint by Alstom, the first hydrogen-powered passenger train in service

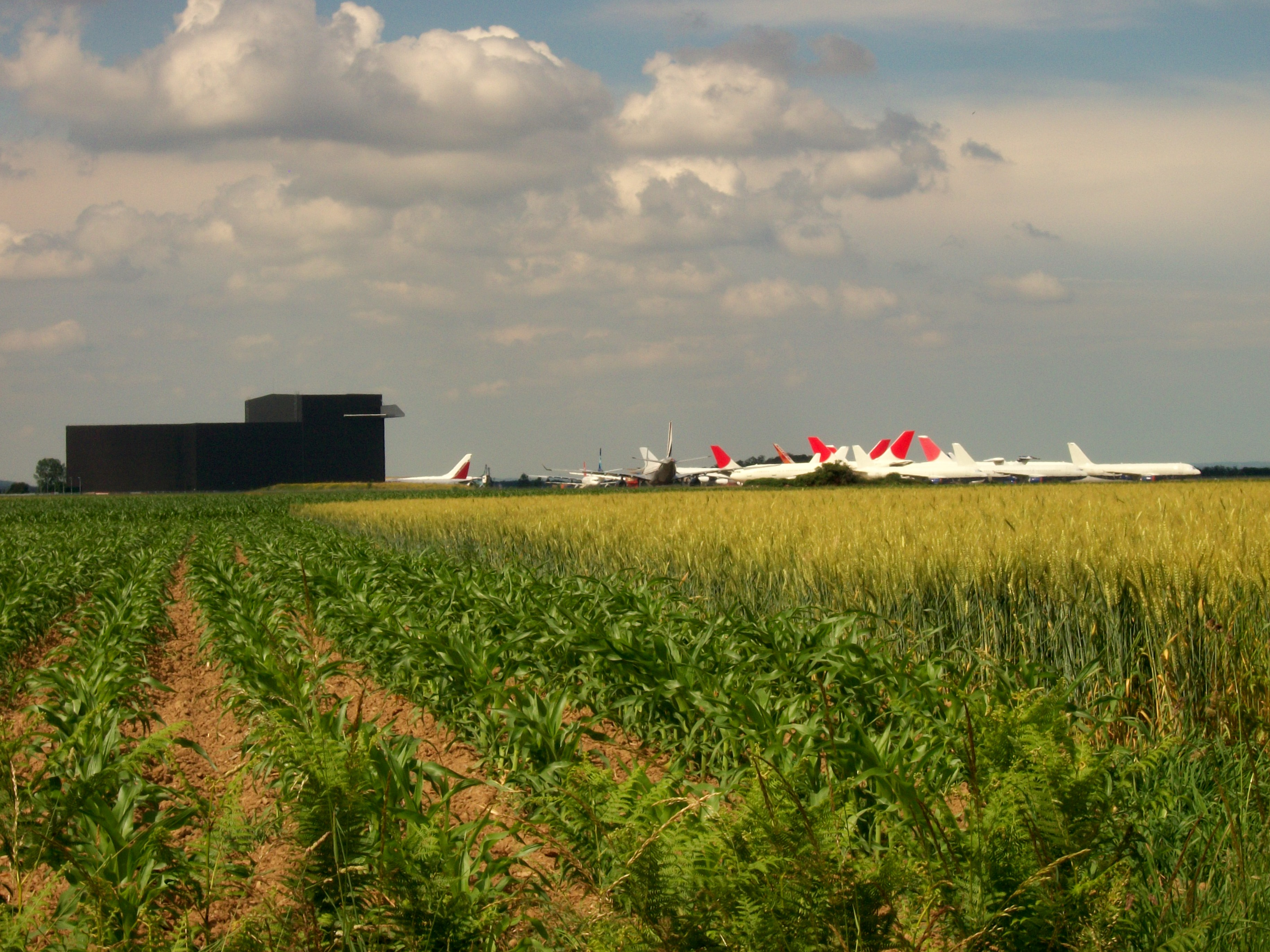
TARMAC and the fields around Ossun.

Tarbes is the second industrial city of the former region of Midi-Pyrénées. this is particularly illustrated in the field of railway construction and aeronautics with the presence of nearby companies such as Alstom and Daher. On this site, Alstom took part in the development of the iLint, the first hydrogen-powered passenger train in service.

Daher-Socata manufactures business and tourism aircraft there, including the TBM 850 and TB 20. Its headquarters and its main industrial site are located on the outskirts of the Tarbes-Lourdes-Pyrénées Airport in the canton of Ossun, south of Grand Tarbes, where its facilities are spread over 53 hectares (130 acres), of which 80,000 square metres (860,000 sq ft) are covered surfaces. At the end of 2006, its strength stood at more than 1,050 people.

Ossun, a neighbouring commune of the agglomeration, is also home to TARMAC, a company dedicated to the dismantling of aircraft for which it was necessary to construct an imposing building. The platform is, again, installed on the Tarbes-Lourdes-Pyrénées airport area, and revolves around the three activities of storage, maintenance and deconstruction. Boostec, based in Bazet, collaborated with EADS-Astrium to build the Herschel space telescope, launched on 14 May 2009.

=== Zones of activity ===
In addition to the Aerospace Valley involving DeciElec, Socata/Daher, Pearl and Tarmac, Tarbes is developing several business parks.

- The Park of the Pyrenees, located in Ibos, is equipped to host craft, industrial activities, services and offices.
- The Bastillac University Park is dedicated to technological research. The Park of the Adour, in Semeac, is for industrial, commercial and the tertiary sector.
- Cognac Park, on the road to Pau, is devoted to the craft and the tertiary sector.
- The Ecoparck of Bordères-sur-Echez is the subject of projects regarding energy production (biogas plant project, produced from biomass), the cold-intensive businesses (Pyrenean curing and the planned cooling platform of Dominque Sallaberry Logistics).

=== University centre ===
Tarbes also houses the second University centre of the Midi-Pyrénées with a University Institute of technology (IUT) and National School of Engineers of Tarbes (ENIT) having more than 5,000 students.

=== Tourism ===
The Tarbes–Lourdes–Pyrénées Airport is still the second of the Midi-Pyrénées. Also in the town centre, the Rex Hotel, a designer hotel addressing a rather affluent clientele, and the arrival of brands such as H&M and new places of leisure (CGR, etc.) seem to attest to the attractiveness of the town.

=== Agriculture ===
Often presented as a "market town", Tarbes is home to important halls and market squares, allowing opportunities for local agriculture. Symbol of the local food industry, a Cooperative of tarbais beans including emerged at the heart of the Bastillac zone.

== Transport ==
=== Air ===
The small Tarbes-Lourdes-Pyrénées Airport is situated 10 kilometres (6.2 mi) from the town centre. This airport is served by HOP! which provides three daily and two weekend air services to Paris-Orly. Jetairfly, which ensures a connection of two flights a week during the summer. Ryanair serves London Stansted, Dublin, Lisbon and Milan Bergamo, with two and three flights a week, respectively. The airport also offers seasonal charter flights to and from the largest European cities. The nearest major airport to Tarbes is Toulouse Blagnac Airport, located 158 km (98 mi) north east from the town centre. The airport provides more domestic and international destinations.

=== Rail ===
The Gare de Tarbes railway station offers direct connections with Paris, Bordeaux, Toulouse, Bayonne and several regional destinations.

=== Road ===
Tarbes is also served by the A64 allowing in the direction of Toulouse, to drive freely to Lannemezan or Capvern, and towards Bayonne and joining Pau, which is also accessible from the RD 817.

=== Public transport ===
The communes of Grand Tarbes are served by a bus network called Alezan. An electric shuttle for the town centre. Finally, it is possible to rent cycles in the Place du Foirail, under the Vél'en Ville system.

== Politics and administration ==
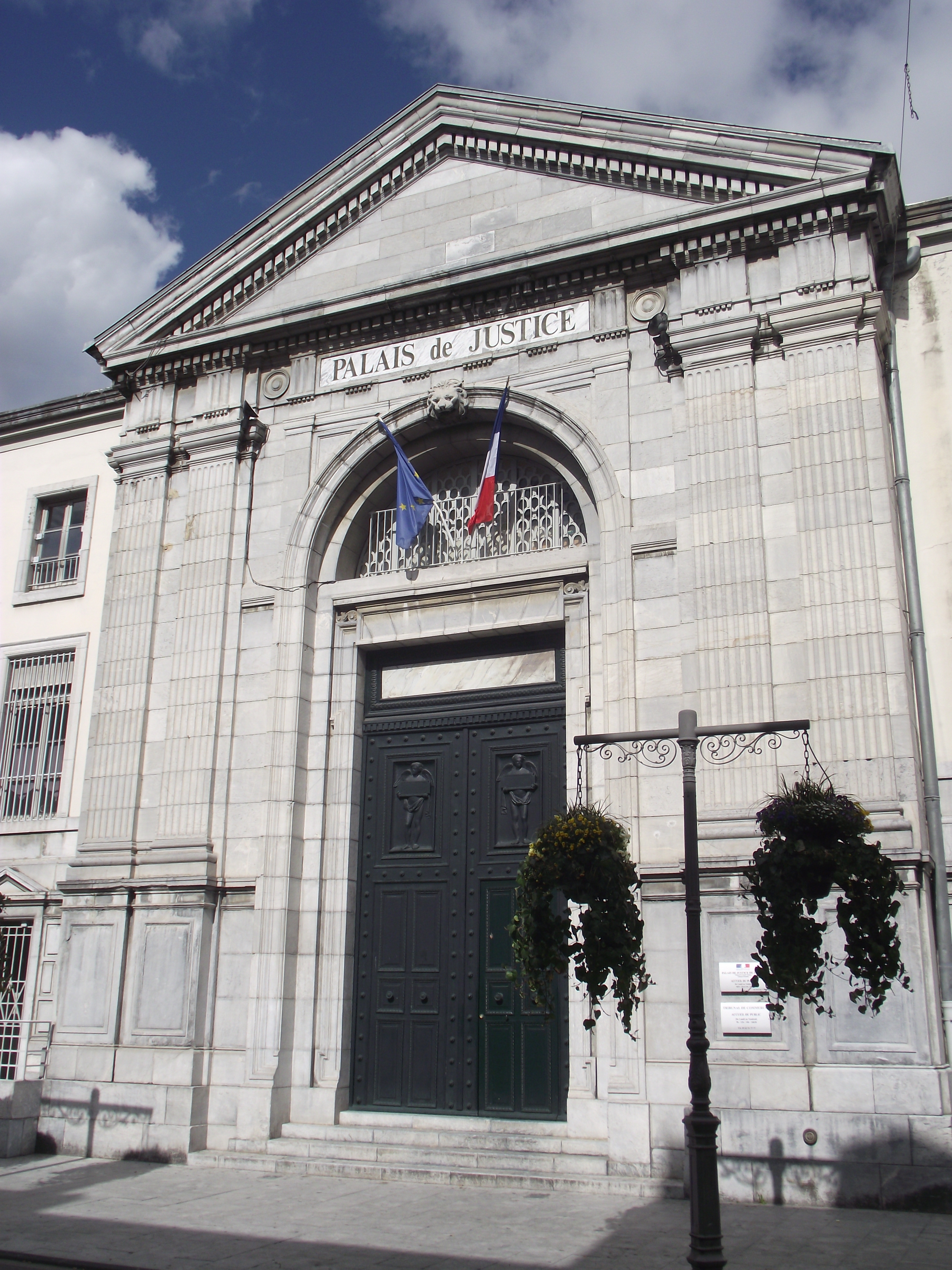
The Tribunal of Grand Instance (High Court) of Tarbes

Tarbes is the capital of the Hautes-Pyrénées department and concentrates various utilities including the court of grand instance, a branch of the Bank of France, the Chamber of Commerce and local industry, the Chamber of skilled crafts, crafts and Services.

In 2011, the municipality of Tarbes was rewarded with the label "Ville Internet @@@@".

=== Political trends and results ===
The municipal history of Tarbes under the Fifth Republic was marked by several waves.

In the elections of 1959, the outgoing Socialist mayor, Marcel Billières, was a victim of the resilience of the Communist Party but especially also the shift to the right, which managed to seize the city hall with the election of Paul Boyrie. He was comfortably re-elected in 1965 (58.4%) and 1971 (55.2%). However, his sudden death a few weeks before the 1977 elections caused confusion in the ranks of the outgoing majority.

In this election, the Communist Paul Chastellain prevailed in the first round (50.6%), at the head of a list of union of the left. He was reelected in 1983 with 54.8% against Jean Journé (UDF-RPR), but took ill with a heart attack during the count. Raymond Erracarret (FCP) was elected mayor by the municipal council. The new councillor regained his chair in 1989 with 54.1% against Jean Journé (UDF-RPR), then with a reduced majority (51.3%) in 1995, against Gérard Trémège (UDF-RPR).

2001 then marked a brand new change: Gérard Trémège, after a merger of the lists of DL-UDF and RPR, became mayor with 50.1% of the vote (26 votes in advance). He was re-elected on 17 March 2008 under the UMP-Radical Party label "Valoisien" this time with 54.3% (1,705 votes ahead of Jean Glavany) and again on 23 March 2014, this time in the first round with 52.95% of the votes.

=== List of mayors ===
List of mayors of Tarbes
Start	End	Name	Party	Other details
March 2001	In progress	Gérard Trémège	UMP	President of the Communauté d'agglomération du Grand Tarbes from 2008 to 2014; Vice-president of the Communauté d'agglomération du Grand Tarbes from 2014; Regional Counsel from 2004
March 1983	March 2001	Raymond Erraçarret	PCF	General Counsel
March 1977	March 1983	Paul Chastellain	PCF	
March 1959	March 1977	Paul Boyrie	RI	
March 1953	March 1959	Marcel Billères	SFIO	

=== Cantons ===
Since the French canton reorganisation which came into effect in March 2015, the city of Tarbes is subdivided into 3 cantons:

Name	Population (2019)	Cantonal Code
Canton of Tarbes-1	13,901	6510
Canton of Tarbes-2	14,145	6511
Canton of Tarbes-3	14,712	6512

=== Intercommunality ===
Since January 2017 Tarbes is part of the Communauté d'agglomération Tarbes-Lourdes-Pyrénées. This was created by the merger of the Communauté d'agglomération du Grand Tarbes with 6 neighbouring Communautés de communes. Grand Tarbes had been created in December 1995 from the former Communauté de communes de l'agglomération tarbaise. The Communauté d'agglomération has competences related to transportation, travellers, culture, sports, environment, the university and the city's policy. It now includes 86 municipalities and has some 123,000 inhabitants (2014 legal population, INSEE).

=== Schools ===
- Public kindergartens

- École Henri-Wallon
- École Michelet
- École Frédéric-Mistral
- École Louise-Michel
- École Berthelot
- École Henri-Duparc
- École Anatole-France
- École Henri-IV
- École Jean-de-La-Fontaine
- École Jeanne-Larroque
- École La Sendère
- École Jacques-Prévert
- École Pablo-Neruda
- École Charles-Perrault
- École Voltaire

- Private kindergartens

- Institution Jeanne-d'Arc
- École Saint-Joseph
- Institution Sainte-Thérèse

- Public primary schools

- École Henri-IV
- École Claude-Debussy
- École Jean-Macé
- École Paul-Bert
- École Jules-Verne
- École Victor-Hugo
- École Jean-Jacques-Rousseau
- École Jean-Moulin
- École La Sendere
- École Ormeau-Figarol
- École Théophile Gautier
- École Voltaire

- Private primary schools

- École Pradeau-La Sède
- Institution Jeanne-d'Arc
- École Saint-Joseph
- Institution Sainte-Thérèse

- Public colleges

- Collège Desaix
- Collège Massey
- Collège Paul-Eluard
- Collège Pyrénées
- Collège Victor-Hugo
- Collège Voltaire

- Private colleges

- Collège Jeanne-d'Arc
- Collège Pradeau-La-Sede

- Public secondary schools

- Lycée Marie Curie
- Lycée Théophile Gautier
- Lycée Adriana
- Lycée Jean-Dupuy
- Lycée Lautréamont
- Lycée Reffye

- Private secondary schools

- Lycée Jeanne d'Arc
- Lycée Pradeau-La-Sede
- Lycée Saint-Vincent-de-Paul
- Lycée Saint-Pierre

=== Higher academic institutions ===
- École nationale d'ingénieurs de Tarbes
- National Polytechnic Institute of Toulouse
- Paul Sabatier University
- University of Pau and Pays de l'Adour
- Institut Universitaire de Formation des Maîtres (part of University of Toulouse II – Le Mirail)
- École supérieure d'art des Pyrénées – Pau Tarbes

=== Health ===
The city has also a medical centre spread over three sites that make up the Intercommunal Hospital Centre of Tarbes – Vic-en-Bigorre (CHIC-TV). On 6 June 2003, the institution changed its name and became the Hospital Centre of Bigorre (CHB): A short stay site ("La Gespe" in Tarbes) and two geriatric sites ("L'Ayguerote" in Tarbes and Vic en Bigorre); in 2016 the new hospital of Tarbes and Lourdes will be in Lanne, opposite the airport. The Ormeau Polyclinic in collaboration with the Pyrenees-Bigorre Clinic is the second centre of health in Tarbes. Every year in October, are organised the Pyrenean Days of Gynecology, of worldwide recognition.

== Demography ==
The population of the commune of Tarbes as of 1 January 2023 is 44,399 inhabitants, thus placing the commune as 12th of the Occitanie region. In 2017, the Communauté d'agglomération de Tarbes-Lourdes-Pyrénées (86 communes, 123,588 inhabitants) was created which, regionally, ranks 8th in population. The urban unit (unité urbaine) has 78,594 inhabitants. It includes the more urbanised communes and those nearest to Tarbes, notably the communes of Aureilhan (8,031 inhabitants), Bordères-sur-l'Échez (5,399 inhabitants), Séméac (5,236 inhabitants), Juillan (3,999 inhabitants) and Barbazan-Debat (3,478 inhabitants). The urban area (aire d'attraction d'une ville) has 135,654 inhabitants (2018), and is the ninth of Occitanie behind Toulouse, Montpellier, Perpignan, Nîmes, Béziers, Narbonne, Montauban and Albi.

Historical population

Year	Pop.	±% p.a.
1793	6,213	—
1800	6,777	+1.25%
1806	7,934	+2.66%
1821	8,035	+0.08%
1831	9,706	+1.91%
1836	12,630	+5.41%
1841	12,425	−0.33%
1846	13,321	+1.40%
1851	14,004	+1.01%
1856	14,743	+1.03%
1861	14,768	+0.03%
1866	14,658	−0.15%

Year	Pop.	±% p.a.
1876	21,293	+3.80%
1881	23,273	+1.79%
1886	25,146	+1.56%
1891	25,087	−0.05%
1896	24,197	−0.72%
1901	26,055	+1.49%
1906	25,869	−0.14%
1911	28,615	+2.04%
1921	26,535	−0.75%
1926	29,856	+2.39%
1931	32,374	+1.63%
1936	34,749	+1.43%

Year	Pop.	±% p.a.
1946	44,854	+2.59%
1954	40,242	−1.35%
1962	46,600	+1.85%
1968	55,375	+2.92%
1975	54,897	−0.12%
1982	51,422	−0.93%
1990	47,566	−0.97%
1999	46,275	−0.31%
2007	44,973	−0.36%
2012	41,664	−1.52%
2017	41,518	−0.07%
2023	44,399	+1.12%

From 1962 to 1999: Population without double counting; for the years following: municipal population.
Source: Ldh/EHESS/Cassini until 1999 then INSEE

The following table shows the 15 communes of the urban unit of Tarbes, all of which are also members of the Communauté d'agglomération de Tarbes-Lourdes-Pyrénées.

Commune	Population (2017)
Tarbes	41,518
Aureilhan	7,745
Bordères-sur-l'Échez	5,227
Séméac	4,926
Barbazan-Debat	3,463
Odos	3,242
Soues	3,061
Orleix	2,127
Laloubère	1,883
Horgues	1,198
Bours	829
Momères	759
Salles-Adour	594
Sarrouilles	529
Chis	315

== Outstanding public buildings and places ==
=== Public buildings ===
The city hall and the courthouse, classical buildings of the 19th century, adjoin the Rue Maréchal-Foch. Built in 1907, it is denoted by its candid monumentality. It is surmounted by a bell tower and faces the Place Jean-Jaurès enthroned with a statue of Danton. On the façade, one can read the motto "Concord, liberty, equality, fraternity, labour." The Hôtel Brauhauban, an 18th-century mansion, is one of its annexes.

Not far away, the Police headquarters occupies two mansions built on the north walls filled in the 18th century to give birth to the current Rue Georges-Clemenceau. The Academy of Inspection of Hautes-Pyrénées occupies a former school, built at the end of the 19th century.

In the La Sède quarter, the prefecture was housed in the old Episcopal Palace, rebuilt in the 17th century. Not far away, lies the old college of Tarbes which became the Lycée Impérial in 1853 and was renamed Lycée Théophile Gautier in 1911. The Council General of Hautes-Pyrénées also has several buildings including the former seminary of priests of the 18th century. The departmental archives are housed in a remarkable building from 1936.

Three places are devoted to the markets: The market hall and the Place Marcadieu, Brauhauban market hall and the Place du Foirail. Near the Brauhauban market hall is an Italian theatre, known as the Théâtre des Nouveautés, which was built in 1885.

=== Fountains and squares ===
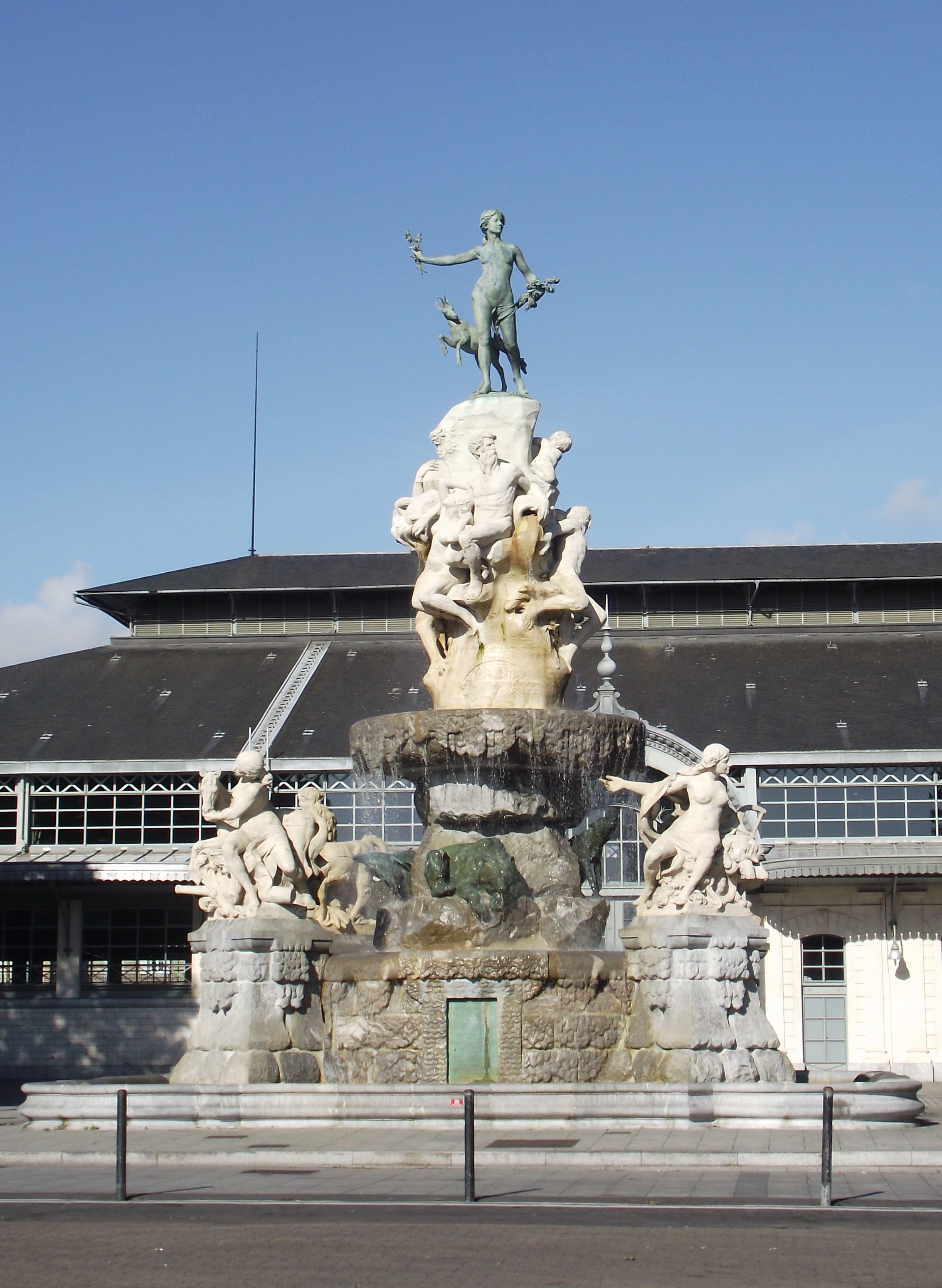
Fountain of the Quatre-Vallées

The city has many fountains. The Place Marcadieu and Place Verdun reproduce the same pattern: They each have two fountains spread at either ends and not in the middle.

Félicité Duvignau initiated this peculiarity, in Place Marcadieu, by bequest wishing for the building of fountains at each end of this vast esplanade. This relates to an eponymous Baltard-type market hall building in 1883. Inaugurated in 1897, the monumental fountain of the Quatre-Vallées, combining cast iron and sculpture, figures the valleys of Bagnères, Aure, Argelès and the plain of Tarbes. At the other end of the square, the more modest "Source de l'amour" [Source of love], presents an echo of the style.

The Montaut fountain is set at the centre of this public space and was moved close to the square of the same name. Named after its donor, it is carved in stone by Nelli of the Pyrenees and was first erected in 1874.

In 2008, the ensemble was further complemented by the construction of a nearby square planted with palm trees, in the north of its namesake Sainte-Thérèse Church.

The Place de Verdun has fountains of a much more contemporary appearance. To the south, the Grande Fontaine [Great Fountain] forms a playful bell of water. It is assisted in the north by the Droits de l'Enfant [Rights of the Child] fountain, where a water jet raises a ball which can be rotated by only the force of the wrist.

The Alhambra fountain, a replica of the mythical Alhambra fountain in Granada, Spain. The fountain is located at 43 Rue Maréchal-Foch in an open-air shopping area. Around the fountain is a landscaping of greenery.

The Fontaine de l'Inondation [Fountain of the Flood] which was installed in the Place de Verdun in 1901 was relocated, in 1934, to the Place de la Courteboule in the Soult quarter. It features a family and its goat fleeing the waters contained therein. This is an allusion to the flood of 1875.

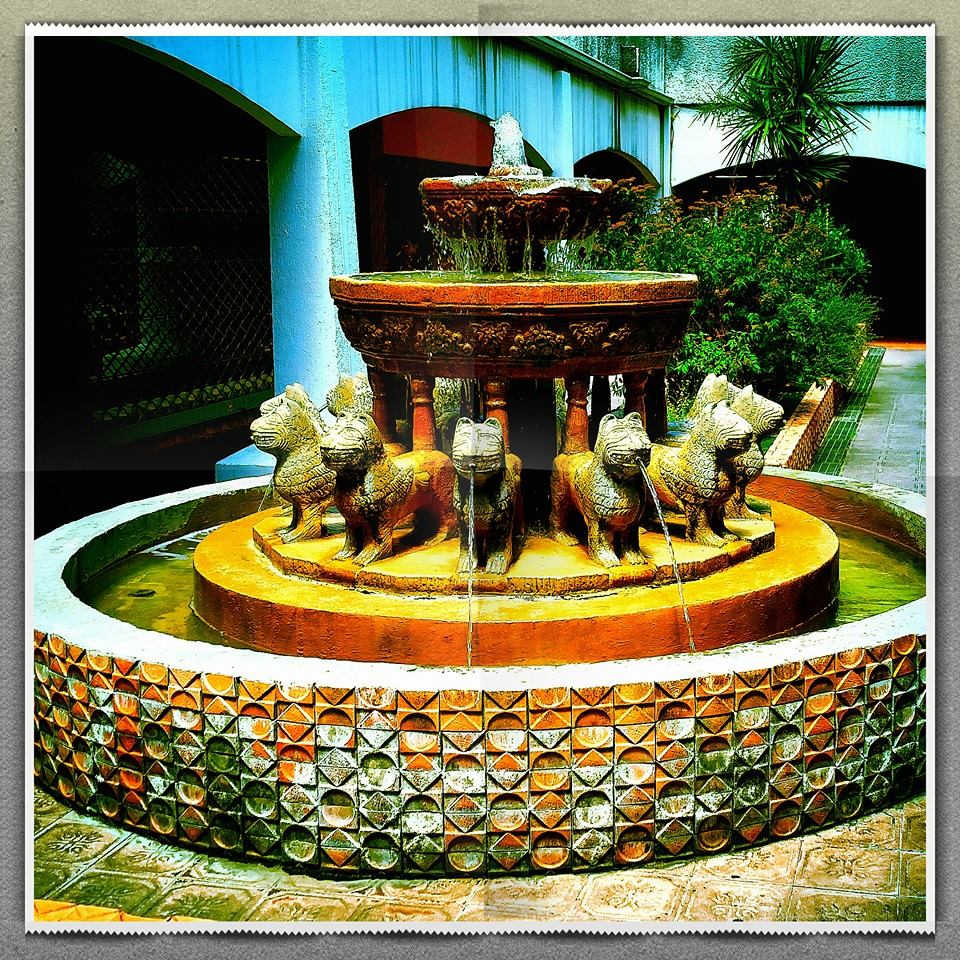
The Alhambra Fountain in Tarbes

Other fountains can also be mentioned such as that of the Cours Reffye, the one in Place Saint-Jean and that of La Gespe in the Place André-Guerlain.

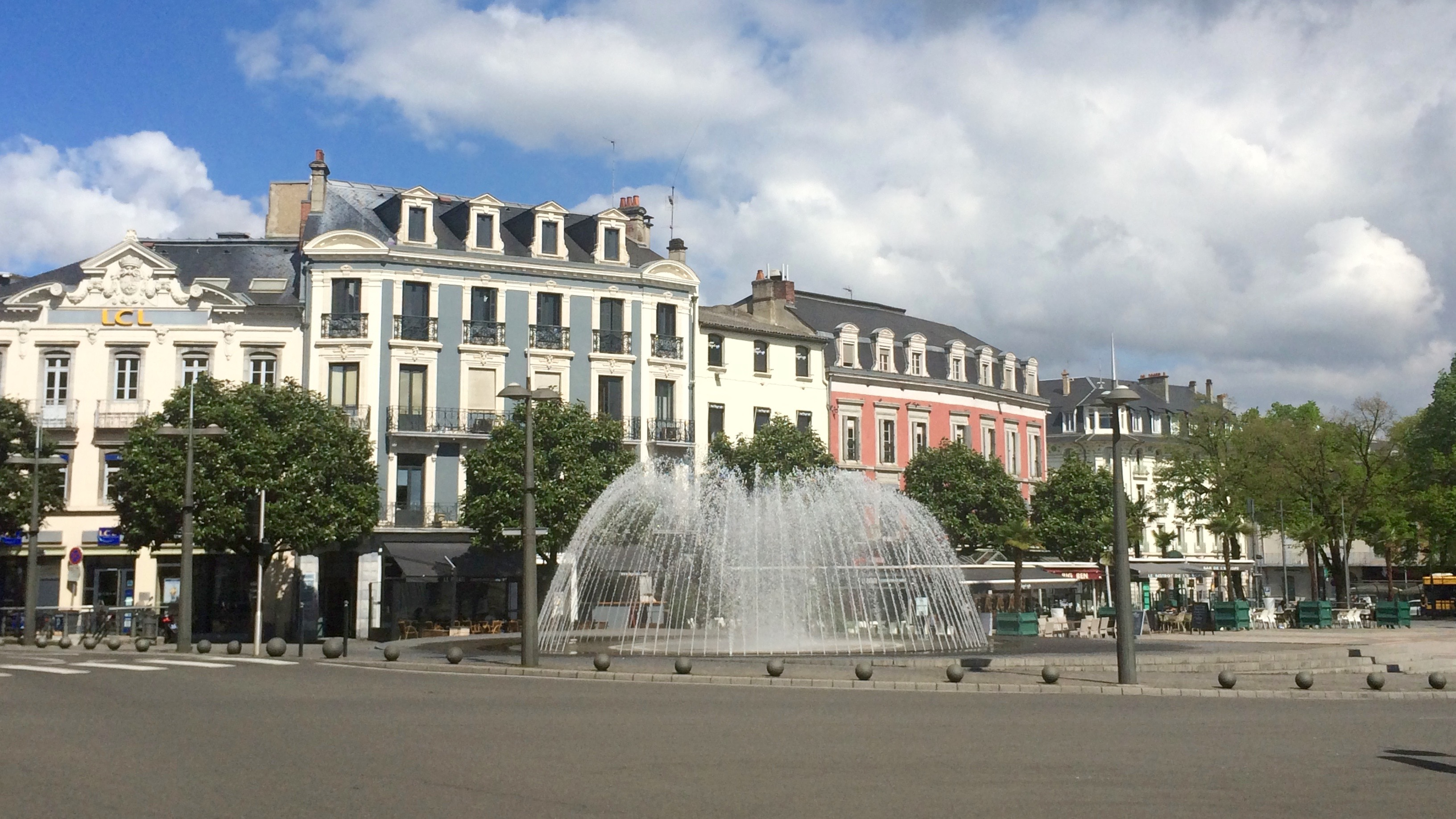
The fountain in the Place de Verdun

=== Military heritage ===
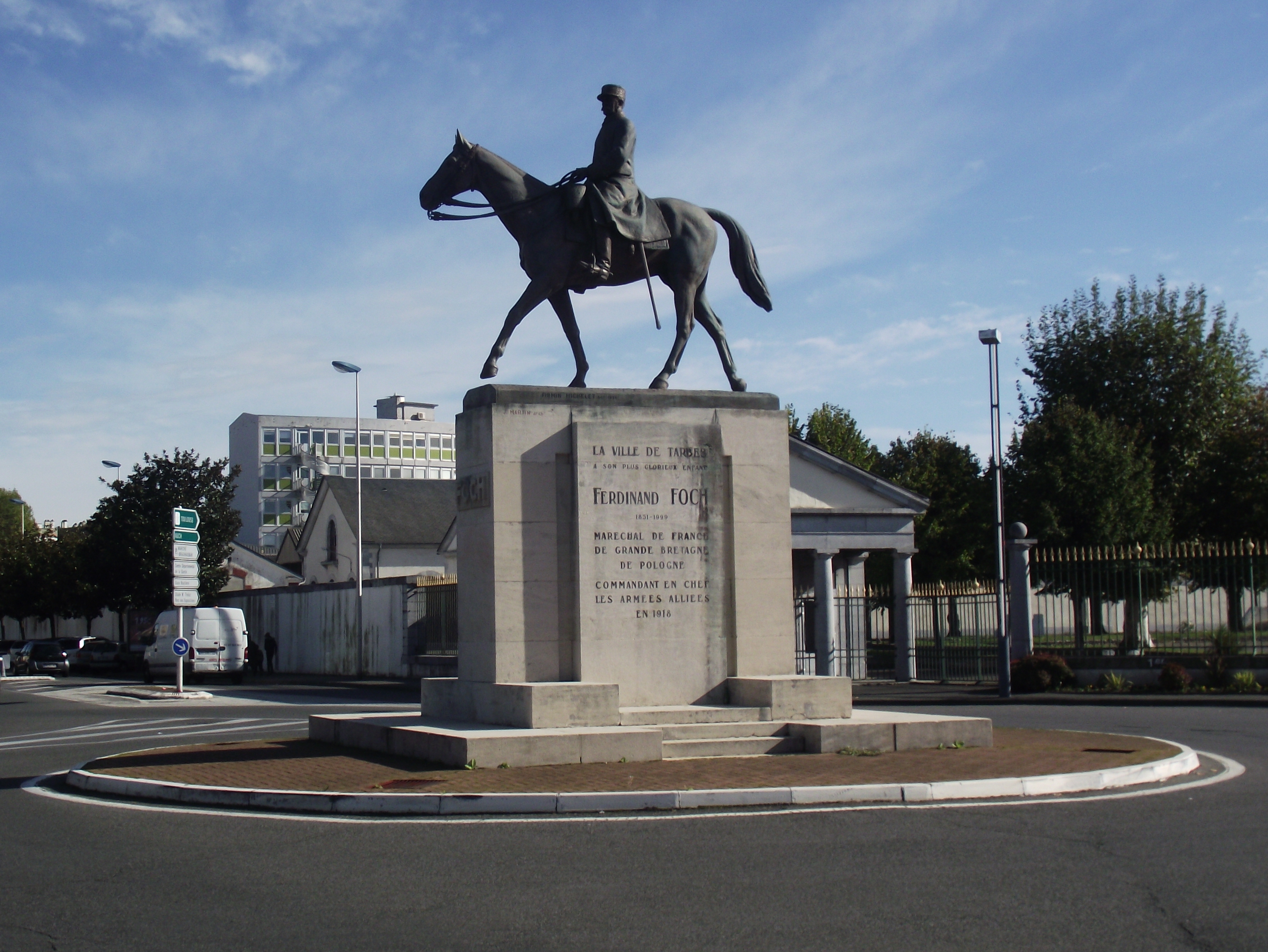
Equestrian statue of Ferdinand Foch

The Haras de Tarbes is composed of an 8 hectares (20 acres) park with Empire-syle buildings including the Maison du Cheval. It was created by Napoleon in 1806 and is the birthplace of a refined breed of horses, the Anglo-Arabian, which are provided to the regiments of hussars. The buildings were built with mostly local materials: Grey marmorifere stone, pebbles of the Adour, bricks and slates. It has a riding school and stables including boxes and with a set of remarkable chestnut panelled ceilings.

During the Franco-Prussian War of 1870, Jean-Baptiste Verchère de Reffye establishes, in the old store of tobacco in Tarbes, an artillery workshop commonly referred to as "Arsenal". It was used for military armament production until 2006. The site is today turning towards the tertiary sector. The old tobacco store houses the Municipal Archives and the Massey Museum reserves. In front stands the House of associations and its bell tower.

The development of the Larrey, Soult and Reffye quarters saw the assertion of the military role of Tarbes in the 19th and 20th centuries. Several barracks were built. With regard to the Larrey barracks (1825), the majesty of the central building, 150 metres (492 feet) long and flanked by two side buildings, is reinforced by the existence of an accessible courtyard from a portal framed by two pavilions of neoclassical inspiration. The ensemble is located in the axis of the Leclerc martial walkways which concentrate memorials including the monumental equestrian statue of Marshal Foch erected in 1935. Firmin Michelet is represented riding Marboré, a horse owned by the Fould family.

The Reffye high school is an old military barracks surrendered by the army after World War II.

=== Industrial remains ===
The former site of the Arsenal has been renovated to accommodate shops, places of leisure (cinema, a second bowling facility, laser quest, restaurants, etc.), municipal or community buildings (archives, maison des associations, business, etc.) and companies. The industrial architecture of the place is preserved. Its genesis took place in 1871 with Jean-Baptiste Verchère de Reffye as the main protagonist. Its industrial deterioration occurred following the 2003 announcement of the closure of the GIAT site, heir to the arsenal of 1871.

Former industrial buildings in Tarbes

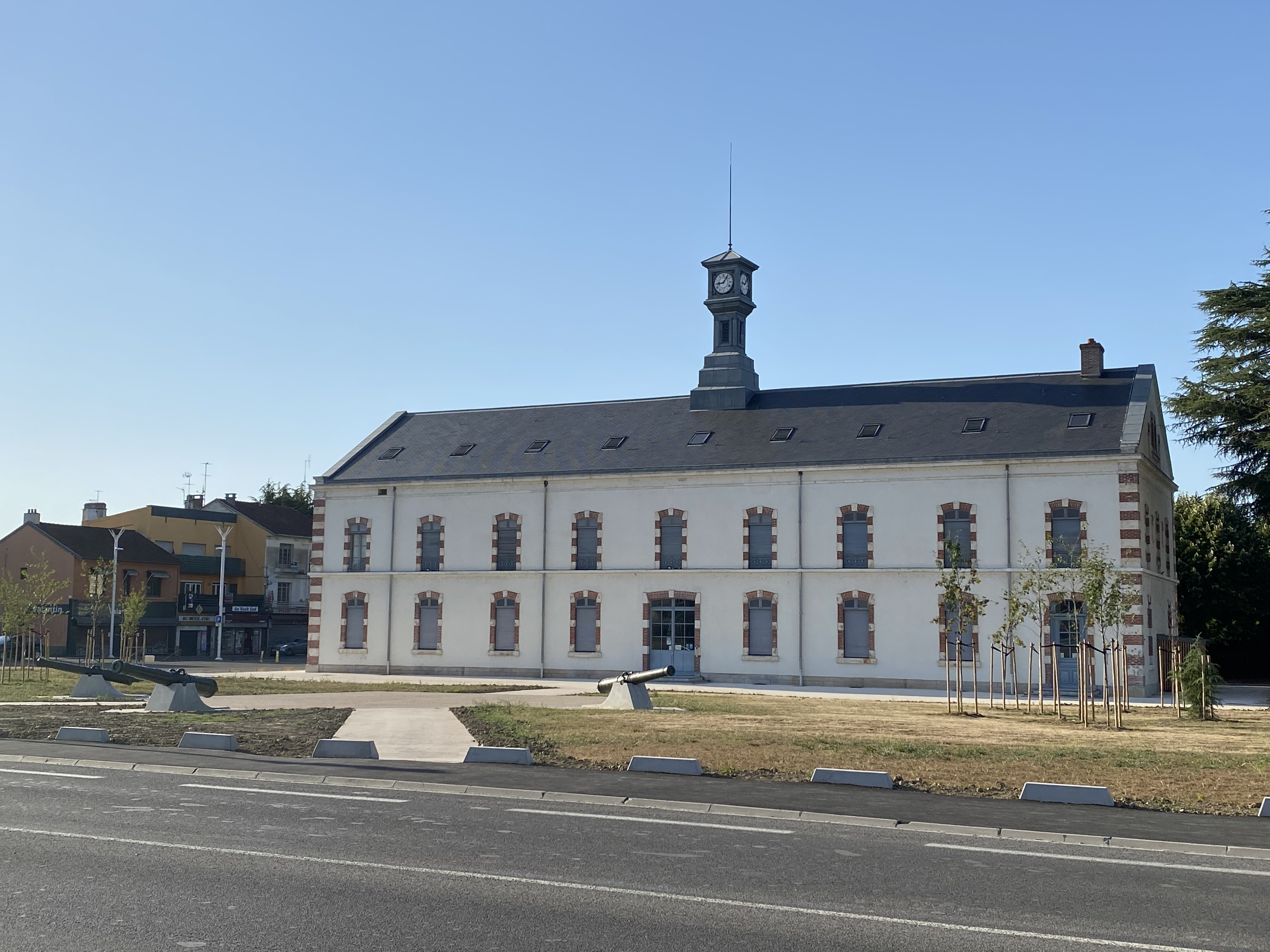
Arsenal building 100 became the Maison des Associations

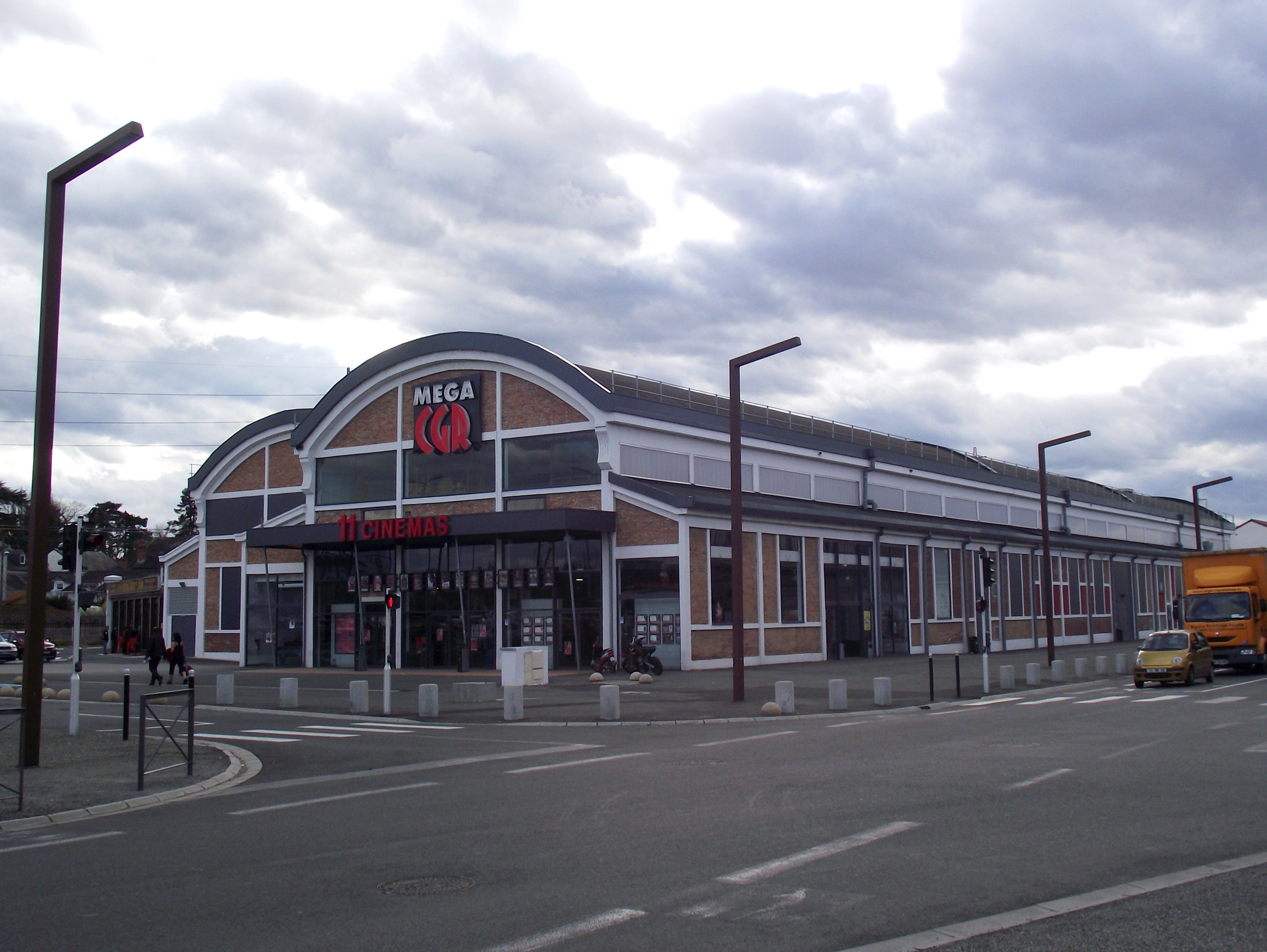
Building 119 became a cinema complex

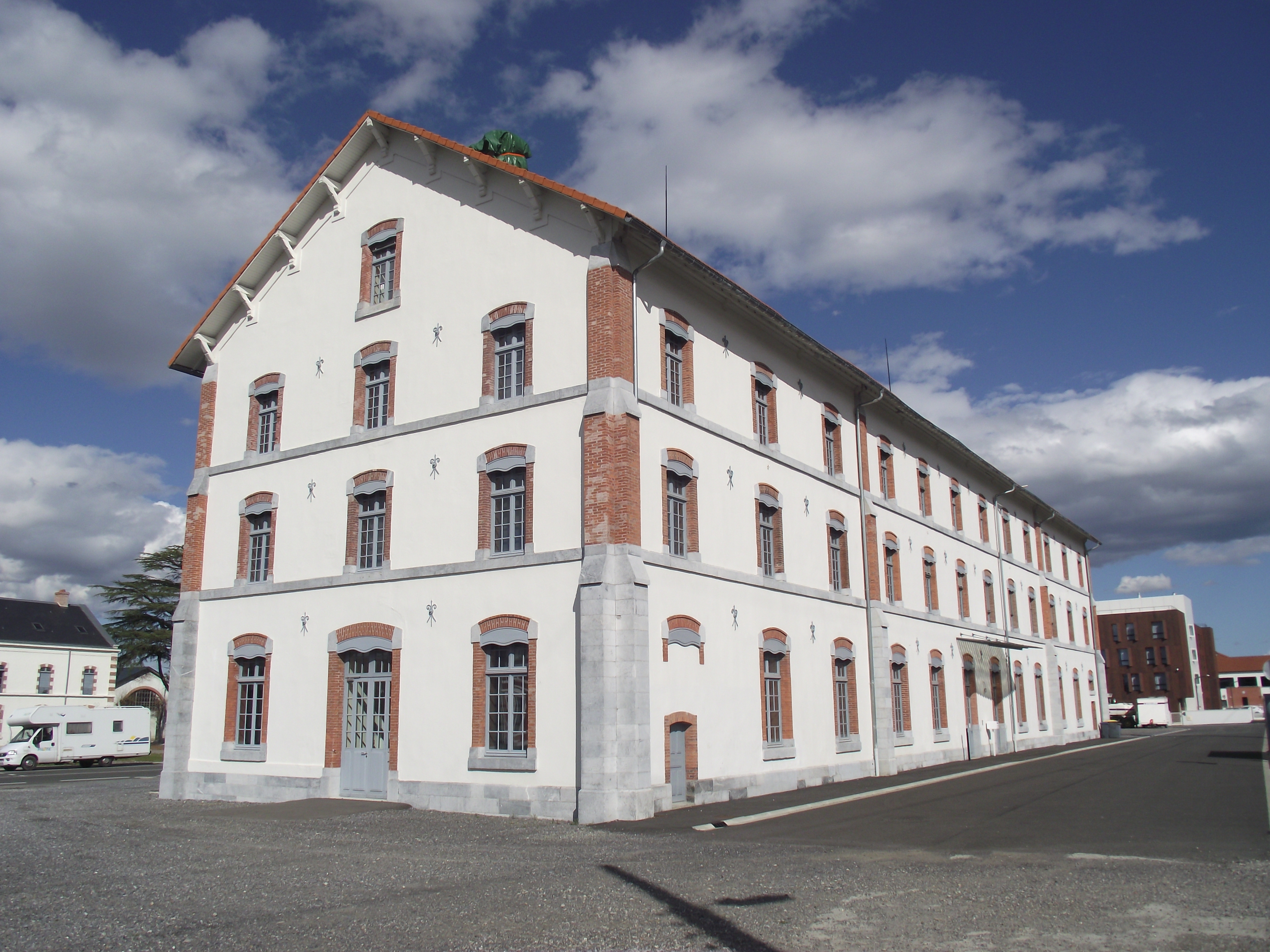
Building 103 became the municipal archives

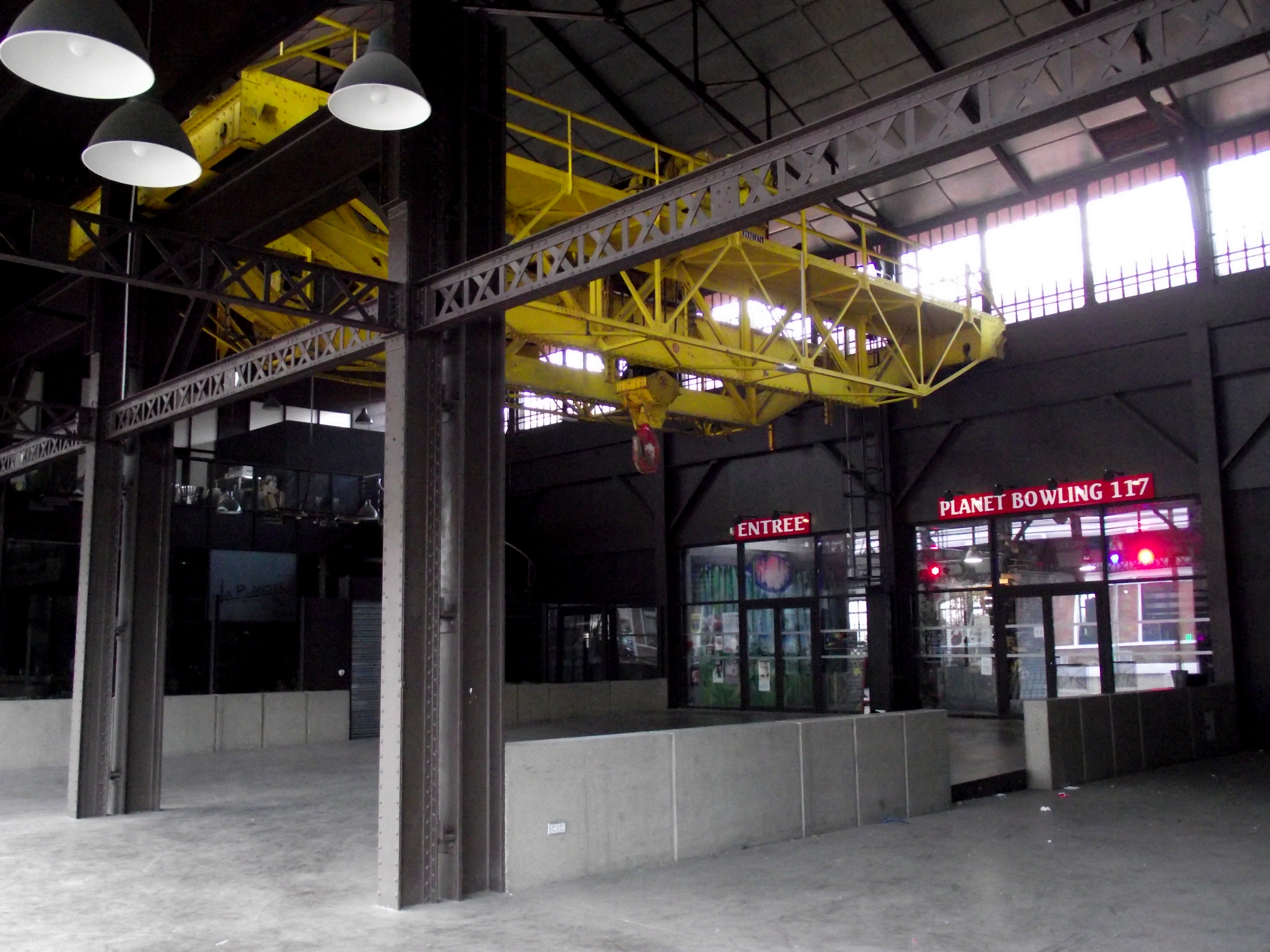
An overhead crane in building 117, which became a leisure complex

This area is adjacent, in Aureilhan, to the Oustau ceramic factory which was founded in 1873 by Laurence Oustau. The factory buildings, abundantly decorated with glazed bricks, were protected as an Historic Monument in 1994.

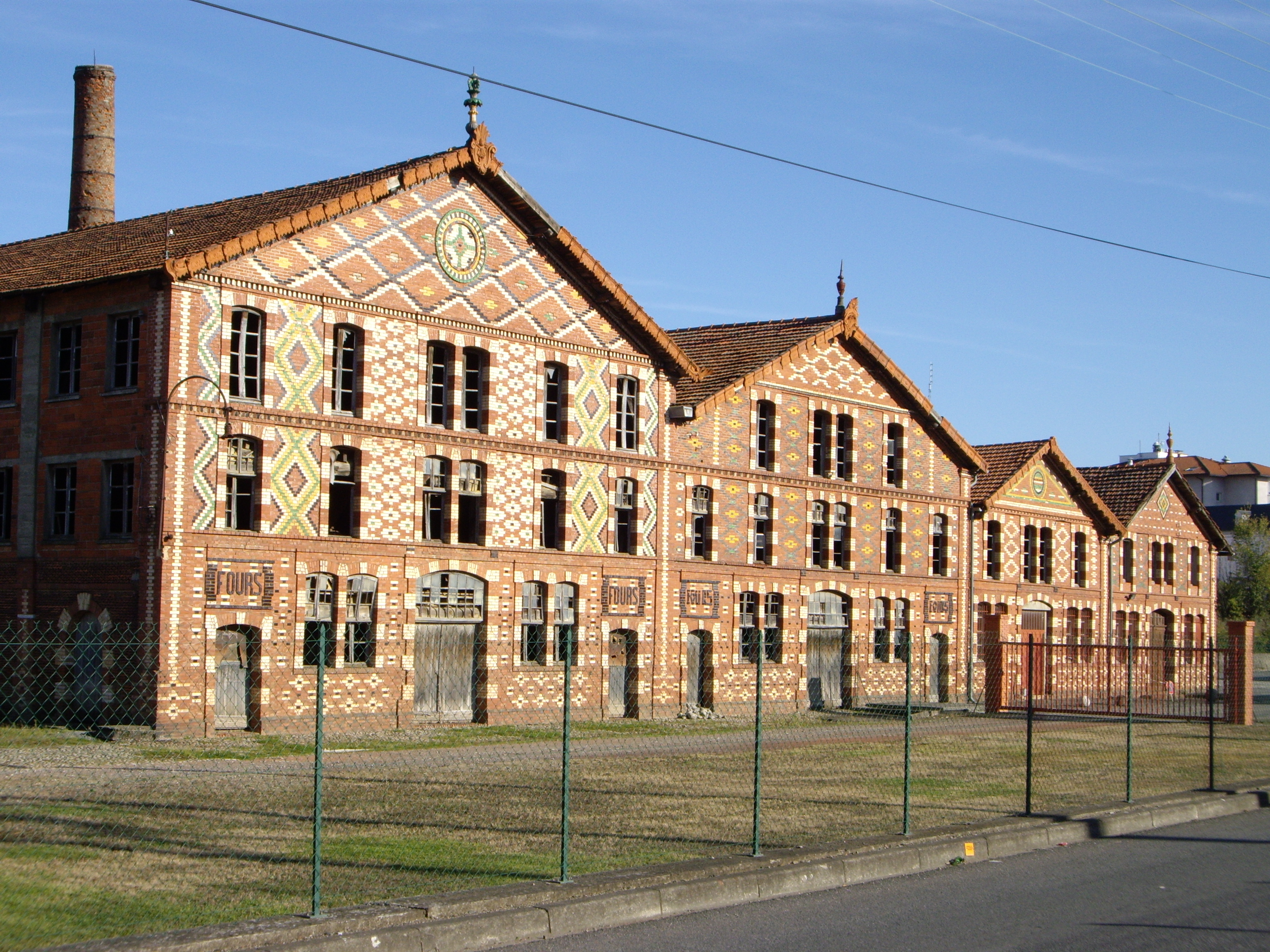
The Oustau ceramic factory in Aureilhan

=== Religious buildings ===
==== Cathedral, churches and mosque ====
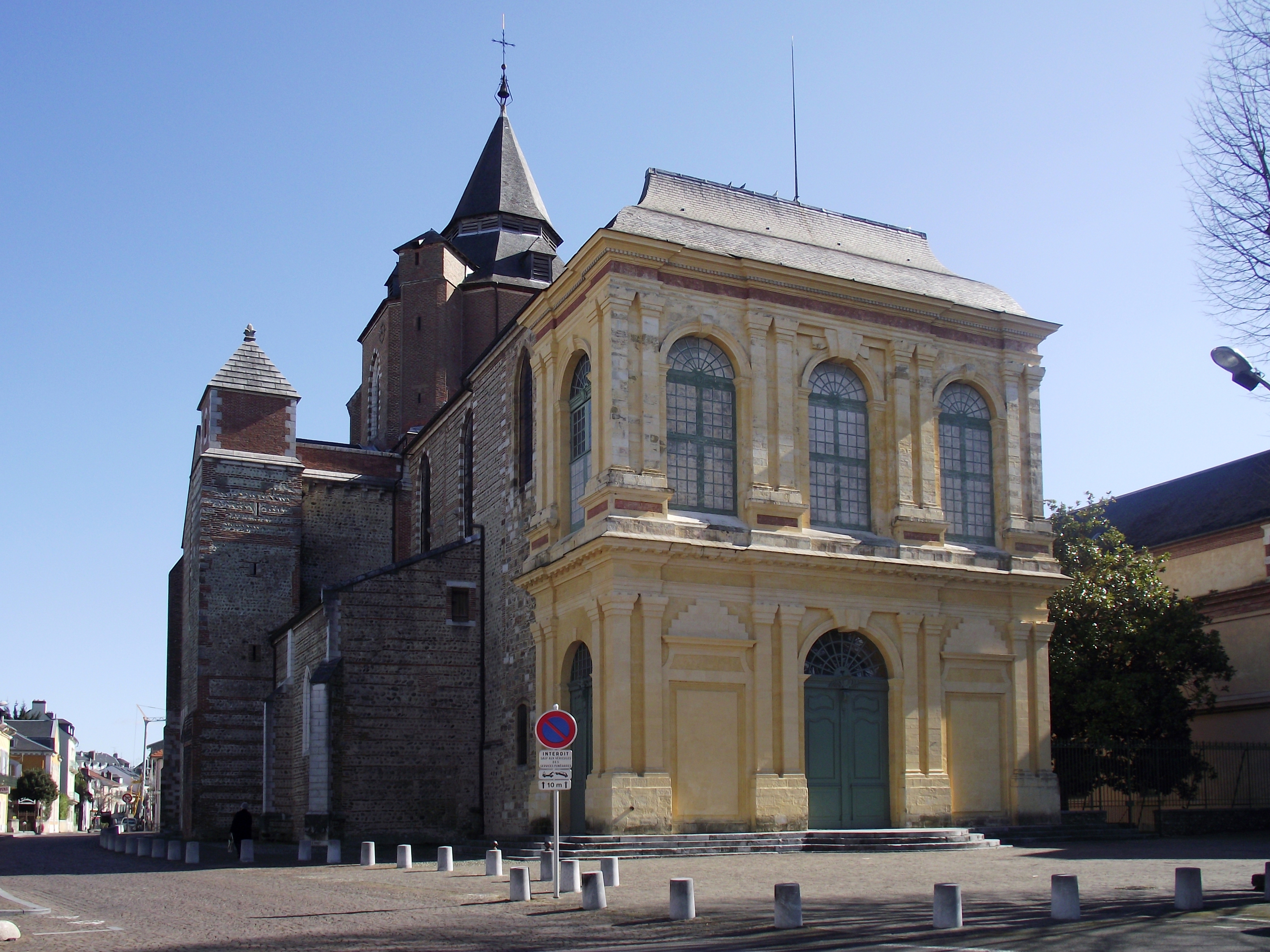
The Cathedral of Notre-Dame-de-la-Sède

Alongside the former Episcopal Palace which became the prefecture, the Notre-Dame-de-la-Sede Cathedral has a classical façade dating from the 17th century. In contrast, the apse chapel is topped by a lantern tower which was enlarged in the Gothic period and the transept dating from the 12th century are primarily marked by the Romanesque origins of the building. The high altar has a Baroque marble canopy, the implementation of which has been attributed to Dominique Ferrère. One can still see the ceiling painted by Henri Borde and the Testament of Louis XVI carved in the oratory. Saint Vincent de Paul was ordained deacon, here, in 1598.

A little further from the city centre, in the direction of Pau or Ibos, is located the Sainte-Anne Church.

The Saint-Jean-Baptiste Church, commonly known as St. John's Church, is located in the heart of the commercial centre, straddling the pedestrianised Rue Brauhauban, and the Rue Maréchal-Foch. Repeatedly devastated during the Wars of Religion, its structure, dating from the 15th century, remains marked by the Gothique méridional trend. In the Middle Ages, the building played a major role in the city and the States of Bigorre met there. The church houses a remarkable organ and many Baroque chapels. The high altar is a work of Jean Brunello. The Neo-Romanesque bell tower dates from the 17th century.

Of Languedoc Gothic style, the Sainte-Thérèse Church is opposite the market halls and the Place Marcadieu. Its history began with the establishment of the Carmelites in the 13th century. The bell tower, which is one of the oldest items, dates from the 15th century and is a remnant of the ancient abbey. The church was, however, largely renovated in the 19th century by the architect of the city, Claude Tiffon. It houses an organ, Baroque statues and several paintings of Raymond-Marc Lagarrigue.

The Church of Saint-Antoine was constructed, near the site of the Arsenal, in 1896. It is thus to link to the past workers of this parish who were Conventual Franciscans.

The Church of Saint-Martin, the Sainte-Bernadette Church and the Saint-Vincent-de-Paul Church, which is pyramid-shaped, are of contemporary architecture.

Founded in 1986, the Serbian Orthodox Church of Notre-Dame Source de Vie [Our Lady Source of Life] is decorated with murals.

In 2005, the first stone of the Omar Ibn al-Khattab Mosque was laid.

Churches of Tarbes

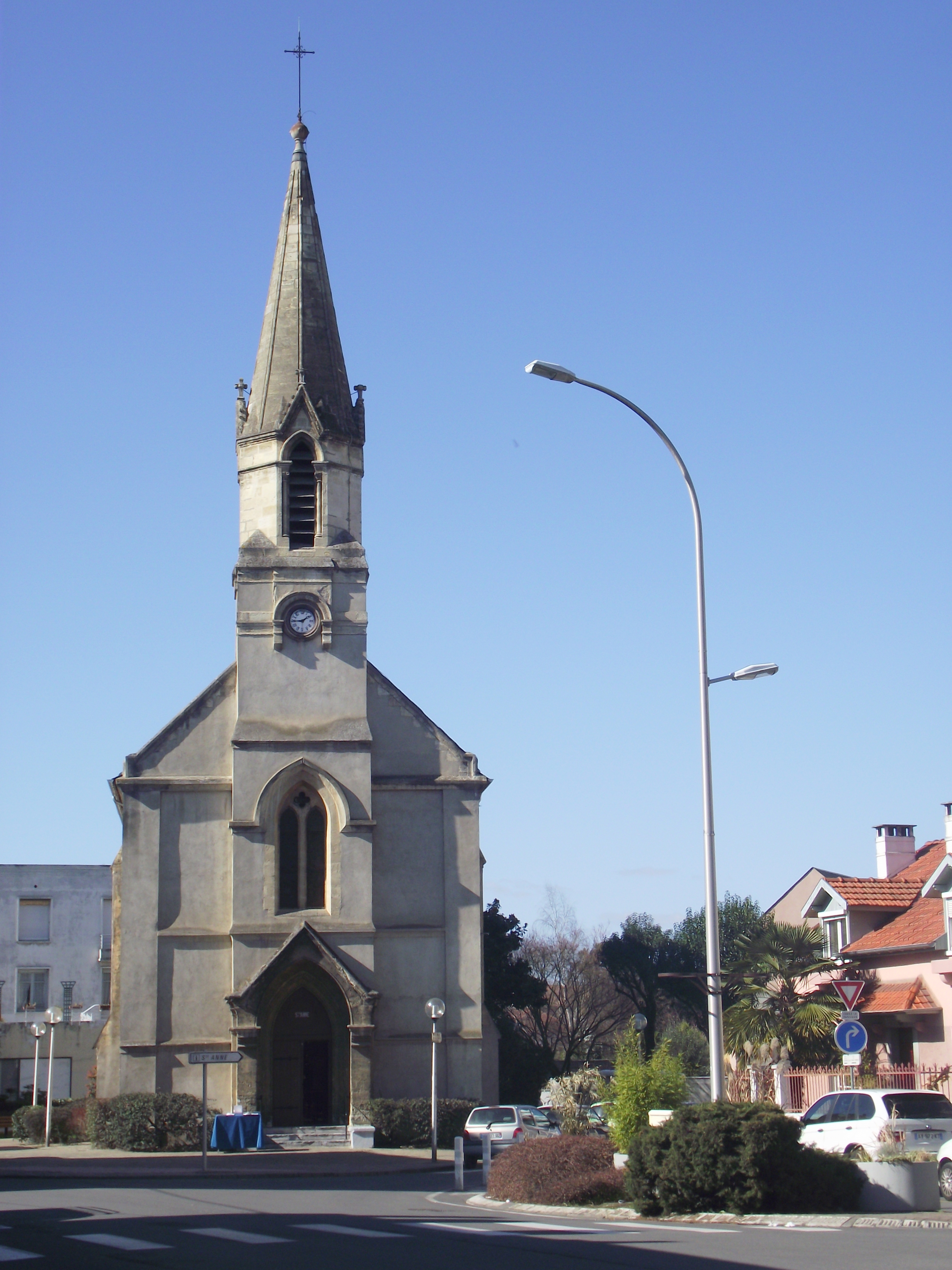
The Church of Saint-Anne

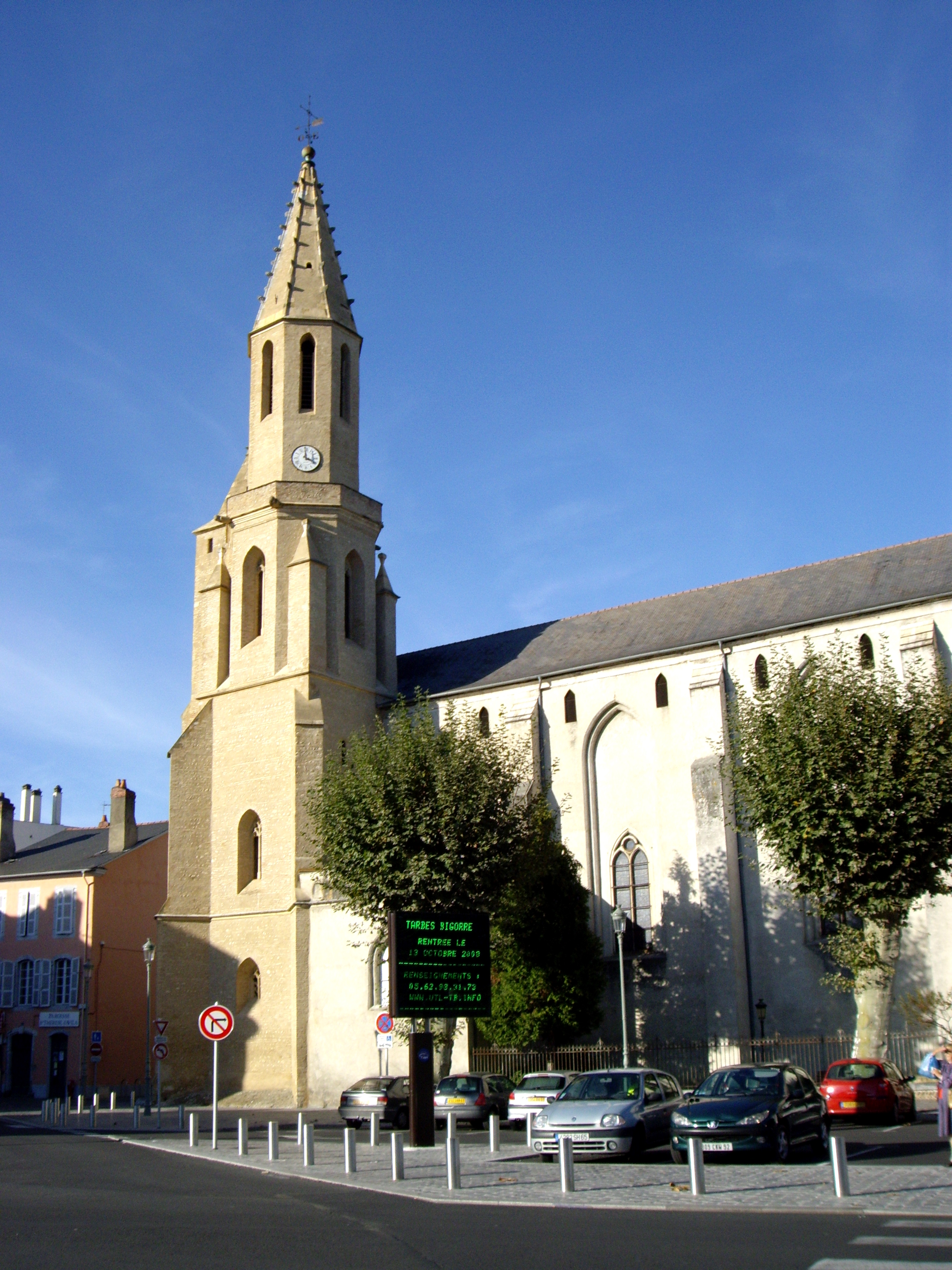
The Church of Sainte-Thérèse

==== Chapels ====
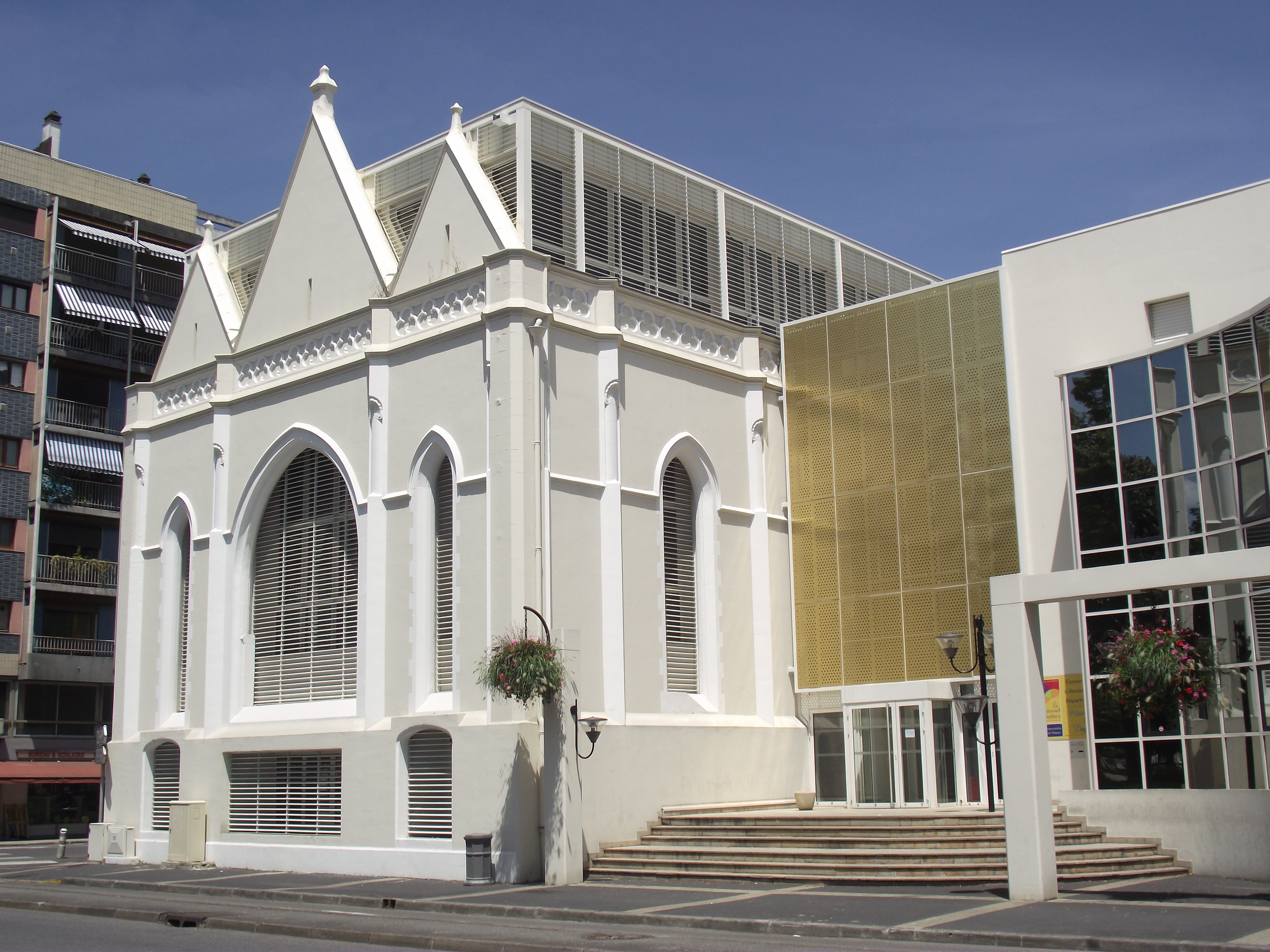
The Henri Duparc Conservatory

The current Théophile Gautier high school, once led by the Doctrinaires (brothers of Christian Doctrine), houses a chapel which has an altar which is classified as an historical monument. It was directed by the Bigorre sculptor Dominique Ferrère during the Baroque period.

The Jeanne d'Arc institution includes a chapel with decor of Art Deco inspiration.

The Ayguerote hospital, which became retirement home, includes a Baroque chapel.

The Carmelite chapel was founded in 1870. Now owned by the town of Tarbes, the chapel became a place of exhibitions. The cloister is not accessible to the public.

The Henri Duparc Conservatory has gradually invested in its adjoining chapel.

=== Old mansions ===
The Hôtel de Bricquet (17th century).

In the La Sède quarter the prefecture and the cathedral are visible, the family home of Marshal Foch dating from the 17th century was converted into a museum. It is typically of Bigorre and remains recognisable by its yellow façade. It is possible to visit the room where he was born, and the office of the Marshal, and to observe objects which are related to him.

Other fine examples of Bigorre houses are visible on the Rue de la Victoire, Rue Clémenceau and also Rue Regiment-de-Bigorre. They are recognisable by their carved wooden doors, their coloured plaster frames which enhance grey marmorifere stone, with their wooden roofed balconies and their slate roofs pierced by skylights.

Opposite the Saint-Jean Church, the birthplace of Bertrand Barère is visible.

At the mercy of the movements of his father, Théophile Gautier was also born in Rue Brauhauban. The house is still visible today. The family, however, lived there for only three years. The Rue Brauhauban is also home to the birthplace of another poet of the 19th century, Laurent Tailhade.

English Imperial style or even Neobasque villas dating from the 19th and 20th centuries, adorn the Massey Garden, the Bel Air Park, the Paul Chastellain Park and their respective quarters. The Villa Massey, in the heart of its namesake garden, is Neo-Moorish (19th century). Villa Fould, formerly the residence of Baron Achille Fould, Minister of State of Napoleon III, has been restored. It now houses the headquarters of the Pyrénées National Park. A little further away is Villa Bel Air from the beginning of the 20th century.

Art Nouveau buildings line the Rue Maréchal-Foch and Rue Bertrand Barrère.

=== Green spaces ===
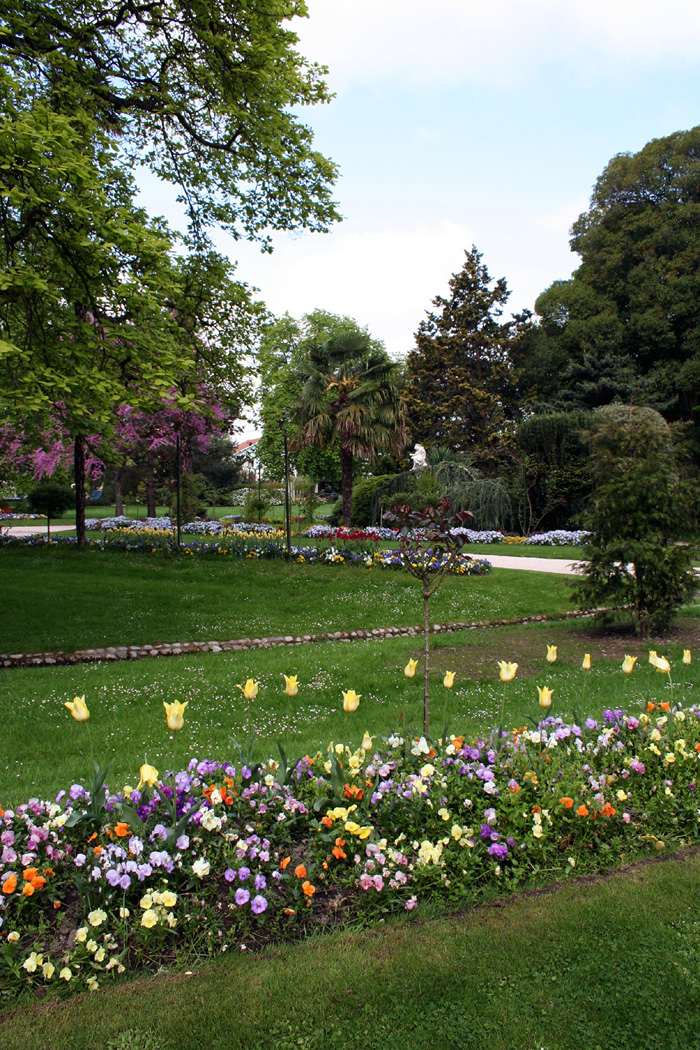
The Massey Garden

Tarbes obtained its fourth flower in 2002 under the Competition of floral cities and villages and seeks to maintain this distinction. Tarbes has also received the Grand Prix national of flowering.

The Massey Garden houses a museum, the cloister of the Abbey of Saint-Sever-de-Rustan, the Higher School of Art of Tarbes, an orangerie, a wildlife park, a bandstand. Depending on the season, it is possible to visit by horse-drawn carriage and small train. It is thus a privileged relaxation area near to the Carmel exhibition hall, the Louis Aragon media library and the Berrens Park tennis courts.

At the centre of the Bel Air Park, sits the old Château Delong better known today as the Villa Bel Air which has become a children's recreation centre. The Sellerie Park, with a more urban aspect, is backed by a separate road.

The Chastellain Park is the haven of greenery of the Villa Fould which contains the administrative headquarters of the Pyrenees National Park.

The Échez Park, a recent green space, is attempting to unite the university quarters of Bastillac and Solazur.

Within the Laubadère quarter, Bois Blancs [White Woods] Park is, similarly, a contemporary creation. It includes five islets symbolizing the five continents plus a central island used to host events. Spaces dedicated to games and sport adorn the area devoted to Europe.

Along the leafy Leclerc paths are gathered various monuments commemorating the two world wars, and which has the equestrian statue of Marshal Foch.

The path of the banks of the Adour, also called Camin Adour, is equipped with a fitness trail and is a landscaped walking space.

== Culture ==
=== Museums and exhibition spaces ===
The Massey Museum is best known for hosting the International Museum of the Hussars. However, it also presents a rich collection of fine arts. The building, located within the Massey Garden, is of Moorish style.

The exhibition room of Carmel is housed in a former Carmelite convent dating from 1870.

Museums of Tarbes

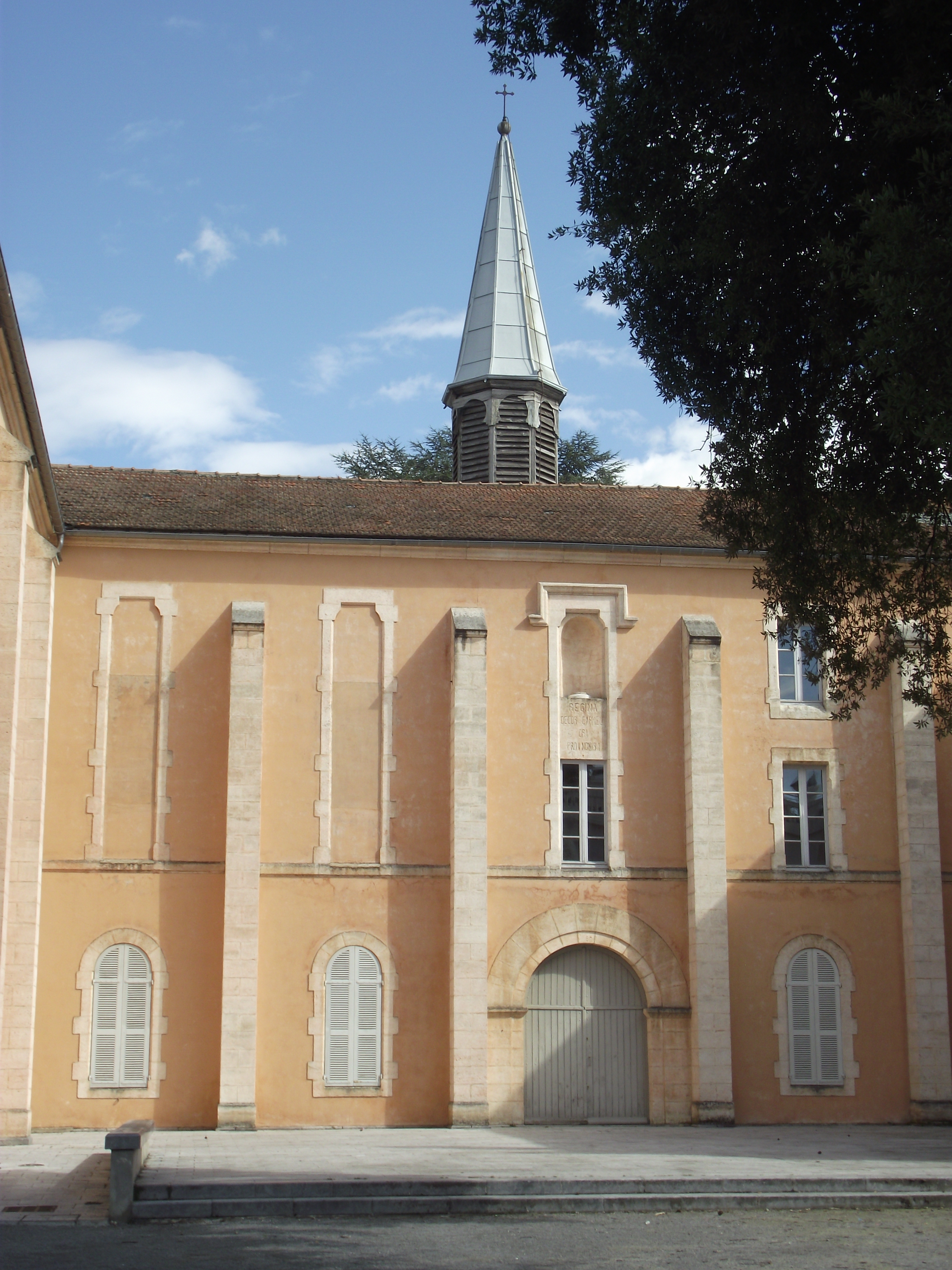
Carmel de Tarbes

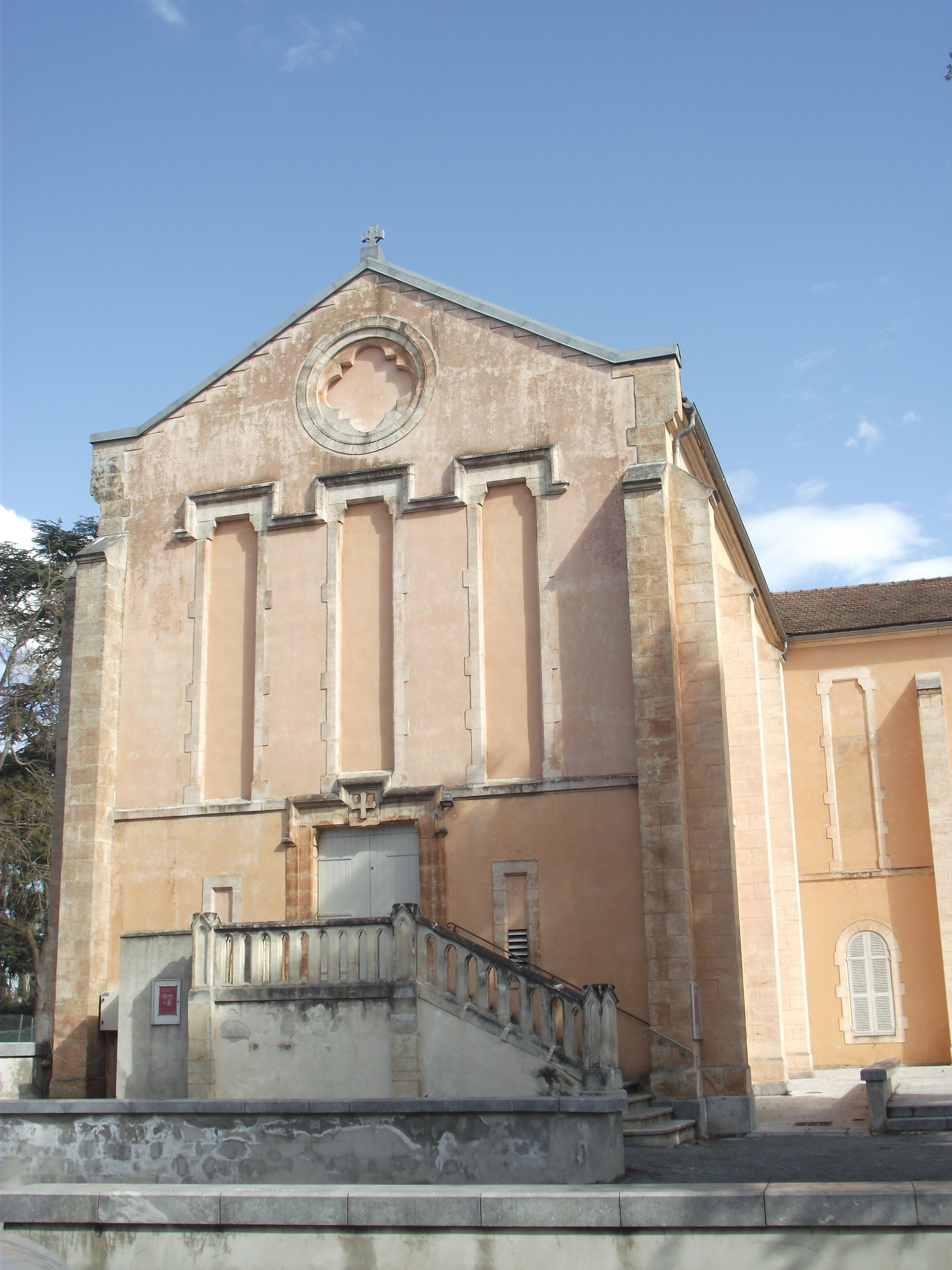
Carmel de Tarbes

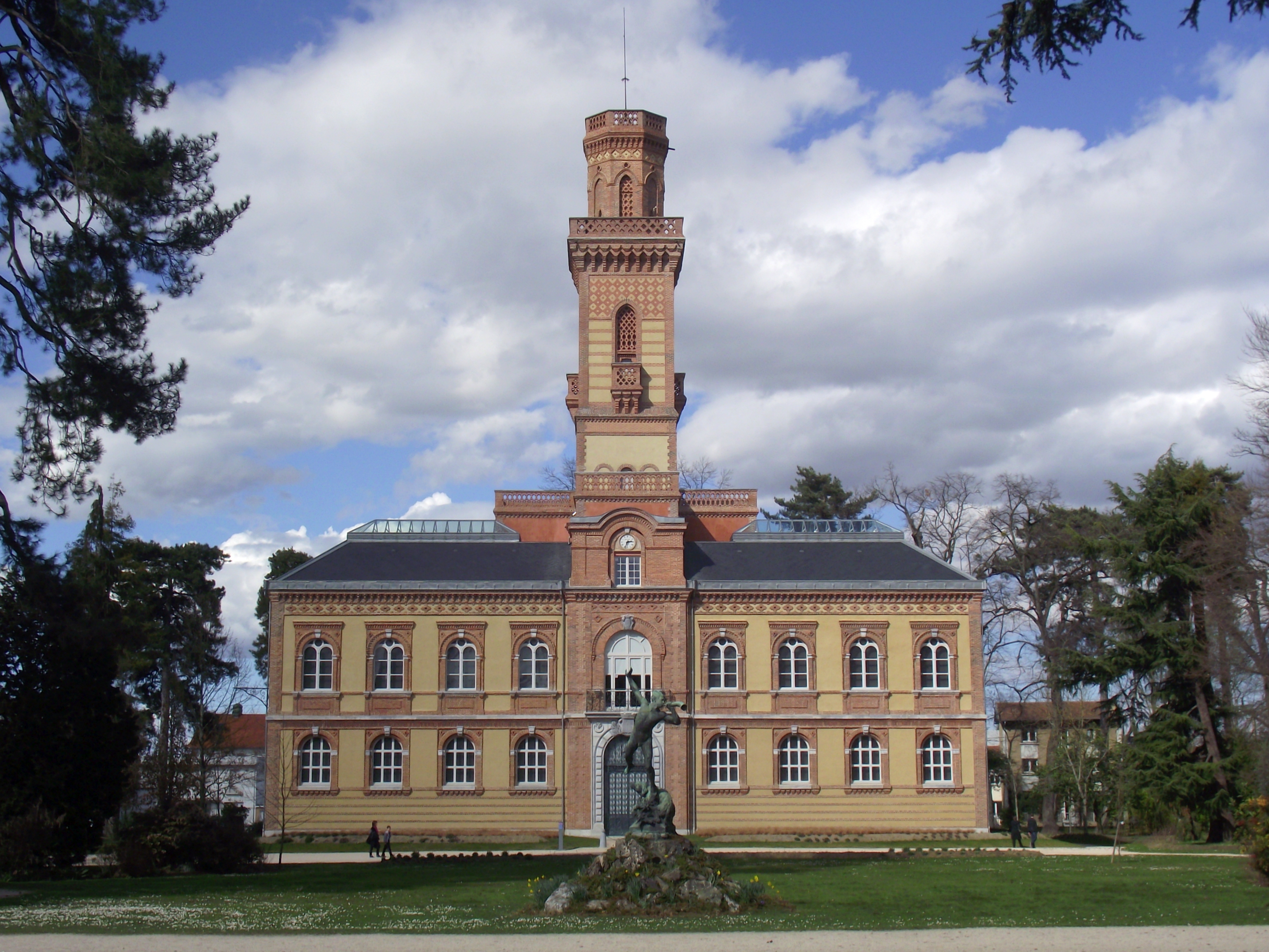
Massey Museum

The Museum of Deportation and Resistance, inaugurated in 1989, was the brainchild of the associations of former deportees and former resistance fighters.

The museum space of the House of the Pyrénées National Park evokes the local flora and fauna.

The French national stud displays old saddles, carriages, a farrier's workshop, etc.

In the birthplace of Marshal Foch, his room has been reconstituted, along with its alcove and his office. It preserves the memories of his personal and military objects, etc.

=== Musical culture ===
The city of Tarbes is to the delight of audiophiles, with the last independent record store of the south-west, which moved premises from Pau. Located in the city centre, at 43 Rue Maréchal-Foch, it is reserved for vinyl collectors with numerous musical genres. This place attracts French and foreign travellers as they pass through the Bigorre city.

=== Theatres ===
In addition to the exhibition halls, the various stages and theatres of the city, including that of La Gespe devoted to contemporary music. La Pari, the performing arts stage, is still a place for contemporary creativity. The main theatre remains that of the Nouveautés but Le Parvis, a multidisciplinary cultural institution combining music, dance and cinema on the outskirts in the heart of the Le Meridien commercial centre, sees many pieces played within.

A cinema with eleven rooms "all-digital and 3D" opened its doors in 2010 in a former GIAT industrial building, renovated for the occasion.

=== Events ===
Throughout the year, Tarbes offers all kinds of activities, here is a comprehensive list:

January

- Petits As tennis world tournament
- Puppy show
- Show of the artists of the Saint-Antoine quarter

February

- Funfair
- The Railwaymen Painters' Show
- Women's tournament of Basque pelota
- The Stamp Festival

March

- International Women's Day
- Days of the French language
- Agricultural fair
- The nautical Tarbes
- Day of courtesy on the road
- Martial Arts Gala
- Bullfight of Tarbes

April

- Day of Summer Jobs
- Sustainable Development Week
- Week of flavours
- The night of the Rocktambules
- Occitan week
- Used car show
- Real estate and renewable energy exhibition
- The Comic Book Festival
- National Day of Remembrance

May

- European Solar Days
- Festival Danceroots
- Forum of associations
- May of the Book
- Festival of Neighbors
- Festival of Urban Culture
- Festival of the Game
- Baptism and meetings of Capoeira

June

- "Culture of the Islands" Festival
- Ceremonies of 8–18 June
- National Philately Exhibition
- Festivals de Tarbes
- The Open Doors of the 35th RAP
- Music Festival
- Pyrenees Passions Exhibition
- Antiques exhibition
- Swimming meeting
- National carriage driving competition

July

- Equestria horse riding Festival
- Night market
- July 14 ceremony
- Night of the stars

August

- International festival of Argentine tango
- Equestria horse riding Festival
- Ceremony of the liberation of the city
- The "Vuelta" (Tour des Pyrénées)
- Night market

September

- International military music festival
- Day of the bike
- Celebration of sport in family
- Arts and Decoration fair
- Vital'Sport
- Slalom auto-sport pursuit
- Quinqua's Cup
- Heritage days
- Day of celebration of the Association Avenue de la Marne
- Parachuting Cup
- Agro-Sud Industry Show
- National day of homage to the harkis
- International dog show
- Terro'Art
- Tournament of numbers and letters
- Convention of role-playing games of the lands of the West

October

- Pyrenean days of gynaecology "Infogyn"
- Day of the Dys
- Education fair
- Fair of Tarbes
- Festival of Sainte-Thérèse
- Week of education and the fight against racism and discrimination
- World Breastfeeding Week
- Show "venue for employment"
- The Cîmes martial arts tournament

November

- Ibero-Andalusian Festival of Tarbes and of Bigorre
- Hobbies fair
- Week of the mandolin
- International solidarity week
- Nature and ecosystems show
- Tea party
- Festival of science
- Tarbais sports festival

December

- "Tarbes in December" (Christmas market, ice rink, etc.)
- Gala of ENIT

== Local media ==
=== Newspapers ===
The group of La Dépêche du Midi has a local daily edition as well as a comparable second edition branded as the La Nouvelle République des Pyrénées (the latter does not appear on Sunday unlike the first which is published every day).

The Sogemedia Group publishes the weekly La semaine des Pyrénées.

A version of the weekly Le Petit Journal is also available in the department.

=== Radio ===
FM channels include several local radio stations with their premises in the urban area: Pic FM, Ràdio País, Atomic, etc.

Other radio stations in the region broadcast local information bulletins such as 100% Radio.

Some national radio stations still have studios in the city such as Fun Radio and NRJ.

=== Internet ===
Several web portals of local influence are based in Tarbes, such as Bigorre.org.

There are still several information websites (webzines), sometimes having their own web TV broadcasts such as Tarbesinfo.fr.

== Gastronomy ==
- The Tarbais beans
- Madiran wine
- The black pork of Bigorre
- Gâteau à la broche
- Barèges mutton

== Military life ==
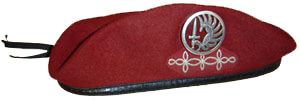
Red beret of the 1st Parachute Hussar Regiment

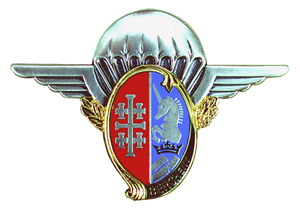
Badge of the 1st Parachute Hussar Regiment

- Military units currently stationed in Tarbes:

- 1st Parachute Hussar Regiment, since 1953.
- 35th Parachute Artillery Regiment, since 1947.

- Military units which have been stationed in Tarbes:

- 53rd Infantry Regiment, 1871–1907
- 14th Field Artillery Regiment, before 1906–1914
- 24th Field Artillery Regiment (France), 1906
- 24th Divisional Artillery Regiment, 1939–1940
- 5th Hussar Regiment, 1838–1839
- 9th Hussar Regiment, 1851–1856
- 1st Parachute Hussar Regiment, 1858
- 2nd Hussar Regiment, 1859–1861
- 10th Hussar Regiment, 1901–1919
- 2nd Hussar Regiment, 1919–1940
- 2nd Hussar Regiment, 1940–1942
- 2nd Hussar Regiment, 1944–1945
- 3rd Company of Mounted Cavalry, before 1906–1914
- 541st Veterinary Group

== Sport ==
=== Clubs ===
- Women's basketball: Tarbes Gespe Bigorre, the main sporting team of the town, which participates in the LFB (champion of France title) elite and European competitions since 1993 (FIBA EuroLeague Women, FIBA EuroCup Women, and winner of the Ronchetti Cup in 1996)
- Rugby union: Tarbes Pyrenees in Pro D2.
- Football: Tarbes Pyrénées Football, playing in the CFA (4th division)
- Fencing: Amicale tarbaise d'escrime, 11-time champions France with the sabre team (last in 2008).
- Canoe-Kayak: Tarbes Auch Midi-Pyrénées

=== Facilities ===
- Palace of sports of the Quai de l'Adour
- Maurice Trélut Stadium

=== Events ===
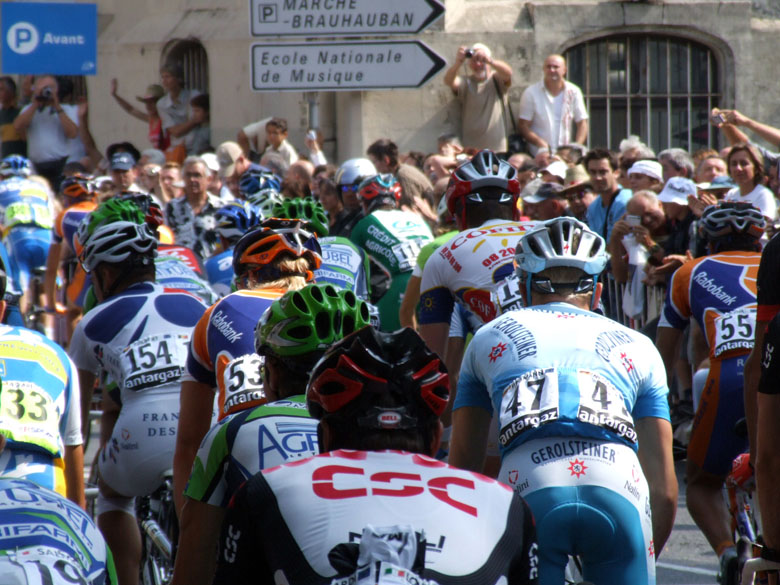
2006 Tour de France stage held in Tarbes with a large turn out

- During the 20th century, Tarbes was on the route of the Tour de France in 1933, 1934, 1951, 1975, 1978, 1987, 1993 and 1995.
- Stage 14 of the 2001 Tour de France departed from Tarbes.
- Stage 11 of the 2006 Tour de France departed from Tarbes.
- Stage 9 of the 2009 Tour de France finished in Tarbes. The stage winner was Pierrick Fédrigo, with Rinaldo Nocentini being the holder of the yellow jersey after the stage finish.
- The 2015 Tour de France had Tarbes as the departure point for Stage 10, heading to the Col de la Pierre St Martin, on 14 July.
- The Tarbes-based Petits As Tournament is a major international tennis competition for 12- to 14-year-old juniors.

== Notable people ==
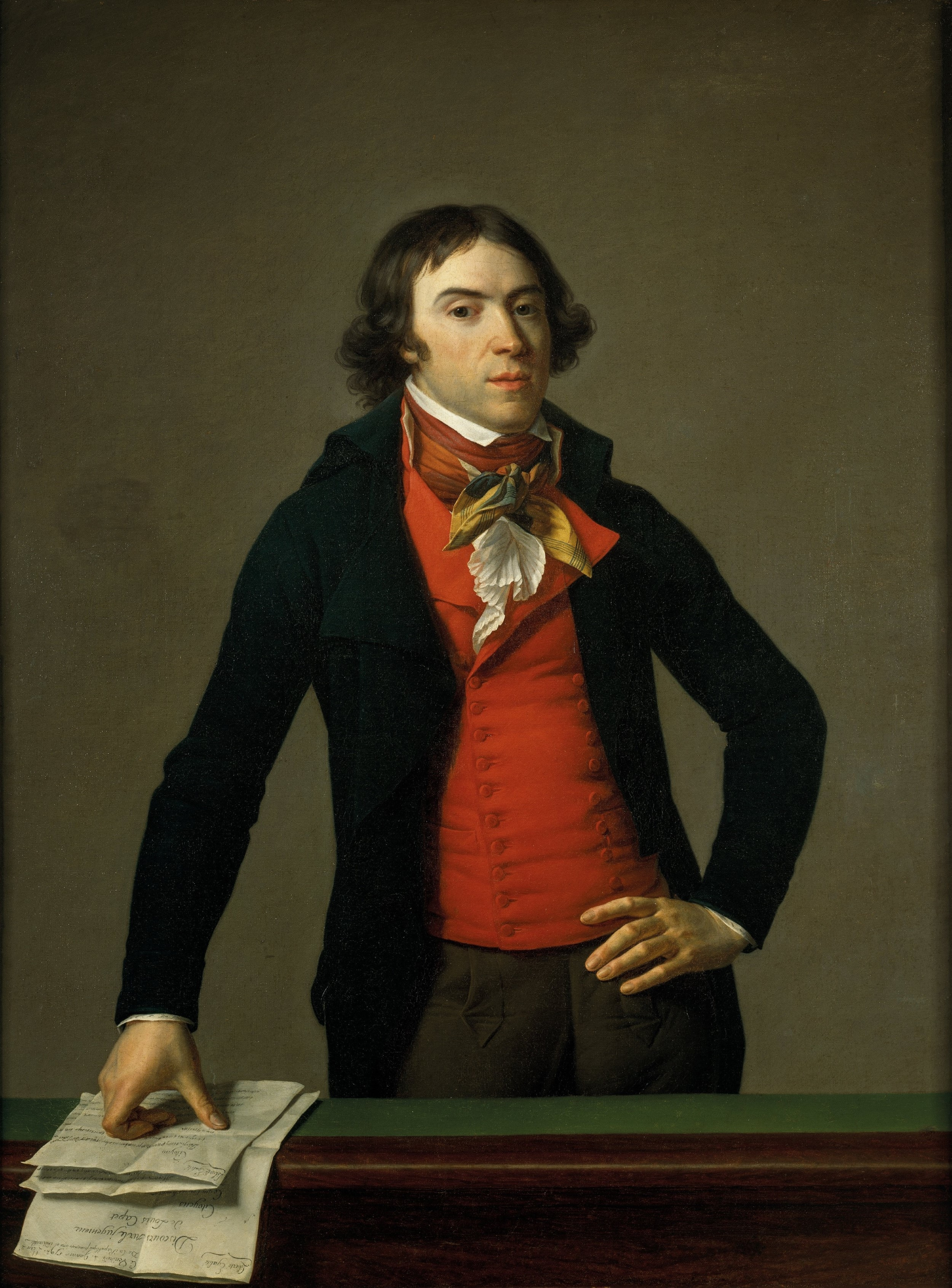
Bertrand Barère

=== Political figures ===
- Bertrand Barère (1755–1841), revolutionary, Deputy of the Third Estate in 1789.
- Antoine de Castelnau (died 1539), Bishop of Tarbes and a French diplomat
- Gabriel Deville (1854–1940), socialist theoretician, politician and diplomat.
- Jean Glavany (born 1949), Minister of Agriculture, 1998/2000 & President of Grand Tarbes, 2001/2008
- François de Mazières (born 1960) politician, Mayor of Versailles since 2008.
- Charles Antoine de La Roche-Aymon (1697-1777), prelate, cardinal and Grand Almoner.
- Eugène Ténot (1839-1890), former prefect and member of the Hautes-Pyrénées.
- Maurice Trélut (1881-1944), Mayor of Tarbes 1935/1944, prisoner of war
- Gérard Trémège (born 1944), Mayor of Tarbes since 2001, member of the Radical Party

=== Sportspeople ===
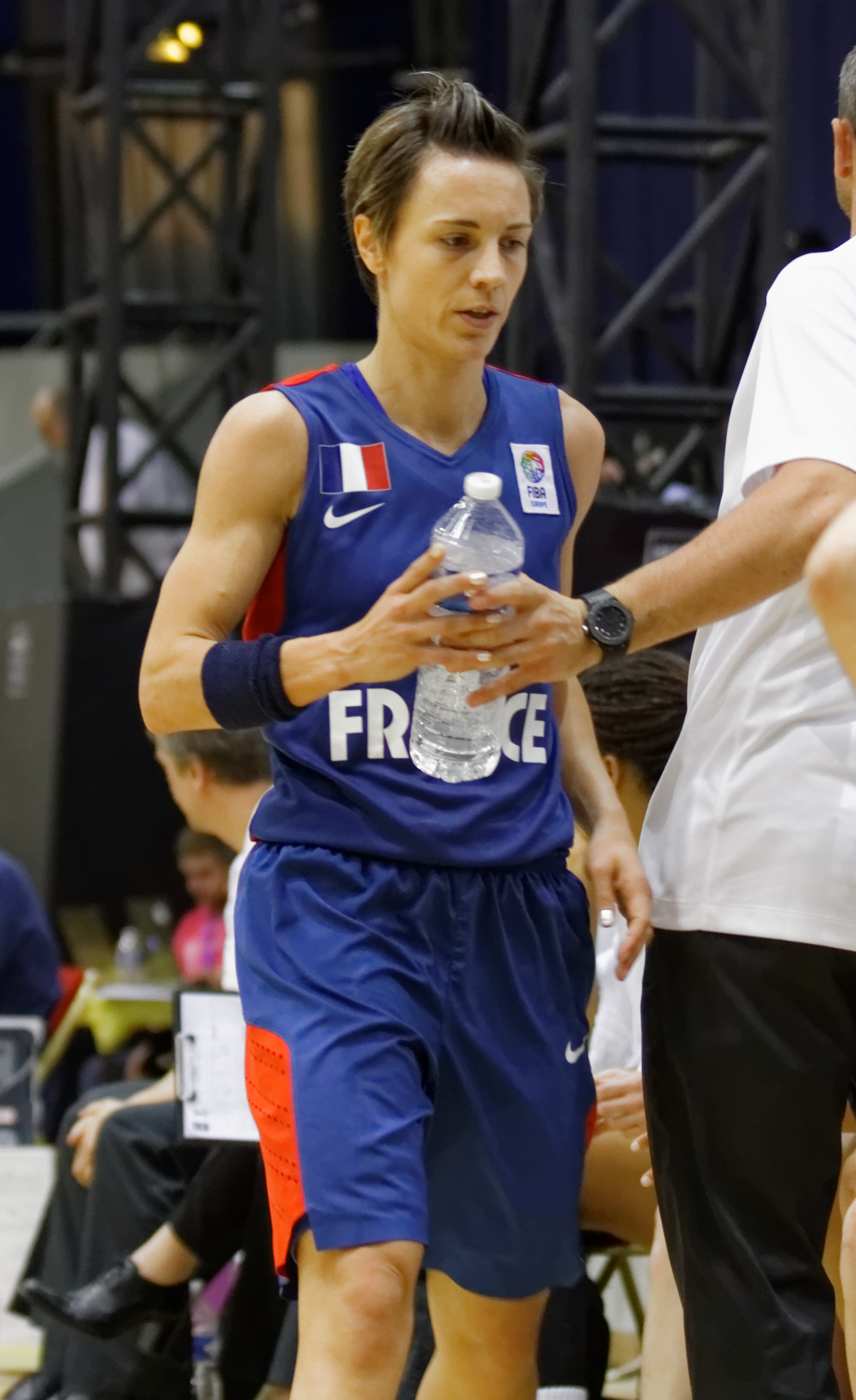
Céline Dumerc

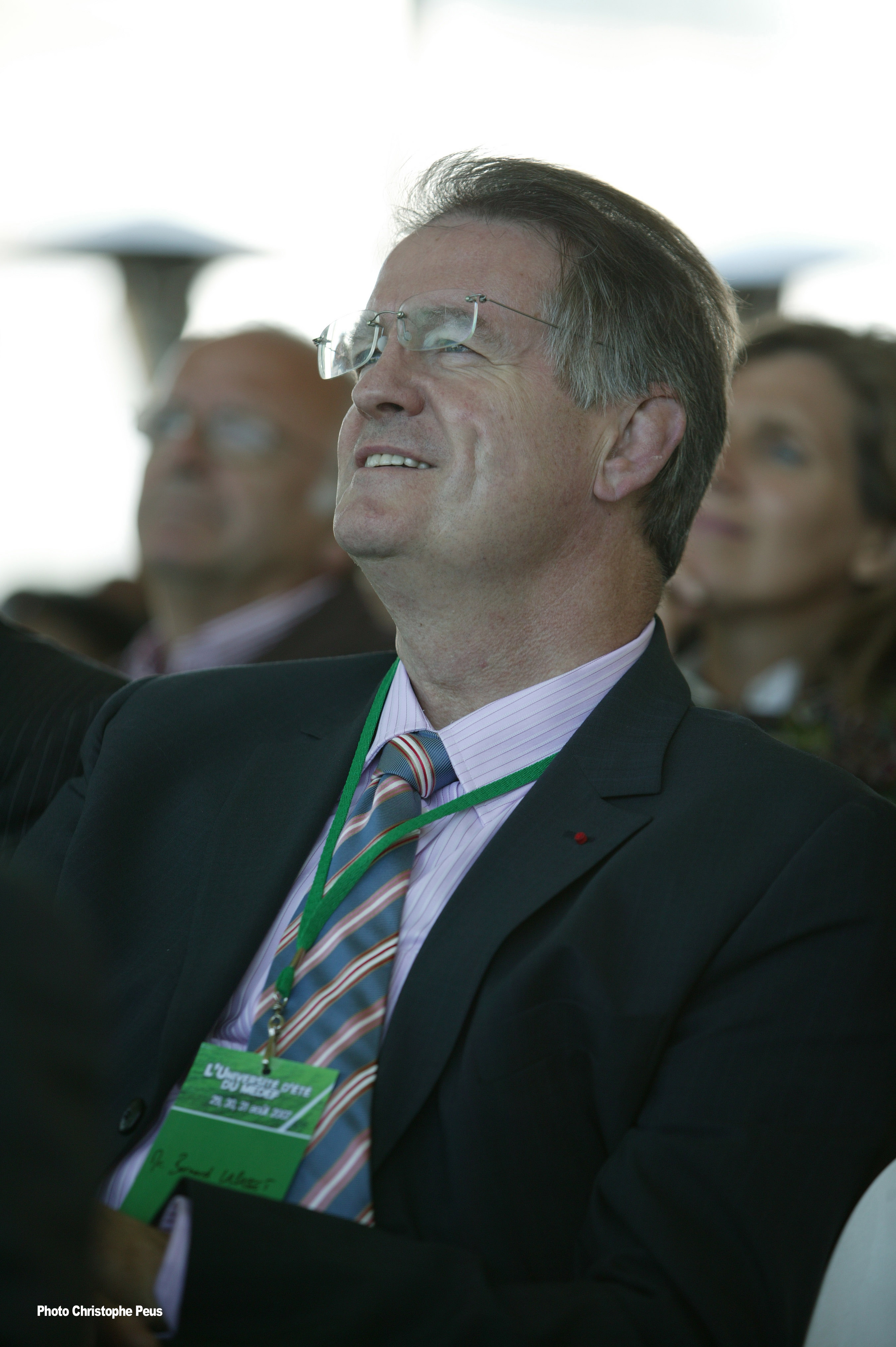
Bernard Lapasset

- Frank Adisson (born 1969), slalom canoeist, gold medallist at the 1996 Summer Olympics
- William Ayache (born 1960) footballer with 237 club caps and 20 for France
- Olivier Azam (born 1974), former Rugby Union player with 10 caps for France
- Patrick Baldassara (born 1952), former footballer with 222 club caps.
- Edmond Baraffe (1942–2020), former footballer with over 150 club caps and 3 for France
- Lionel Beauxis (born 1985), rugby player with 23 caps for France
- Xavier Bécas (born 1979), football player with over 200 club caps
- Philippe Bérot (born 1965), former Rugby player with 19 caps for France, now coaches Italy national rugby union team.
- Christian Carrère (born 1943), former rugby union player with 28 caps for France.
- Mathieu Crépel (born 1984), French snowboarder
- Philippe Delrieu (born 1959) a former fencer, silver medallist at the 1984 Summer Olympics
- Philippe Dintrans (born 1957), Rugby hooker, captain of France with 51 caps.
- Céline Dumerc (born 1982), basketball player, captain of the team France
- Sandra Forgues (born 1969), double Slalom canoe Olympic Champion in Atlanta in 1996, and bronze four years earlier in the Barcelona Olympics; a trans woman
- Aubin Hueber (born 1967), former Rugby player with 21 caps for France
- Julien Laharrague (born 1978) Rugby Union player with 12 caps for France
- Nicolas Laharrague (born 1981) a rugby union footballer with 2 caps for France
- Bernard Lapasset (born 1947) rugby administrator, Chairman of the World Rugby 2008/2016.
- Wenceslas Lauret (born 1987), rugby player with 27 caps for France
- Nicolas Lopez (born 1980), sabre fencer, gold medallist at the 2008 Summer Olympics.
- Georges Roes (1889–1945), sport shooter, silver medals at 1920 & 1924 Summer Olympics
- Jean-Luc Sassus (1962–2015), footballer with 493 club caps and 1 for France.
- Gabriel Sempé (1901–1990), hurdler at the 1924 and 1928 Summer Olympics, scholar and collector of fine art
- Adrien Théaux (born 1984), alpine skier, competed at 3 x Winter Olympics
- Gaël Touya (born 1973) & Damien Touya (born 1975) & Anne-Lise Touya (born 1981) a family of French fencers; won several medals in sabre teams at several Summer Olympics.

=== Writers ===
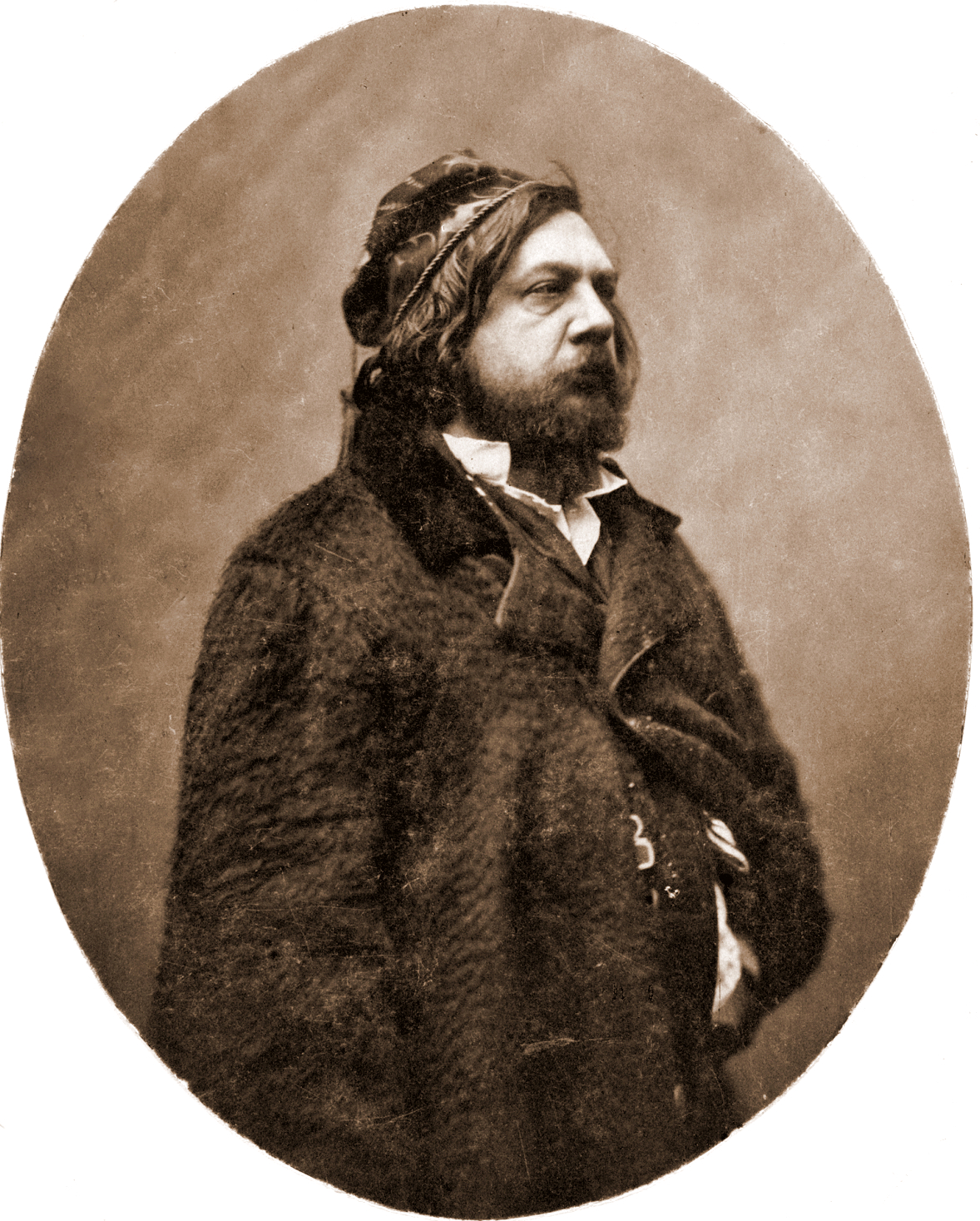
Théophile Gautier, c. 1856

- Maurice Audebert (1923-2012), philosopher, novelist and dramatist
- Charles Dantzig (born 1961), writer and editor, won the Prix Jean Freustié and Prix Roger Nimier in 2003
- Henri-Paul Eydoux (1907–1986), writer
- Théophile Gautier (1811–1872), poet, dramatist, novelist, journalist and art and literary critic.
- Christian Laborde (born 1955), writer
- Jules Laforgue (1860–1887), Franco-Uruguayan Symbolist poet, enrolled in Tarbes in 1887.
- Comte de Lautréamont (1846–1870), poet, enrolled at Lycée Théophile Gautier in 1859
- Christine de Rivoyre (1921–2019), a journalist and writer.
- Laurent Tailhade (1854–1919), satirical poet, anarchist and polemicist,

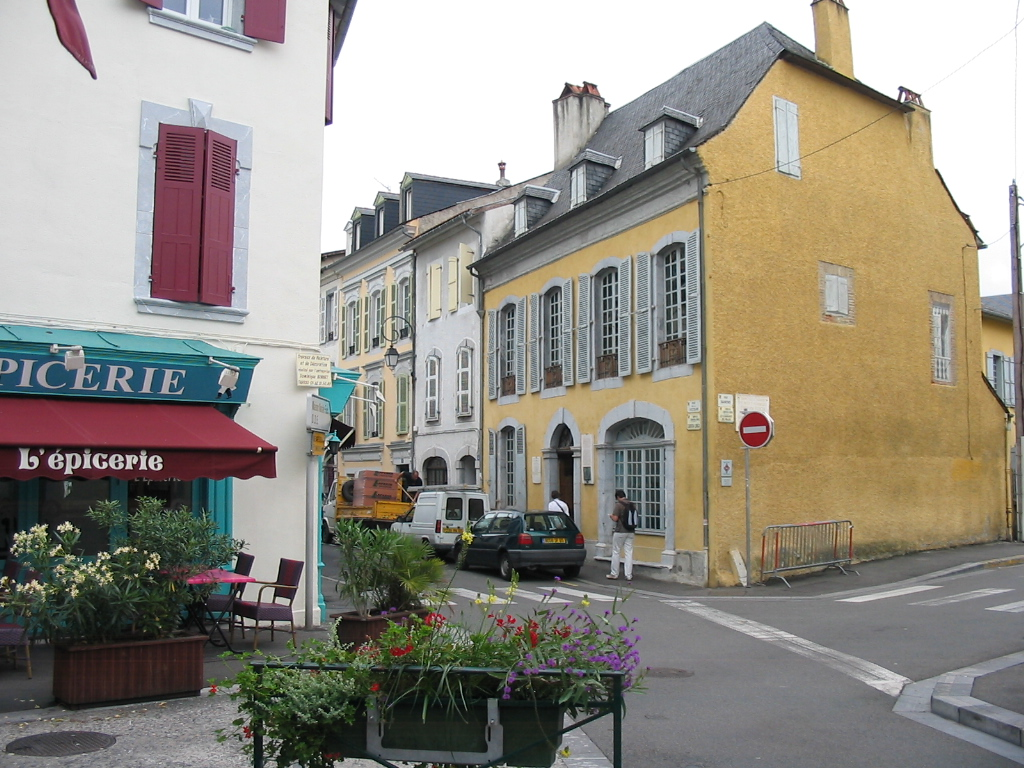
Birthplace of Ferdinand Foch

=== Military ===
- Joseph Hyacinthe Louis Jules d'Ariès (1813–1878), naval officer & Governor of Cochinchina
- Pierre Emmanuel Félix Chazal (1808–1882), Belgian general (naturalised in 1844)
- Jean Dembarrère (1747–1828), general of division of Napoleon I, from a noble family
- Ferdinand Foch (1851–1929) Marshal of France (1918), commander-in-chief of Allied forces in WWI
- Jean Pinet (born 1929), aviator and aeronautical engineer; first to fly Concorde supersonic

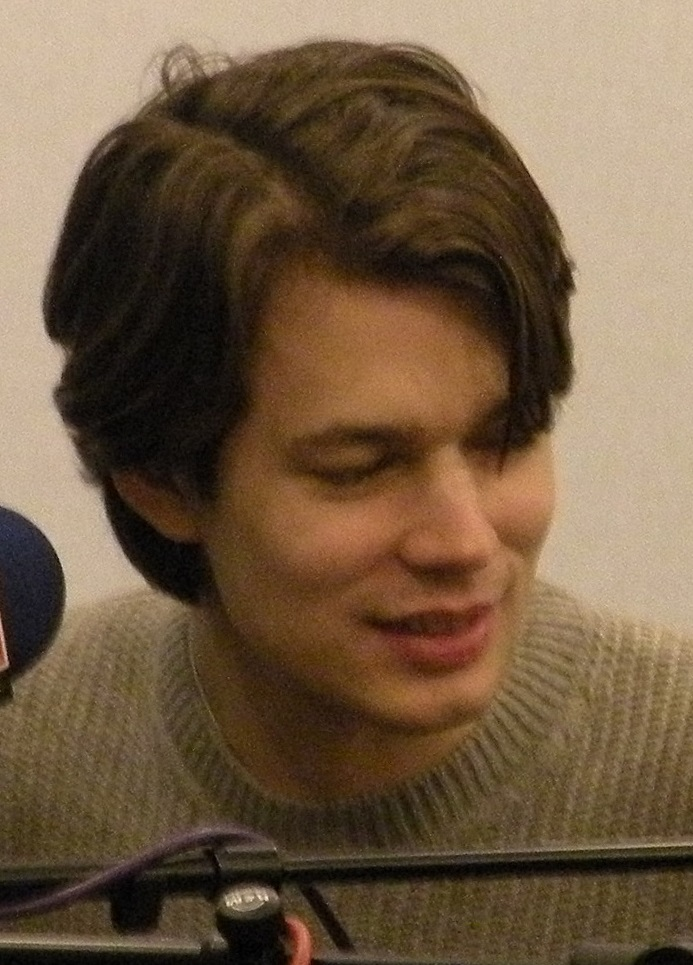
David Fray, 2009

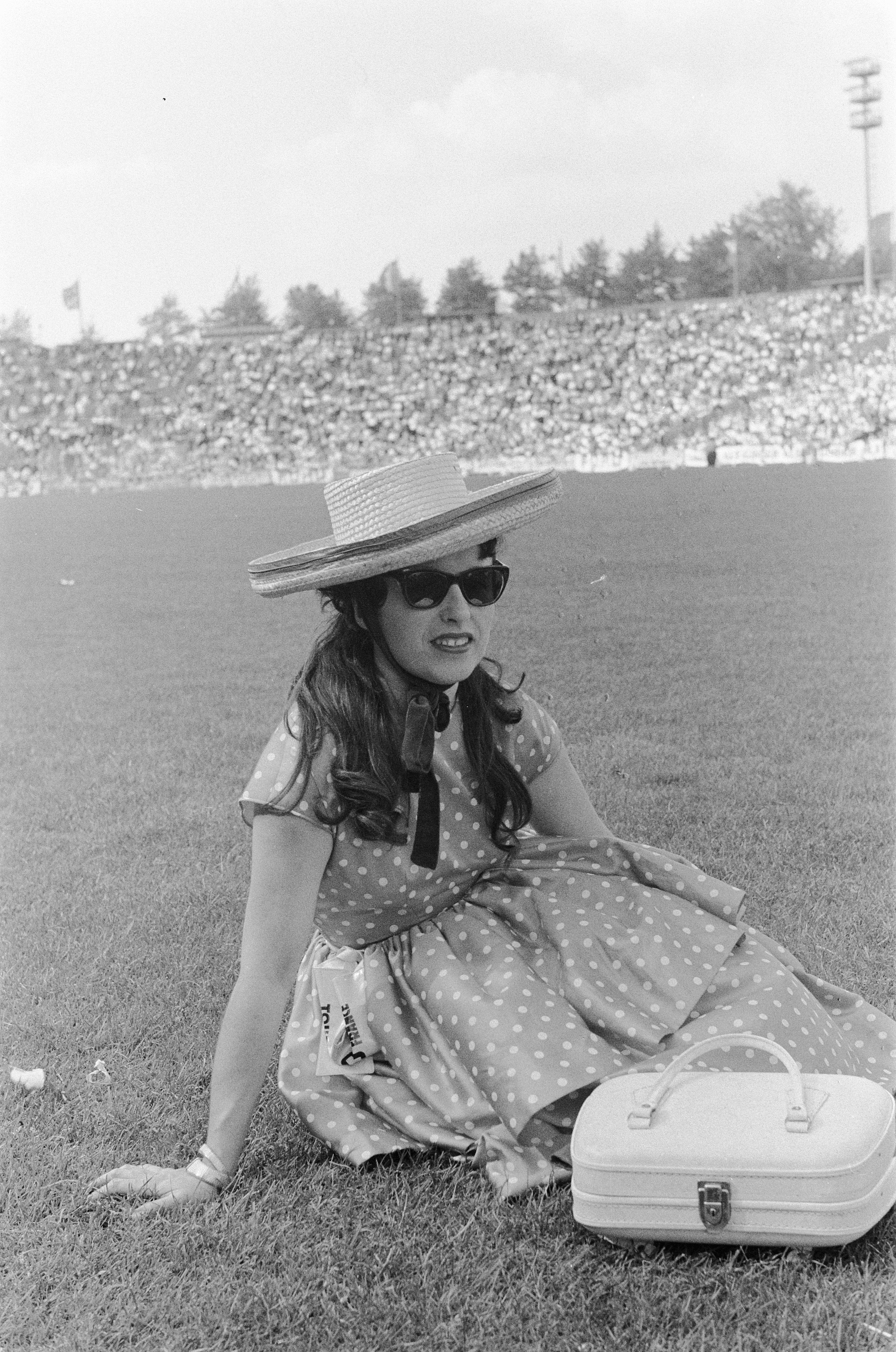
Yvette Horner, 1960

=== Musicians, singers & actors ===
- Jean-Louis Blèze (1927–2012), French humourist, born in Sarrouilles but frequented Tarbes.
- Boulevard des airs (formed in 2004), French pop/rock group formed in the Lycée Marie Curie
- Auguste-Maurice Cocagnac (1924–2006), Dominican friar, painter, cartoonist and songwriter
- Sandra Colombo (born 1977), comedian
- François Deguelt (1932–2014), singer songwriter
- Marianne Dissard (born 1969), singer, lyricist, author and filmmaker
- David Fray (born 1981), classical virtuoso pianist.
- Henri Génès (1919–2005), a singer and actor
- Agnès Gayraud (born 1979), philosopher, journalist, singer-songwriter, stage name La Féline
- Yvette Horner (1922–2018), accordionist, pianist and composer
- Robert Kaddouch (born 1958), concert pianist and international teacher
- Christophe Lacassagne (born 1964), contemporary baritone.
- Víctor Mirecki Larramat (1847–1921), cellist and music teacher
- Fano Messan (1902–1998), actress, sculptor, painter; known for her androgyny
- Cécile Ousset (born 1936), a French pianist.
- Sangria gratuite (formed 1998) trio of festive musicians
- Gilles Servat (born 1945), singer and musician
- Édouard Souberbielle (1899–1986), organist, Kapellmeister and music educator.

=== Painters and sculptors ===
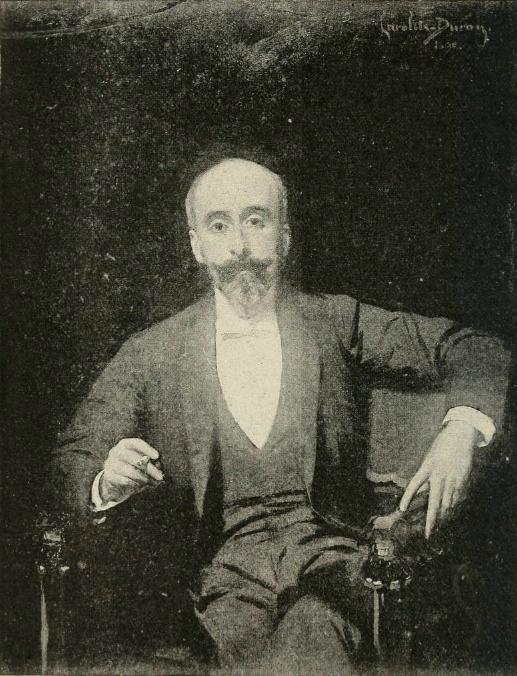
René Billotte, 1891

- Henri Borde (1888-1958), painter
- René Billotte (1846-1915), artist and painter
- Jacqueline Dauriac (born 1945), artist
- Alfred Jean-Marie Paris (1848–1908), painter and illustrator
- Firmin Michelet (1875-1951), sculptor
- Jeane Saliceti (1883-1959), artist and painter

=== Business ===
- André Emlinger (1909–2005), military and business leader, originator of the Kennedy Centre
- Pierre Koffmann (born 1948), chef
- Placide Massey (1777–1853), pharmacist and botanist, benefactor of Tarbes

== Tarbes in the arts, literature and media ==
- Jean Paulhan, Les Fleurs de Tarbes ou La Terreur dans les Lettres [The Flowers of Tarbes or Terror in the Letters] (1936, 1941)
- Maurice Utrillo, Tarbes or Winter street scene in Tarbes (1935)
- Unlike the historical D'Artagnan, from Gers, the character of D'Artagnan in The Three Musketeers, by Alexandre Dumas, comes from Tarbes.
- The city of Tarbes is mentioned in the manga The Familiar of Zero, Chapter 28, page 8. It is the city where the hero goes to find a former war machine.
- La Féline's 2022 album, Tarbes. La Féline's singer and songwriter, Agnes Gyraud, is a native of Tarbes.

== International relations ==
Tarbes is twinned with:

- Huesca, Spain, from 7 May 1964
- Altenkirchen, Germany, from 24 June 1972
Blason of Huesca

Blason of Altenkirchen

== See also ==
- Bigorre
- Communes of the Hautes-Pyrénées department
- List of bishops of Tarbes
- DAHER-SOCATA
- Haras Nationaux
- 1st Parachute Hussar Regiment
- Communauté d'agglomération Tarbes-Lourdes-Pyrénées
