= Results of the 2024 French legislative election in Hautes-Pyrénées =

Following the first round of the 2024 French legislative election on 30 June 2024, runoff elections in each constituency where no candidate received a vote share greater than 50 percent were scheduled for 7 July. Candidates permitted to stand in the runoff elections needed to either come in first or second place in the first round or achieve more than 12.5 percent of the votes of the entire electorate (as opposed to 12.5 percent of the vote share due to low turnout).

== Hautes-Pyrénées ==
=== 1st constituency ===
Candidate	Party or alliance		First round		Second round	
Candidate	Party or alliance		Votes	%	Votes	%
Marie-Christine Sorin	National Rally		20,272	34.09	24,937	46.89
Sylvie Ferrer	New Popular Front	La France Insoumise	17,564	29.53	28,245	53.11
Jean-Bernard Sempastous	Ensemble	Renaissance	14,776	24.84		
Philippe Evon	The Republicans		3,047	5.12		
Pierre Claret	Regionalists	Résistons !	2,626	4.42		
Catherine Bonnecarrere	Reconquête		656	1.10		
Maria Saez	Far-left	Lutte Ouvrière	533	0.90		
Total			59,474	100.00	53,182	100.00
Valid votes			59,474	96.72	53,182	86.75
Invalid votes			634	1.03	2,320	3.78
Blank votes			1,386	2.25	5,805	9.47
Total votes			61,494	100.00	61,307	100.00
Registered voters/turnout			87,328	70.42	87,312	70.22

=== 2nd constituency ===
Candidate	Party or alliance		First round		Second round	
Candidate	Party or alliance		Votes	%	Votes	%
Olivier Monteil	National Rally		22,436	36.96	27,395	48.28
Denis Fégné	New Popular Front	Socialist Party	17,055	28.09	29,345	51.72
Benoit Mournet	Ensemble	Renaissance	15,121	24.91		
Jacques Béhague	The Republicans		3,184	5.24		
Jean-Marc Dabat	Regionalists	Résistons !	1,486	2.45		
Claude Alves Da Cunha	Reconquête		735	1.21		
François Meunier	Far-left	Lutte Ouvrière	692	1.14		
Ali El Marsni	Independent		0	0.00		
Total			60,709	100.00	56,740	100.00
Valid votes			60,709	96.68	56,740	90.17
Invalid votes			662	1.05	1,655	2.63
Blank votes			1,422	2.26	4,531	7.20
Total votes			62,793	100.00	62,926	100.00
Registered voters/turnout			88,496	70.96	88,507	71.10
