= Lourdaise =

French breed of cattle

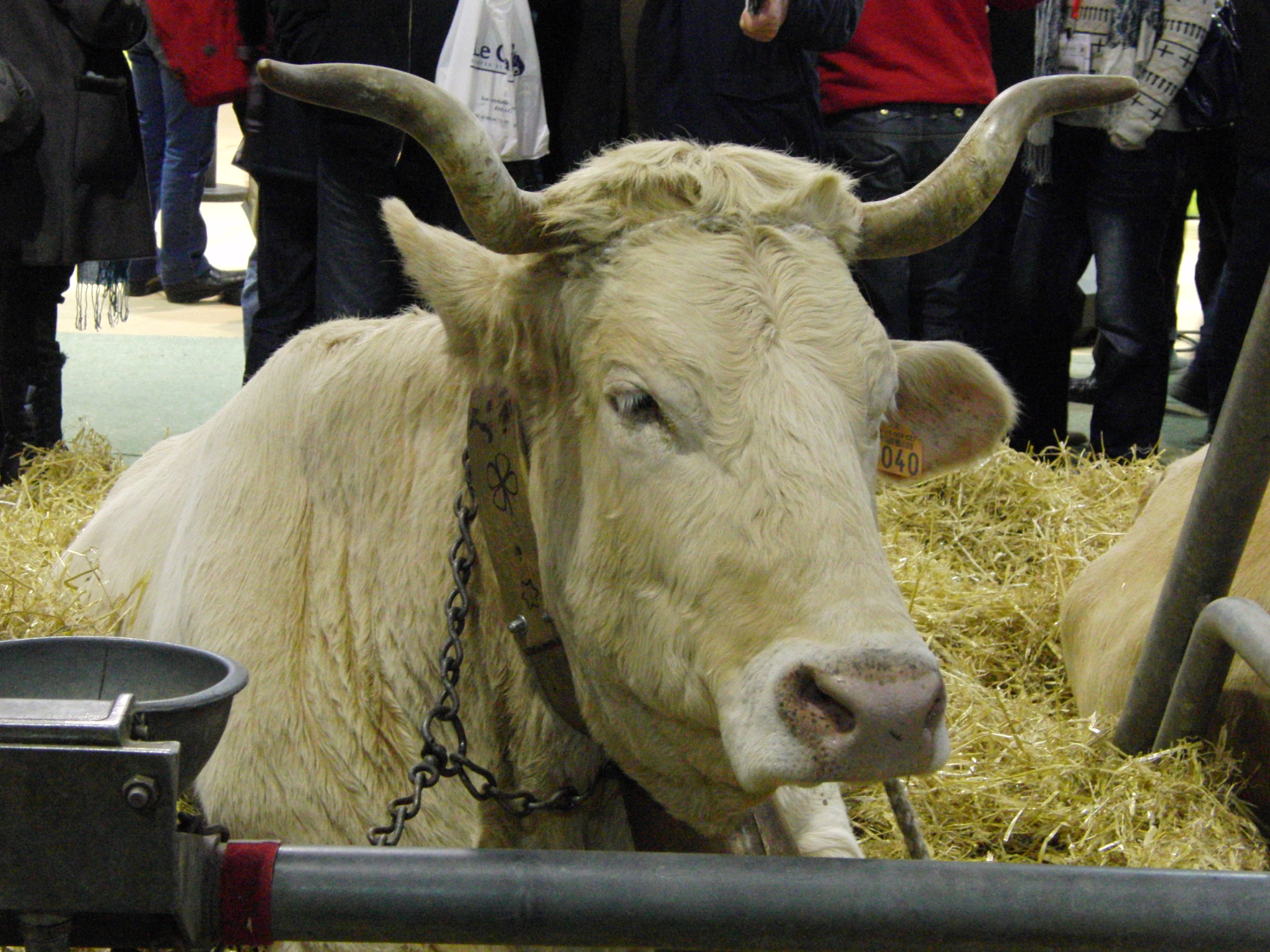
- Cow at the Salon international de l'agriculture de Paris, 2013
- Conservation status: FAO (2007): critical-maintained
- Country of origin: France
- Distribution: Midi-Pyrénées
- Use: formerly triple-purpose, meat, milk and draught; now mainly meat

Traits
- Weight: Male: 900–1100 kg; Female: 600 kg
- Height: Female: 135 cm
- Skin colour: white
- Coat: white or creamy white
- Horn status: lyre-shaped
- Cattle; Bos (primigenius) taurus

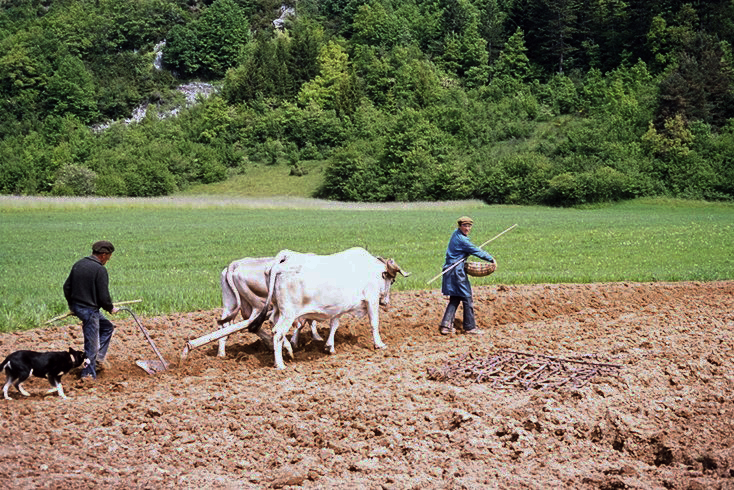
A pair of cows working in the Pyrénées in the 1970s

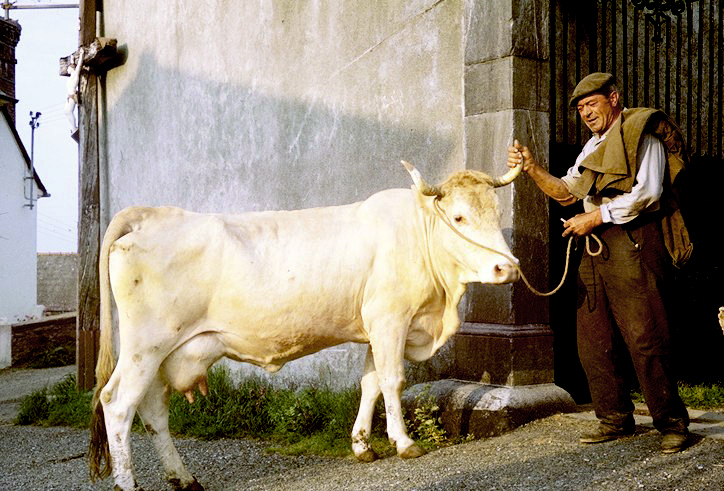
Cow at Bourreac in the 1960s

The Lourdaise (Gascon: Lordés) is an endangered French breed of domestic cattle. It is named for the town of Lourdes, in the Hautes-Pyrénées département of the region of Occitanie, and originated in the surrounding country, particularly in the cantons of Argelès, Bagnères-de-Bigorre and Ossun. It was formerly a triple-purpose breed, kept for its milk, for its meat and for draught work. It was widely distributed in the Pyrénées of south-western France. It came close to extinction in the 1980s, but has since recovered following conservation efforts. It remains critically endangered.

== History ==
The Lourdaise originated in the rural areas surrounding Lourdes, now in the Hautes-Pyrénées département of Occitanie. It was particularly associated with the cantons of Argelès, Bagnères-de-Bigorre and Ossun, but was widely distributed in the area. It was the principal cattle breed of the traditional regions of the Bigorre and of the Lavedan. A herd-book was established in the 1890s, and in 1896 it held a total of 850 animals. At the beginning of the twentieth century there were some 25 000 head; more than 200 bulls were approved for public use as sires.

Breed numbers fell drastically in the years following the Second World War, for three reasons: the mechanisation of agriculture meant that there was decreased demand for draught cattle; specialised single-purpose breeds, such as the Braunvieh and Friesian for milk and the Charolaise and Limousine for beef, were introduced to the area; and in 1960, Edmond Quittet, the Inspecteur général de l'agriculture, established a policy of reduction of the number of French minority breeds. By 1983, only 30 Lourdaise cows remained. Conservation efforts were begun, with contributions from the Parc National des Pyrénées, the French Ministry of Agriculture, and the regional administration of Haute-Pyrénées.

The Lourdaise was listed as "critical-maintained" by the Food and Agriculture Organization of the United Nations in 2007. In 2014 the total population was reported to be 268.

== Characteristics ==
The Lourdaise is white or cream-coloured. The skin is white and the muzzle and mucous areas are pale. The inner side of the thigh and the surround of the eyes and of the muzzle is white.

== Use ==
The Lourdaise was formerly a triple-purpose breed, kept for its milk, for its meat and for draught work. Milk production is estimated at 3000 litres in a lactation of 305 days; fat content is about 3.8% and protein about 3.3%. There is enough milk for naturally-fed milk veal production.
