= Ibos =

Ibos may refer to:

- The Igbo or Ibo people, an ethnic group of Nigeria
- Ibos, a commune of the Hautes-Pyrénées département, in southwestern France
