= Hautes-Pyrénées's 1st constituency =

Constituency of the National Assembly of France

1st constituency of the Hautes-Pyrénées
- inline Constituency of the National Assembly of France

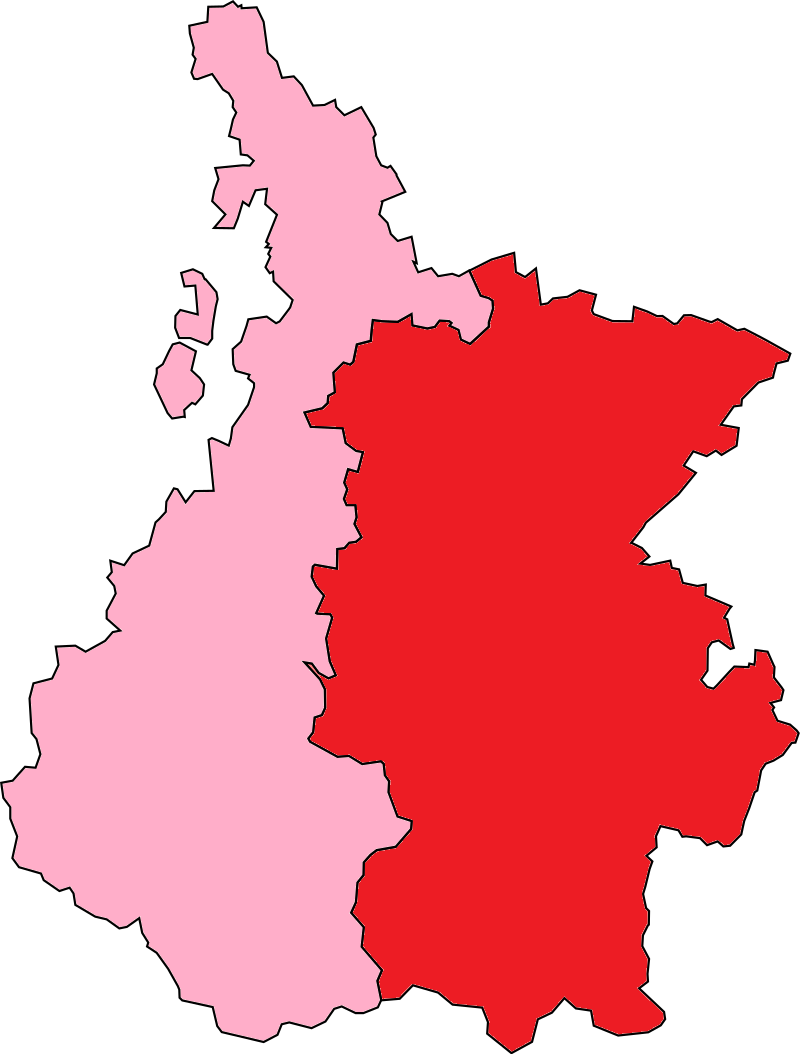
- Hautes-Pyrénées's 1st Constituency shown within the Hautes-Pyrénées

- Hautes-Pyrénées in France
- Deputy: Sylvie Ferrer; LFI
- Department: Hautes-Pyrénées
- Cantons: (pre-2015) Arreau, Aureilhan, Bagnères-de-Bigorre, La Barthe-de-Neste, Bordères-Louron, Campan, Castelnau-Magnoac, Galan, Lannemezan, Mauléon-Barousse, Pouyastruc, Saint-Laurent-de-Neste, Séméac, Tarbes I, Tarbes III, Tarbes IV, Tournay, Trie-sur-Baïse, Vieille-Aure
- Registered voters: 88311

The 1st constituency of the Hautes-Pyrénées (French: Première circonscription des Hautes-Pyrénées) is a French legislative constituency in the Hautes-Pyrénées département. Like the other 576 French constituencies, it elects one MP using a two round electoral system.

== Description ==
The 1st constituency of Hautes-Pyrénées covers the east of the department including part of Tarbes, the rest being in Hautes-Pyrénées's 2nd constituency.

The constituency was historically generally supportive of Socialist Party candidates with the exceptions of 1993 until 2017. In 2017 the incumbent PS candidate came third in the first round of voting behind both En Marche! and the left-wing La France Insoumise. In 2022, the incumbent En Marche! deputy was defeated by Sylvie Ferrer of La France Insoumise.

== Assembly Members ==
Election	Member	Party
1988	Pierre Forgues	PS
1993	Gérard Trémège	UDF
1995	Pierre Forgues	PS
1997	Pierre Forgues	PS
2002	Pierre Forgues	PS
2007	Pierre Forgues	PS
2012	Jean Glavany	PS
2017	Jean-Bernard Sempastous	LREM
2022	Sylvie Ferrer	LFI

== Election results ==
=== 2024 ===
Candidate	Party	Alliance	First round		Second round	
Candidate	Party	Alliance	Votes	%	Votes	%
Sylvie Ferrer	LFI	NPF	17,564	29.53	28,245	53.11
Marie-Christine Sorin	RN		20,272	34.09	24,937	46.89
Sylvie Gabin	REN	Ensemble	14,776	24.84		
Pierre Claret	Résistons!	Reg	2,626	4.42		
Catherine Bonnecarrere	R!		1.10	1.10		
Maria Saez	LO		533	0.90		
Valid votes			59,474	96.72	53,182	86.75
Blank votes			1,386	2.25	5,805	9.47
Null votes			634	1.03	2,320	3.78
Turnout			61,494	70.42	61,307	70.22
Abstentions			25,834	29.58	26,005	29.78
Registered voters			87,328		87,312	
Result			LFI HOLD			

=== 2022 ===
Legislative Election 2022: Hautes-Pyrénées's 1st constituency
Party	Candidate	Votes	%	±%
LFI (NUPÉS)	Sylvie Ferrer	11,540	24.69	-12.92
LREM (Ensemble)	Jean-Bernard Sempastous	11,029	23.59	-19.56
PS	Maryse Beyrie*	9,317	19.93	N/A
RN	Marie-Christine Sorin	7,396	15.82	+4.98
LR (UDC)	Romain Giral	2,328	4.98	N/A
R!	Pierre Claret	1,768	3.78	N/A
REC	Catherine Bonnecarrere	1,684	3.60	N/A
DIV	Ophélie Guenichot	1,048	2.24	N/A
Others	N/A	634	1.36	
Turnout		46,744	54.30	+1.49
2nd round result
LFI (NUPÉS)	Sylvie Ferrer	20,657	50.13	+8.99
LREM (Ensemble)	Jean-Bernard Sempastous	20,552	49.87	−8.99
Turnout		41,209	52.65	+3.90
LFI gain from LREM				

* PS dissident

=== 2017 ===
Results of the 11 June and 18 June 2017 French National Assembly election in Hautes-Pyrénées’ 1st Constituency
Candidate	Party		1st round		2nd round	
Candidate	Party		Votes	%	Votes	%
Jean-Bernard Sempastous	La République En Marche!	LREM	19,437	43.15	23,033	58.86
Sylvie Ferrer	La France Insoumise	FI	6,949	15.43	16,102	41.14
Jean Galvany	Socialist Party	PS	6,583	14.61		
Geneviève Comont	National Front	FN	4,885	10.84		
Philippe Lacoume	Communist Party	PCF	1,893	4.20		
Henri Lourdou	Ecologist	ECO	1,520	3.37		
Jean-Bernard Achard	Miscellaneous Right	DVD	1,370	3.04		
Laurent Verdoux	Independent	DIV	605	1.34		
Habib Labed	Debout la France	DLF	557	1.24		
Quentin Caulliez	Independent	DIV	413	0.92		
Maria Saez	Far Left	EXG	348	0.77		
Véronique Carrere	Miscellaneous Left	DVG	284	0.63		
Raphaël Isla	Independent	DIV	206	0.46		
Thierry Giron	Independent	DIV	0	0.00		
Total			45,050	100%	39,135	100%
Registered voters			88,323		88,311	
Blank/Void ballots			1,590	3.41%	3,919	9.10%
Turnout			46,640	52.81%	43,054	48.75%
Abstentions			41,683	47.19%	45,257	51.25%
Result					REM GAIN FROM PS	

=== 2012 ===
Results of the 10 June and 17 June 2012 French National Assembly election in Hautes-Pyrénées’ 1st Constituency
Candidate	Party		1st round		2nd round	
Candidate	Party		Votes	%	Votes	%
Jean Glavany	Socialist Party	PS	25,163	47.73	33,413	66.91
Gérard Tremege	Radical Party	PRV	13,864	26.30	16,523	33.09
Claude Martin	Left Front	FG	5,727	10.86		
Alexandre Goessens	National Front	FN	3,852	7.31		
Jean-Marc Luce	Europe Ecology – The Greens	EELV	2,029	3.85		
Denis Tajan	The Centre for France	CEN	1,116	2.12		
Irène Zambettakis	Far Left	EXG	382	0.72		
Robert Duffau	Miscellaneous Right	DVD	367	0.70		
Maria Saez	Far Left	EXG	218	0.41		
Total			52,718	100%	49,936	100%
Registered voters			88,400		88,431	
Blank/Void ballots			1,040	1.93%	2,204	4.23%
Turnout			53,758	60.81%	52,140	58.96%
Abstentions			34,642	39.19%	36,291	41.04%
Result					PS HOLD	

=== 2007 ===
Results of the 10 June and 17 June 2007 French National Assembly election in Hautes-Pyrénées’ 1st Constituency
Candidate	Party		1st round		2nd round	
Candidate	Party		Votes	%	Votes	%
Pierre Forgues	Socialist Party	PS	14,121	37.59	22,465	60.77
Monique Lamon	Union for a Popular Movement	UMP	9,141	24.33	14,505	39.23
Rolland Castells	UDF-Democratic Movement	UDF-MoDem	5,746	15.29		
Louis Lages	Miscellaneous Left	DVG	2,012	5.36		
Erick Barrouquere-Theil	Communist Party	PCF	1,996	5.31		
Christiane Alias	Far Left	EXG	1,239	3.30		
Cathy Chateau	The Greens	LV	996	2.65		
Christiane Fourcade	National Front	FN	876	2.33		
Thierry Delattre	Ecologist	ECO	402	1.07		
Sandrine Raffel	Independent	DIV	362	0.96		
Claire Cheminade	Presidential Majority	MP	257	0.68		
Maria Saez	Far Left	EXG	238	0.63		
Louise Garnier	Far Right	EXD	182	0.48		
Total			37,568	100%	36,970	100%
Registered voters			60,115		60,111	
Blank/Void ballots			1,106	2.86%	2,051	5.26%
Turnout			38,674	64.33%	39,021	64.91%
Abstentions			21,441	35.67%	21,090	35.09%
Result					PS HOLD	

=== 2002 ===
Results of the 9 June and 16 June 2002 French National Assembly election in Hautes-Pyrénée’s Constituency
Candidate	Party		1st round		2nd round	
Candidate	Party		Votes	%	Votes	%
Pierre Forgues	Socialist Party	PS	15,802	41.22	20,929	57.62
Patrick Butor	Union for a Presidential Majority	UMP	11,251	29.35	15,394	42.38
Christiane Fourcade	National Front	FN	2,518	6.57		
Bernard Dupin	Hunting, Fishing, Nature and Traditions	CPNT	2,340	6.10		
Michel Cassagne	Communist Party	PCF	2,262	5.90		
Sandra Ipas	Revolutionary Communist League	LCR	1,024	2.67		
Olivier Clement Bollee	The Greens	LV	831	2.17		
Thierry Delattre	Ecologist	ECO	457	1.19		
Andree Chenuaud	Movement for France	MPF	437	1.14		
Maria Saez	Workers’ Struggle	LO	403	1.05		
J. Marie Barrere	National Republican Movement	MNR	352	0.92		
M. Pierre Dufetelle	Ecologist	ECO	224	0.58		
Roland Laporte	Independent	DIV	217	0.57		
J. Claude Duvois	Independent	DIV	171	0.45		
Patricia Cazeaux	Independent	DIV	50	0.13		
Total			38,339	100%	36,323	100%
Registered voters			59,171		59,173	
Blank/Void ballots			1,404	3.53%	2,153	5.60%
Turnout			39,743	67.17%	38,476	65.02%
Abstentions			19,428	32.83%	20,697	34.98%
Result					PS HOLD	
