= Chantal Robin-Rodrigo =

French politician

Member of the National Assembly for Hautes-Pyrénées's 2nd constituency
- In office 19 June 2002 – 17 June 2012
- Preceded by: Philippe Douste-Blazy
- Succeeded by: Jeanine Dubié

Member of the National Assembly for Hautes-Pyrénées's 3rd constituency
- In office 1997 – 18 June 2002
- Preceded by: Jean Glavany
- Succeeded by: Jean Glavany

Member of the Hautes-Pyrénées's Departmental council for Canton of Canton de Tarbes-2 (1998-2015) Canton de la Vallée des Gaves (2015-2021)
- In office 22 March 1998 – 27 Jun 2021
- Preceded by: Georges Danglade (Tarbes-2) new canton (Vallée des Gaves)
- Succeeded by: Andrée Doubrère (Tarbes-2) Maryse Carrère (Vallée des Gaves)

Personal details
- Born: 4 August 1948 (age 77) Aix-en-Provence, France
- Party: Radical Party of the Left

Chantal Robin-Rodrigo (born 4 August 1948 in Aix-en-Provence, Bouches-du-Rhône) was a member of the National Assembly of France. She represented the Hautes-Pyrénées department, and is a member of the Radical Party of the Left. She is of Spanish origin.
