= Chis, France =

Chis
- Commune
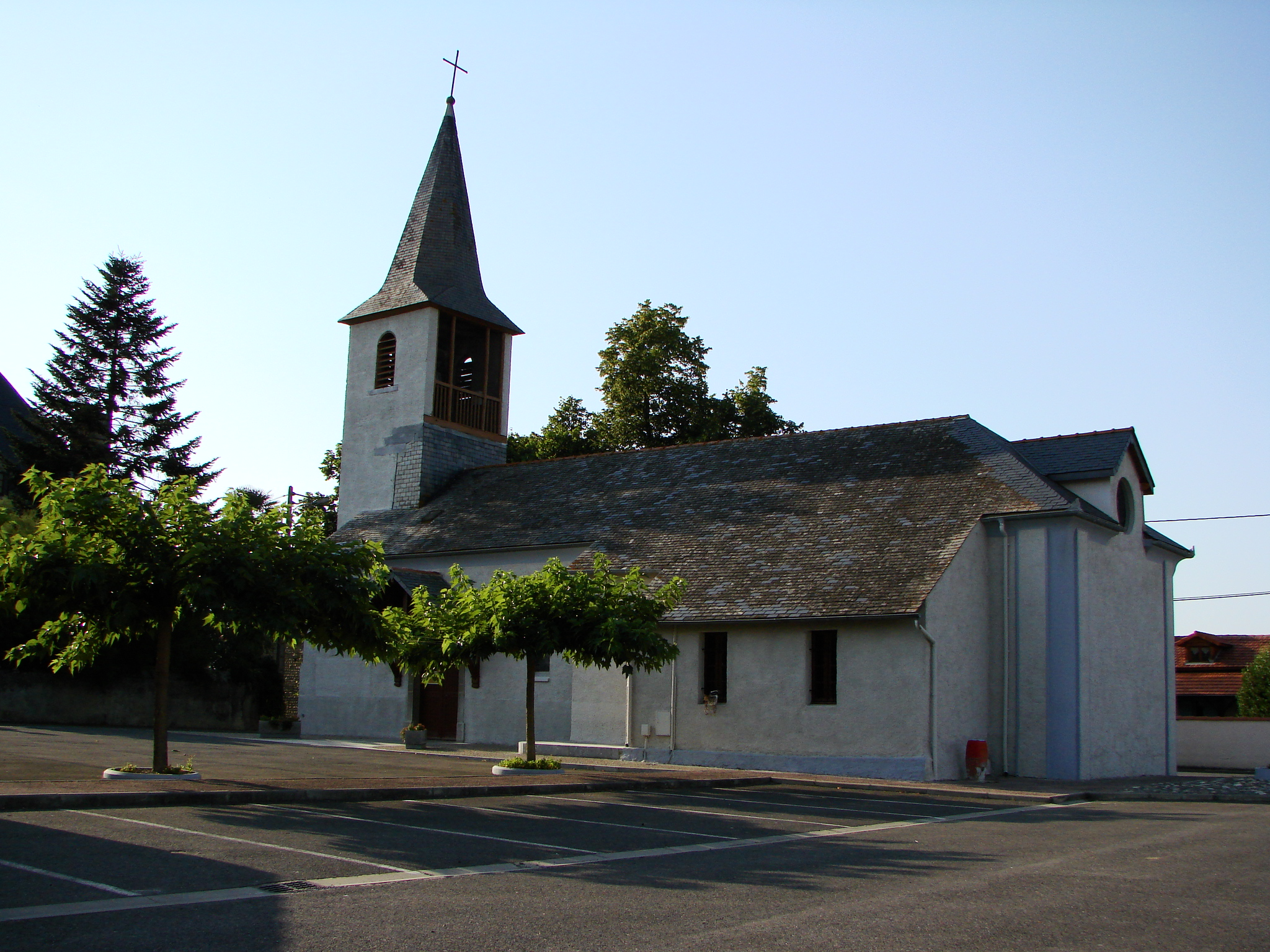
- Church and village square in the center of the town

- Coat of arms
- Location of Chis
- Location within France Location within Occitanie
- Coordinates: 43°17′41″N 0°07′18″E
- Country: France
- Region: Occitania
- Department: Hautes-Pyrénées
- Arrondissement: Tarbes
- Canton: Bordères-sur-l'Échez
- Intercommunality: CA Tarbes-Lourdes-Pyrénées

Government
  - Mayor (2020–2026): Bernard Lacoste
- Area^{1}: 3.74 km^{2} (1.44 sq mi)
- Elevation: 262 m (860 ft)
- Highest elevation: 276 m (906 ft)
- Lowest elevation: 256 m (840 ft)
- Population (2023): 297
  - Density: 79.4/km^{2} (206/sq mi)
- Time zone: UTC+01:00 (CET)
  - Summer (DST): UTC+02:00 (CEST)
- INSEE/Postal code: 65146 /65800
- ^{1} French Land Register data, which excludes lakes, ponds, glaciers > 1 km^{2} (0.386 sq mi or 247 acres) and river estuaries.

Chis is a commune in the Hautes-Pyrénées department in south-western France.

== See also ==
- Communes of the Hautes-Pyrénées department
