= Oursbelille =

- Commune
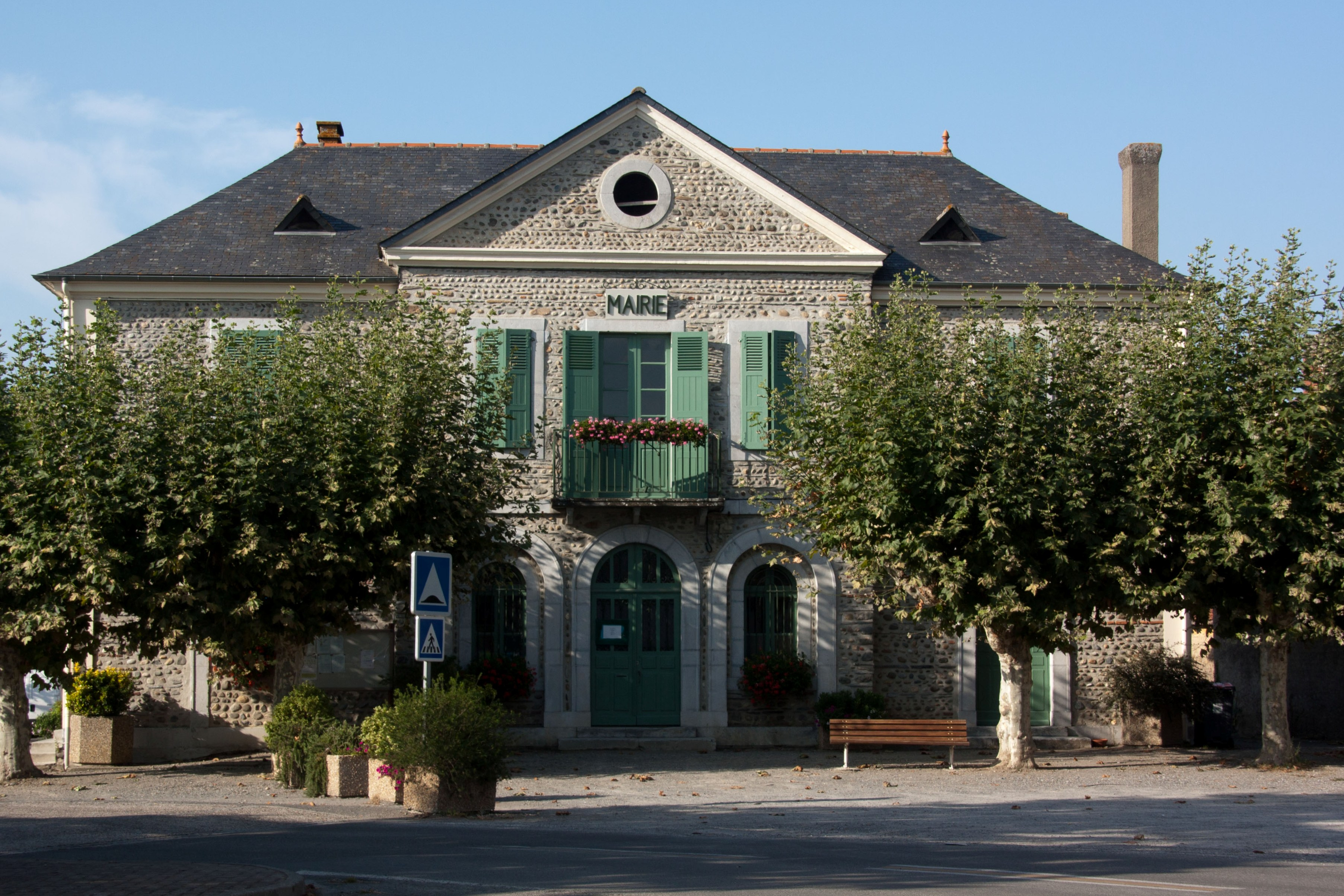
- The town hall

- Coat of arms
- Location of Oursbelille
- Location within France Location within Occitanie
- Coordinates: 43°17′16″N 0°02′18″E
- Country: France
- Region: Occitania
- Department: Hautes-Pyrénées
- Arrondissement: Tarbes
- Canton: Bordères-sur-l'Échez
- Intercommunality: CA Tarbes-Lourdes-Pyrénées

Government
  - Mayor (2020–2026): Henri Fatta
- Area^{1}: 11.33 km^{2} (4.37 sq mi)
- Elevation: 270 m (890 ft)
- Highest elevation: 376 m (1,234 ft)
- Lowest elevation: 259 m (850 ft)
- Population (2023): 1,222
  - Density: 107.9/km^{2} (279.3/sq mi)
- Time zone: UTC+01:00 (CET)
  - Summer (DST): UTC+02:00 (CEST)
- INSEE/Postal code: 65350 /65490
- ^{1} French Land Register data, which excludes lakes, ponds, glaciers > 1 km^{2} (0.386 sq mi or 247 acres) and river estuaries.

Oursbelille (French pronunciation: [uʁsbelil]; Occitan: Ors Belila) is a commune in the Hautes-Pyrénées department in south-western France.

== See also ==
- Communes of the Hautes-Pyrénées department
