= Bours =

Bours may refer to:

- Bours, Pas-de-Calais, a commune in France
- Bours, Hautes-Pyrénées, a commune in France
- Robinson Bours family, a Mexican family of Anglo-American/Anglo-French origin.
