= Bordères-sur-l'Échez =

- Commune
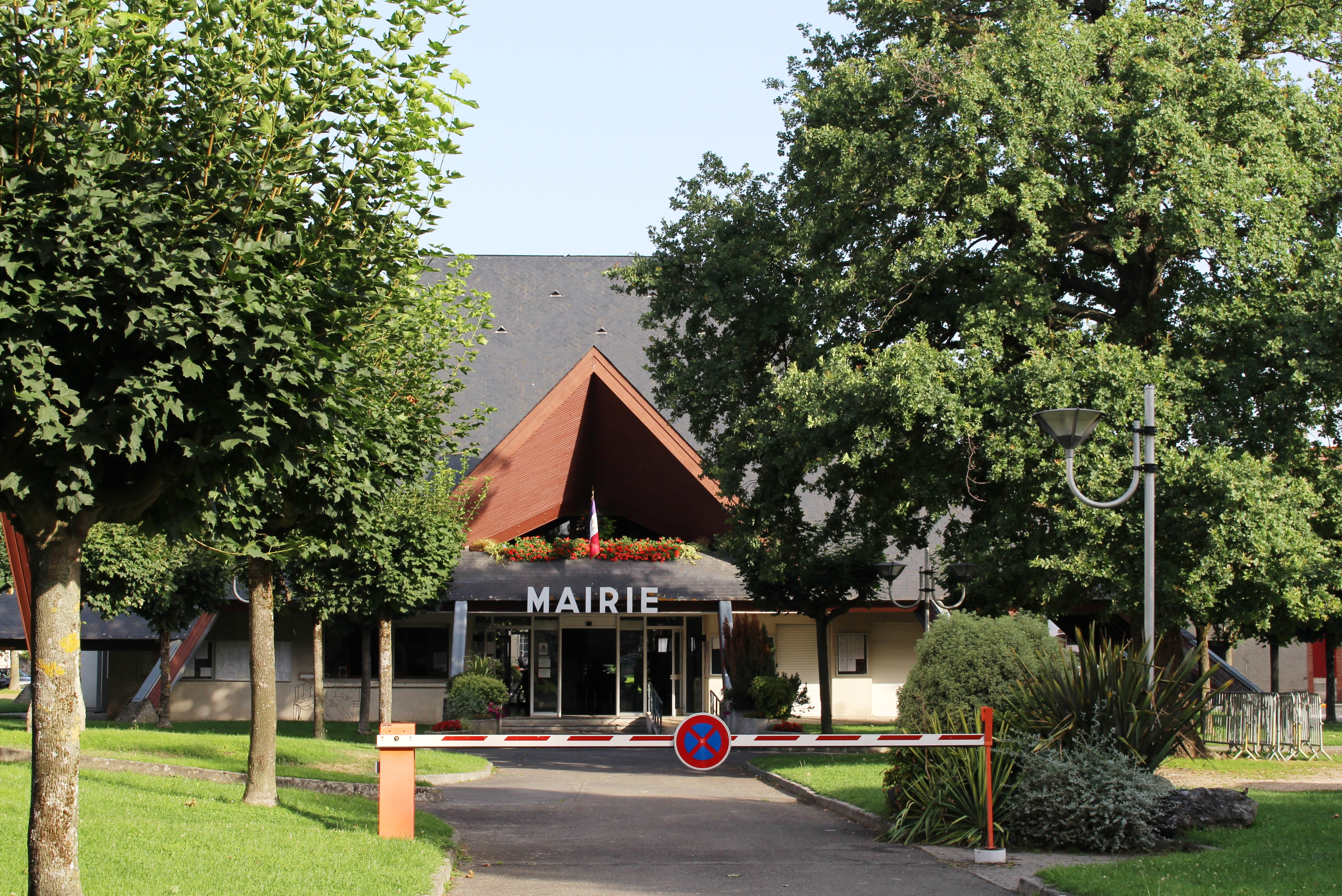
- View of town hall of Bordères-sur-l'Échez

- Coat of arms
- Location of Bordères-sur-l'Échez
- Location within France Location within Occitanie
- Coordinates: 43°16′N 0°03′E
- Country: France
- Region: Occitania
- Department: Hautes-Pyrénées
- Arrondissement: Tarbes
- Canton: Bordères-sur-l'Échez
- Intercommunality: CA Tarbes-Lourdes-Pyrénées

Government
  - Mayor (2020–2026): Jérôme Crampe
- Area^{1}: 15.95 km^{2} (6.16 sq mi)
- Elevation: 287 m (942 ft)
- Highest elevation: 378 m (1,240 ft)
- Lowest elevation: 273 m (896 ft)
- Population (2023): 5,399
  - Density: 338.5/km^{2} (876.7/sq mi)
- Time zone: UTC+01:00 (CET)
  - Summer (DST): UTC+02:00 (CEST)
- INSEE/Postal code: 65100 /65320
- ^{1} French Land Register data, which excludes lakes, ponds, glaciers > 1 km^{2} (0.386 sq mi or 247 acres) and river estuaries.

Bordères-sur-l'Échez (French pronunciation: [bɔʁdɛʁ syʁ leʃɛs], literally Bordères on the Échez; Occitan: Bordèras) is a commune in the Hautes-Pyrénées department in southwestern France. It is approximately 6 km northwest of Tarbes.

== Population ==
The inhabitants of the commune are known as Borderais in French, and have the nickname Les Cabilats.

Historical population
| Year | Pop. | ±% p.a. |
|---|---|---|
| 1968 | 2,950 | — |
| 1975 | 3,426 | +2.16% |
| 1982 | 3,712 | +1.15% |
| 1990 | 3,893 | +0.60% |
| 1999 | 3,551 | −1.02% |
| 2007 | 4,024 | +1.58% |
| 2012 | 4,639 | +2.89% |
| 2017 | 5,227 | +2.42% |
| 2023 | 5,399 | +0.54% |
Source: INSEE

== International relations ==
The commune of Bordères-sur-l'Échez was twinned with:

- Alcanar, Spain

== See also ==
- Communes of the Hautes-Pyrénées department
- Michèle Artigue, mathematician, born in Bordères-sur-l'Échez in 1946
