= Orleix =

- Commune
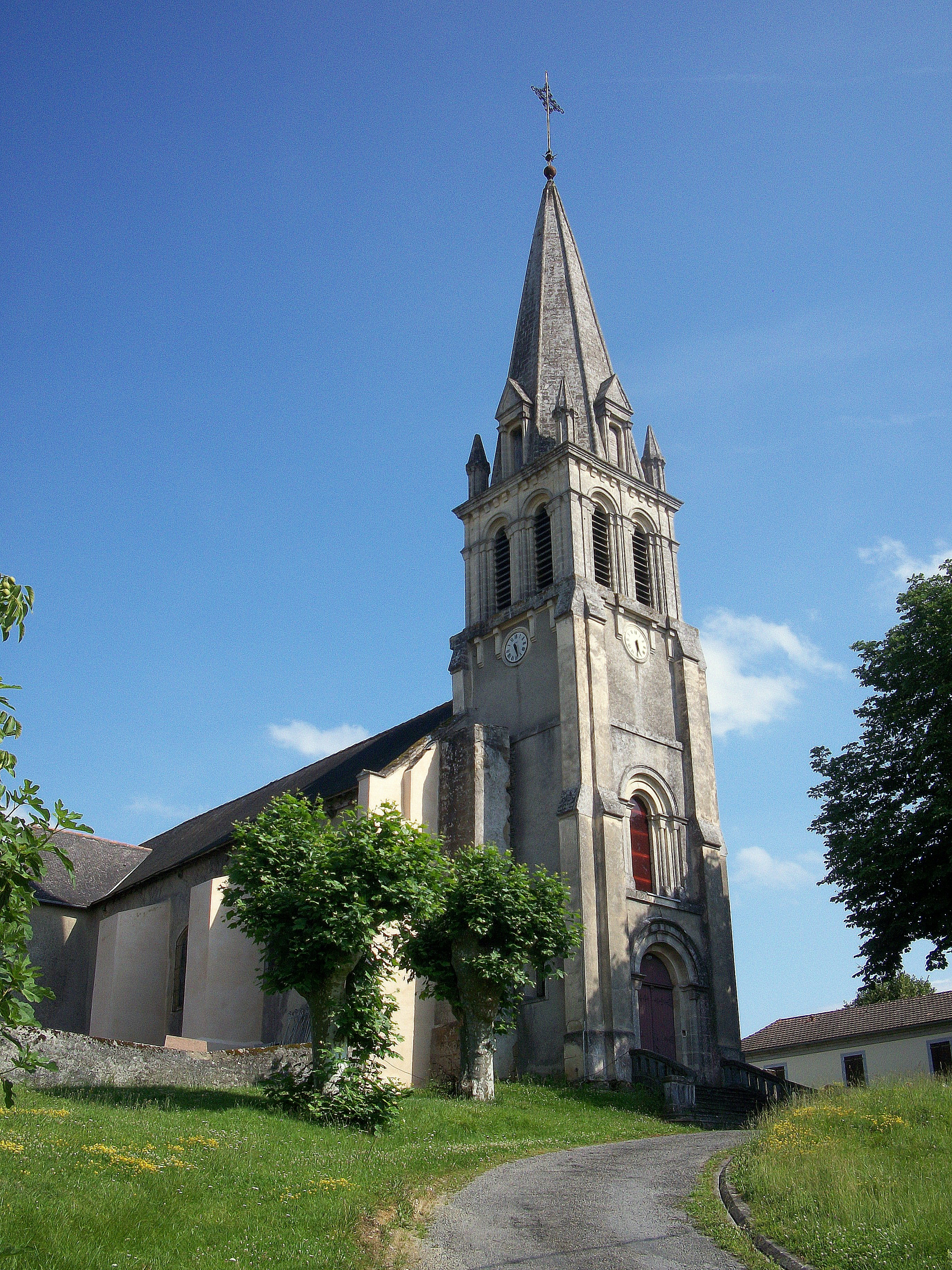
- The church of Orleix

- Coat of arms
- Location of Orleix
- Location within France Location within Occitanie
- Coordinates: 43°16′49″N 0°07′17″E
- Country: France
- Region: Occitania
- Department: Hautes-Pyrénées
- Arrondissement: Tarbes
- Canton: Bordères-sur-l'Échez
- Intercommunality: CA Tarbes-Lourdes-Pyrénées

Government
  - Mayor (2020–2026): Guillaume Rossic
- Area^{1}: 8.28 km^{2} (3.20 sq mi)
- Elevation: 260 m (850 ft)
- Highest elevation: 360 m (1,180 ft)
- Lowest elevation: 264 m (866 ft)
- Population (2023): 1,910
  - Density: 231/km^{2} (597/sq mi)
- Time zone: UTC+01:00 (CET)
  - Summer (DST): UTC+02:00 (CEST)
- INSEE/Postal code: 65340 /65800
- ^{1} French Land Register data, which excludes lakes, ponds, glaciers > 1 km^{2} (0.386 sq mi or 247 acres) and river estuaries.

Orleix (French pronunciation: [ɔʁlɛks]; Occitan: Orleish) is a commune in the Hautes-Pyrénées department in south-western France.

== Population ==
Historical population
Year	Pop.	±% p.a.
1968	668	—
1975	1,152	+8.10%
1982	1,253	+1.21%
1990	1,523	+2.47%
1999	1,671	+1.04%
2007	1,678	+0.05%
2012	1,967	+3.23%
2017	2,127	+1.58%
2023	1,910	−1.78%
Source: INSEE

== See also ==
- Communes of the Hautes-Pyrénées department
