= Cantons of the Hautes-Pyrénées department =

The following is a list of the 17 cantons of the Hautes-Pyrénées department, in France, following the French canton reorganisation which came into effect in March 2015:

- Aureilhan
- Bordères-sur-l'Échez
- Les Coteaux
- La Haute-Bigorre
- Lourdes-1
- Lourdes-2
- Moyen Adour
- Neste, Aure et Louron
- Ossun
- Tarbes-1
- Tarbes-2
- Tarbes-3
- Val d'Adour-Rustan-Madiranais
- La Vallée de l'Arros et des Baïses
- La Vallée de la Barousse
- La Vallée des Gaves
- Vic-en-Bigorre
