= Jeanine Dubié =

French politician

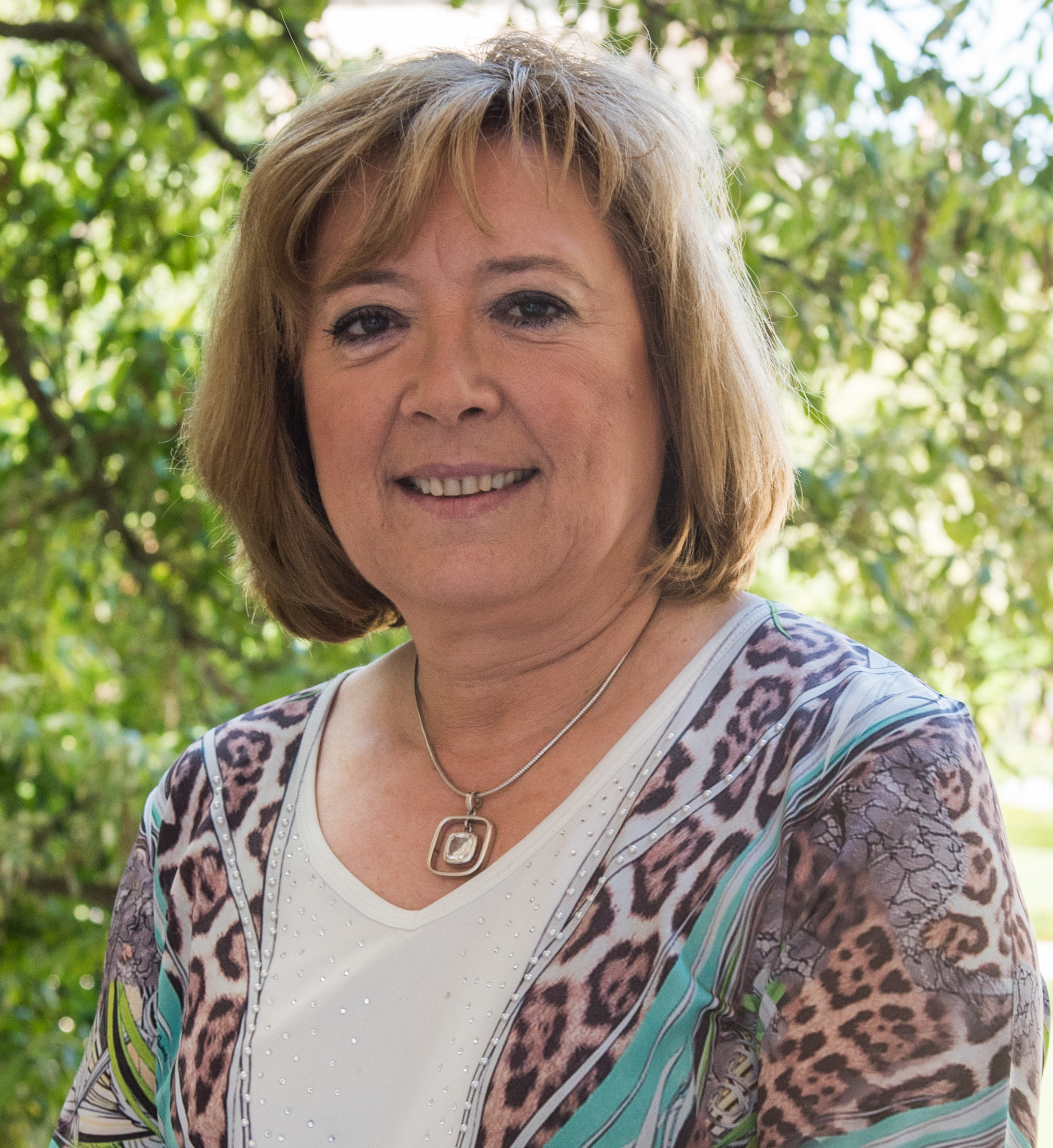

Member of the National Assembly for Hautes-Pyrénées's 2nd constituency
- In office 20 July 2012 – 22 June 2022
- Preceded by: Chantal Robin-Rodrigo
- Succeeded by: Benoit Mournet

Member of the Hautes-Pyrénées's Departmental council for Canton of Galan
- In office 21 March 2008 – 2 April 2015

Personal details
- Born: 3 January 1958 (age 68) Lourdes, France
- Party: PRG (until 2017); MRSL (2017-2019); PRG (since 2019)

Jeanine Dubié (born 3 January 1958 in Lourdes, Hautes-Pyrénées) is a politician, a former member of the National Assembly of France, where she represented the 2nd constituency of the Hautes-Pyrénées from 2012 to 2022.

== Early life and education ==
A social worker by profession, Jeanine Dubié worked in the Hospital Center of Lourdes before becoming a member of the Territorial Administration at the General Council of the Hautes-Pyrénées, in the field of assistance to municipalities, territorial policies, local development and the medico-social.

Office director of Jean-Michel Baylet, president of the general council of Tarn-et-Garonne, for two years, she then directed from 2002 to 2012, the retirement home "Accueil du Frère Jean" in Galan.

== Political career ==
=== Member of the Hautes-Pyrénées's Departmental council ===
Jeanine Dubié is listed under the PRG label in the 2008 French cantonal elections in the canton of Galan and leads in the first round with 46.59% of the votes and is elected with 72.59% of the votes in the second round. She chairs the Commission "Social Action, Inclusion, Politics of the City".

=== Member of the National Assembly ===
In the legislative elections of 2012, Jeanine Dubié was elected in the 2nd constituency of the Hautes-Pyrénées with 64.74% of the vote.

She was co-rapporteur of two parliamentary information reports, the first on the match between the supply and needs of vocational training and the second on the evaluation of the reception policy for asylum seekers in the first In 2015, she is co-rapporteur of a parliamentary report on the evaluation of the tourist reception policy and in 2016, on the evaluation of public support for hydrotherapy.

Candidate in the French legislative elections of 2017, she was reelected in the second round with 51% of the votes.

In the National Assembly, Jeanine Dubié sat on the Social Affairs Committee. She was also a Vice President of the Reception conditions for migrants's Working Group; and Vice President of the Hydrotherapy Working Group.

She did not stand for reelection in 2022.
