= Jean Glavany =

French politician (born 1949)

French Minister of Agriculture
- In office 1998–2002
- President: Jacques Chirac
- Prime Minister: Lionel Jospin
- Preceded by: Louis Le Pensec
- Succeeded by: François Patriat

Deputy for Hautes-Pyrénées's 3rd constituency in the National Assembly of France
- In office 1993–1997
- Preceded by: Claude Miqueu
- Succeeded by: Chantal Robin-Rodrigo
- In office 2002–2012
- Preceded by: Chantal Robin-Rodrigo
- Succeeded by: constituency abolished

Deputy for Hautes-Pyrénées's 1st constituency in the National Assembly of France
- In office 2012–2017
- Preceded by: Pierre Forgues
- Succeeded by: Jean-Bernard Sempastous

Personal details
- Born: 14 May 1949 (age 76) Sceaux, France
- Party: Socialist Party

Jean Glavany (born 14 May 1949 in Sceaux, Hauts-de-Seine) is a French politician of the Socialist Party (PS) and former Minister.

From 1981 to 1988, Glavany was head of cabinet of President François Mitterrand (PS). He was then Minister of Agriculture (1998–2002) in the Plural Left government of Lionel Jospin. Among other actions, he prohibited the Gaucho pesticide, alleged to be related to observations concerning the sudden decrease in bee population.

Glavany was elected deputy of Hautes-Pyrénées in 2002, and re-elected in 2007. He was part of the Socialiste, radical, citoyen et divers gauche parliamentary group in the National Assembly. Glavany is also president of the Community of Agglomeration of Tarbes.

Ahead of the Socialist Party's 2017 primaries, Glavany endorsed Manuel Valls as the party's candidate for the presidential election later that year.

== Political career ==
Governmental functions

Secretary of State for Technical Education : 1992–1993

Minister of Agriculture and Fisheries : 1998–2002

Electoral mandates

Member of the National Assembly of France for Hautes-Pyrénées : 1993–1998 (Became minister in 1998) / And since 2002

Mayor of Maubourguet : 1989–2001

Municipal councillor of Aureilhan, Hautes-Pyrénées : 2001–2008

Municipal councillor of Tarbes : Since 2008

President of the Agglomeration community of the Grand Tarbes : 2001–2008

Vice-president of the General council of Hautes-Pyrénées : 1992–2002

Regional councillor of Midi-Pyrénées : 1992–1993

== Sources ==
Political offices
Preceded by Louis Le Pensec	Minister of Agriculture; 1998–2002	Succeeded by François Patriat
