= Bazet =

- Commune
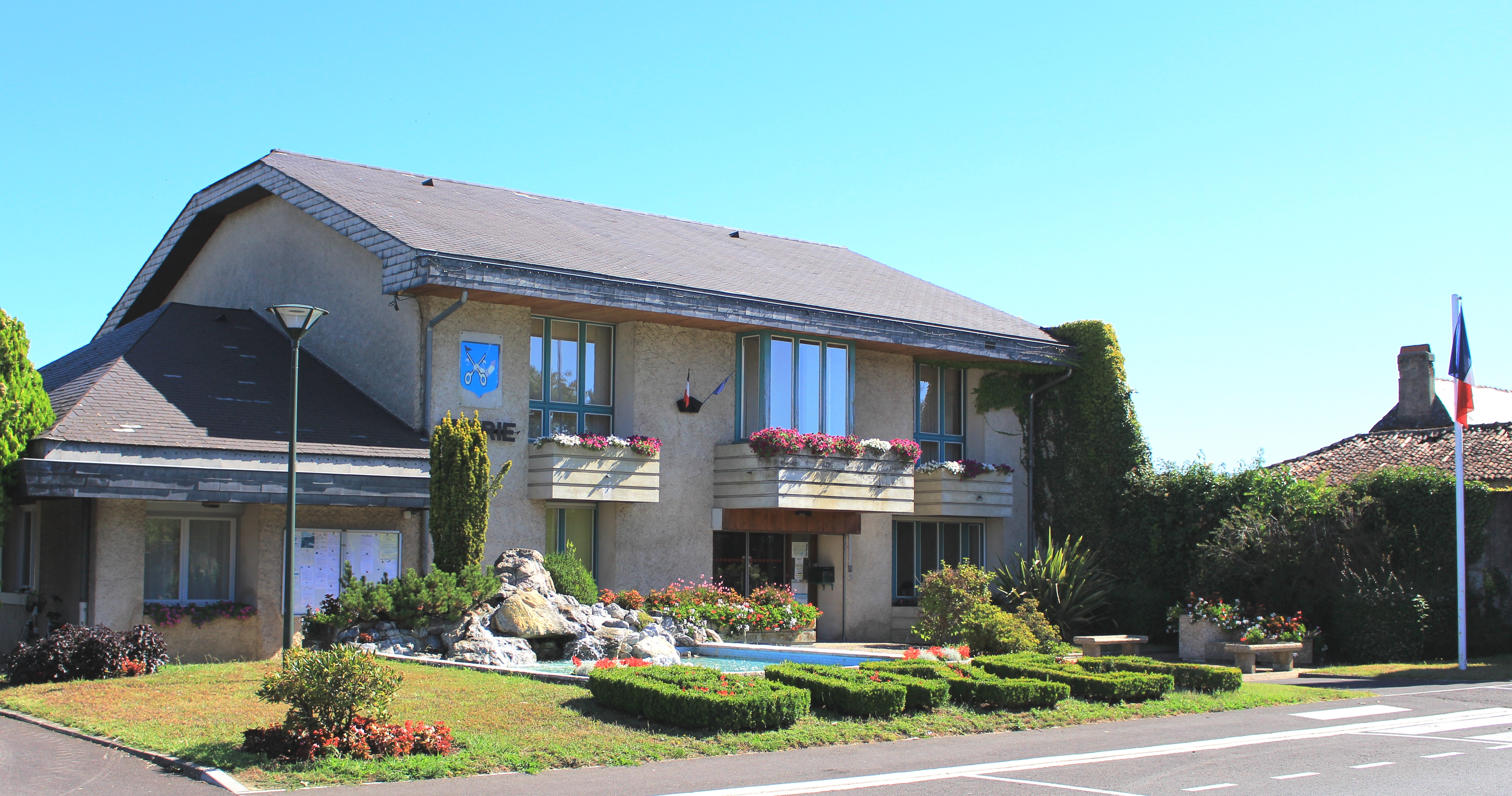
- The town hall in Bazet in 2019

- Coat of arms
- Location of Bazet
- Location within France Location within Occitanie
- Coordinates: 43°17′27″N 0°04′38″E
- Country: France
- Region: Occitania
- Department: Hautes-Pyrénées
- Arrondissement: Tarbes
- Canton: Bordères-sur-l'Échez
- Intercommunality: CA Tarbes-Lourdes-Pyrénées

Government
  - Mayor (2020–2026): Jean Buron
- Area^{1}: 2.84 km^{2} (1.10 sq mi)
- Elevation: 270 m (890 ft)
- Highest elevation: 276 m (906 ft)
- Lowest elevation: 264 m (866 ft)
- Population (2023): 1,858
  - Density: 654/km^{2} (1,690/sq mi)
- Time zone: UTC+01:00 (CET)
  - Summer (DST): UTC+02:00 (CEST)
- INSEE/Postal code: 65072 /65460
- ^{1} French Land Register data, which excludes lakes, ponds, glaciers > 1 km^{2} (0.386 sq mi or 247 acres) and river estuaries.

Bazet (French pronunciation: [bazɛ]; Occitan: Badèth) is a commune in the Hautes-Pyrénées department in southwestern France.

== Population ==
Historical population
Year	Pop.	±% p.a.
1968	878	—
1975	1,180	+4.31%
1982	1,516	+3.64%
1990	1,453	−0.53%
1999	1,298	−1.25%
2007	1,454	+1.43%
2012	1,646	+2.51%
2017	1,748	+1.21%
2023	1,858	+1.02%
Source: INSEE

== See also ==
- Communes of the Hautes-Pyrénées department
