= Lac Bleu d'Ilhéou =

Lake in France

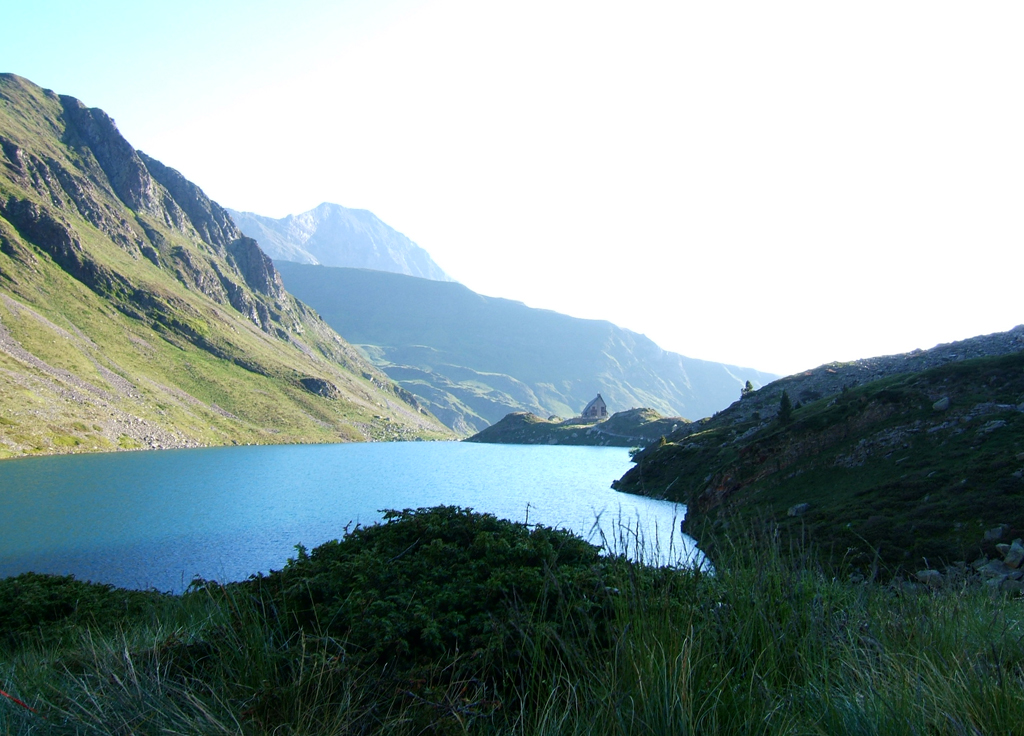

- Location within Pyrenees
- Location: Hautes-Pyrénées
- Coordinates: 42.863234°N 0.177374°W
- Primary outflows: Gave d'Ilhéou
- Basin countries: France
- Surface area: 0.113 km^{2} (0.044 sq mi)
- Max. depth: 20 m (66 ft)
- Surface elevation: 1,976 m (6,483 ft)

Lac Bleu d'Ilhéou is a lake in Hautes-Pyrénées, France. At an elevation of 1,976 m, its surface area is 0.113 km^{2}.
