= Cantons of Tarbes =

Coordinates: 43.23°N 0.08°E

The cantons of Tarbes are administrative divisions of the Hautes-Pyrénées department, in southwestern France. Since the French canton reorganisation which came into effect in March 2015, the city of Tarbes is subdivided into 3 cantons. Their seat is in Tarbes.

== Cantons ==
Name	Population (2019)	Cantonal Code
Canton of Tarbes-1	13,901	6510
Canton of Tarbes-2	14,145	6511
Canton of Tarbes-3	14,712	6512
