= Arrondissements of the Hautes-Pyrénées department =

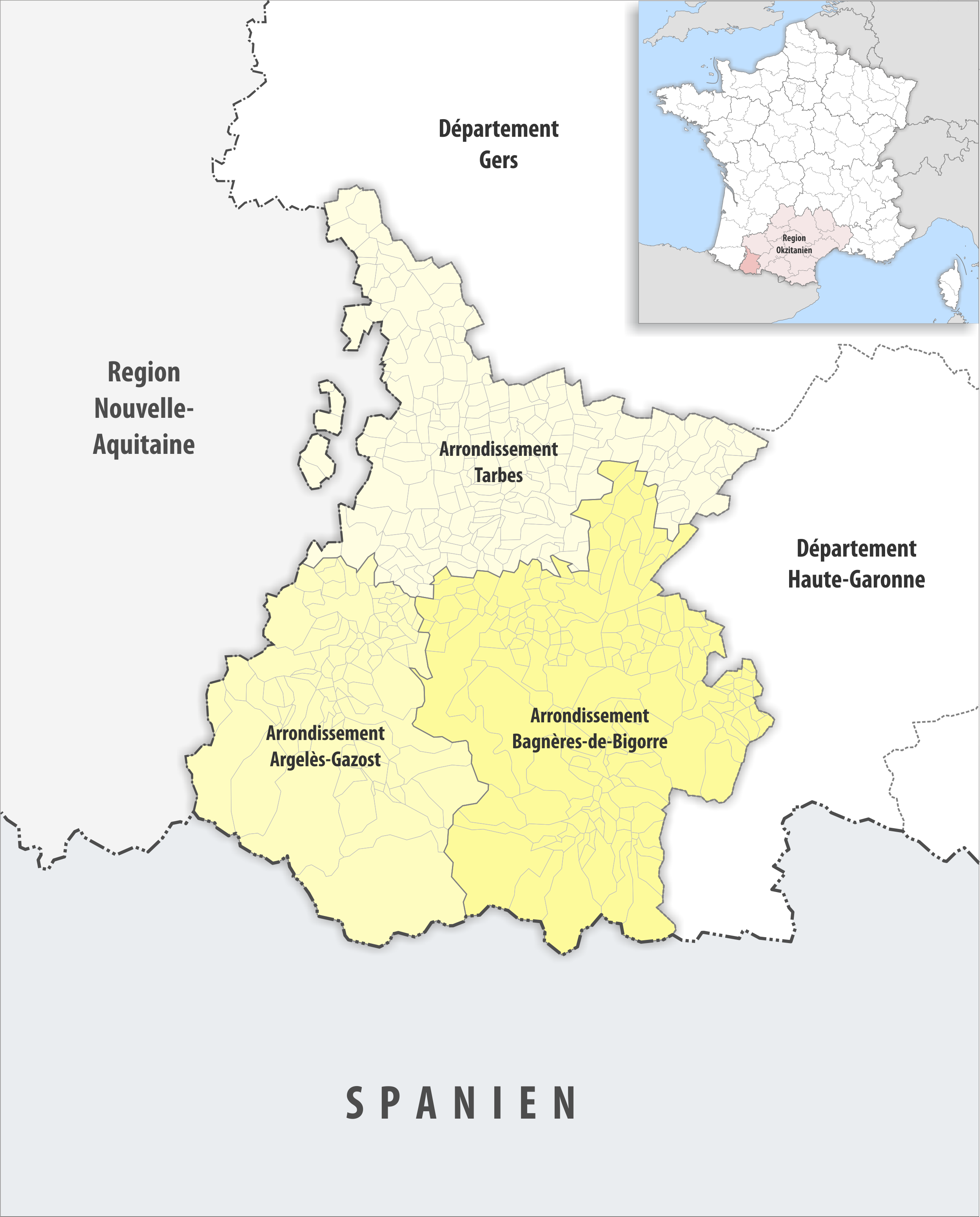
Map of arrondissements of the Hautes-Pyrénées department.

The 3 arrondissements of the Hautes-Pyrénées department are:

1. Arrondissement of Argelès-Gazost, (subprefecture: Argelès-Gazost) with 87 communes. The population of the arrondissement was 37,801 in 2021.
2. Arrondissement of Bagnères-de-Bigorre, (subprefecture: Bagnères-de-Bigorre) with 170 communes. The population of the arrondissement was 48,213 in 2021.
3. Arrondissement of Tarbes, (prefecture of the Hautes-Pyrénées department: Tarbes) with 212 communes. The population of the arrondissement was 144,942 in 2021.

== History ==
In 1800 the arrondissements of Tarbes, Argelès-Gazost and Bagnères-de-Bigorre were established. The arrondissement of Argelès-Gazost was disbanded in 1926, and restored in 1942. In January 2017 13 communes passed from the arrondissement of Tarbes to the arrondissement of Bagnères-de-Bigorre.
