= Sylvie Ferrer =

French politician

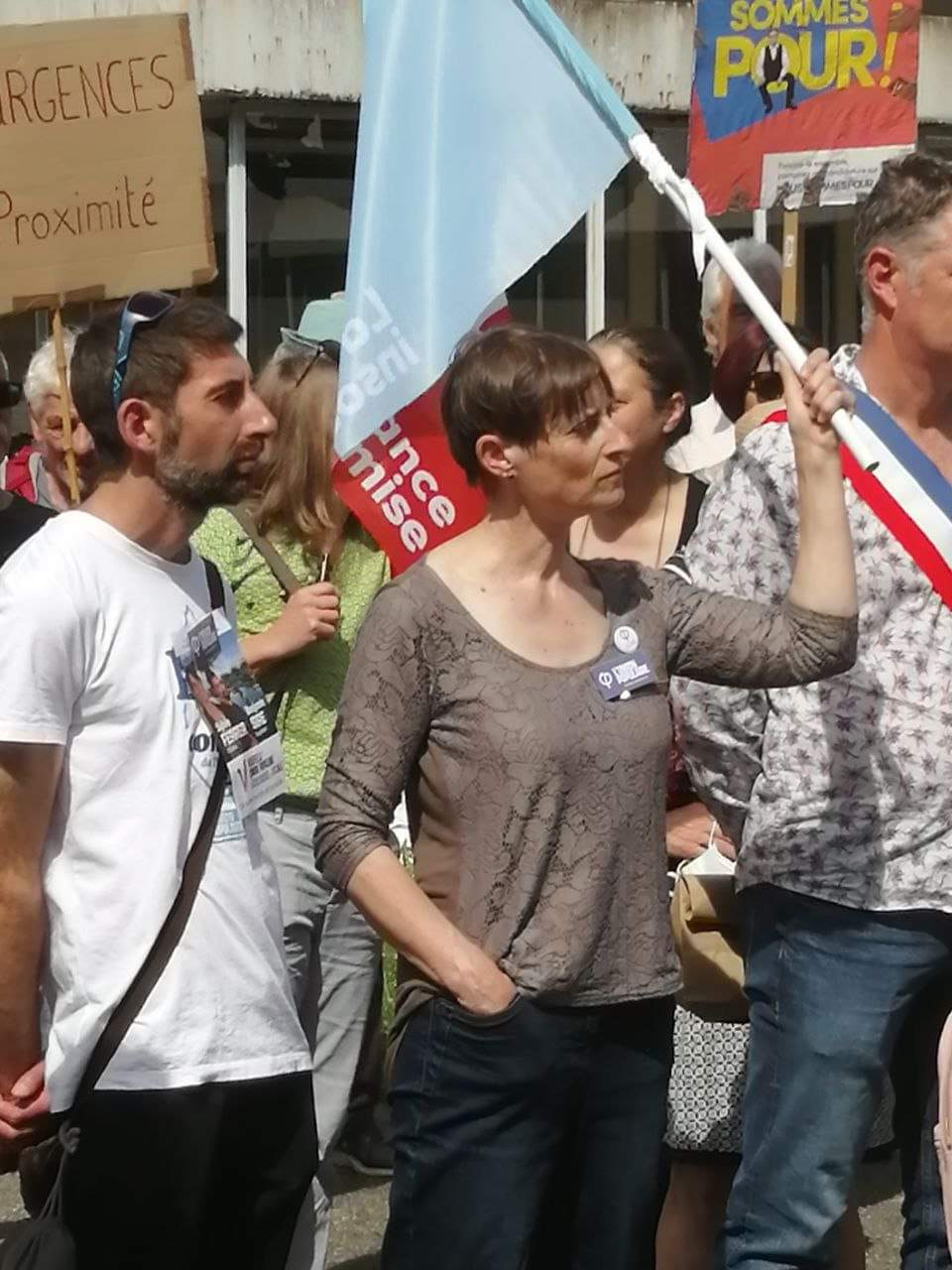

French MP
- Incumbent
- Assumed office June 22, 2022
- Preceded by: Jean-Bernard Sempastous
- Parliamentary group: LFI

Personal details
- Born: 6 November 1967 (age 58) Toulouse, France
- Party: LFI

Sylvie Ferrer (born November 6, 1967) is a French politician.

A member of La France insoumise, she was elected MP for the 1st constituency of Hautes-Pyrénées in 2022.

== Biography ==
=== Political career ===
An environmentalist and anti-globalization activist, she is a member of the Attac association and has led numerous struggles.

She was a candidate in the 2015 regional elections on the ecologist list led by Gérard Onesta, then joined La France insoumise in 2017.

As a candidate in the 2017 legislative elections in the first constituency of Hautes-Pyrénées, she qualified for the second round by eliminating former Socialist minister Jean Glavany. She was defeated in the second round by La République en marche candidate Jean-Bernard Sempastous.

In 2021, she is a candidate in the regional elections on the Occitanie populaire list, supported by La France insoumise in the Hautes-Pyrénées department. The same year, she was a deputy in the Hautes-Pyrénées departmental elections in the Haute-Bigorre canton.

Ferrer was subsequently appointed by Union Populaire activists to lead Jean-Luc Mélenchon's presidential campaign. On 7 May 2022, she was officially nominated as the candidate for the Nouvelle Union populaire écologique et sociale (NUPES) in the same constituency at a national convention.

On 12 June, in the first round of voting, she came out on top, beating the incumbent deputy from the presidential majority, Jean-Bernard Sempastous. Sylvie Ferrer was elected MP for Hautes-Pyrénées on June 19, 2022 with 50.13% of the vote.

At the French National Assembly, she is a member of the Sustainable Development and Spatial Planning Committee.

=== Personal life ===
Ferrer is an aeronautical maintenance agent. She has a husband, who works as a high school teacher, and a daughter.
