= Hautes-Pyrénées's 2nd constituency =

Constituency of the National Assembly of France

2nd constituency of the Hautes-Pyrénées
- inline Constituency of the National Assembly of France

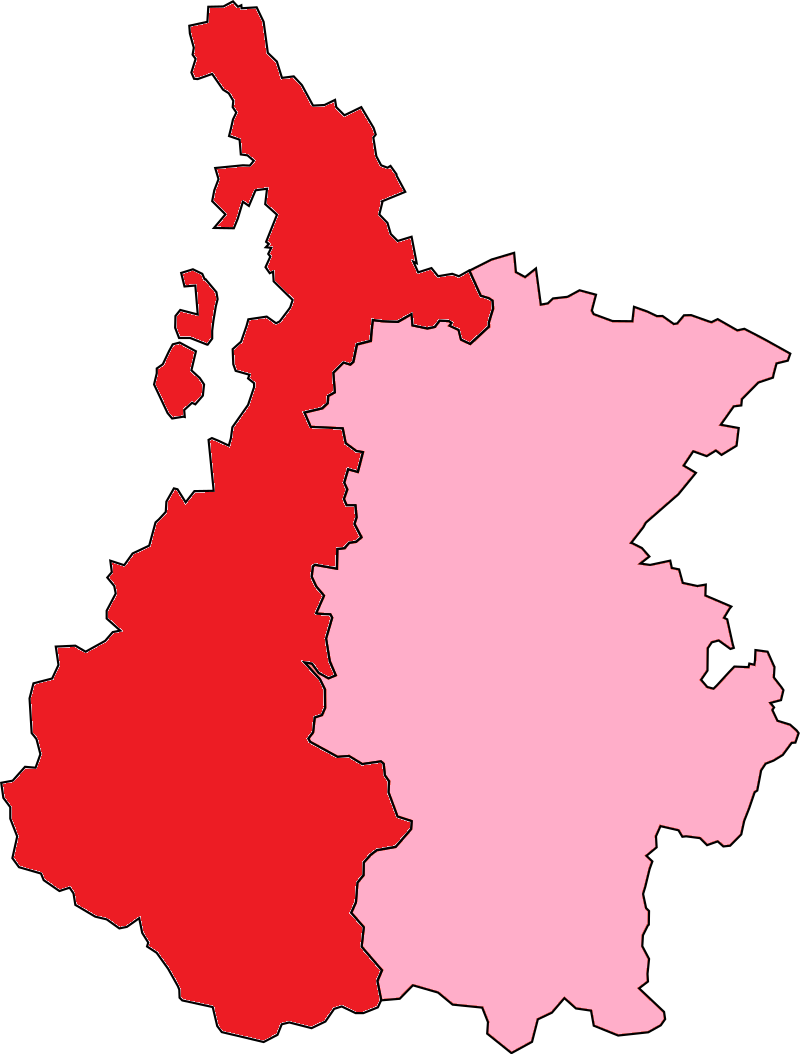
- Hautes-Pyrénées's 2nd Constituency shown within the Hautes-Pyrénées
- Deputy: Denis Fegne; Socialist
- Department: Hautes-Pyrénées
- Cantons: (pre-2015) Argelès-Gazost, Aucun, Bordères-sur-l'Echez, Castelnau-Rivière-Basse, Laloubère, Lourdes Est, Lourdes Ouest, Luz-Saint-Sauveur, Maubourguet, Ossun, Rabastens-de-Bigorre, Saint-Pé-de-Bigorre, Tarbes II, Tarbes V, Vic-en-Bigorre
- Registered voters: 89340

The 2nd constituency of the Hautes-Pyrénées (French: Deuxième circonscription des Hautes-Pyrénées) is a French legislative constituency in the Hautes-Pyrénées département. Like the other 576 French constituencies, it elects one MP using a two round electoral system.

== Description ==
The 2nd constituency of Hautes-Pyrénées covers the west of the department including part of Tarbes, the rest being in Hautes-Pyrénées's 1st constituency.

In recent decades the constituency has with the exception of between 1993 and 2002 been represented by a deputy from the PRG which generally supports the Socialist Party.

== Assembly Members ==
Election	Member	Party
1988	Claude Gaits	PRG
1993	Philippe Douste-Blazy	UDF
1997	Philippe Douste-Blazy	UDF
2002	Chantal Robin-Rodrigo	PRG
2007	Chantal Robin-Rodrigo	PRG
2012	Jeanine Dubié	PRG
2017	Jeanine Dubié	PRG
2022	Benoit Mournet	RE
2024	Denis Fegne	PS

== Election results ==
=== 2024 ===
Candidate	Party	Alliance	First round		Second round	
Candidate	Party	Alliance	Votes	%	Votes	%
Denis Fegne	PS	NPF	17,055	28.09	29,345	51.72
Olivier Monteil	RN		22,436	36.96	27,395	48.28
Benoit Mournet	REN	Ensemble	15,121	24.91		
Jacques Béhague	LR		3,184	5.24		
Jean-Marc Dabat	R!	Reg	1,486	2.45		
Claude Alves Da Cunha	R		735	1.21		
François Meunier	LO		692	1.14		
Ali El Marsni	Ind		0	0.00		
Valid votes			60,709	96.68	56,740	90.17
Blank votes			1,422	2.26	4,531	7.20
Null votes			662	1.05	1,655	2.63
Turnout			62,793	70.96	62,926	71.10
Abstentions			25,703	29.04	25,581	28.90
Registered voters			88,496		88,507	
Result			PS GAIN OVER REN			

=== 2022 ===
Legislative Election 2022: Hautes-Pyrénées's 2nd constituency
Party	Candidate	Votes	%	±%
LREM (Ensemble)	Benoit Mournet	10,870	23.75	-8.41
LFI (NUPÉS)	Grégory Korn	10,504	22.95	+1.68
RN	Serge Dumanoir	8,483	18.54	+7.45
PRG	Jérome Crampe	6,555	14.32	−2.21
LR (UDC)	Véronique Dutrey	2,770	6.05	−8.11
R!	Jean-Marc Dabat	1,974	4.31	N/A
REC	Claude Alves Da Cunha	1,667	3.64	N/A
Others	N/A	2,944	6.43	
Turnout		45,767	52.39	−0.55
2nd round result
LREM (Ensemble)	Benoit Mournet	21,073	52.27	+3.90
LFI (NUPÉS)	Grégory Korn	19,239	47.73	N/A
Turnout		40,312	50.57	+4.27
LREM gain from PRG				

=== 2017 ===
Results of the 11 June and 18 June 2017 French National Assembly election in Hautes-Pyrénées’ 2nd Constituency
Candidate	Party		1st round		2nd round	
Candidate	Party		Votes	%	Votes	%
Marie-Agnès Staricky	La République En Marche!	LREM	14,813	32.16	17,455	48.91
Jeanine Dubié	Radical Party of the Left	PRG	7,615	16.53	18,230	51.09
Clément Menet	The Republicans	LR	6,523	14.16		
Charles Rocheteau	La France Insoumise	FI	6,413	13.92		
Olivier Monteil	National Front	FN	5,106	11.09		
Marie-Pierre Vieu	Communist Party	PCF	2,215	4.81		
Cécile Bourdeu D’Aguerre	Ecologist	ECO	1,171	2.54		
Pauline Bach-Lapize	Debout la France	DLF	714	1.55		
Sabrina Verdier	Independent	DIV	493	1.07		
François Meunier	Far Left	EXG	383	0.83		
Albert Danjau	Ecologist	ECO	381	0.83		
Nathalie Volpe Fatmi	Independent	DIV	231	0.50		
Total			46,058	100%	35,685	100%
Registered voters			89,343		89,340	
Blank/Void ballots			1,240	2.62%	5,275	12.87%
Turnout			47,298	52.94%	40,960	45.85%
Abstentions			42,045	47.06%	48,380	54.15%
Result					PRG HOLD	

=== 2012 ===
Results of the 10 June and 17 June 2012 French National Assembly election in Hautes-Pyrénées’ Constituency
Candidate	Party		1st round		2nd round	
Candidate	Party		Votes	%	Votes	%
Jeanine Dubié	Radical Party of the Left	PRG	22,732	42.63	32,403	64.74
Jean-Pierre Artiganave	Union for a Popular Movement	UMP	25.73	13,720	17,648	35.26
Marie-Pierre Vieu	Left Front	FG	6,735	12.63		
Philippe Manusset	National Front	FN	5,659	10.61		
Marie-Laure Bondon	Europe Ecology - The Greens	EELV	1,426	2.67		
Jean-Pierre Auguet	The Centre for France	CEN	1,309	2.45		
Albert Danjau	Ecologist	ECO	467	0.88		
Christian Zueras	Far Left	EXG	421	0.79		
François Meunier	Far Left	EXG	302	0.57		
Andrée Chenauad	Miscellaneous Right	DVD	300	0.56		
Marie-Claude Bosc	Miscellaneous Right	DVD	258	0.48		
Total			53,329	100%	50,051	100%
Registered voters			88,978		88,975	
Blank/Void ballots			1,098	2.02%	2,363	4.51%
Turnout			54,427	61.17%	52,414	58.91%
Abstentions			34,551	38.83%	36,561	41.09%
Result					PRG HOLD	

=== 2007 ===
Results of the 10 June and 17 June 2007 French National Assembly election in Hautes-Pyrénées’ 2nd Constituency
Candidate	Party		1st round		2nd round	
Candidate	Party		Votes	%	Votes	%
Chantal Robin-Rodrigo	Radical Party of the Left	PRG	16,356	39.78	23,075	55.17
Gérard Tremege	Union for a Popular Movement	UMP	15,688	38.16	18,754	44.83
Jean Casteran	UDF-Democratic Movement	UDF-MoDem	3,620	8.81		
Carole Barbe	Communist Party	PCF	1,252	3.05		
Christian Zueras	Far Left	EXG	1,120	2.72		
Nicole Laborde	National Front	FN	1,105	2.69		
Michèle Gaspalou	The Greens	LV	717	1.74		
Albert Danjau	Ecologist	ECO	544	1.32		
François Meunier	Far Left	EXG	280	0.68		
Robert Romanelli	Independent	DIV	261	0.63		
Dominique Fevre	Far Right	EXD	170	0.41		
Brahim El Batbouti	Miscellaneous Left	DVG	0	0.00		
Total			41,113	100%	41,829	100%
Registered voters			63,116		63,204	
Blank/Void ballots			846	2.02%	1,290	2.99%
Turnout			41,959	66.48%	43,119	68.22%
Abstentions			21,157	33.52%	20,085	31.78%
Result					PRG HOLD	

=== 2002 ===
Results of the 9 June and 16 June 2002 French National Assembly election in Hautes-Pyrénée’s 2nd Constituency
Candidate	Party		1st round		2nd round	
Candidate	Party		Votes	%	Votes	%
Gerard Tremege	Union for a Presidential Majority	UMP	16,277	39.75	19,370	48.49
Chantal Robin-Rodrigo	Radical Party of the Left	PRG	15,250	37.24	20,578	51.51
Pierre Rey	National Front	FN	2,952	7.21		
Elisabeth Carrere	Communist Party	PCF	1,586	3.87		
Micheline Dallier	Hunting, Fishing, Nature and Traditions	CPNT	1,453	3.55		
Christian Agius	The Greens	LV	1,172	2.86		
Christian Zueras	Revolutionary Communist League	LCR	810	1.98		
François Meunier	Workers’ Struggle	LO	456	1.11		
Albert Danjau	Ecologist	ECO	309	0.75		
Michel Aguillon	Independent	DIV	288	0.70		
Ingrid Wuster	National Republican Movement	MNR	167	0.41		
Emmanuel Hornus	Ecologist	ECO	160	0.39		
Lionel Cazeaux	Independent	DIV	66	0.16		
Total			40,946	100%	39,948	100%
Registered voters			60,061		60,054	
Blank/Void ballots			1,136	2.70%	1,632	3.92%
Turnout			42,082	70.07%	41,580	69.24%
Abstentions			17,979	29.93%	18,474	30.76%
Result					PRG GAIN FROM UDF	
