= Échez =

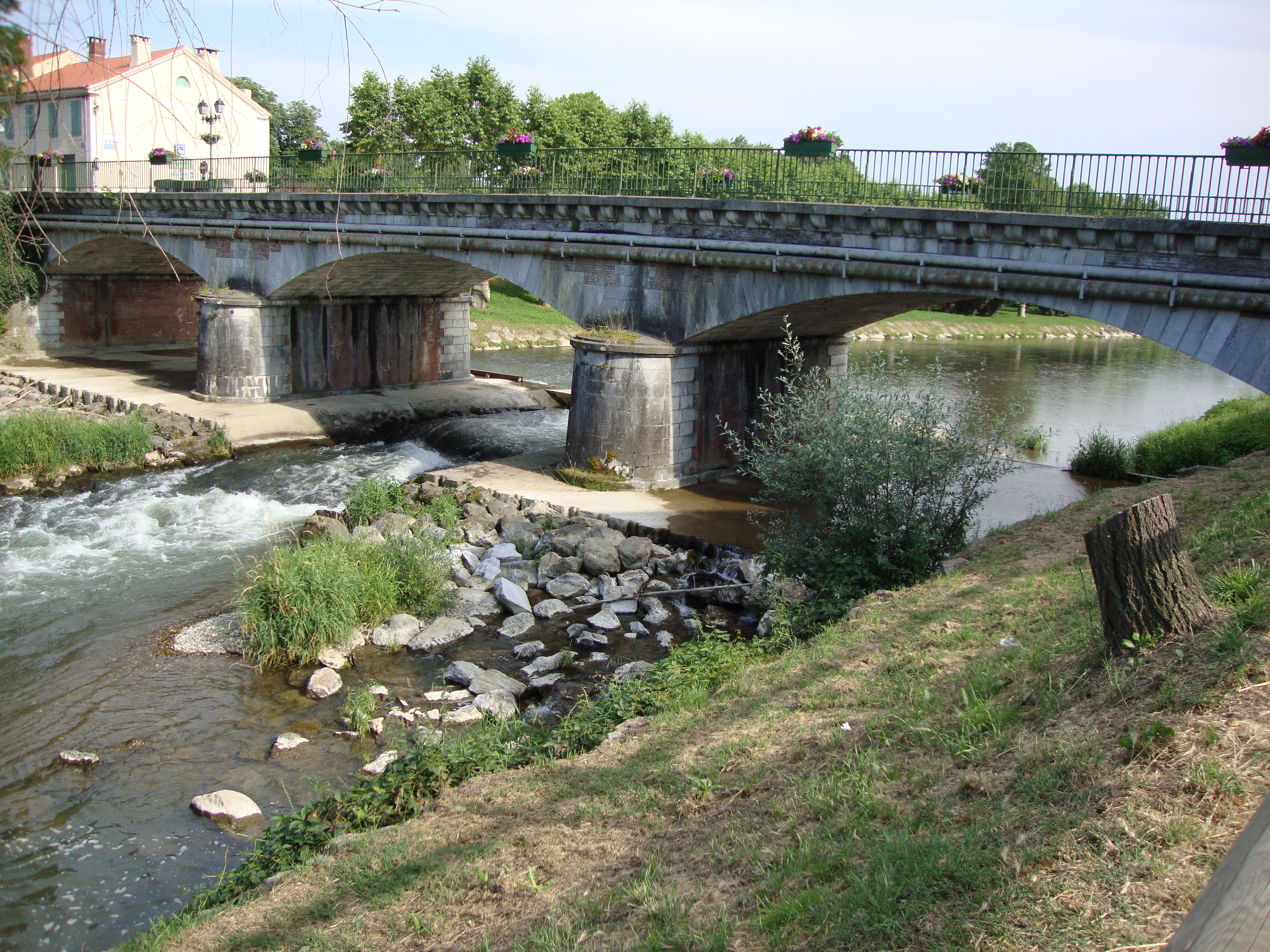

- Location within France Location within Occitanie

Location
- Country: France

Physical characteristics
- Source
  - location: Hautes-Pyrénées
- Mouth
  - location: Adour
  - coordinates: 43°28′25″N 0°1′53″E
- Length: 64 km (40 mi)
- Basin size: 168 km^{2} (65 sq mi)
- Discharge
  - average: 3 m^{3}/s (110 cu ft/s)

Basin features
- Progression: Adour→ Atlantic Ocean

The Échez (French pronunciation: [eʃɛs]; Occitan: Eishés) is a left tributary of the Adour, in the Hautes-Pyrénées, in the Southwest of France. It is 64.2 km (39.9 mi) long.

== Geography ==
The Échez rises in Sère-Lanso (east of Lourdes) and flows north along the Adour, which it joins in Maubourguet. It flows through Tarbes and Vic-en-Bigorre.

== Main tributaries ==
- (R) Aube,
- (L) Jeune,
- (R) Gespe, in Tarbes,
- (L) Souy,
- (L) Géline, from the plateau of Ger
- (L) Lis, from Ger.
