= Bours, Hautes-Pyrénées =

Bours
- Commune
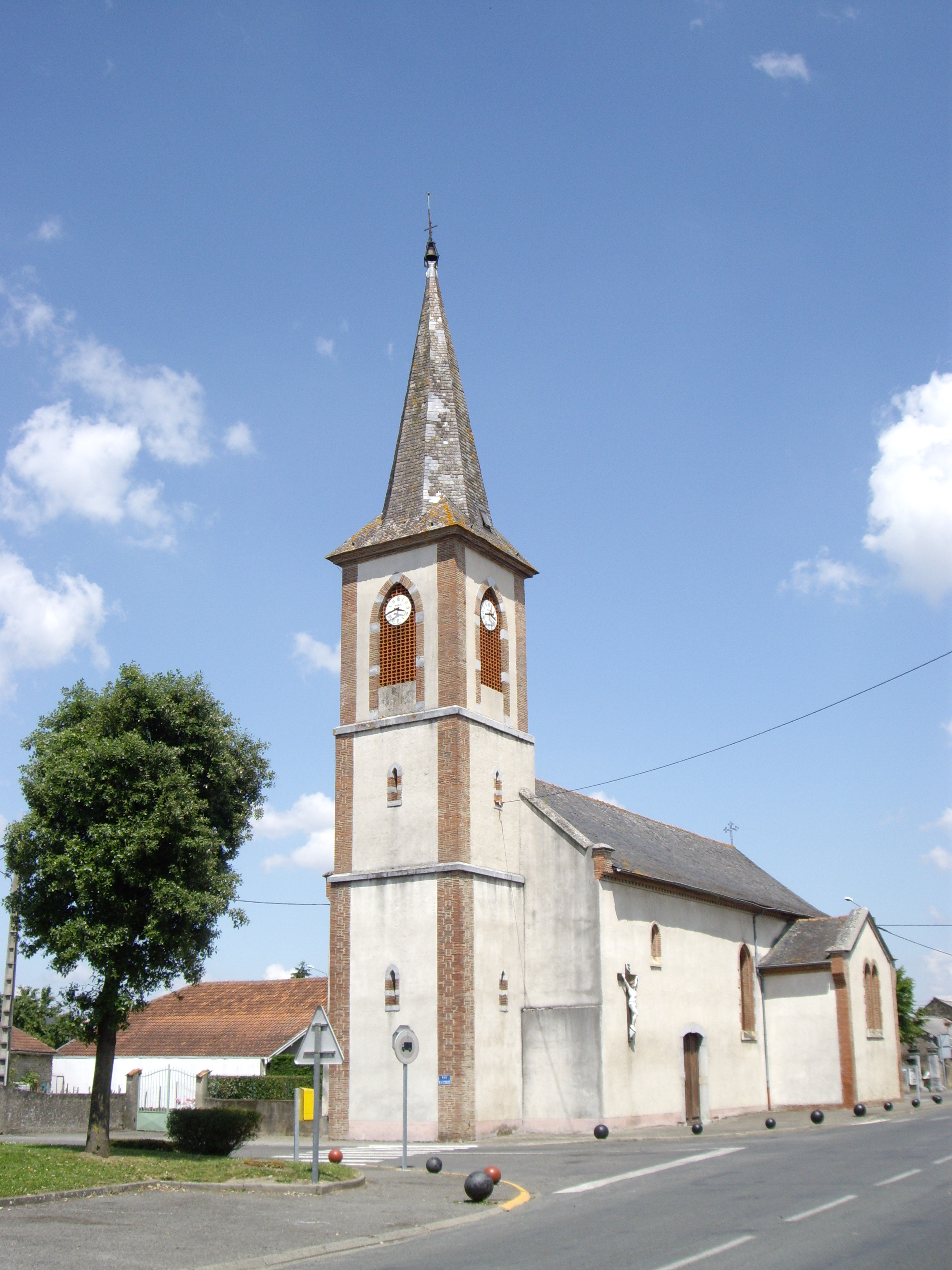
- Church of the Assumption

- Coat of arms
- Location of Bours
- Location within France Location within Occitanie
- Coordinates: 43°16′39″N 0°05′39″E
- Country: France
- Region: Occitania
- Department: Hautes-Pyrénées
- Arrondissement: Tarbes
- Canton: Bordères-sur-l'Échez
- Intercommunality: CA Tarbes-Lourdes-Pyrénées

Government
  - Mayor (2024–2026): Julien Nigon
- Area^{1}: 4.68 km^{2} (1.81 sq mi)
- Elevation: 300 m (980 ft)
- Highest elevation: 290 m (950 ft)
- Lowest elevation: 267 m (876 ft)
- Population (2023): 882
  - Density: 188/km^{2} (488/sq mi)
- Time zone: UTC+01:00 (CET)
  - Summer (DST): UTC+02:00 (CEST)
- INSEE/Postal code: 65108 /65460
- ^{1} French Land Register data, which excludes lakes, ponds, glaciers > 1 km^{2} (0.386 sq mi or 247 acres) and river estuaries.

Bours (French pronunciation: [buʁ]; Occitan: Borç) is a commune in the Hautes-Pyrénées department in southwestern France.

== Population ==
Historical population
Year	Pop.	±% p.a.
1968	371	—
1975	524	+5.06%
1982	547	+0.62%
1990	602	+1.20%
1999	715	+1.93%
2007	729	+0.24%
2012	782	+1.41%
2017	829	+1.17%
2023	882	+1.04%
Source: INSEE

== See also ==
- Communes of the Hautes-Pyrénées department
