= Ibos, Hautes-Pyrénées =

Ibos
- Commune
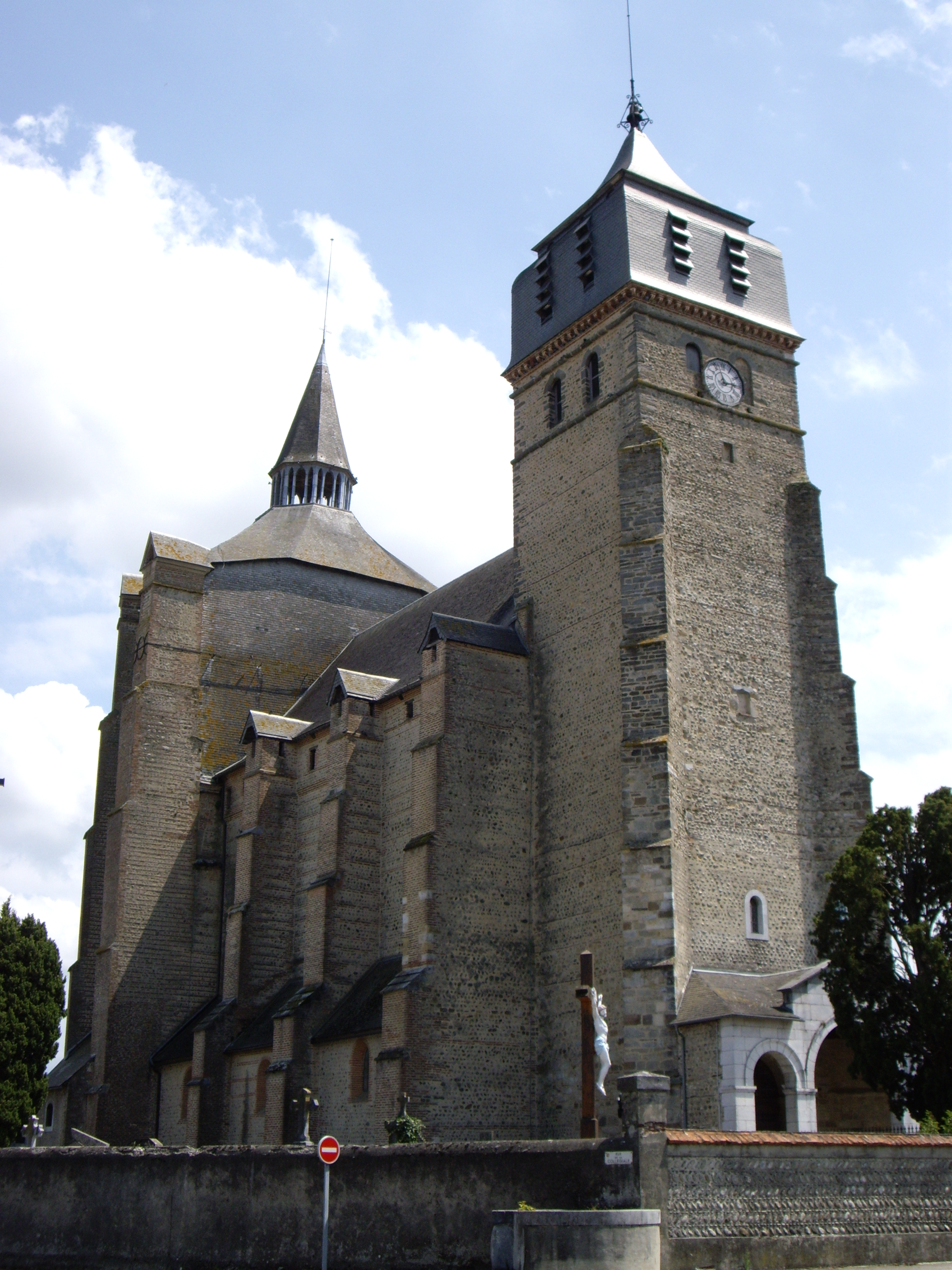
- The Saint-Laurent Collegiate Church

- Coat of arms
- Location of Ibos
- Location within France Location within Occitanie
- Coordinates: 43°14′03″N 0°00′09″E
- Country: France
- Region: Occitania
- Department: Hautes-Pyrénées
- Arrondissement: Tarbes
- Canton: Bordères-sur-l'Échez
- Intercommunality: Tarbes-Lourdes-Pyrénées

Government
  - Mayor (2020–2026): Denis Fégné
- Area^{1}: 32.88 km^{2} (12.70 sq mi)
- Elevation: 321 m (1,053 ft)
- Highest elevation: 432 m (1,417 ft)
- Lowest elevation: 293 m (961 ft)
- Population (2023): 2,813
  - Density: 85.55/km^{2} (221.6/sq mi)
- Time zone: UTC+01:00 (CET)
  - Summer (DST): UTC+02:00 (CEST)
- INSEE/Postal code: 65226 /65420
- ^{1} French Land Register data, which excludes lakes, ponds, glaciers > 1 km^{2} (0.386 sq mi or 247 acres) and river estuaries.

Ibos (French pronunciation: [ibɔs]; Occitan: Ibòs) is a commune in the Hautes-Pyrénées department in south-western France.

== Population ==
Historical population
Year	Pop.	±% p.a.
1968	1,837	—
1975	1,987	+1.13%
1982	2,238	+1.71%
1990	2,309	+0.39%
1999	2,778	+2.08%
2007	2,718	−0.27%
2012	2,778	+0.44%
2017	2,895	+0.83%
2023	2,813	−0.48%
Source: INSEE

== See also ==
- Communes of the Hautes-Pyrénées department
