= Denis Fegne =

French politician

Denis Fégné

Member of the National Assembly for Hautes-Pyrénées's 2nd constituency
- Incumbent
- Assumed office 8 July 2024
- Preceded by: Benoit Mournet

Personal details
- Born: 31 July 1960 (age 65) Castelsarrasin, France
- Party: Socialist

Denis Fégné (born 31 July 1960) is a French politician who is a member of the Socialist Party. In the 2024 French legislative election, he was elected deputy for Hautes-Pyrénées's 2nd constituency.

== Biography ==
Denis Fégné was elected municipal councilor of Ibos, in the Hautes-Pyrénées in 2008, and became mayor of the commune on 16 March 2013. He was re-elected in 2014 and 2020.

Denis Fégné was also elected vice-president in charge of finance for Le Grand Tarbes in 2014 and then for the Tarbes-Lourdes-Pyrénées urban community in 2017.

He also held the position of President of the Hautes-Pyrénées Territorial Public Service Management Centre since 2014.

He was Viviane Artigalas's substitute in the 2017 senatorial elections in the Hautes-Pyrénées, as well as in those of 2023.

He was a candidate of the Socialist Party invested by the New Popular Front in the Hautes-Pyrénées's 2nd constituency for the early legislative elections of 2024, he was elected in the second round with 51.72% of the votes against the candidate of the National Rally Olivier Monteil, and thus succeeded Benoit Mournet of the presidential party.

He is part of the socialist and affiliated group in the National Assembly and sits on the Sustainable Development, Spatial and Regional Planning Committee.

He is also president of the study group on thermalism.

== Election results ==
=== Legislative elections ===
Year	Party	Constituency	1st ^{round}			2nd ^{round}		
Year	Party	Constituency	Voice	%	Rank	Voice	%	Issue
2024	PS	Hautes-Pyrénées's 2nd constituency	17,055	28.09	2nd	29,345	51.72	Elected

== See also ==
- List of deputies of the 17th National Assembly of France
