= Canton of Bordères-sur-l'Échez =

Coordinates: 43.26°N 0.05°E

The canton of Bordères-sur-l'Échez is an administrative division of the Hautes-Pyrénées department, southwestern France. Its borders were modified at the French canton reorganisation which came into effect in March 2015. Its seat is in Bordères-sur-l'Échez.

It consists of the following communes:

1. Bazet
2. Bordères-sur-l'Échez
3. Bours
4. Chis
5. Ibos
6. Orleix
7. Oursbelille
