= Michèle Artigue =

French mathematician

Michèle Artigue (born 1946) is a French expert in mathematics education, a professor emeritus at Paris Diderot University and the former president of the International Commission on Mathematical Instruction.

== Early life and education ==
Artigue was born in 1946 in Bordères-sur-l'Échez, a small town in the Pyrenees. She was the daughter of a kindergarten teacher, and writes that she was "always interested in mathematics". She attended the lycée in Tarbes, the nearest town large enough for that level of school, and then spent two years in a preparatory mathematics course for entrance to the grandes écoles in Toulouse, where her sister worked as a teacher.

She became a student at the Ecole Normale Supérieure in 1965. Her instructors included Gustave Choquet, Henri Cartan, and Laurent Schwartz. After her son was born in 1967, her mother came to live with her in Paris to help take care of him. At approximately the same time, she became interested in model theory through a book by Georg Kreisel and Jean-Louis Krivine. She took part in a student protest in 1968, part of the May 1968 events in France, in which most of the students refused to take the oral part of the agrégation exam, but their resistance to the exam did not last and she completed her agrégation in 1969.

Following this she became a student at the University of Paris, studying mathematical logic, and when it split into multiple universities in 1970 she chose to go to Paris Diderot University. She completed her doctorate there in 1972.

== Career ==
While still a doctoral student, Artigue became a faculty member at what would become Paris Diderot University in 1969. In part as fallout from the student protests, in the same year, the Institute of Research in Mathematics Education (IREM) was founded at the university, with André Revuz as its director, and Revuz invited Artigue to become one of its members. Through her involvement with the institute, her interests shifted from logic to mathematics education.

Artigue directed IREM from 1985 to 1988. She then moved to the University Institute for Teacher Education of the University of Reims Champagne-Ardenne, where she took a full professorship and became head of the mathematics department. She returned to Paris Diderot University and to the directorship of IREM in 1999, and retired as an emeritus professor in 2010.

She also served as president of the International Commission on Mathematical Instruction from 2007 to 2010.

== Research ==
Artigue's early work in mathematics education focused on derivatives and integrals and on the graphical representation of functions. Later, she became interested in educational technology and its integration into the teaching of mathematics. Her research also included work on pedagogical theory.

== Recognition ==
Artigue was an invited speaker at the International Congress of Mathematicians twice, in 1998 and 2006.

In 2012, her collaborators organized a conference in her honor in Paris, and a festschrift from the conference, The Didactics of Mathematics: Approaches and Issues: A Homage to Michèle Artigue, was published in 2016.

Artigue won the Félix Klein medal of the International Commission on Mathematical Instruction in 2013. In 2015, the Inter-American Committee on Mathematics Education gave her their Luis Santaló Medal. She became a Knight of the Legion of Honour in 2015.
