= Jean-Bernard Sempastous =

French politician

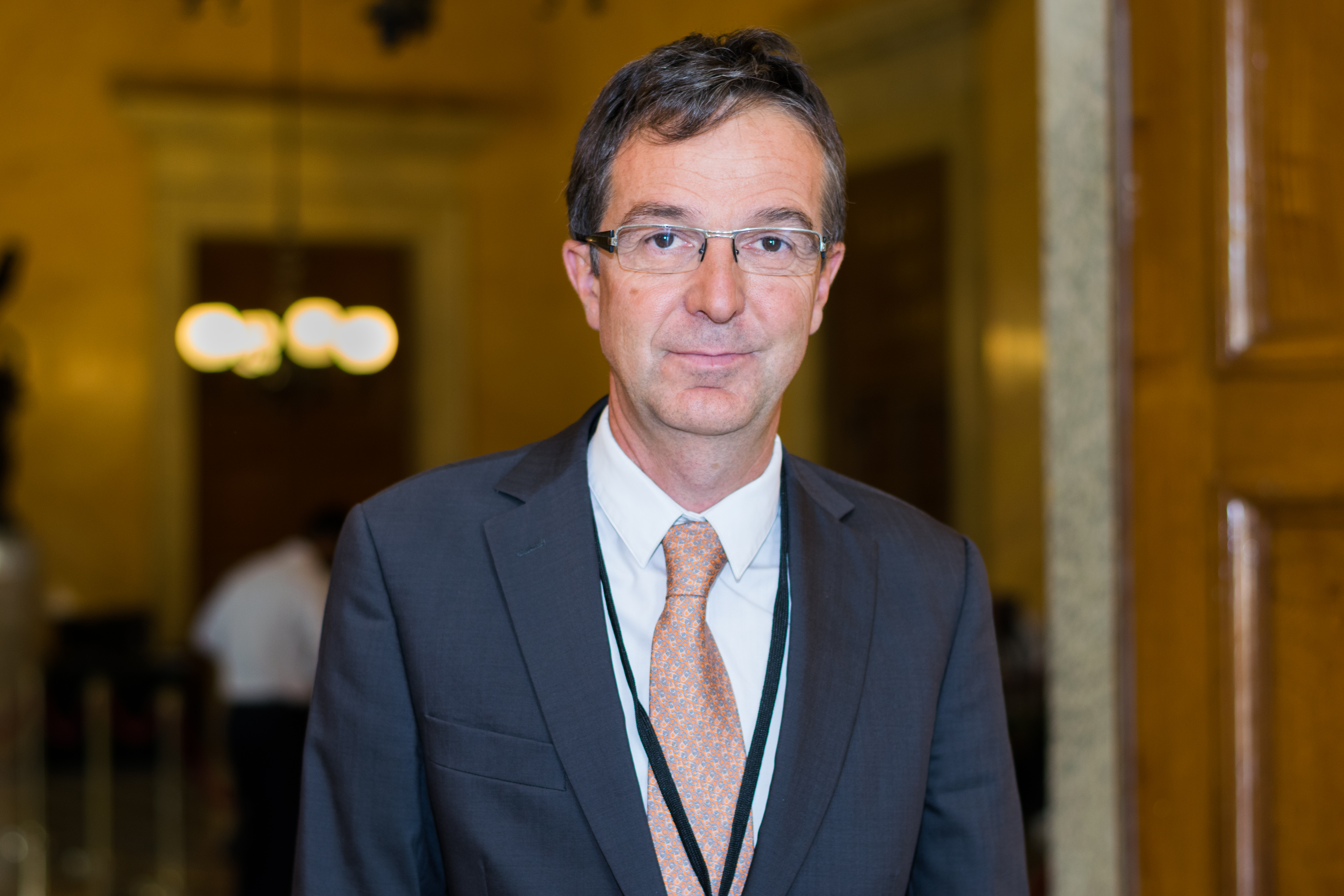

Member of the French National Assembly for Hautes-Pyrénées's 1st constituency
- In office 21 June 2017 – 21 June 2022
- Preceded by: Jean Glavany
- Succeeded by: Sylvie Ferrer

Personal details
- Born: 5 August 1964 (age 61) Bagnères-de-Bigorre, France
- Party: En Marche!

Jean-Bernard Sempastous (born 5 August 1964) is a French politician of La République En Marche! (LREM) who was deputy for Hautes-Pyrénées's 1st constituency in the French National Assembly from 2017 to 2022.

In parliament, Sempastous served as member of the Committee on Economic Affairs. In addition to his committee assignments, he was part of the parliamentary friendship groups with Pakistan and Spain as well as of the French delegation to the Inter-Parliamentary Union (IPU).

At the initiative of Sempastous and Benoît Simian, some twenty LREM deputies who had been elected in rural areas established their interest group within the party's parliamentary group in September 2018.

== See also ==
- 2017 French legislative election
