= Pierre Forgues =

French politician (born 1938)

Pierre Forgues (born 17 June 1938 in Tarbes) is a member of the National Assembly of France. He represents the Hautes-Pyrénées department, and is a member of the Socialiste, radical, citoyen et divers gauche.
