= Benoit Mournet =

French politician (born 1986)

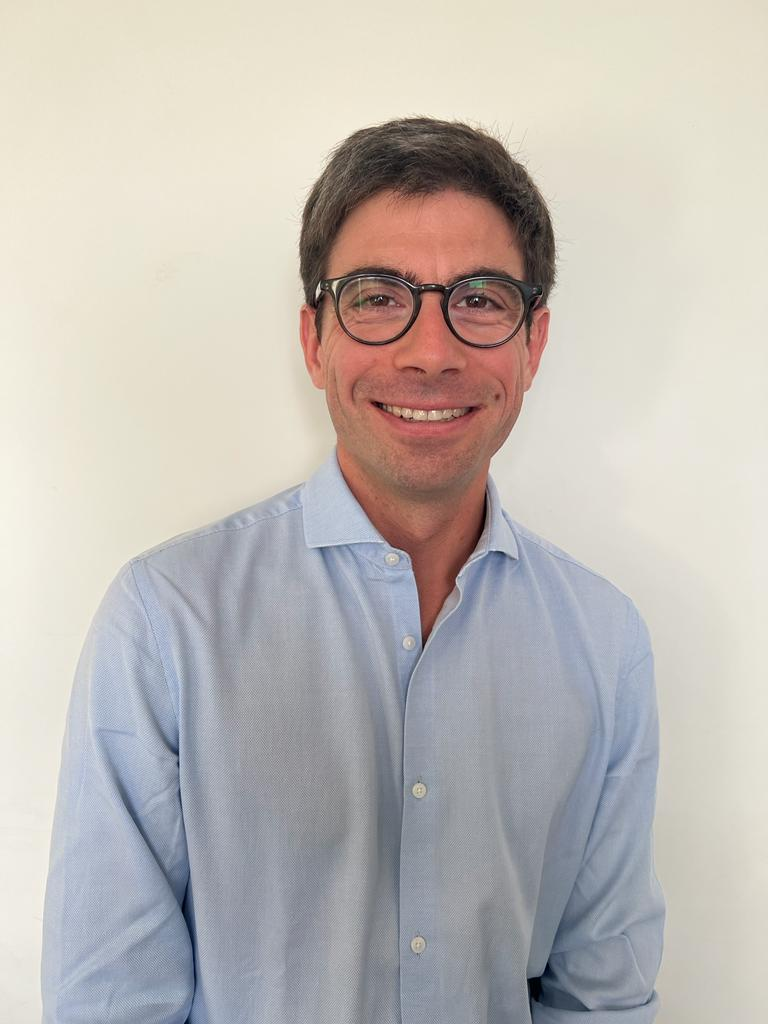
- Mournet in 2022

Member of the French National Assembly for Hautes-Pyrénées's 2nd constituency
- In office 22 June 2022 – 9 June 2024
- Preceded by: Jeanine Dubié
- Succeeded by: Denis Fégné

Personal details
- Born: 16 January 1986 (age 40)
- Party: Renaissance

Benoit Mournet (born 16 January 1986) is a French politician. From 2022 to 2024, he was a member of the National Assembly. From 2020 to 2022, he served as subprefect of Provence-Alpes-Côte d'Azur.
