= Hautes-Pyrénées =

Department of France in Occitanie

Hautes-Pyrénées Hauts Pirenèus (Occitan) Altos Pirineos (Spanish) Alts Pirineus (Catalan)
- Department of France
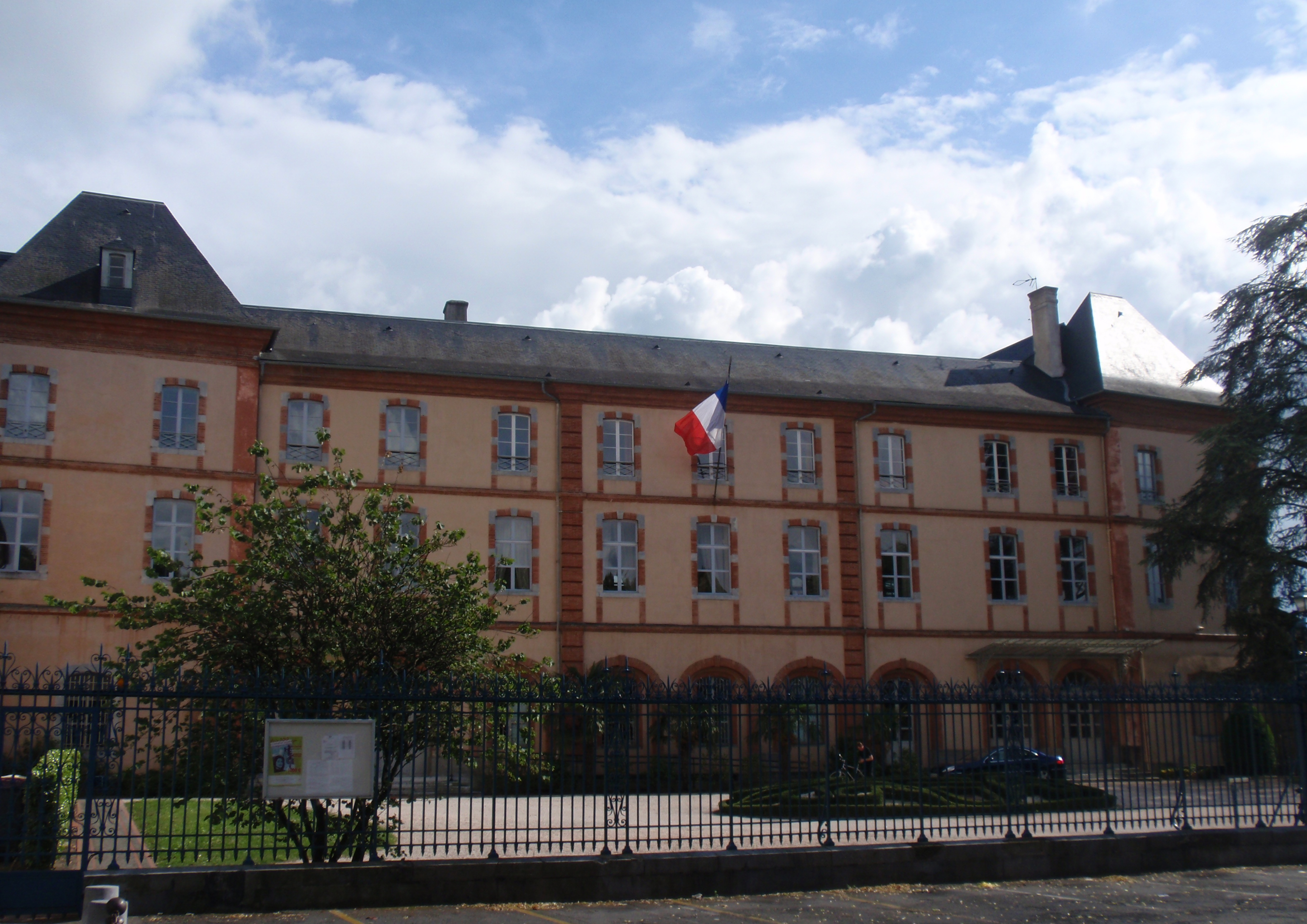
- Prefecture building in Tarbes

- Coat of arms

- Location of Hautes-Pyrénées in France
- Coordinates: 43°14′0″N 0°4′5″E
- Country: France
- Region: Occitania
- Prefecture: Tarbes
- Subprefectures: Argelès-Gazost; Bagnères-de-Bigorre

Government
  - President of the Departmental Council: Michel Pélieu (PRG)

Area^{1}
  - Total: 4,464 km^{2} (1,724 sq mi)

Population (2023)
  - Total: 231,349
  - Rank: 86th
  - Density: 51.83/km^{2} (134.2/sq mi)
- Time zone: UTC+1 (CET)
  - Summer (DST): UTC+2 (CEST)
- ISO 3166 code: FR-65
- Department number: 65
- Arrondissements: 3
- Cantons: 17
- Communes: 469
- ^1 French Land Register data, which exclude estuaries and lakes, ponds and glaciers larger than 1 km^{2}

Hautes-Pyrénées (French pronunciation: [ot piʁene]; Gascon/Occitan: Nauts Pirenèus / Hauts Pirenèus ['awts piɾeˈnɛʊs]; Spanish: Altos Pirineos; Catalan: Alts Pirineus ['alts piɾiˈneʊs]) is a department in the region of Occitania, southwestern France. The department is bordered by Pyrénées-Atlantiques to the west, Gers to the north, Haute-Garonne to the east, as well by the Spanish province of Huesca in the autonomous community of Aragon to the south. In 2023, its population was 231,349; its prefecture is Tarbes. It is named after the Pyrenees mountain range.

== History ==
Historically the area broadly covered by the département was known as Bigorre, a territory at times independent but also at times part of Gascony province. Large parts of the area were held by the English after the Treaty of Brétigny, 1360. In the 16th century, it was part of the Huguenot domain of the monarchs of Navarre, brought to France by Henri IV. For its early history, see Bigorre and Gascony.

The département of Hautes-Pyrénées was created at the time of the French Revolution, on 4 March 1790, through the influence of French politician Bertrand Barère, a member of the Convention.

== Geography ==
Map of the Hautes-Pyrénées

Hautes-Pyrénées consists of several distinct geographical areas. The southern portion, along the border with Spain, consists of mountains such as the Vignemale, the Pic du Midi de Bigorre, and the Neouvielle and Arbizon ranges. A second area consists of low-altitude rolling hills. The northern part of the département consists of largely flat agricultural land. Hautes-Pyrénées has two small territorial exclaves—a remnant from the Middle Ages—located within the neighboring département of Pyrénées-Atlantiques. The southern part of the department is sparsely populated and typically have higher elevations while the northern part of the department is highly urbanised and typically have lower elevations than the southern part.

=== Principal towns ===
The greater Tarbes area is the economic and administrative focus of the département, while Lourdes, the second-biggest city in Hautes-Pyrénées, is dedicated almost exclusively to the religious pilgrimage industry. As of 2023, there are 7 communes with more than 5,000 inhabitants:

Commune	Population (2023)
Tarbes	44,399
Lourdes	13,266
Aureilhan	8,031
Bagnères-de-Bigorre	7,114
Lannemezan	5,811
Bordères-sur-l'Échez	5,399
Séméac	5,236

== Demographics ==
Population development since 1801:

Historical population

Year	Pop.	±% p.a.
1801	174,721	—
1806	198,763	+2.61%
1821	212,077	+0.43%
1831	233,031	+0.95%
1841	244,196	+0.47%
1851	251,285	+0.29%
1861	240,179	−0.45%
1872	235,156	−0.19%
1881	236,472	+0.06%
1891	225,861	−0.46%
1901	215,546	−0.47%
1911	206,105	−0.45%
1921	185,760	−1.03%
1931	189,993	+0.23%

Year	Pop.	±% p.a.
1936	188,604	−0.15%
1946	201,954	+0.69%
1954	203,544	+0.10%
1962	211,433	+0.48%
1968	225,730	+1.10%
1975	227,222	+0.09%
1982	227,922	+0.04%
1990	224,759	−0.17%
1999	222,368	−0.12%
2007	228,594	+0.35%
2012	228,854	+0.02%
2017	228,530	−0.03%
2023	231,349	+0.20%

== Politics ==
The president of the Departmental Council is Michel Pélieu, first elected in 2011.

=== Current National Assembly Representatives ===
Constituency	Member	Party
Hautes-Pyrénées's 1st constituency	Sylvie Ferrer	La France Insoumise
Hautes-Pyrénées's 2nd constituency	Denis Fegne	Socialist Party

== Tourism ==
The Western Pyrenees National Park covers a significant area, and includes well-known attractions such as the Cirque de Gavarnie and the Pont d'Espagne. The entire area is a favorite destination of hikers and mountain enthusiasts.

The area has been known, perhaps since Antiquity, for its hot springs, and several towns were built around these, most notably Cauterets, Luz-Saint-Sauveur and Bagnères-de-Bigorre.

A notable lake in the area is Lac Bleu d'Ilhéou, southwest of Cauterets.

There are a number of notable ski resorts in Hautes-Pyrénées such as Barèges-La Mongie, Gavarnie, Luz-Ardiden, Cauterets, Hautacam, Piau-Engaly and Saint-Lary-Soulan.

The area is a nearly-permanent fixture on the Tour de France's itinerary, with significantly difficult passes such as the Tourmalet, the Aubisque and the Soulor.

A jazz festival is held each year in Luz-Saint-Sauveur: Jazz a Luz. Tarbes hosts an annual horse festival, Equestria, and a Tango festival, Tarbes en Tango.

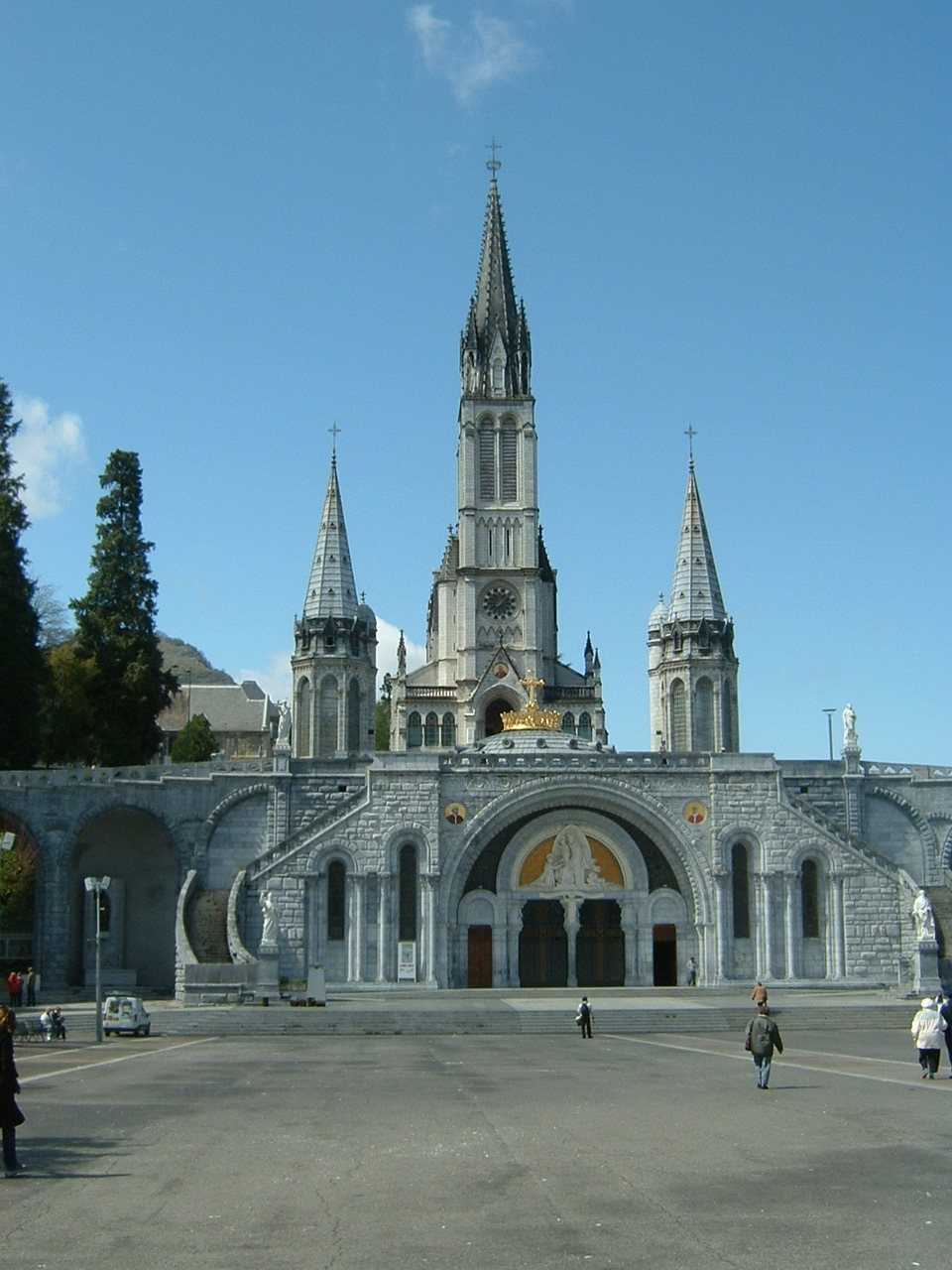
Lourdes sanctuary

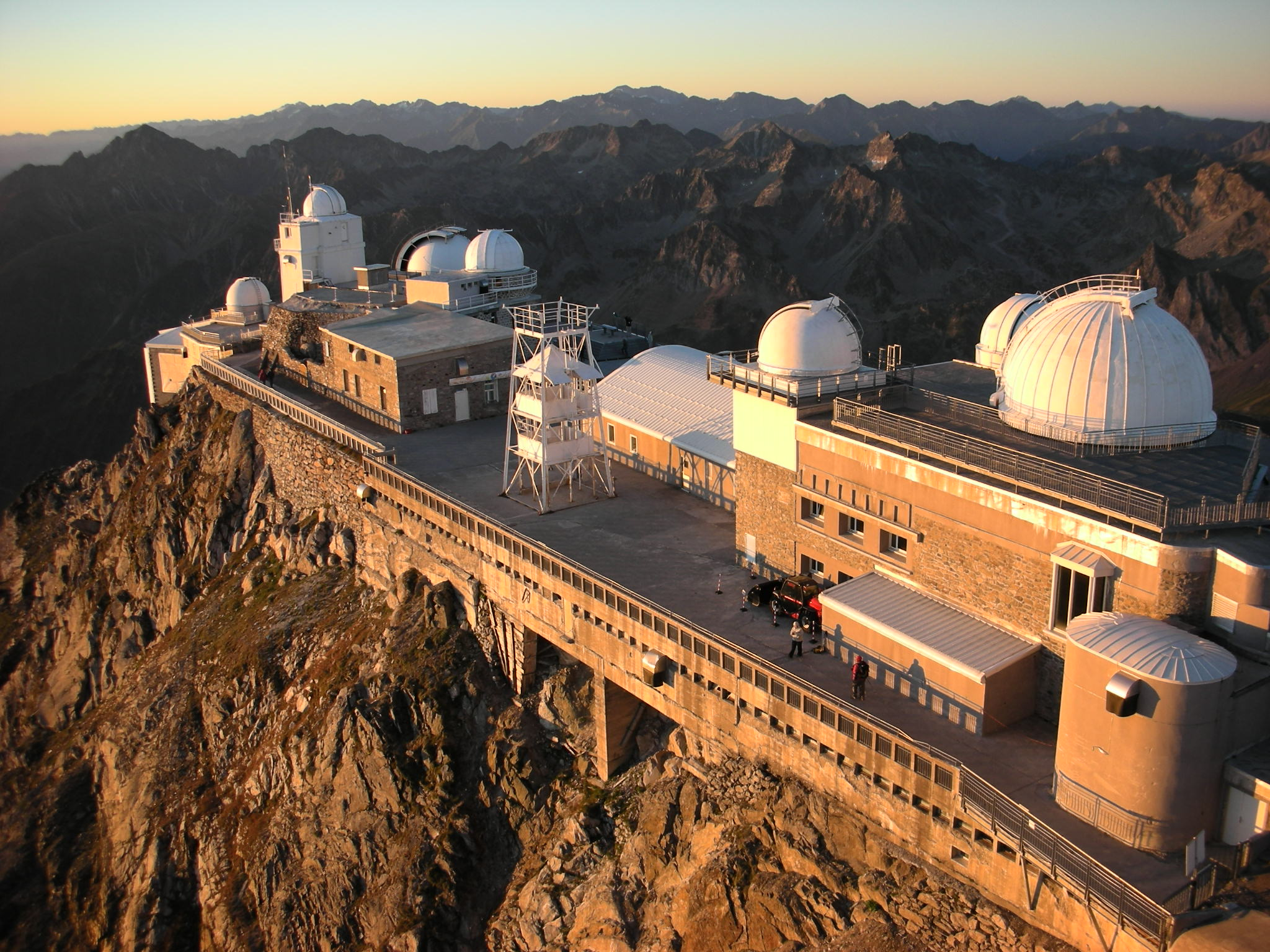
Pic du Midi de Bigorre

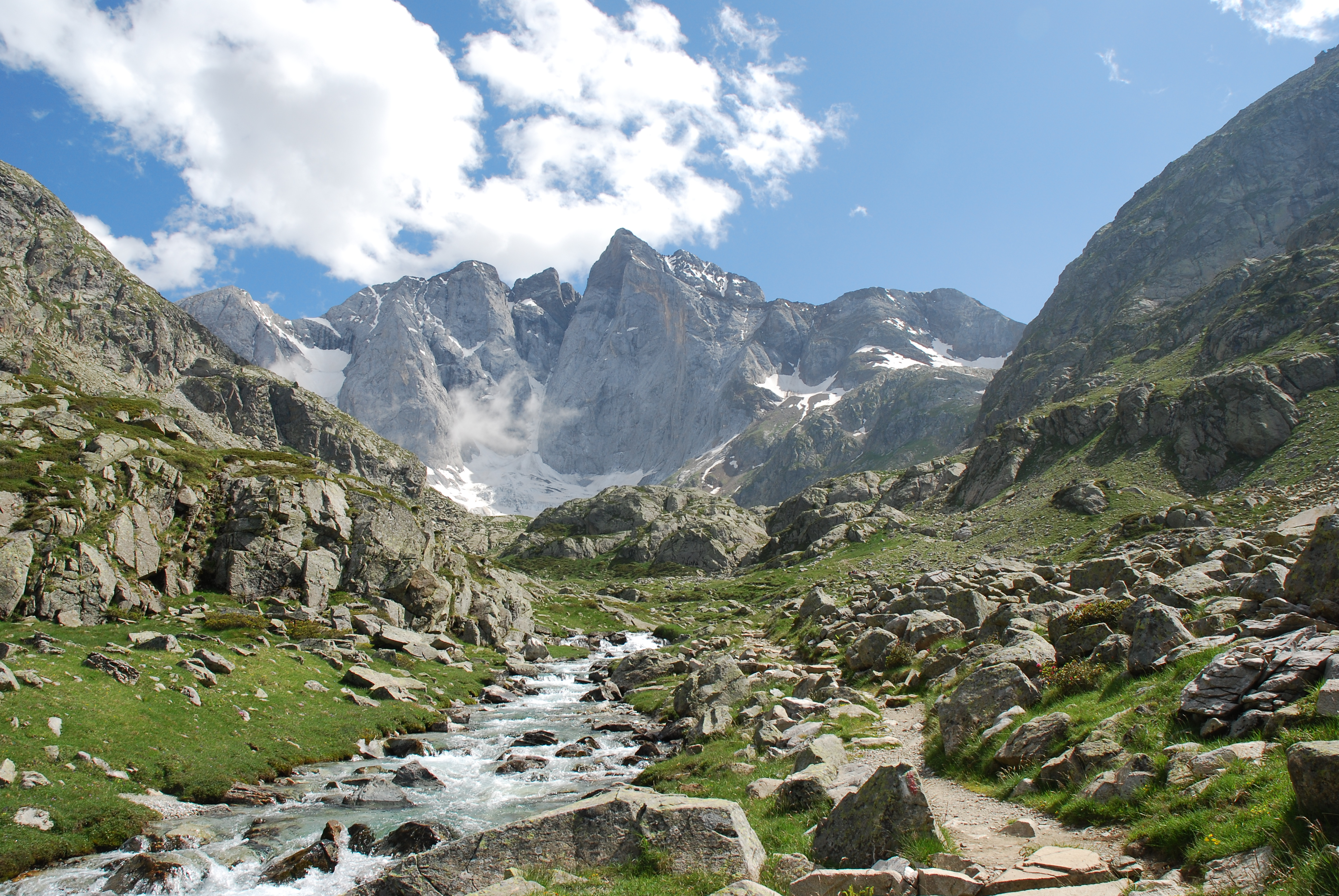
Vignemale

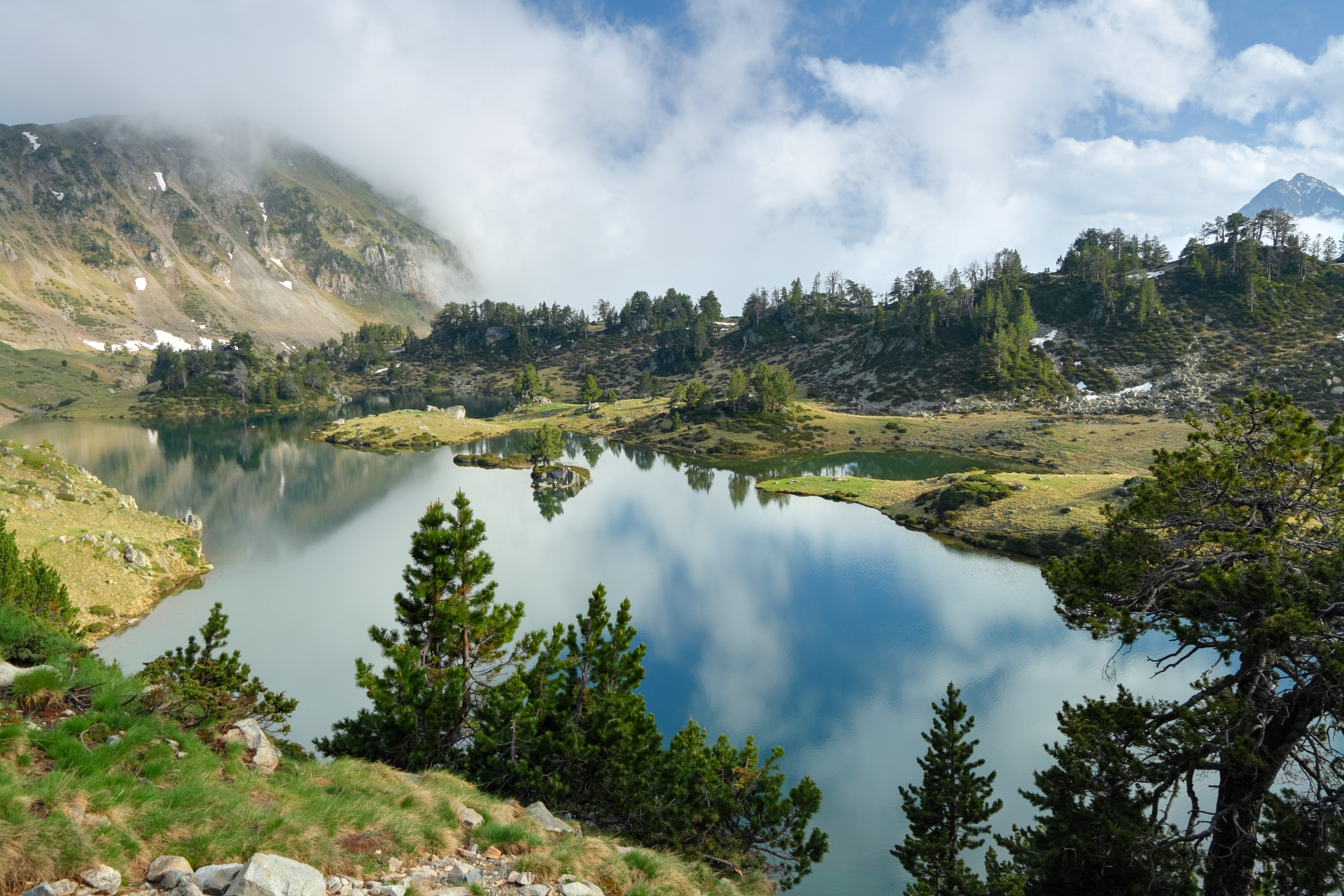
Middle of Lake Bastan, shortly before sunset

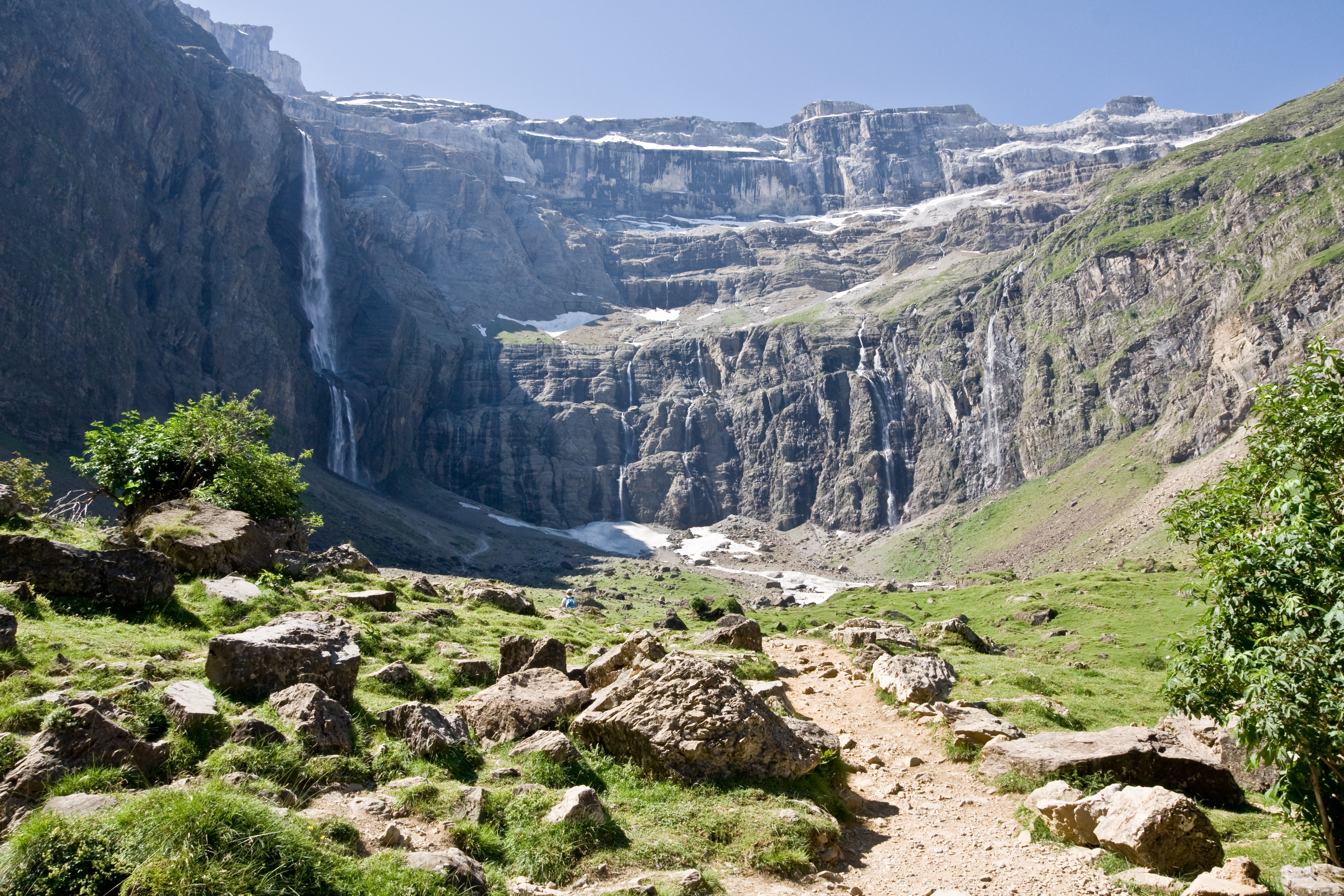
Cirque de Gavarnie

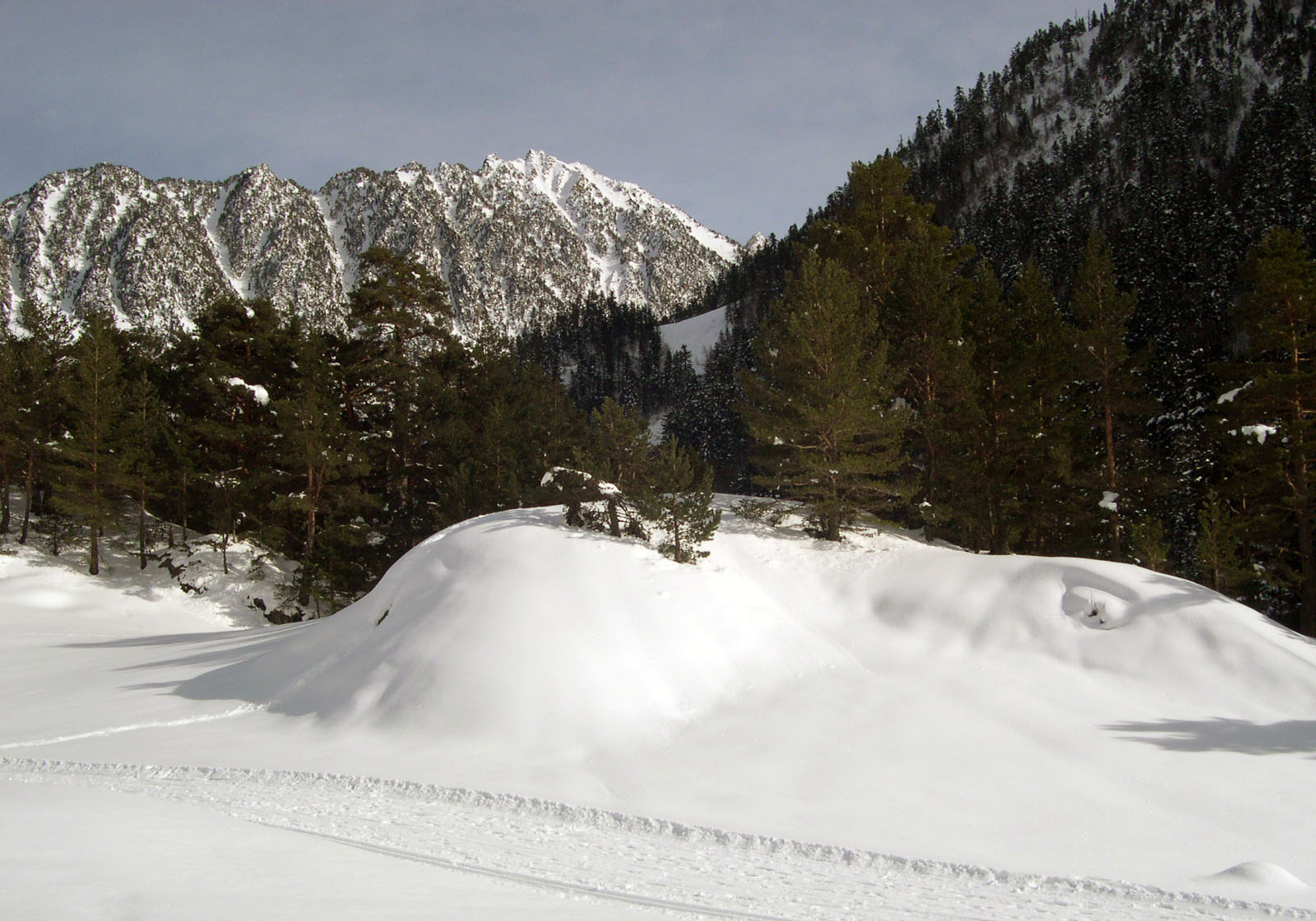
Pyrenees under snow near Cauterets

== See also ==
- Cantons of the Hautes-Pyrénées department
- Communes of the Hautes-Pyrénées department
- Arrondissements of the Hautes-Pyrénées department
