= William Banting =

English undertaker and populariser of a weight loss diet

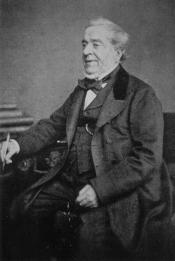
- Born: c. December 1796
- Died: 16 March 1878 (aged 81–82); Kensington, 4 The Terrace, London, England
- Occupations: Undertaker, coffin maker
- Spouse: Mary Ann (wife)
- Children: Amelia (daughter)
- Writing career
- Genre: Nonfiction
- Subject: Low-carbohydrate diet

William Banting (c. December 1796 – 16 March 1878) was an English undertaker. Formerly obese, he is also known for being the first to popularise a weight loss diet based on limiting the intake of carbohydrates, especially those of a starchy or sugary nature. He undertook his dietary changes at the suggestion of Soho Square physician William Harvey, who in turn had learned of this type of diet, but in the context of diabetes management, from attending lectures in Paris by Claude Bernard.

== Professional career ==
In the early 19th century, the family business of William Banting of St. James's Street, London, was among the most eminent companies of funeral directors in Britain. As funeral directors to the Royal Household itself, the Banting family conducted the funerals of King George III in 1820, King George IV in 1830, the Duke of Gloucester in 1834, the Duke of Wellington in 1852, Prince Albert in 1861, Prince Leopold in 1884, Queen Victoria in 1901, and King Edward VII in 1910. The royal undertaking warrant for the Banting family eventually ended in 1928 with the retirement of William Westbrook Banting.

== Weight loss diet ==
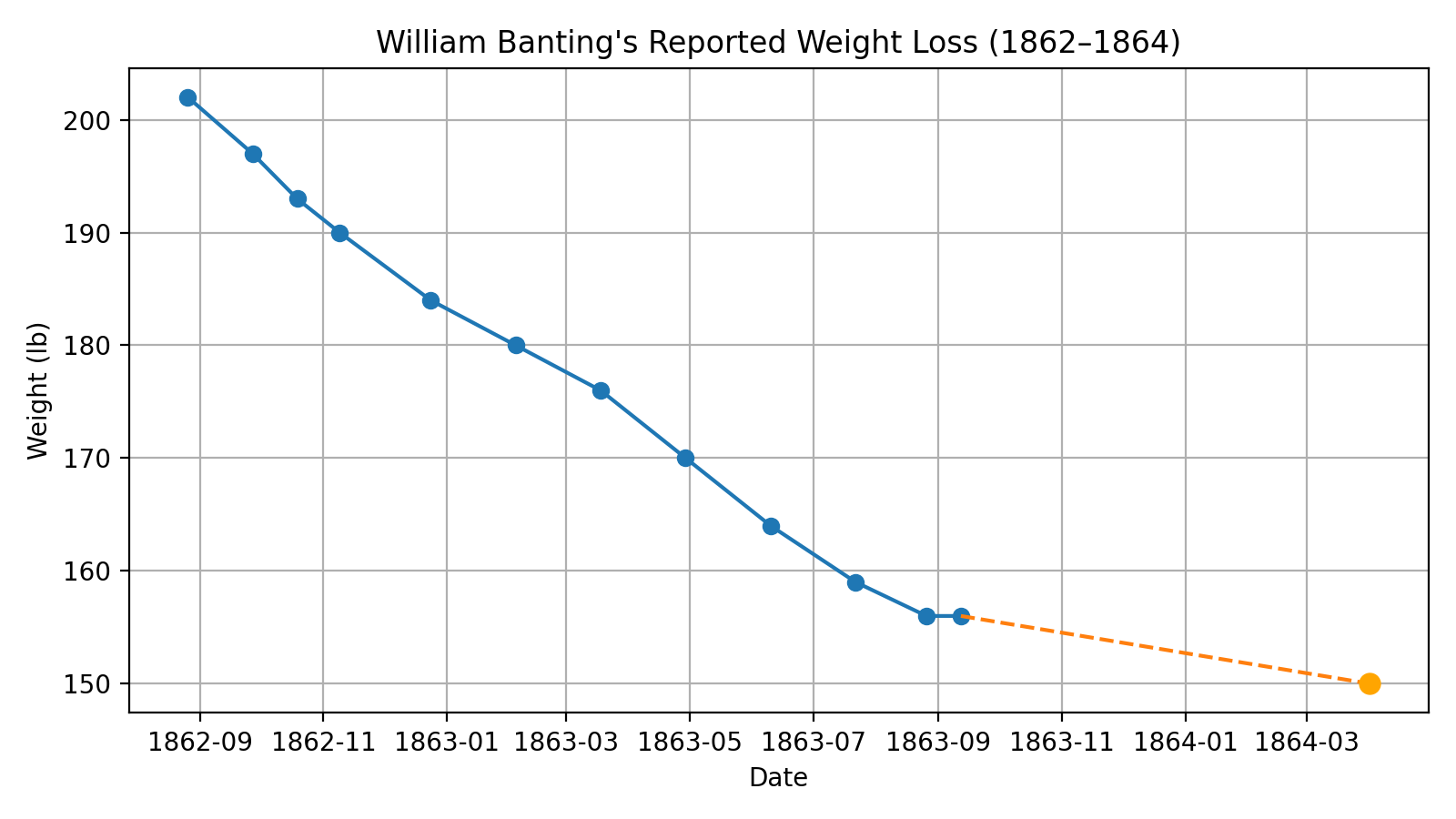
William Banting's weight loss journey represented visually, from 202 pounds (26 August 1862) to 156 pounds (12 September 1863) [1 ]; and later further reduced to 150 pounds by some unstated date prior to April 1864 (represented by the orange dotted line) [2 ].

=== Letter on Corpulence, Addressed to the Public ===
In 1863, Banting wrote a pamphlet, called Letter on Corpulence, Addressed to the Public, which contained the particular plan for the diet he followed. It was written as an open letter in the form of a personal testimonial.

Banting accounted all of his unsuccessful fasts, diets, spa and exercise regimens in his past. His previously unsuccessful attempts had been on the advice of various medical experts. He then described the dietary change which finally had worked for him, following the advice of another medical expert.

"My kind and valued medical adviser is not a doctor for obesity, but stands on the pinnacle of fame in the treatment of another malady, which, as he well knows, is frequently induced by [corpulence]." (p24)

His own diet was four meals per day, consisting of meat, greens, fruits, and dry wine. The emphasis was on avoiding sugar, saccharine matter, starch, beer, milk and butter. Banting's pamphlet was popular for years to come, and would be used as a model for modern diets. Initially, he published the booklet at his personal expense. The self-published edition was so popular that he determined to sell it to the general public. Despite the success of the booklet, Banting opted to forgo profits from the self-published versions, instead donating the profits to charity. The third and later editions were published by Harrison, London. Banting's booklet remains in print as of 2007, and is still available on-line.

== "Banting" as a verb ==
The popularity of the pamphlet mentioned above was such that the questions "Do you bant?" or "Are you banting?", still occasionally in use today, refer to his method, and sometimes even to dieting in general. In Swedish, "banta" is still the main verb for "being on a (weight loss) diet" and "bantning" the corresponding noun. Scientist Tim Noakes popularised Banting in South Africa when he named his high-fat, low-carbohydrate diet after Banting.

== Legacy ==
Gary Taubes' study of carbohydrates, Good Calories, Bad Calories, begins with a prologue entitled "A brief history of Banting" and discusses Banting at some length. Discussions of low-carbohydrate diets often begin with a discussion of Banting.

== Personal life ==
Banting was a distant relative of Sir Frederick Banting, the co-discoverer of insulin. Banting is buried alongside his wife and daughter at Kensal Green Cemetery London, England.

== See also ==
- Low carbohydrate diet
- Paleolithic diet
- Vilhjalmur Stefansson
