= Atkins Nutritionals =

American diet food brand

Atkins Nutritionals, Inc.
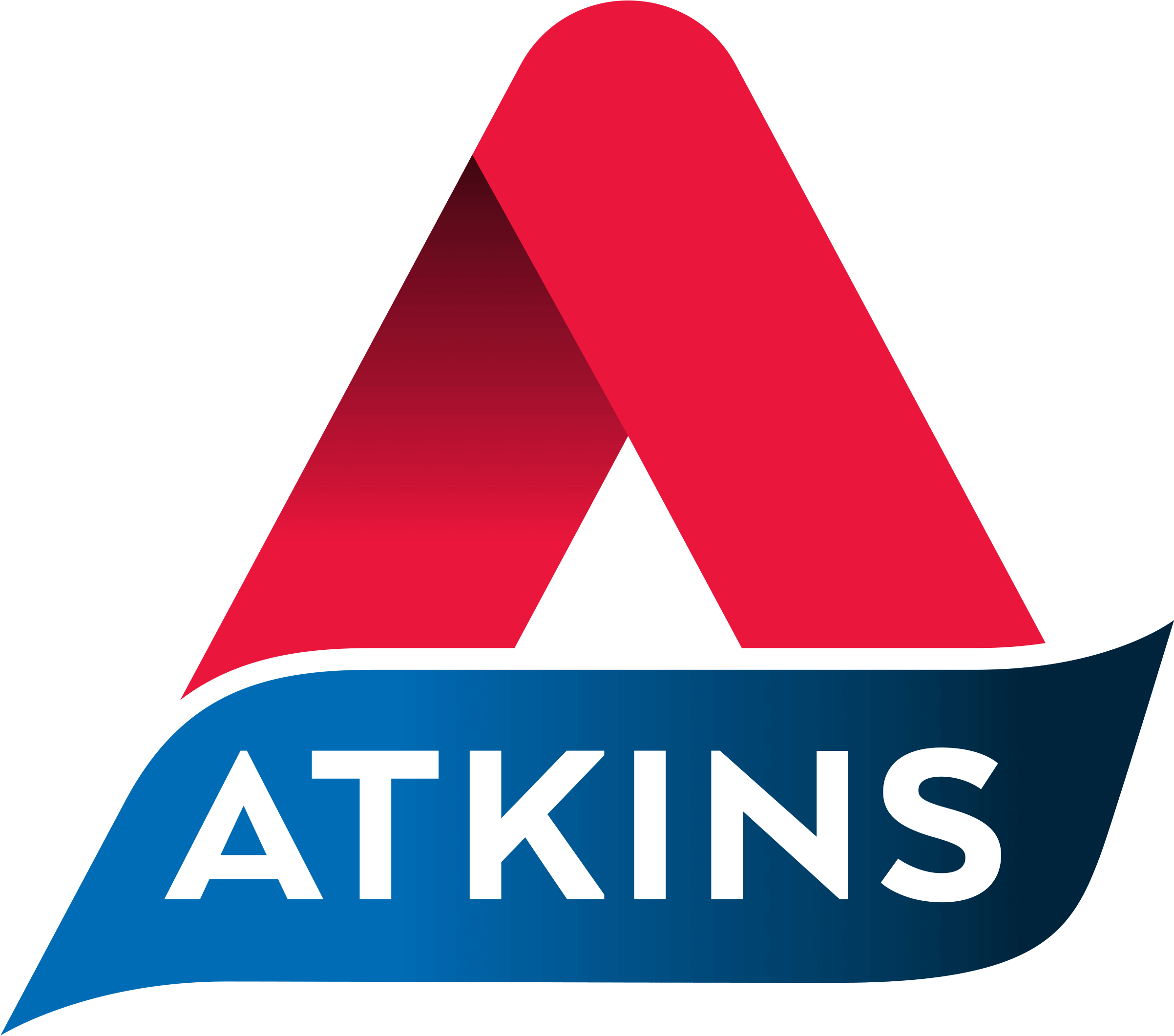
- Company type: Private
- Founded: 1989; 37 years ago
- Founder: Robert Atkins
- Owner: The Simply Good Foods Company
- Website: www.atkins.com

Atkins Nutritionals, Inc. was founded by Robert Atkins in order to promote the low-carbohydrate packaged foods of the Atkins diet. As of 2017, it is part of The Simply Good Foods Company. The company sells low-carbohydrate bars, shakes, and snacks.

== History ==
Atkins Nutritionals, Inc. was originally founded as Complementary Formulations in 1989. The company was renamed to Atkins Nutritionals in 1998. It was founded to supplement the way of the Atkins diet. The diet was developed after Atkins read a research paper in the Journal of the American Medical Association. The paper, entitled "Weight Reduction," was published by Alfred W. Pennington in 1958. Atkins used information from the study to resolve his own overweight condition.

In October 2003 Parthenon Capital LLC and Goldman Sachs both acquired stakes in the company. Following the death of its founder in 2003, the popularity of the diet and demand for Atkins products waned, causing Atkins Nutritionals Inc. to file for bankruptcy in July 2005, citing losses of $340 million.

The company emerged from bankruptcy in 2007 owned by North Castle Partners.

Roark Capital Group bought the company in 2010. In February 2015, it was reported that Roark was seeking to sell the company. In April 2017, it was reported that Conyers Park Acquisition Corporation had acquired Atkins from Roark. Conyers Park and Atkins combined under a new company called The Simply Good Foods Company.

== See also ==
- List of food companies
- South Beach Living
