= Gary Taubes =

American science writer (born 1956)

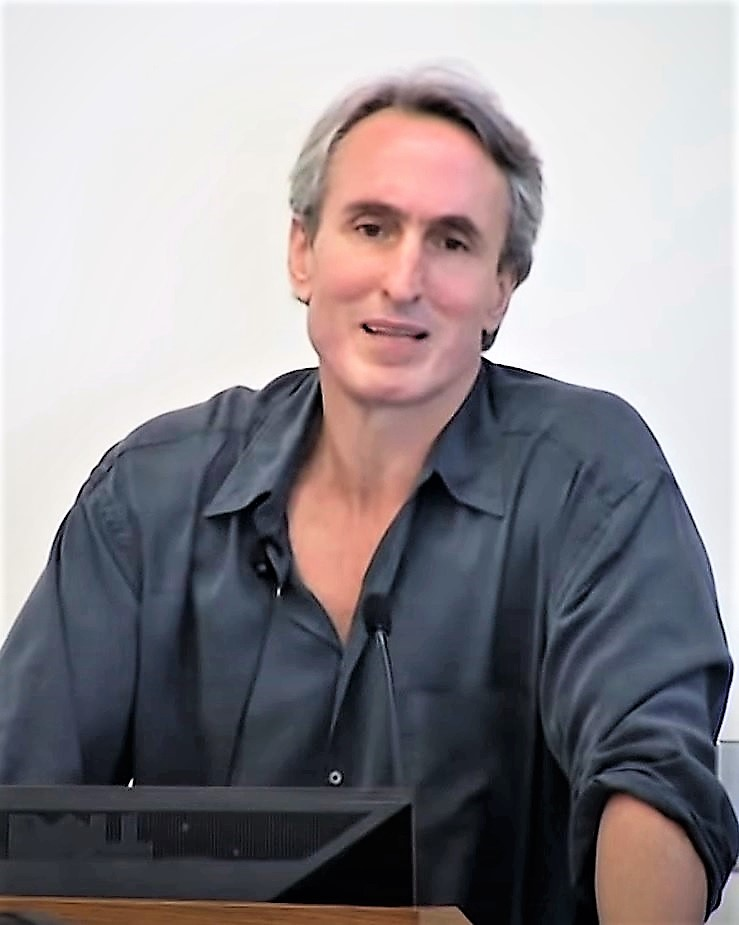
- Taubes in 2012
- Born: April 30, 1956 (age 70); Rochester, New York, U.S.
- Education: Harvard University (BS); Stanford University (MS); Columbia University (MS)
- Occupation: Journalist

Gary Taubes (born April 30, 1956) is an American journalist, writer, and low-carbohydrate / high-fat (LCHF) diet advocate. His central claim is that carbohydrates, especially sugar and high-fructose corn syrup, overstimulate the secretion of insulin, causing the body to store fat in fat cells and the liver, and that it is primarily a high level of dietary carbohydrate consumption that accounts for obesity and other metabolic syndrome conditions. He is the author of Nobel Dreams (1987); Bad Science: The Short Life and Weird Times of Cold Fusion (1993); Good Calories, Bad Calories (2007), titled The Diet Delusion (2008) in the UK and Australia; Why We Get Fat: And What to Do About It (2010); The Case Against Sugar (2016); and The Case for Keto: Rethinking Weight Control and the Science and Practice of Low-Carb/High-Fat Eating (2020). Taubes's work often goes against accepted scientific, governmental, and popular tenets such as that obesity is caused by eating too much and exercising too little and that excessive consumption of fat, especially saturated fat in animal products, leads to cardiovascular disease.

== Biography ==
Born in Rochester, New York, Taubes studied physics at Harvard University (BS, 1977) and aerospace engineering at Stanford University (MS, 1978). After receiving a master's degree in journalism at Columbia University in 1981, Taubes joined Discover magazine as a staff reporter in 1982. Since then he has written numerous articles for Discover, Science and other magazines. Originally focusing on physics issues, his interests have more recently turned to medicine and nutrition. His brother, Clifford Henry Taubes, is the William Petschek Professor of Mathematics at Harvard University.

== Scientific controversies ==
Taubes' books have all dealt with scientific controversies.

Nobel Dreams takes a critical look at the politics and experimental techniques behind the Nobel Prize-winning work of physicist Carlo Rubbia.

In Bad Science: The Short Life and Weird Times of Cold Fusion, he chronicles the short-lived media frenzy surrounding the Pons–Fleischmann cold fusion experiments of 1989. He opines in the book that heat generation in the experiments of Drs. Martin Fleischmann and Stanley Pons was due entirely to difference in ionic conductivity of deuterated salts solutions compared to normal aqueous solutions.

He also formulated an allegation of fraud regarding the results from John Bockris's research group.

== Diet advocacy ==
Gary Taubes on Bookbits radio.

Taubes gained prominence in the low-carb diet debate following the publication of his 2002 New York Times Magazine piece "What if It's All Been a Big Fat Lie?". The article, which questioned the efficacy and health benefits of low-fat diets, was seen as defending the Atkins diet against the medical establishment, and it became extremely controversial. Some scholars interviewed for the article complained that Taubes misinterpreted their words or treated them out of context. Taubes himself stated: "[E]ven though I knew the article would be the most controversial article the Times Magazine ran all year, [the reaction] still shocked me." The Center for Science in the Public Interest published a rebuttal to the Times article in its November 2002 newsletter. Cardiologist John W. Farquhar commented that "Gary Taubes tricked us all into coming across as supporters of the Atkins diet."

Taubes is an advocate of eating beef. Beef industry leader Amanda Radke has written in Beef Daily that "Today's best beef advocates wear a variety of hats [...] like Nina Teicholz or Gary Taubes who turn against conventional health advice to promote diets rich in animal fats and proteins". In a 2024 interview, Taubes stated he could "have a heart attack tomorrow, which is possible the way I eat, and which, God knows, I keep expecting".

=== Good Calories, Bad Calories ===
In 2007, Taubes published his book Good Calories, Bad Calories: Challenging the Conventional Wisdom on Diet, Weight Control, and Disease (published as The Diet Delusion in the UK). This book proposed that a hypothesis — that dietary fat is the cause of obesity and heart disease — became dogma, and claims to show how the scientific method was circumvented so a contestable hypothesis could remain unchallenged. The book uses data and studies compiled from more than a century of dietary research to support what Taubes calls "the alternative hypothesis."

Taubes' argument is that the medical community and the U.S. federal government have relied upon misinterpreted scientific data on nutrition to build the prevailing paradigm about what constitutes healthful eating. Taubes argues that — contrary to conventional nutritional science — it is a carbohydrate-laced diet, augmented with sugar, that leads to heart disease, type 2 diabetes, obesity, cancer, and other "maladies of civilization." In the Epilogue to Good Calories, Bad Calories on page 454, Taubes sets out ten "inescapable" conclusions, the first of which is, "Dietary fat, whether saturated or not, is not a cause of obesity, heart disease, or any other chronic disease of civilization."

Reviewing Good Calories, Bad Calories, obesity researcher George A. Bray wrote that the book "...has much useful information and is well worth reading" but that "obese people clearly eat more than do lean ones" and that "some of the conclusions that the author reaches are not consistent with current concepts about obesity."

In 2007, New York Times science writer John Tierney cited Taubes's book Good Calories, Bad Calories and discussed information cascades and the role of physiologist Ancel Keys in widely held beliefs related to diet and fat. Tierney follows Taubes in noting that a 2001 Cochrane meta-analysis of low-fat diets found that they had "no significant effect on mortality". Harriet A. Hall, however, has criticized Taubes for selectively quoting the meta-analysis, and, writing for Science-Based Medicine, states that although it is possible some of Taubes's hypotheses may be borne out by subsequent evidence, his idea that carbohydrate restriction can lead to weight loss independently of calorie restriction is "simply wrong".

=== The Case Against Sugar ===
Taubes authored The Case Against Sugar in 2016. The book argues that sugar is an addictive drug and is the cause of obesity and many health-related problems. It was positively reviewed by chef and food-writer Dan Barber, who described Taubes's writing as "inflammatory and copiously researched". Food journalist Joanna Blythman also praised the book, noting "his clear and persuasive argument that obesity is a hormonal disorder, switched on by sugar, is one that urgently needs wider airing."

Harriet Hall, who is known as a skeptic in the medical community, wrote that Taubes made a compelling case against sugar but the evidence was inconclusive.

C. Albert Yeung in the Journal of Public Health described the book as very informative but insufficient to draw any conclusion and a "polemic, not a balanced scientific review."

=== NuSI ===
In September, 2012, Taubes and Peter Attia launched the Nutrition Science Initiative (NuSI), a nonprofit organization they described as "a Manhattan Project-like effort to solve" the problem of obesity. The project set out to validate the "carbohydrate-insulin hypothesis", a model by which carbohydrate is proposed to be uniquely fattening because of its influence on insulin levels.

A pilot study funded by NuSI was conducted in 2014 by a team led by NIH researcher Kevin Hall, and produced evidence which did not support the hypothesis. In 2017, Kevin Hall wrote that the hypothesis had been falsified by experiment.

Not long after the completion of that study NuSI was confronted with a number of issues. They lost a significant source of funding; co-founder Peter Attia left the organization.

In 2018, NuSI was described as having "two part-time employees and an unpaid volunteer hanging around".

== Awards ==
Taubes has won the Science in Society Journalism Award of the National Association of Science Writers three times and was awarded an MIT Knight Science Journalism Fellowship for 1996–97. He is a Robert Wood Johnson Foundation independent investigator in health policy.

== Selected bibliography ==
- Nobel Dreams: Power, Deceit, and the Ultimate Experiment. Random House. 1987. ISBN 0394545036.
- Bad Science: The Short Life and Weird Times of Cold Fusion. Random House. 1993. ISBN 978-0-394-58456-0.
- "Conversations in a cell". Discover. 17 (2): 48–54. February 1996.
- "NUTRITION: The Soft Science of Dietary Fat" (PDF). Science. 291 (5513): 2536–2545. 2001. doi:10.1126/science.291.5513.2536. PMID 11286266. S2CID 54015137.
- Good Calories, Bad Calories: Challenging the Conventional Wisdom on Diet, Weight Control, and Disease. Knopf. 2007. ISBN 978-1-4000-4078-0. (Also published as The Diet Delusion ISBN 978-0-09-189141-1)
- Why we get fat and what to do about it. New York: Alfred A. Knopf. 2011. ISBN 9780307272706.
- The case against sugar. New York: Alfred A. Knopf. 2016. ISBN 978-0307701640.
- The case for Keto : rethinking weight control and the science and practice of low-carb/high-fat eating. New York: Alfred A. Knopf. 2020. ISBN 9780525520078.
- Rethinking Diabetes: what science reveals about diet, insulin, and successful treatments. New York: Alfred A. Knopf. 2024. ISBN 9780525520085.
