= South Beach Diet =

Popular fad diet

The South Beach Diet is a popular fad diet developed by Arthur Agatston and promoted in his bestselling 2003 book. It emphasizes eating food with a low glycemic index, and categorizes carbohydrates and fats as "good" or "bad". Like other fad diets, it may have elements which are generally recognized as sensible, but it promises benefits not backed by supporting evidence or sound science.

== Technique ==
The diet has three stages and gradually increases the proportion of carbohydrate consumed as it progresses while simultaneously decreasing the proportions of fat and protein. It includes a number of recommended foods such as lean meats and vegetables and has a concept of "good" (mostly monounsaturated) fats. It makes no restriction on calorie intake, includes an exercise program, and is based around taking three main meals and two snacks per day.

The first stage of the diet aims for rapid weight loss (8 to 13 lbs in two weeks). According to the UK's National Health Service (NHS), the severity of the first stage of the diet may result in the loss of some vitamins, minerals and fiber. The NHS reports that dietary restrictions during stage one may cause side effects including "bad breath, a dry mouth, tiredness, dizziness, insomnia, nausea, and constipation." Such symptoms would be rectified once the less extreme phases of the diet then began.

== Health effects ==
Like other fad diets, the South Beach Diet has been marketed with bold claims that are not supported by evidence and with an unrealistic promise of easy weight loss. The book that promotes it also contains some incorrect and misleading information. Nevertheless, some aspects of the diet correspond with dietary advice that is recognized as sensible: its last two stages are sufficiently nutritious to be considered healthy. Like other high-fat diets, its short-term safety has been established, but its long-term safety has not.

The diet is promoted as improving risk factors associated with cardiovascular disease, but the effectiveness for improving these risk factors is unclear because no evidence on its effects is available. A trial found no change in weight loss compared to usual care.

South Beach Diet and other low-carbohydrate diets lack dietary fiber. Fiber is generally considered to aid weight loss and to help prevent obesity.

== Difference from other low-carb diets ==
Many sources place the South Beach Diet on lists of "low carb" diets such as the Atkins Diet. While the South Beach diet does prohibit foods rich in simple carbohydrates such as white bread, white potatoes and white rice, it does not require dieters to forgo carbohydrates entirely or even measure their intake. Instead, it focuses on the "glycemic impact" (short term change in blood glucose) of foods. (Nutritionists continue, however, to question the net benefit of the first phase to dieters not affected by impaired glucose metabolism.) Many vegetables are permitted even in phase 1. Complex, fiber-rich carbohydrate sources such as brown rice and 100% whole grain bread are permitted during phase 2. Agatston has tried to distance the South Beach Diet from "low carb" approaches; in the South Beach Diet book he wrote: "It is my purpose to teach neither low-fat nor low-carb. I want you to learn to choose the right fats and the right carbs."

== History ==
The South Beach Diet was developed in the mid-1990s by celebrity doctor Arthur Agatston with the assistance of Marie Almon, the former chief dietitian at Mount Sinai Medical Center in Miami Beach, Florida. Originally called the Modified Carbohydrate Diet, the plan was renamed the South Beach Diet after the South Beach neighborhood in Miami Beach near Agatston's practice.

The diet plan was initially developed for Agatston's own patients. Agatston noticed that the American Heart Association's recommended low-fat and high-carbohydrate diet was not lowering his patients' weight, cholesterol, or blood sugar levels, but that his patients on the Atkins diet were experiencing weight loss. Unwilling to prescribe the Atkins approach to patients with cardiac issues due to the diet's allowance of saturated fat and limitation of carbohydrates containing fiber and other nutrients, Agatston referenced medical research to build an eating plan that categorized fats and carbohydrates as good or bad and emphasized lean protein and fiber.

The plan grew in popularity as a method of weight loss as Agatston reported the results at conferences and patients distributed photocopies outlining the diet throughout the late 1990s and early 2000s. In 1999 a Miami TV news show put people on the diet and broadcast the results, popularizing the diet locally.

The first book describing the diet, The South Beach Diet, was written by Agatston and was released in April 2003. By 2004 there were about 8 million copies in print, a trade paperback South Beach Diet Good Fats/Good Carbs Guide had 3 million copies in print, and The South Beach Diet Cookbook went on sale with a printing of 1.75 million copies.

In 2004, former US President Bill Clinton reportedly followed the diet.

In 2008, Agatston published The South Beach Diet Supercharged, written with Joseph Signorile, a professor of exercise physiology; it included an interval training program. A review for the Academy of Nutrition and Dietetics found that "Readers are likely to see success using this diet and fitness book. I recommend skipping the restrictive Phase One meal plans and instead follow the more balanced Phase Two diet. The simple 20-minute-a-day exercise program is a realistic and inexpensive approach to fitness."

SBD Enterprises LLC, of which Agatston is a part owner, owns the "South Beach Diet" trademark. In December 2015, Nutrisystem acquired SBD for $15 million. Nutrisystem said that it planned to launch new lines of South Beach products by 2017 that it would market through retail stores and on the internet.

In December 2018, South Beach announced that they would launch a keto-friendly diet in 2019.

== See also ==
- List of diets
- Low-glycemic index diet
- Online weight loss plans
