= Fedon Lindberg =

Norwegian politician

Fedon Lindberg (born 6 November 1962) is a Greek-born Norwegian physician and weight loss guru.

Lindberg was born and grew up in Greece, he migrated to Norway in 1986. He was educated as a physician and became a specialist in internal medicine, eventually focusing on weight control. He became a best-selling non-fiction author in the early 2000s, with the nutrition and weightloss books Naturlig slank med kost i balanse (2001) and Kokeboken naturlig slank (2002), where he advocates a no carb diet.
