= Bad science =

Bad science may refer to:

- Antiscience
- Cargo cult science
- Fabrication (science)
- Fringe science
- Junk science
- Pathological science
- Pseudoscience
- Publication bias
- Scientific misconduct
- The "Bad Science" column by Ben Goldacre in The Guardian
- Bad Science (Goldacre book), a 2008 book by Ben Goldacre
- Bad Science (Taubes book), a 1993 book by Gary Taubes
