= Ketogenic diet =

High-fat dietary therapy for epilepsy

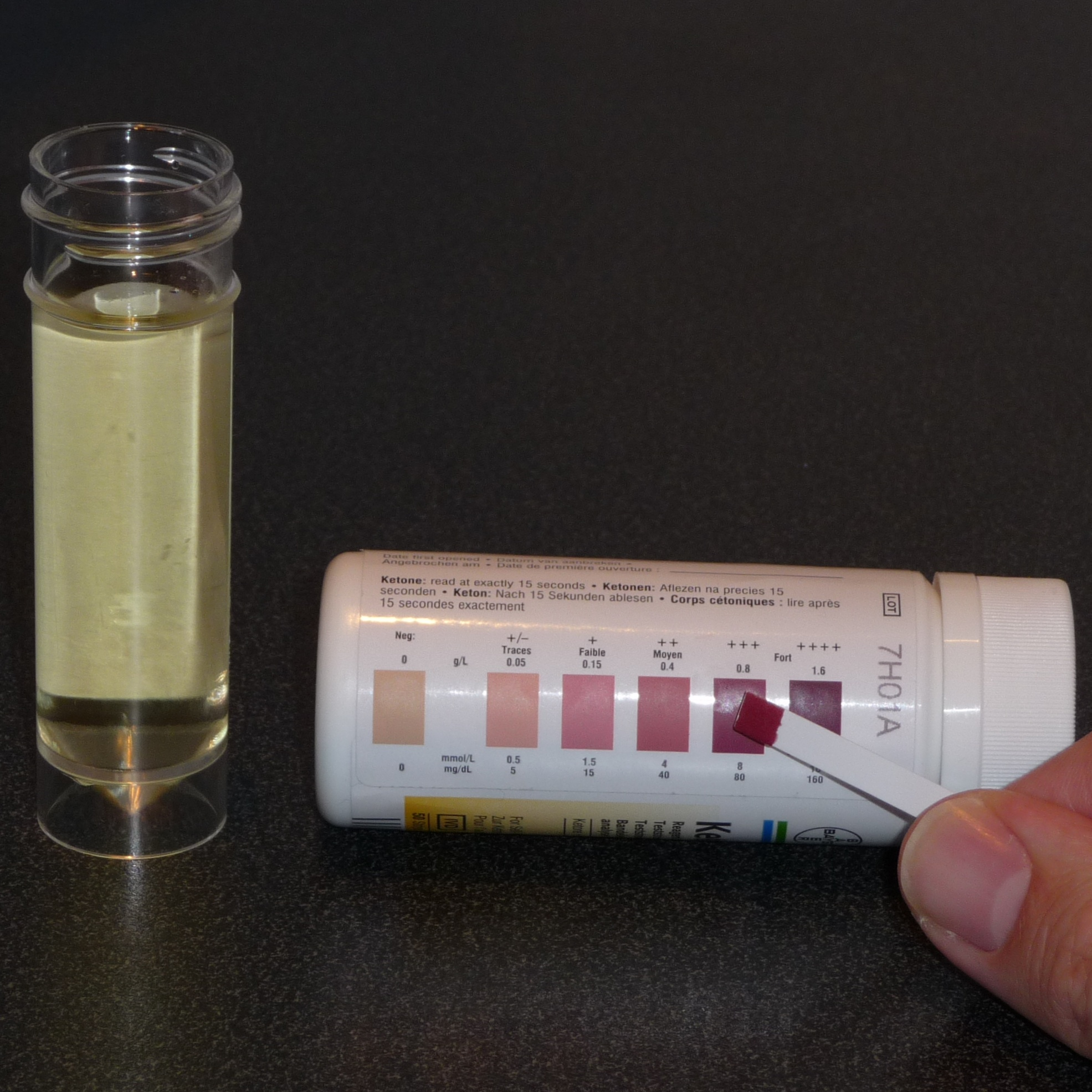
Testing for ketone bodies in urine

The ketogenic diet is a high-fat, adequate-protein, low-carbohydrate dietary therapy that in conventional medicine is used mainly to treat hard-to-control (refractory) epilepsy in children. The diet forces the body to burn fats rather than carbohydrates.

Carbohydrates in food are converted into glucose, which is then transported around the body and is important in fueling brain function. However, if there is very little carbohydrate in the diet, the liver converts fat into fatty acids and ketone bodies, the latter passing into the brain and replacing glucose as an energy source. An elevated level of ketone bodies in the blood (a state called ketosis) eventually lowers the frequency of epileptic seizures. Around half of children and young people with epilepsy who have tried some form of this diet saw the number of seizures drop by at least half, and the effect persists after discontinuing the diet. Some evidence shows that adults with epilepsy may benefit from the diet and that a less strict regimen, such as a modified Atkins diet, is similarly effective. Side effects may include constipation, high cholesterol, growth slowing, acidosis, and kidney stones.

The original therapeutic diet for paediatric epilepsy provides just enough protein for body growth and repair, and sufficient calories (Note: In this article, kcal stands for calories as a unit of measure (4.1868 kJ), and calories stands for "energy" from food.) to maintain the correct weight for age and height. The classic therapeutic ketogenic diet was developed for treatment of paediatric epilepsy in the 1920s and was widely used into the next decade, but its popularity waned with the introduction of effective anticonvulsant medications. This classic ketogenic diet contains a 4:1 ketogenic ratio or ratio by weight of fat to combined protein and carbohydrate. This is achieved by excluding high-carbohydrate foods such as starchy fruits and vegetables, bread, pasta, grains, and sugar, while increasing the consumption of foods high in fat such as nuts, cream, and butter. Most dietary fat is made of molecules called long-chain triglycerides (LCTs). However, medium-chain triglycerides (MCTs)—made from fatty acids with shorter carbon chains than LCTs—are more ketogenic. A variant of the classic diet known as the MCT ketogenic diet uses a form of coconut oil, which is rich in MCTs, to provide around half the calories. As less overall fat is needed in this variant of the diet, a greater proportion of carbohydrate and protein can be consumed, allowing a greater variety of food choices.

In 1994, Hollywood producer Jim Abrahams, whose son's severe epilepsy was effectively controlled by the diet, created the Charlie Foundation for Ketogenic Therapies to further promote diet therapy. Publicity included an appearance on NBC's Dateline program and ...First Do No Harm (1997), a made-for-television film starring Meryl Streep. The foundation sponsored a research study, the results of which—announced in 1996—marked the beginning of renewed scientific interest in the diet.

Possible therapeutic uses for the ketogenic diet have been studied for many additional neurological disorders, some of which include: Alzheimer's disease, amyotrophic lateral sclerosis, headache, neurotrauma, pain, Parkinson's disease, and sleep disorders.

== Epilepsy ==
Epilepsy is one of the most common neurological disorders after migraine and stroke, affecting around 50 million people worldwide. It is diagnosed in a person having recurrent, unprovoked seizures. These occur when cortical neurons fire excessively, hypersynchronously, or both, leading to temporary disruption of normal brain function. This might affect, for example, the muscles, the senses, consciousness, or a combination. A seizure can be focal (confined to a specific part of the brain) or generalised (spread widely throughout the brain and leading to a loss of consciousness). Epilepsy can occur for a variety of reasons; some forms have been classified into epileptic syndromes, most of which begin in childhood. Epilepsy is considered refractory (not yielding to treatment) when two or three anticonvulsant drugs have failed to control it. About 60% of patients achieve control of their epilepsy with the first drug they use, whereas around 30% do not achieve control with drugs. When drugs fail, other options include epilepsy surgery, vagus nerve stimulation, and the ketogenic diet.

== History ==
The ketogenic diet is a mainstream medical dietary therapy that was developed to reproduce the success and remove the limitations of the non-mainstream use of fasting to treat epilepsy. (Note: Unless otherwise stated, the term fasting in this article refers to going without food while maintaining calorie-free fluid intake.) Although popular in the 1920s and '30s, it was largely abandoned in favour of new anticonvulsant drugs. Most individuals with epilepsy can successfully control their seizures with medication. However, 25–30% fail to achieve such control despite trying a number of different drugs. For this group, and for children in particular, the diet has once again found a role in epilepsy management.

=== Fasting ===
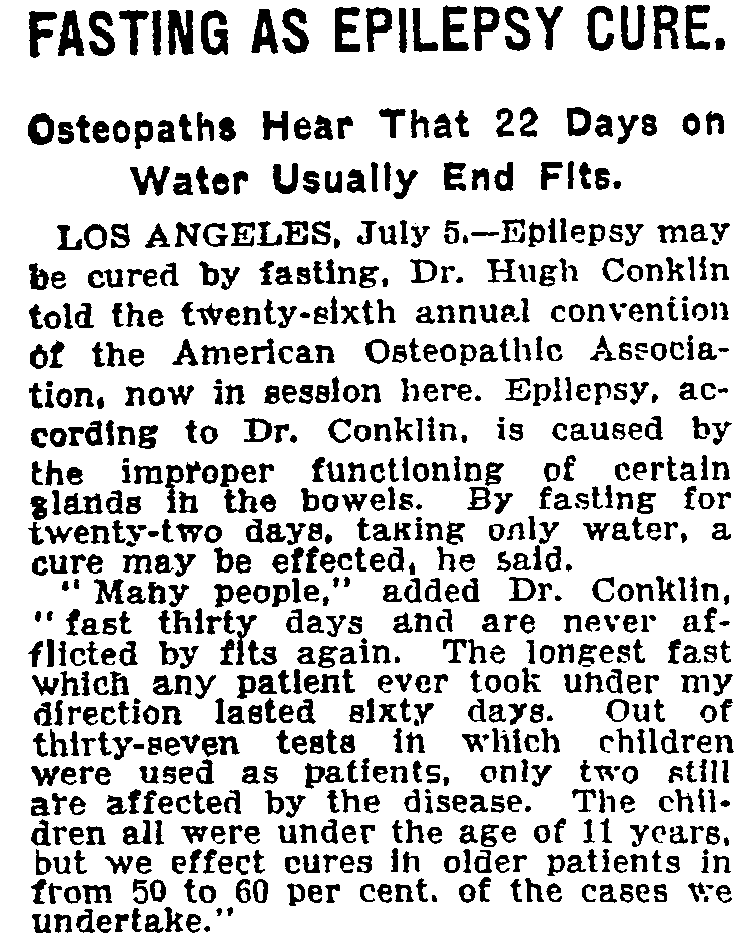
A news report of Dr Hugh Conklin's "water diet" treatment from 1922

Physicians of ancient Greece treated diseases, including epilepsy, by altering their patients' diet. An early treatise in the Hippocratic Corpus, On the Sacred Disease, covers the disease; it dates from c. 400 BC. Its author argued against the prevailing view that epilepsy was supernatural in origin and cure, and proposed that dietary therapy had a rational and physical basis. (Note: Hippocrates, On the Sacred Disease, ch. 18; vol. 6.) In the same collection, the author of Epidemics describes the case of a man whose epilepsy is cured as quickly as it had appeared, through complete abstinence of food and drink. (Note: Hippocrates, Epidemics, VII, 46; vol. 5.) The royal physician Erasistratus declared, "One inclining to epilepsy should be made to fast without mercy and be put on short rations." (Note: Galen, De venae sect. adv. Erasistrateos Romae degentes, c. 8; vol. 11.) Galen believed an "attenuating diet" (Note: Galen, De victu attenuante, c. 1.) might afford a cure in mild cases and be helpful in others.

The first modern study of fasting as a treatment for epilepsy was in France in 1911. Twenty epilepsy patients of all ages were "detoxified" by consuming a low-calorie vegetarian diet, combined with periods of fasting and purging. Two benefited enormously, but most failed to maintain compliance with the imposed restrictions. The diet improved the patients' mental capabilities, in contrast to their medication, potassium bromide, which dulled the mind.

Around this time, Bernarr Macfadden, an American exponent of physical culture, popularised the use of fasting to restore health. His disciple, the osteopathic physician Dr. Hugh William Conklin of Battle Creek, Michigan, began to treat his epilepsy patients by recommending fasting. Conklin conjectured that epileptic seizures were caused when a toxin, secreted from the Peyer's patches in the intestines, was discharged into the bloodstream. He recommended a fast lasting 18 to 25 days to allow this toxin to dissipate. Conklin probably treated hundreds of epilepsy patients with his "water diet" and boasted of a 90% cure rate in children, falling to 50% in adults. Later analysis of Conklin's case records showed 20% of his patients achieved freedom from seizures and 50% had some improvement.

Conklin's fasting therapy was adopted by neurologists in mainstream practice. In 1916, a Dr McMurray wrote to the New York Medical Journal claiming to have successfully treated epilepsy patients with a fast, followed by a starch- and sugar-free diet, since 1912. In 1921, prominent endocrinologist Henry Rawle Geyelin reported his experiences to the American Medical Association convention. He had seen Conklin's success first-hand and had attempted to reproduce the results in 36 of his own patients. He achieved similar results despite having studied the patients for only a short time. Further studies in the 1920s indicated that seizures generally returned after the fast. Charles P. Howland, the parent of one of Conklin's successful patients and a wealthy New York corporate lawyer, gave his brother John Elias Howland a gift of $5,000 to study "the ketosis of starvation". As professor of paediatrics at Johns Hopkins Hospital, John E. Howland used the money to fund research undertaken by neurologist Stanley Cobb and his assistant William G. Lennox.

=== Diet ===
In 1921, Rollin Turner Woodyatt reviewed the research on diet and diabetes. He reported that three water-soluble compounds, β-hydroxybutyrate, acetoacetate, and acetone (known collectively as ketone bodies), were produced by the liver in otherwise healthy people when they were starved or if they consumed a very low-carbohydrate, high-fat diet. Dr. Russell Morse Wilder, at the Mayo Clinic, built on this research and coined the term "ketogenic diet" to describe a diet that produced a high level of ketone bodies in the blood (ketonemia) through an excess of fat and lack of carbohydrate. Wilder hoped to obtain the benefits of fasting in a dietary therapy that could be maintained indefinitely. His trial on a few epilepsy patients in 1921 was the first use of the ketogenic diet as a treatment for epilepsy.

Wilder's colleague, paediatrician Mynie Gustav Peterman, later formulated the classic diet, with a ratio of one gram of protein per kilogram of body weight in children, 10–15 g of carbohydrate per day, and the remainder of calories from fat. Peterman's work in the 1920s established the techniques for induction and maintenance of the diet. Peterman documented positive effects (improved alertness, behaviour, and sleep) and adverse effects (nausea and vomiting due to excess ketosis). The diet proved to be very successful in children: Peterman reported in 1925 that 95% of 37 young patients had improved seizure control on the diet and 60% became seizure-free. By 1930, the diet had also been studied in 100 teenagers and adults. Clifford Joseph Barborka Sr., also from the Mayo Clinic, reported that 56% of those older patients improved on the diet and 12% became seizure-free. Although the adult results are similar to modern studies of children, they did not compare as well to contemporary studies. Barborka concluded that adults were least likely to benefit from the diet, and the use of the ketogenic diet in adults was not studied again until 1999.

=== Anticonvulsants and decline ===
During the 1920s and 1930s, when the only anticonvulsant drugs were the sedative bromides (discovered 1857) and phenobarbital (1912), the ketogenic diet was widely used and studied. This changed in 1938 when H. Houston Merritt Jr. and Tracy Putnam discovered phenytoin (Dilantin), and the focus of research shifted to discovering new drugs. With the introduction of sodium valproate in the 1970s, drugs were available to neurologists that were effective across a broad range of epileptic syndromes and seizure types. The use of the ketogenic diet, by this time, restricted to difficult cases such as Lennox–Gastaut syndrome, declined further.

=== MCT diet ===
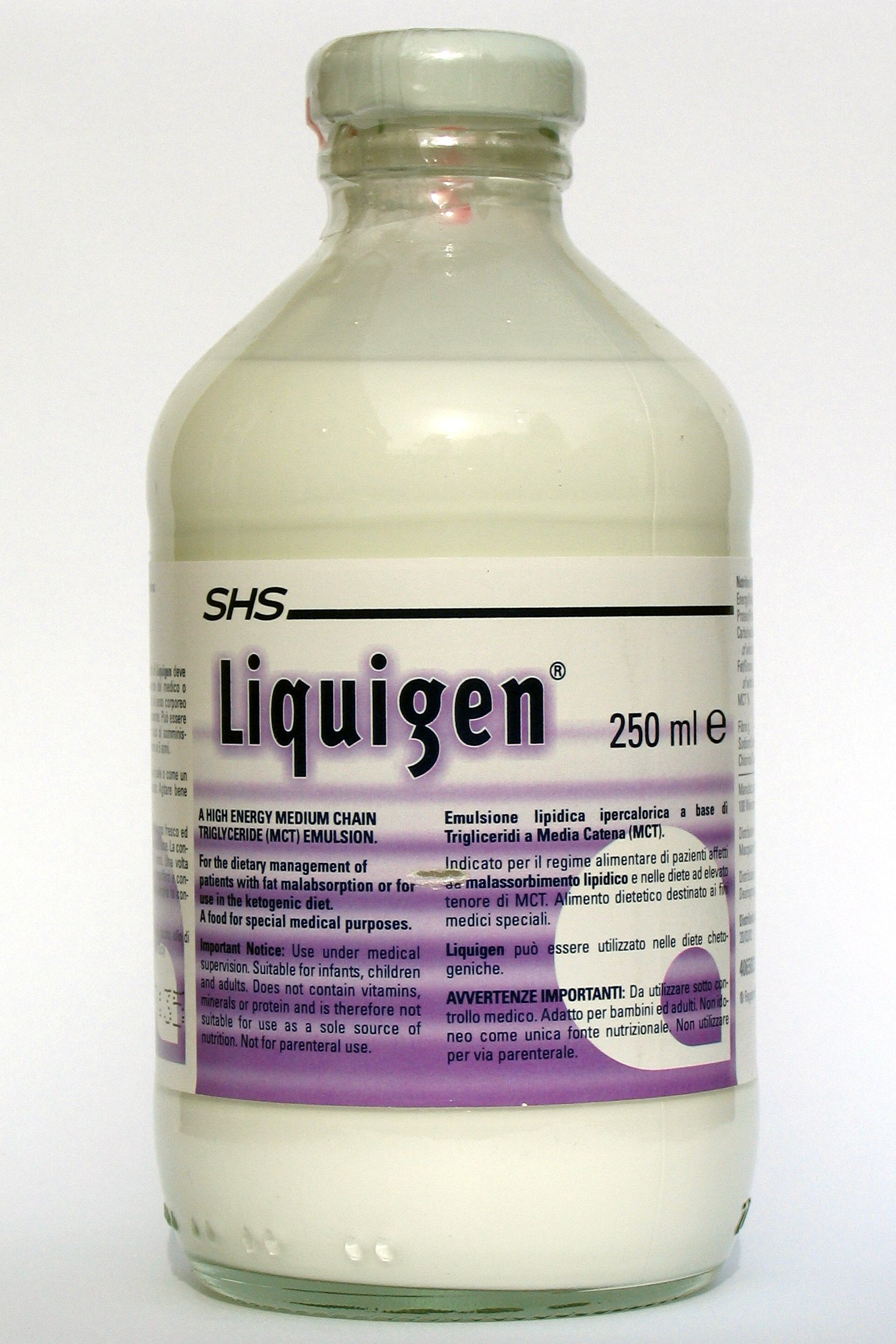
Medium-chain triglyceride (MCT) oil emulsion

In the 1960s, medium-chain triglycerides (MCTs) were found to produce more ketone bodies per unit of energy than normal dietary fats (which are mostly long-chain triglycerides). MCTs are more efficiently absorbed and are rapidly transported to the liver via the hepatic portal system rather than the lymphatic system. The severe carbohydrate restrictions of the classic ketogenic diet made it difficult for parents to produce palatable meals that their children would tolerate. In 1971, Peter Huttenlocher devised a ketogenic diet where about 60% of the calories came from the MCT oil, and this allowed more protein and up to three times as much carbohydrate as the classic ketogenic diet. The oil was mixed with at least twice its volume of skimmed milk, chilled, and sipped during the meal or incorporated into food. He tested it on 12 children and adolescents with intractable seizures. Most children improved in both seizure control and alertness, results that were similar to the classic ketogenic diet. Gastrointestinal upset was a problem, which led one patient to abandon the diet, but meals were easier to prepare and better accepted by the children. The MCT diet replaced the classic ketogenic diet in many hospitals, though some devised diets that were a combination of the two.

=== Revival ===
The ketogenic diet achieved national media exposure in the US in October 1994, when NBC's Dateline television programme reported the case of Charlie Abrahams, son of Hollywood producer Jim Abrahams. The two-year-old had epilepsy that had remained uncontrolled by mainstream and alternative therapies. Abrahams discovered a reference to the ketogenic diet in an epilepsy guide for parents and brought Charlie to John M. Freeman at Johns Hopkins Hospital, which had continued to offer the therapy. Under the diet, Charlie's epilepsy was rapidly controlled and his developmental progress resumed. This inspired Abrahams to create the Charlie Foundation to promote the diet and fund research. A multicentre prospective study began in 1994; the results were presented to the American Epilepsy Society in 1996 and were published in 1998. There followed an explosion of scientific interest in the diet. In 1997, Abrahams produced a TV drama film, ...First Do No Harm, starring Meryl Streep, in which a young boy's intractable epilepsy is successfully treated by the ketogenic diet.

By 2007, the ketogenic diet was available from around 75 centres in 45 countries, and less restrictive variants, such as the modified Atkins diet, were in use, particularly among older children and adults. The ketogenic diet was also under investigation for the treatment of a wide variety of disorders other than epilepsy.

== Efficacy ==
The ketogenic diet reduces seizure frequency by more than 50% in half of the patients who try it and by more than 90% in a third of patients. Three-quarters of children who respond do so within two weeks, though experts recommend a trial of at least three months before assuming it has been ineffective. Children with refractory epilepsy are more likely to benefit from the ketogenic diet than from trying another anticonvulsant drug. Adolescents and adults may also benefit from the diet, though compliance with oral diet (vs tube fed) remains a problem.

=== Trial design ===
Early studies reported high success rates; in one study in 1925, 60% of patients became seizure-free, and another 35% of patients had a 50% reduction in seizure frequency. These studies generally examined a cohort of patients recently treated by the physician (a retrospective study) and selected patients who had successfully maintained the dietary restrictions. However, these studies are difficult to compare to modern trials. One reason is that these older trials suffered from selection bias, as they excluded patients who were unable to start or maintain the diet and thereby selected from patients who would generate better results. In an attempt to control for this bias, modern study design prefers a prospective cohort (the patients in the study are chosen before therapy begins) in which the results are presented for all patients regardless of whether they started or completed the treatment (known as intent-to-treat analysis).

Another difference between older and newer studies is that the type of patients treated with the ketogenic diet has changed over time. When first developed and used, the ketogenic diet was not a treatment of last resort; in contrast, the children in modern studies have already tried and failed a number of anticonvulsant drugs, so may be assumed to have more difficult-to-treat epilepsy. Early and modern studies also differ because the treatment protocol has changed. In older protocols, the diet was initiated with a prolonged fast, designed to lose 5–10% body weight, and heavily restricted the calorie intake. Concerns over child health and growth led to a relaxation of the diet's restrictions. Fluid restriction was once a feature of the diet, but this led to increased risk of constipation and kidney stones, and is no longer considered beneficial.

=== Outcomes ===
A study with an intent-to-treat prospective design was published in 1998 by a team from the Johns Hopkins Hospital and followed-up by a report published in 2001. As with most studies of the ketogenic diet, no control group (patients who did not receive the treatment) was used. The study enrolled 150 children. After three months, 83% of them were still on the diet, 26% had experienced a good reduction in seizures, 31% had had an excellent reduction, and 3% were seizure-free. (Note: A good reduction is defined here to mean a 50–90% decrease in seizure frequency. An excellent reduction is a 90–99% decrease.) At 12 months, 55% were still on the diet, 23% had a good response, 20% had an excellent response, and 7% were seizure-free. Those who had discontinued the diet by this stage did so because it was ineffective, too restrictive, or due to illness, and most of those who remained were benefiting from it. The percentage of those still on the diet at two, three, and four years was 39%, 20%, and 12%, respectively. During this period, the most common reason for discontinuing the diet was because the children had become seizure-free or significantly better. At four years, 16% of the original 150 children had a good reduction in seizure frequency, 14% had an excellent reduction, and 13% were seizure-free, though these figures include many who were no longer on the diet. Those remaining on the diet after this duration were typically not seizure-free, but had had an excellent response.

It is possible to combine the results of several small studies to produce evidence that is stronger than that available from each study alone—a statistical method known as meta-analysis. One of four such analyses, conducted in 2006, looked at 19 studies on a total of 1,084 patients. It concluded that a third achieved an excellent reduction in seizure frequency and half the patients achieved a good reduction.

A Cochrane systematic review in 2018 found and analysed eleven randomized controlled trials of ketogenic diet in people with epilepsy for whom drugs failed to control their seizures. Six of the trials compared a group assigned to a ketogenic diet with a group not assigned to one. The other trials compared types of diets or ways of introducing them to make them more tolerable. In the largest trial of the ketogenic diet with a non-diet control, nearly 38% of the children and young people had half or fewer seizures with the diet compared to 6% with the group not assigned to the diet. Two large trials of the Modified Atkins Diet compared to a non-diet control had similar results, with over 50% of children having half or fewer seizures with the diet compared to around 10% in the control group.

A systematic review in 2018 looked at 16 studies on the ketogenic diet in adults. It concluded that the treatment was becoming more popular for that group of patients, that the efficacy in adults was similar to children, and the side effects relatively mild. However, many patients gave up the diet, for various reasons, and the quality of evidence was inferior to studies on children. Health issues include high levels of low-density lipoprotein, high total cholesterol, and weight loss.

== Indications and contraindications ==
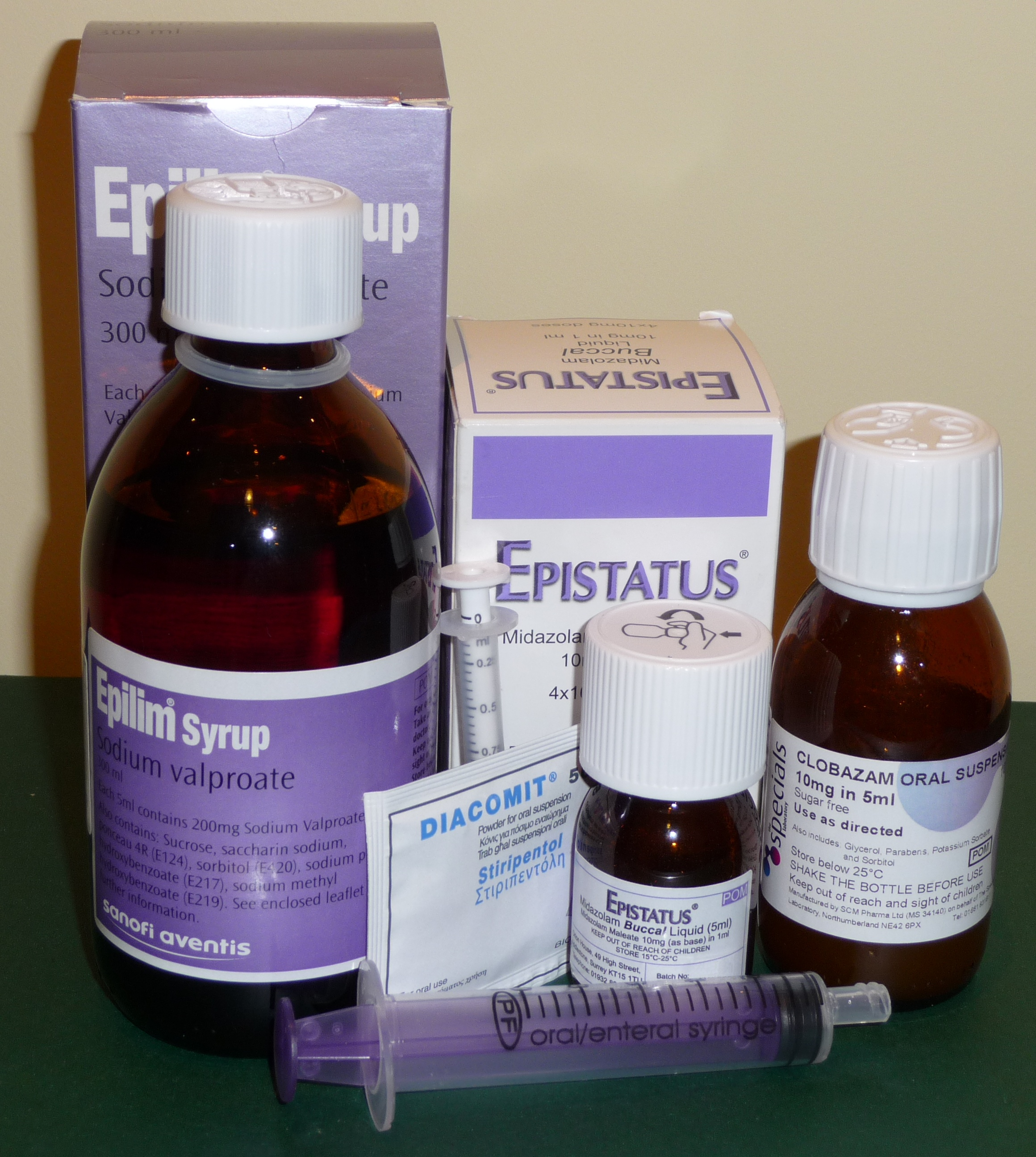
Experts on the ketogenic diet recommend it be strongly considered for children with uncontrolled epilepsy who have tried and failed two anticonvulsant drugs; most children who start the ketogenic diet have failed at least three times this number.

The ketogenic diet is indicated as an adjunctive (additional) treatment in children and young people with drug-resistant epilepsy. It is approved by national clinical guidelines in Scotland, England, and Wales and reimbursed by nearly all US insurance companies. Children with a focal lesion (a single point of brain abnormality causing the epilepsy) who would make suitable candidates for surgery are more likely to become seizure-free with surgery than with the ketogenic diet. About a third of epilepsy centres that offer the ketogenic diet also offer a dietary therapy to adults. The two less restrictive dietary variants—the low glycaemic index treatment and the modified Atkins diet—are more appropriate for adolescents and adults, mainly due to better adherence. A liquid form of the ketogenic diet is particularly easy to prepare for, and well tolerated by, infants on formula and others who are tube-fed.

Advocates for the diet recommend that it be seriously considered after two medications have failed, as the chance of other drugs succeeding is only 10%. The diet is recommended earlier for some epilepsy and genetic syndromes where it has shown particular usefulness. These include Dravet syndrome, infantile spasms, myoclonic-astatic epilepsy, tuberous sclerosis complex and for children fed by gastrostomy tube.

A survey in 2005 of 88 paediatric neurologists in the US found that 36% regularly prescribed the diet after three or more drugs had failed, 24% occasionally prescribed the diet as a last resort, 24% had only prescribed the diet in a few rare cases, and 16% had never prescribed the diet. Several possible explanations exist for this gap between evidence and clinical practice. One major factor may be the lack of adequately trained dietitians who are needed to administer a ketogenic diet programme.

Because the ketogenic diet alters the body's metabolism, it is a first-line therapy in children with certain congenital metabolic diseases such as pyruvate dehydrogenase (E1) deficiency and glucose transporter 1 deficiency syndrome, which prevent the body from using carbohydrates as fuel, leading to a dependency on ketone bodies. The ketogenic diet is beneficial in treating the seizures and some other symptoms in these diseases and is an absolute indication. However, it is absolutely contraindicated in the treatment of other diseases such as pyruvate carboxylase deficiency, porphyria, and other rare genetic disorders of fat metabolism. Persons with a disorder of fatty acid oxidation are unable to metabolise fatty acids, which replace carbohydrates as the major energy source on the diet. On the ketogenic diet, their bodies would consume their own protein stores for fuel, leading to ketoacidosis, and eventually coma and death.

== Interactions ==
The ketogenic diet is usually initiated in combination with the patient's existing anticonvulsant regimen, though patients may be weaned off anticonvulsants if the diet is successful. There is some evidence of synergistic benefits when the diet is combined with the vagus nerve stimulator or with the drug zonisamide, and that the diet may be less successful in children receiving phenobarbital.

== Adverse effects ==
The ketogenic diet is not considered a benign, holistic, or all-natural treatment. It may result in complications, although these are generally less severe and less frequent than with anticonvulsant medication or surgery. Common but easily treatable short-term side effects include constipation, low-grade acidosis, and hypoglycaemia if an initial fast is undertaken. Raised levels of lipids in the blood affect up to 60% of children and cholesterol levels may increase by around 30%. This can be treated by changes to the fat content of the diet, such as from saturated fats towards polyunsaturated fats, and if persistent, by lowering the ketogenic ratio. Supplements are necessary to counter the dietary deficiency of many micronutrients.

Long-term use of the ketogenic diet in children increases the risk of slowed or stunted growth, bone fractures, and kidney stones. The diet reduces levels of insulin-like growth factor 1, which is important for childhood growth. Like many anticonvulsant drugs, the ketogenic diet has an adverse effect on bone health. Many factors may be involved such as acidosis and suppressed growth hormone. About one in 20 children on the ketogenic diet develop kidney stones (compared with one in several thousand for the general population). A class of anticonvulsants known as carbonic anhydrase inhibitors (topiramate, zonisamide) are known to increase the risk of kidney stones, but the combination of these anticonvulsants and the ketogenic diet does not appear to elevate the risk above that of the diet alone. The stones are treatable and do not justify discontinuation of the diet. Around half of clinics give oral potassium citrate supplements empirically to all ketogenic diet patients, with some evidence that this reduces the incidence of stone formation. However, this has not been tested in a prospective controlled trial. Kidney stone formation (nephrolithiasis) is associated with the diet for four reasons:

- Excess calcium in the urine (hypercalciuria) occurs due to increased bone demineralisation with acidosis. Bones are mainly composed of calcium phosphate. The phosphate reacts with the acid, and the calcium is excreted by the kidneys.
- Hypocitraturia: the urine has an abnormally low concentration of citrate, which normally helps to dissolve free calcium.
- The urine has a low pH, which stops uric acid from dissolving, leading to crystals that act as a nidus for calcium stone formation.
- Many institutions traditionally restricted the water intake of patients on the diet to 80% of normal daily needs; this practice is no longer encouraged.

In adolescents and adults, common side effects reported include weight loss, constipation, dyslipidemia, and, in women, dysmenorrhea.

== Implementation ==
The ketogenic diet is a medical nutrition therapy that involves participants from various disciplines. Team members include a registered paediatric dietitian who coordinates the diet programme; a paediatric neurologist who is experienced in offering the ketogenic diet; and a registered nurse who is familiar with childhood epilepsy. Additional help may come from a medical social worker who works with the family and a pharmacist who can advise on the carbohydrate content of medicines. Lastly, the parents and other caregivers must be educated in many aspects of the diet for it to be safely implemented.

Implementing the diet can present difficulties for caregivers and the patient due to the time commitment involved in measuring and planning meals. Since any unplanned eating can potentially break the nutritional balance required, some people find the discipline needed to maintain the diet challenging and unpleasant. Some people terminate the diet or switch to a less demanding diet, like the modified Atkins diet or the low-glycaemic index treatment diet, because they find the difficulties too great.

=== Initiation ===
The Johns Hopkins Hospital protocol for initiating the classic ketogenic diet has been widely adopted. It involves a consultation with the patient and their caregivers and, later, a short hospital admission. Because of the risk of complications during ketogenic diet initiation, most centres begin the diet under close medical supervision in the hospital.

At the initial consultation, patients are screened for conditions that may contraindicate the diet. A dietary history is obtained and the parameters of the diet selected: the ketogenic ratio of fat to combined protein and carbohydrate, (Note: The ketogenic ratio k can be converted to the portion of calories from fat f using the Atwater coefficients of 9 and 4 kcal/g for fat and combined carbohydrate and water respectively. The equation is: f = (9 k)/(9 k + 4). For example, a 4:1 diet derives 90% of calories from fat. The inverse equation is k = (4 f)/(9 (1 - f)).) the calorie requirements and the fluid intake.

The day before admission to hospital, the proportion of carbohydrate in the diet may be decreased and the patient begins fasting after his or her evening meal. On admission, only calorie- and caffeine-free fluids are allowed until dinner, which consists of "eggnog" (Note: Ketogenic "eggnog" is used during induction and is a drink with the required ketogenic ratio. For example, a 4:1 ratio eggnog would contain 60 g of 36% heavy whipping cream, 25 g pasteurised raw egg, saccharin and vanilla flavour. This contains 245 kcal (1,025 kJ), 4 g protein, 2 g carbohydrate and 24 g fat (24:6 = 4:1). The eggnog may also be cooked to make a custard, or frozen to make ice cream.) restricted to one-third of the typical calories for a meal. The following breakfast and lunch are similar, and on the second day, the "eggnog" dinner is increased to two-thirds of a typical meal's caloric content. By the third day, dinner contains the full calorie quota and is a standard ketogenic meal (not "eggnog"). After a ketogenic breakfast on the fourth day, the patient is discharged. Where possible, the patient's current medicines are changed to carbohydrate-free formulations.

When in the hospital, glucose levels are checked several times daily and the patient is monitored for signs of symptomatic ketosis (which can be treated with a small quantity of orange juice). Lack of energy and lethargy are common, but disappear within two weeks. The parents attend classes over the first three full days, which cover nutrition, managing the diet, preparing meals, avoiding sugar, and handling illness. The level of parental education and commitment required is higher than with medication.

Variations on the Johns Hopkins protocol are common. The initiation can be performed using outpatient clinics rather than requiring a stay in hospital. Often, no initial fast is used (fasting increases the risk of acidosis, hypoglycaemia, and weight loss). Rather than increasing meal sizes over the three-day initiation, some institutions maintain meal size, but alter the ketogenic ratio from 2:1 to 4:1.

For patients who benefit, half achieve a seizure reduction within five days (if the diet starts with an initial fast of one to two days), three-quarters achieve a reduction within two weeks, and 90% achieve a reduction within 23 days. If the diet does not begin with a fast, the time for half of the patients to achieve an improvement is longer (two weeks), but the long-term seizure reduction rates are unaffected. Parents are encouraged to persist with the diet for at least three months before any final consideration is made regarding efficacy.

=== Maintenance ===
After initiation, the child regularly visits the hospital outpatient clinic where they are seen by the dietitian and neurologist, and various tests and examinations are performed. These are held every three months for the first year and then every six months thereafter. Infants under one year old are seen more frequently, with the initial visit held after just two to four weeks. A period of minor adjustments is necessary to ensure consistent ketosis is maintained and to better adapt the meal plans to the patient. This fine-tuning is typically done over the telephone with the hospital dietitian and includes changing the number of calories, altering the ketogenic ratio, or adding some MCT or coconut oils to a classic diet. Urinary ketone levels are checked daily to detect whether ketosis has been achieved and to confirm that the patient is following the diet, though the level of ketones does not correlate with an anticonvulsant effect. This is performed using ketone test strips containing nitroprusside, which change colour from buff-pink to maroon in the presence of acetoacetate (one of the three ketone bodies).

A short-lived increase in seizure frequency may occur during illness or if ketone levels fluctuate. The diet may be modified if seizure frequency remains high, or the child is losing weight. Loss of seizure-control may come from unexpected sources. Even "sugar-free" food can contain carbohydrates such as maltodextrin, sorbitol, starch, and fructose. The sorbitol content of suntan lotion and other skincare products may be high enough for some to be absorbed through the skin and thus negate ketosis.

=== Discontinuation ===
About 20% of children on the ketogenic diet achieve freedom from seizures, and many are able to reduce the use of anticonvulsant drugs or eliminate them altogether. Commonly, at around two years on the diet, or after six months of being seizure-free, the diet may be gradually discontinued over two or three months. This is done by lowering the ketogenic ratio until urinary ketosis is no longer detected, and then lifting all calorie restrictions. This timing and method of discontinuation mimics that of anticonvulsant drug therapy in children, where the child has become seizure-free. When the diet is required to treat certain metabolic diseases, the duration will be longer. The total diet duration is up to the treating ketogenic diet team and parents; durations up to 12 years have been studied and found beneficial.

Children who discontinue the diet after achieving seizure freedom have about a 20% risk of seizures returning. The length of time until recurrence is highly variable, but averages two years. This risk of recurrence compares with 10% for resective surgery (where part of the brain is removed) and 30–50% for anticonvulsant therapy. Of those who have a recurrence, just over half can regain freedom from seizures either with anticonvulsants or by returning to the ketogenic diet. Recurrence is more likely if, despite seizure freedom, an electroencephalogram shows epileptiform spikes, which indicate epileptic activity in the brain but are below the level that will cause a seizure. Recurrence is also likely if an MRI scan shows focal abnormalities (for example, as in children with tuberous sclerosis). Such children may remain on the diet longer than average, and children with tuberous sclerosis who achieve seizure freedom could remain on the ketogenic diet indefinitely.

== Variants ==
=== Classic ===
The ratio of calorific contributions from food components of four diets, by weight

The ketogenic diet is calculated by a dietitian for each child. Age, weight, activity levels, culture, and food preferences all affect the meal plan. First, the energy requirements are set at 80–90% of the recommended daily amounts (RDA) for the child's age (the high-fat diet requires less energy to process than a typical high-carbohydrate diet). Highly active children or those with muscle spasticity require more food energy than this; immobile children require less. The ketogenic ratio of the diet compares the weight of fat to the combined weight of carbohydrate and protein. This is typically 4:1, but children who are younger than 18 months, older than 12 years, or who are obese may be started on a 3:1 ratio. Fat is energy-rich, with 9 kcal/g (38 kJ/g) compared to 4 kcal/g (17 kJ/g) for carbohydrate or protein, so portions on the ketogenic diet are smaller than normal. The quantity of fat in the diet can be calculated from the overall energy requirements and the chosen ketogenic ratio. Next, the protein levels are set to allow for growth and body maintenance, and are around 1 g protein for each kg of body weight. Lastly, the amount of carbohydrate is set according to what allowance is left while maintaining the chosen ratio. Any carbohydrate in medications or supplements must be subtracted from this allowance. The total daily amount of fat, protein, and carbohydrate is then evenly divided across the meals.

A computer program such as KetoCalculator may be used to help generate recipes. The meals often have four components: heavy whipping cream, a protein-rich food (typically meat), a fruit or vegetable and a fat such as butter, vegetable oil, or mayonnaise. Only low-carbohydrate fruits and vegetables are allowed, which excludes bananas, potatoes, peas, and corn. Suitable fruits are divided into two groups based on the amount of carbohydrate they contain, and vegetables are similarly divided into two groups. Foods within each of these four groups may be freely substituted to allow for variation without needing to recalculate portion sizes. For example, cooked broccoli, Brussels sprouts, cauliflower, and green beans are all equivalent. Fresh, canned, or frozen foods are equivalent, but raw and cooked vegetables differ, and processed foods are an additional complication. Parents are required to be precise when measuring food quantities on an electronic scale accurate to 1 g. The child must eat the whole meal and cannot have extra portions; any snacks must be incorporated into the meal plan. A small amount of MCT oil may be used to help with constipation or to increase ketosis.

The classic ketogenic diet is not a balanced diet and only contains tiny portions of fresh fruit and vegetables, fortified cereals, and calcium-rich foods. In particular, the B vitamins, calcium, and vitamin D must be artificially supplemented. This is achieved by taking two sugar-free supplements designed for the patient's age: a multivitamin with minerals and calcium with vitamin D. A typical day of food for a child on a 4:1 ratio, 1,500 kcal (6,300 kJ) ketogenic diet comprises three small meals and three small snacks:

Sample meal plan for one day
Meal	Menu idea	Ingredients
Breakfast	Egg with bacon	28 g egg (about half an egg); 11 g bacon (about half a slice); 37 g of 36% heavy whipping cream; 23 g butter; 9 g slice of apple (about 5% of one apple)
Morning snack	Peanut butter ball (serving size: 0.5 ounce)	6 g peanut butter; 9 g butter
Lunch	Tuna salad	28 g tuna fish; 30 g mayonnaise; 10 g celery; 36 g of 36% heavy whipping cream; 15 g lettuce (one large leaf)
Afternoon snack	Keto yogurt (serving size: 1.3 ounces)	18 g of 36% heavy whipping cream; 17 g sour cream; 4 g strawberries (about half of one small strawberry); artificial sweetener
Dinner	Cheeseburger (no bun)	22 g minced (ground) beef; 10 g American cheese (half a slice of cheese); 26 g butter; 38 g of 36% heavy whipping cream; 10 g lettuce (one medium leaf); 11 g green beans (one spoonful)
Evening snack	Keto custard (serving size: 1.2 ounces)	25 g of 36% heavy whipping cream; 9 g egg (half a tablespoon); Pure, unsweetened vanilla flavouring

=== MCT oil ===
Normal dietary fat contains mostly long-chain triglycerides (LCTs). Medium-chain triglycerides (MCTs) are more ketogenic than LCTs because they generate more ketones per unit of energy when metabolised. Their use allows for a diet with a lower proportion of fat and a greater proportion of protein and carbohydrate, leading to more food choices and larger portion sizes. The original MCT diet developed by Peter Huttenlocher in the 1970s derived 60% of its calories from MCT oil. Consuming that quantity of MCT oil caused abdominal cramps, diarrhoea, and vomiting in some children. A figure of 45% is regarded as a balance between achieving good ketosis and minimising gastrointestinal complaints. The classical and modified MCT ketogenic diets are equally effective and differences in tolerability are not statistically significant. The MCT diet is less popular in the United States; MCT oil is more expensive than other dietary fats and is not covered by insurance companies.

=== Modified Atkins ===
First reported in 2003, the idea of using a form of the Atkins diet to treat epilepsy came about after parents and patients discovered that the induction phase of the Atkins diet controlled seizures. The ketogenic diet team at Johns Hopkins Hospital modified the Atkins diet by removing the aim of achieving weight loss, extending the induction phase indefinitely, and specifically encouraging fat consumption. Compared with the ketogenic diet, the modified Atkins diet (MAD) places no limit on calories or protein, and the lower overall ketogenic ratio (about 1:1) does not need to be consistently maintained by all meals of the day. The MAD does not begin with a fast or with a stay in hospital and requires less dietitian support than the ketogenic diet. Carbohydrates are initially limited to 10 g per day in children or 20 g per day in adults, and are increased to 20–30 g per day after a month or so, depending on the effect on seizure control or tolerance of the restrictions. Like the ketogenic diet, the MAD requires vitamin and mineral supplements and children are carefully and periodically monitored at outpatient clinics.

The modified Atkins diet reduces seizure frequency by more than 50% in 43% of patients who try it and by more than 90% in 27% of patients. While the strength of evidence is low for the modified Atkins, it has been known to show seizure freedom in some infants. Few adverse effects have been reported, though cholesterol is increased and the diet has not been studied long term. Although based on a smaller data set (126 adults and children from 11 studies over five centres), these results from 2009 compare favorably with the traditional ketogenic diet.

=== Low glycemic index treatment ===
The low glycemic index treatment (LGIT) is an attempt to achieve the stable blood glucose levels seen in children on the classic ketogenic diet while using a much less restrictive regimen. The hypothesis is that stable blood glucose may be one of the mechanisms of action involved in the ketogenic diet, which occurs because the absorption of the limited carbohydrates is slowed by the high fat content. Although it is also a high-fat diet (with approximately 60% calories from fat), the LGIT allows more carbohydrate than either the classic ketogenic diet or the modified Atkins diet, approximately 40–60 g per day. However, the types of carbohydrates consumed are restricted to those that have a glycaemic index lower than 50. Like the modified Atkins diet, the LGIT is initiated and maintained at outpatient clinics and does not require precise weighing of food or intensive dietitian support. Both are offered at most centres that run ketogenic diet programmes, and in some centres they are often the primary dietary therapy for adolescents.

Short-term results for the LGIT indicate that at one month approximately half of the patients experience a greater than 50% reduction in seizure frequency, with overall figures approaching that of the ketogenic diet. The data (coming from one centre's experience with 76 children up to the year 2009) also indicate fewer side effects than the ketogenic diet and that it is better tolerated, with more palatable meals.

=== Prescribed formulations ===
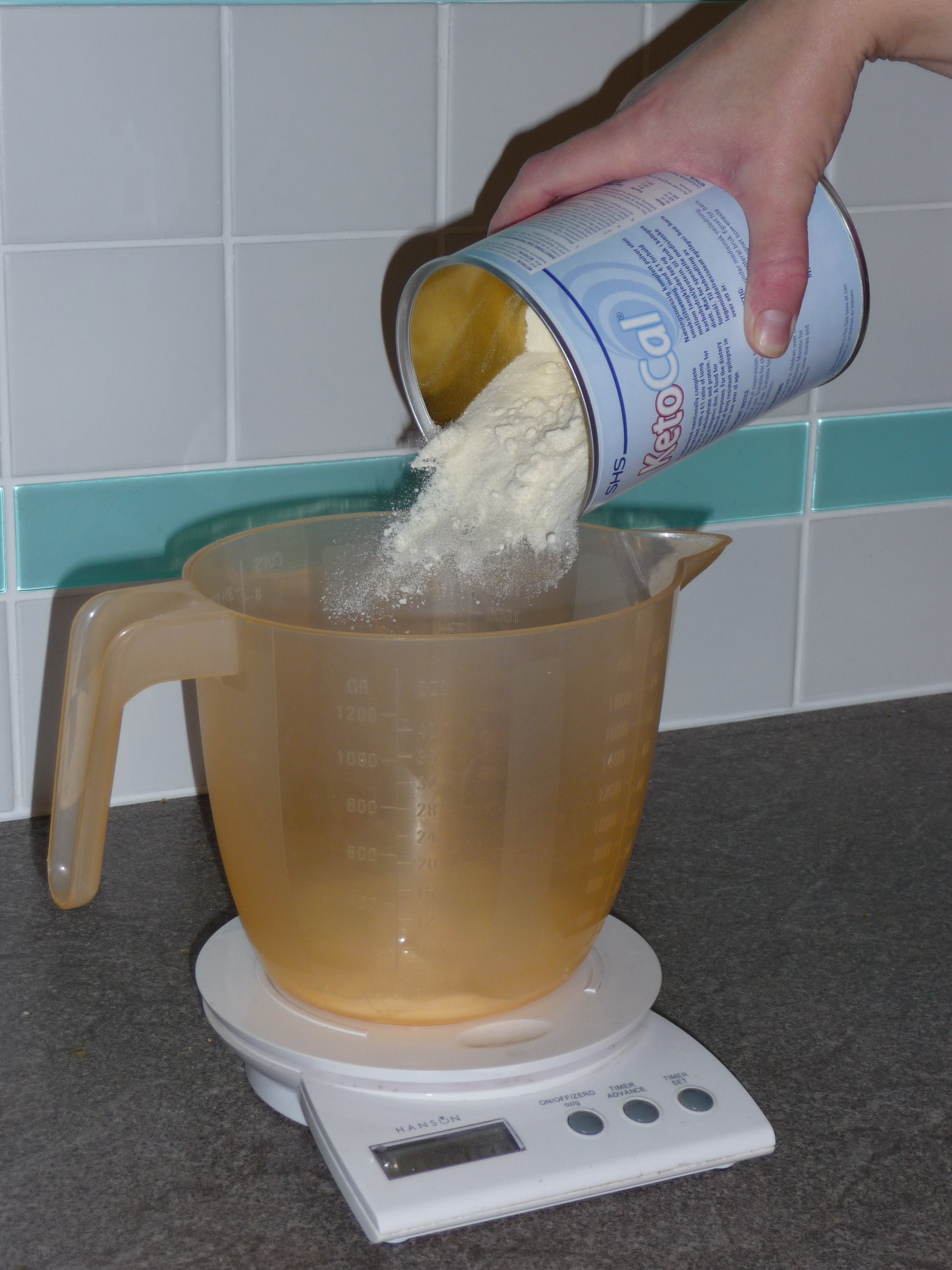
Measuring KetoCal – a powdered formula for administering the classic ketogenic diet

Infants and patients fed via a gastrostomy tube can also be given a ketogenic diet. Parents make up a prescribed powdered formula, such as KetoCal, into a liquid feed. Gastrostomy feeding avoids any issues with palatability, and bottle-fed infants readily accept the ketogenic formula. Some studies have found this liquid feed to be more efficacious and associated with lower total cholesterol than a solid ketogenic diet. KetoCal is a nutritionally complete food containing milk protein and is supplemented with amino acids, fat, carbohydrate, vitamins, minerals and trace elements. It is used to administer the 4:1 ratio classic ketogenic diet in children over one year. The formula is available in both 3:1 and 4:1 ratios, either unflavoured or in an artificially sweetened vanilla flavour and is suitable for tube or oral feeding. Other formula products include KetoVolve and Ketonia. Alternatively, a liquid ketogenic diet may be produced by combining Ross Carbohydrate Free soy formula with Microlipid and Polycose.

=== Worldwide ===
In theory, there are no restrictions on where the ketogenic diet might be used, and it can cost less than modern anticonvulsants. However, fasting and dietary changes are affected by religious and cultural issues. A culture where food is often prepared by grandparents or hired help means more people must be educated about the diet. When families dine together, sharing the same meal, it can be difficult to separate the child's meal. In many countries, food labelling is not mandatory, so calculating macronutrients such as fat, protein and carbohydrates can be difficult. In some countries, it may be hard to find sugar-free forms of medicines and supplements, to purchase an accurate electronic scale, or to afford MCT oils.

In Asia, the traditional diet includes rice and noodles as the main source of energy, making their elimination difficult. Therefore, the MCT-oil form of the diet, which allows more carbohydrate, has proved useful. In India, religious beliefs commonly affect the diet: for instance, Hindus consider cows sacred animals not to be killed and eaten, Islam forbids consumption of pork, and strict vegetarians of the Jain faith do not eat root vegetables. The Indian ketogenic diet is started without a fast due to cultural opposition towards fasting in children. The low-fat, high-carbohydrate nature of the normal Indian and Asian diet means that their ketogenic diets typically have a lower ketogenic ratio (1:1) than in America and Europe. However, they appear to be just as effective.

In many developing countries, the ketogenic diet is expensive because dairy fats and meat are more expensive than grain, fruit, and vegetables. The modified Atkins diet has been proposed as a lower-cost alternative for those countries; the slightly more expensive food bill can be offset by a reduction in pharmaceutical costs if the diet is successful. The modified Atkins diet is less complex to explain and prepare and requires less support from a dietitian.

== Mechanism of action ==
=== Seizure pathology ===
Ketone bodies

β-hydroxybutyrate

acetoacetic acid

acetone

The brain is composed of a network of neurons that transmit signals by propagating nerve impulses. The propagation of this impulse from one neuron to another is typically controlled by neurotransmitters, though there are also electrical pathways between some neurons. Neurotransmitters can inhibit impulse firing (primarily done by γ-aminobutyric acid, or GABA) or they can excite the neuron into firing (primarily done by glutamate). A neuron that releases inhibitory neurotransmitters from its terminals is called an inhibitory neuron, while one that releases excitatory neurotransmitters is an excitatory neuron. When the normal balance between inhibition and excitation is significantly disrupted in all or part of the brain, a seizure can occur. The GABA system is an important target for anticonvulsant drugs, since seizures may be discouraged by increasing GABA synthesis, decreasing its breakdown, or enhancing its effect on neurons.

The nerve impulse is characterised by a great influx of sodium ions through channels in the neuron's cell membrane followed by an efflux of potassium ions through other channels. The neuron is unable to fire again for a short time (known as the refractory period), which is mediated by another potassium channel. The flow through these ion channels is governed by a "gate" which is opened by either a voltage change or a chemical messenger known as a ligand (such as a neurotransmitter). These channels are another target for anticonvulsant drugs.

There are many ways in which epilepsy occurs. Examples of pathological physiology include: unusual excitatory connections within the neuronal network of the brain; abnormal neuron structure leading to altered current flow; decreased inhibitory neurotransmitter synthesis; ineffective receptors for inhibitory neurotransmitters; insufficient breakdown of excitatory neurotransmitters leading to excess; immature synapse development; and impaired function of ionic channels.

=== Seizure control ===
Although many hypotheses have been put forward to explain how the ketogenic diet works, it remains a mystery. Disproven hypotheses include systemic acidosis (high levels of acid in the blood), electrolyte changes and hypoglycaemia (low blood glucose). Although many biochemical changes are known to occur in the brain of a patient on the ketogenic diet, it is not known which of these has an anticonvulsant effect. The lack of understanding in this area is similar to the situation with many anticonvulsant drugs.

On the ketogenic diet, carbohydrates are restricted and so cannot provide for all the metabolic needs of the body. Instead, fatty acids are used as the major source of fuel. These are used through fatty-acid oxidation in the cell's mitochondria (the energy-producing parts of the cell). Humans can convert some amino acids into glucose by a process called gluconeogenesis, but cannot do this by using fatty acids. Since amino acids are needed to make proteins, which are essential for growth and repair of body tissues, these cannot be used only to produce glucose. This could pose a problem for the brain, since it is normally fuelled solely by glucose, and most fatty acids do not cross the blood–brain barrier. However, the liver can use long-chain fatty acids to synthesise the three ketone bodies, namely β-hydroxybutyrate, acetoacetate and acetone. These ketone bodies enter the brain and partially substitute for blood glucose as a source of energy.

The ketone bodies are possibly anticonvulsant; in animal models, acetoacetate and acetone protect against seizures. The ketogenic diet results in adaptive changes to brain energy metabolism that increase the energy reserves; ketone bodies are a more efficient fuel than glucose, and the number of mitochondria is increased. This may help the neurons to remain stable in the face of increased energy demand during a seizure, and may confer a neuroprotective effect.

The ketogenic diet has been studied in at least 14 rodent animal models of seizures. It is protective in many of these models and has a different protection profile than any known anticonvulsant. Conversely, fenofibrate, not used clinically as an antiepileptic, exhibits experimental anticonvulsant properties in adult rats comparable to the ketogenic diet. This, together with studies showing its efficacy in patients who have failed to achieve seizure control on half a dozen drugs, suggests a unique mechanism of action.

Anticonvulsants suppress epileptic seizures, but they neither cure nor prevent the development of seizure susceptibility. The development of epilepsy (epileptogenesis) is a process that is poorly understood. A few anticonvulsants (valproate, levetiracetam and benzodiazepines) have shown antiepileptogenic properties in animal models of epileptogenesis. However, no anticonvulsant has ever achieved this in a clinical trial in humans. The ketogenic diet has been found to have antiepileptogenic properties in rats.

== Other medical applications ==
The ketogenic diet has been studied for potential therapeutic use in various neurological disorders other than epilepsy: Alzheimer's disease (AD), amyotrophic lateral sclerosis (ALS), autism, headache, neurotrauma, pain, Parkinson's disease (PD) and sleep disorders. As of 2022 there is no clinical evidence that a ketogenic diet is effective to treat cancer.

== See also ==
- List of diets
- Very low-carbohydrate ketogenic diet
