= Mynie Gustav Peterman =

American paediatrician (1896–1971)

- Born: 5 March 1896; Merrill, Wisconsin
- Died: 14 October 1971 (aged 75); Milwaukee, Wisconsin
- Education: University of Wisconsin–Madison; Washington University in St. Louis; Washington University School of Medicine
- Occupation: Pediatrician
- Spouse: Mildred Mackenzie
- Children: 2

Mynie Gustav Peterman (5 March 1896 – 14 October 1971) was an American pediatrician known for formulating the classic ketogenic diet (CKD) to treat epilepsy in children.

== Biography ==
Peterman was born in Merrill, Wisconsin. He attended Merrill Public School (1901–1909), followed by Merrill High School (1909–1913). He obtained his Sc.B. from University of Wisconsin–Madison in 1918, A.M. from Washington University in St. Louis in 1919 and M.D. from Washington University School of Medicine in 1920. He was Assistant in Paediatrics at Mayo Clinic (1923–1925). He was Director of Paediatrics at Marquette University and Director of the Medical Laboratories of the Children's Hospital of Milwaukee (1925–1933).

During 1924–1925, Peterman reported results from the Mayo Clinic on the effectiveness of the ketogenic diet to treat epilepsy in children. Peterman's ketogenic diet was described as consisting of "one gram of protein per kilogram of body weight in children, 10–15 g of carbohydrate per day, and the remainder of the calories in fat". Peterman observed that excess ketosis could cause nausea and vomiting which could be relieved by his patients drinking orange juice. In 1925, Peterman reported that 95% of 37 young patients had improved seizure control on the ketogenic diet.

He was a consultant in paediatrics to the United States Public Health Service (1954–1964). Peterman was a member of the American Academy of Pediatrics and was a vice-president of the American chapter of the International League Against Epilepsy.

== Personal life ==
Peterman married Mildred Mackenzie on 29 September 1924, they had two children. He died on 14 October 1971 in Milwaukee.

== Selected publications ==
- The Ketogenic Diet in the Treatment of Epilepsy (1924)
- The Ketogenic Diet in Epilepsy (1925)
