= Why We Get Fat =

2010 book by Gary Taubes

Why We Get Fat And What To Do About It
- Author: Gary Taubes
- Language: English
- Subject: Obesity
- Publisher: Alfred A. Knopf
- Publication date: December 2010
- Publication place: United States
- Media type: Hardcover
- Pages: 272
- ISBN: 978-0-307-27270-6
- Dewey Decimal: 613.712
- Preceded by: Good Calories, Bad Calories

Why We Get Fat: And What To Do About It is a 2010 book by controversial journalist Gary Taubes. Following Taubes's 2007 book Good Calories, Bad Calories, in which he argues that the modern diet's inclusion of too many refined carbohydrates is a primary contributor to the obesity epidemic, he elaborates in Why We Get Fat on how according to him people can change their diets. Taubes is a controversial figure whose work often goes against accepted scientific, governmental, and popular tenets such as that obesity is caused by eating too much and exercising too little and that excessive consumption of fat, especially saturated fat in animal products, leads to cardiovascular disease.

Harriet A. Hall, has criticized Taubes for selectively quoting the meta-analysis, and, writing for Science-Based Medicine, states that although it is possible some of Taubes' hypotheses may be borne out by subsequent evidence, his idea that carbohydrate restriction can lead to weight loss independently of calorie restriction is "simply wrong".
