= Good Calories, Bad Calories =

2007 book by Gary Taubes

- Author: Gary Taubes
- Language: English
- Subject: Diet, obesity
- Publisher: Alfred A. Knopf
- Publication date: September 25, 2007
- Pages: 640
- ISBN: 978-1-4000-4078-0
- Followed by: Why We Get Fat: And What to Do About It

Good Calories, Bad Calories: Fats, Carbs, and the Controversial Science of Diet and Health (published as The Diet Delusion in the United Kingdom and Australia) is a 2007 book by science journalist Gary Taubes. Taubes argues that the last few decades of dietary advice promoting low-fat diets has been consistently incorrect. Taubes contends that carbohydrates, specifically refined carbohydrates like white flour, sugar, and starches, contribute to obesity, diabetes, heart disease, and other ailments. Taubes posits a causal link between carbohydrates and cancer, as well.

== Synopsis ==
Taubes points to biological, epidemiological, and anthropological evidence to back up his assertions. The human body secretes insulin in response to the consumption of carbohydrates in order to regulate blood sugar. This process, in turn, drives the body to store fat. Taubes elaborates by examining evidence of the effects of carbohydrates on tribes with a "traditional" diet high in meat or fat and low in carbohydrates. He finds that the introduction of refined carbohydrates in the diets in these cultures resulted in increased prominence of diseases of civilization such as obesity and heart disease.

== Reception ==
Reviews were mixed for Good Calories, Bad Calories. Physician Tony Miksanek, writing in the Chicago Sun-Times, calls the book "well-researched" and opines that Taubes’s conclusions are "somewhat startling yet surprisingly convincing." Journalism professor and food author Michael Pollan describes Good Calories, Bad Calories as "valuable" but believes that it "does not escape the confines of nutritionism."

New York Times medical reporter Gina Kolata concluded that she was ultimately "not convinced" by Taubes’s arguments, writing that "the problem with a book like this one, which goes on and on in great detail […] is that it can be hard to know what has been left out." Laura Vanderkam reviewed the book somewhat negatively in The American, the journal of the conservative think tank American Enterprise Institute. Vanderkam believes that the biggest problem with the book is that Taubes "fashions himself a lonely dissident", causing him to be "so meticulous that at times the book is unreadably weighty."

== See also ==
- A calorie is a calorie
- Empty calories
