= Robert Atkins (physician) =

American physician (1930–2003)

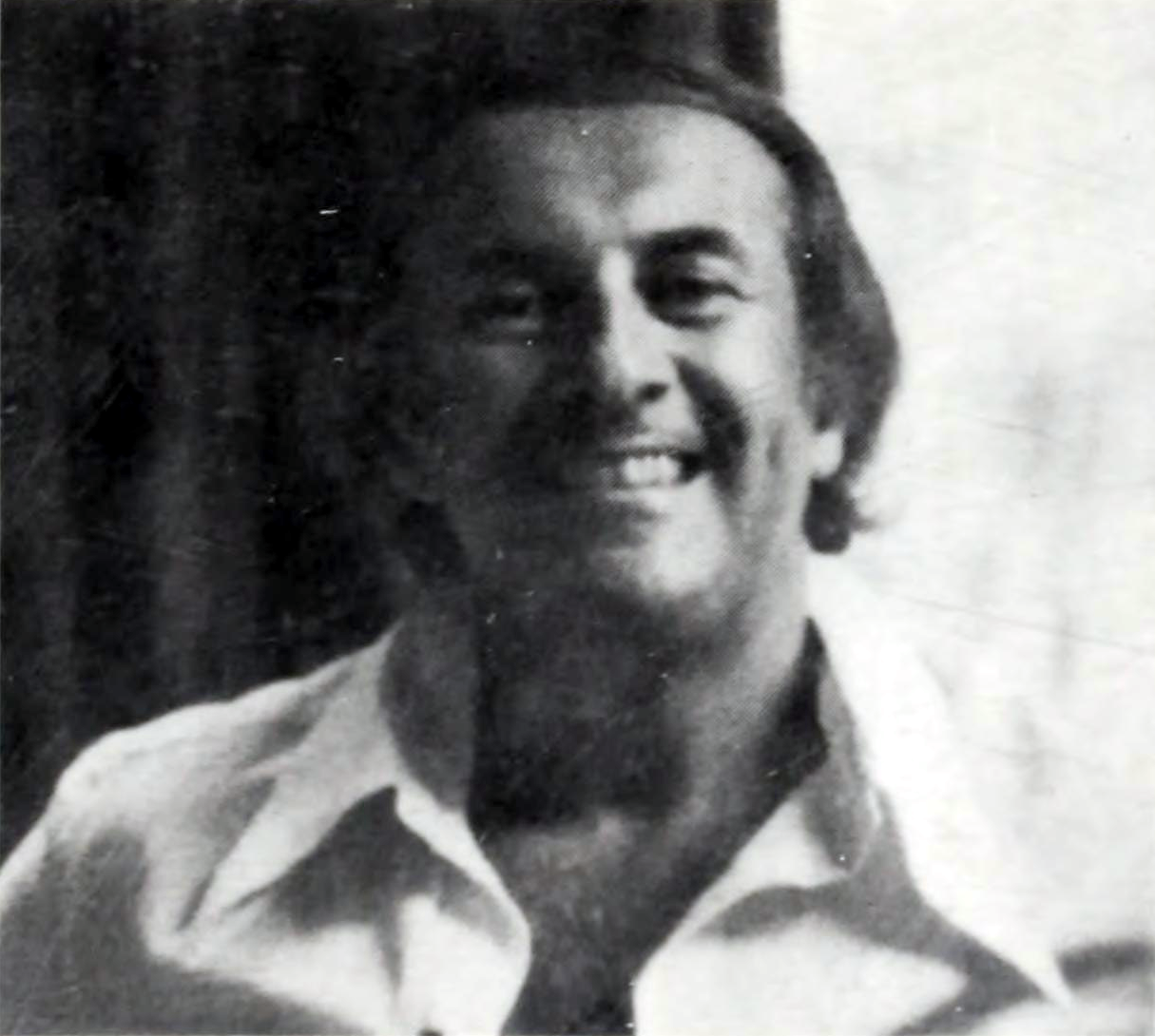
- Atkins, c. 1977
- Born: October 17, 1930; Columbus, Ohio, U.S.
- Died: April 17, 2003 (aged 72); New York City, U.S.
- Education: University of Michigan; Cornell University
- Occupation: Cardiologist
- Years active: 1959–2003
- Organization: Atkins Nutritionals
- Known for: Atkins diet
- Notable work: Dr. Atkins' Diet Revolution (1972); Dr. Atkins' Superenergy Diet (1977); Dr. Atkins' New Diet Revolution (1999)
- Spouse: Veronica Atkins (m. 1986)

Robert Coleman Atkins (October 17, 1930 – April 17, 2003) was an American physician and cardiologist, best known for the Atkins Diet, which requires close control of carbohydrate consumption and emphasizes protein and fat as the primary sources of dietary calories in addition to a controlled number of carbohydrates from vegetables.

The commercial success of Atkins' diet plan led Time to name the doctor a person of the year in 2002. The Atkins diet has been described as "one of the most popular fad diets in the United States".

== Early life and education ==
Atkins was born in 1930 in Columbus, Ohio, the son of Eugene and Norma (Tuckerman) Atkins. His family was Jewish. At the age of 12, his family moved to Dayton, Ohio, where his father owned several restaurants. As a young teen, Atkins held various jobs, including a position selling shoes at the age of 14 and a later gig on a local radio show. He attended Fairview High School in Dayton and, in 1947, finished second among 8,500 seniors on a statewide general scholarship test. Upon graduating from the University of Michigan in 1951, Atkins had thoughts of becoming a comedian and spent the summer as a waiter and entertainer at various resorts in the Adirondacks.

He eventually decided to pursue medicine, however, and received a medical degree from Cornell University Medical College in 1955. Atkins completed an internship under Dr. Emma C. Götz at Strong Hospital in Rochester, New York, and finished his residency in cardiology and internal medicine at hospitals affiliated with Columbia University.

== Career ==
Atkins specialized in cardiology and complementary medicine, and went on to open a private practice on the Upper East Side of New York City in 1959. His medical practice did not go well at first, and he began to put on weight and became depressed. After doing some research, he decided to pursue a low-carbohydrate approach published by Alfred W. Pennington, based on research Pennington did during World War II at DuPont. He began applying this approach in his practice, and began writing books about low-carb diets that became known as the Atkins diet, publishing his first book in 1972 and a few years later opening a complementary medicine center. He married his wife, Veronica, when he was 56.

== Diet ==
The Atkins Diet is a low-carbohydrate diet promoted by Atkins.

His success inspired others to generate low-carb diets, and many companies released low-carb diets and low-carb foods. After his death, the popularity of Atkins's diet waned, with other low-carb diets eroding its market share and questions being raised about its safety. In 2005, Atkins Nutritionals filed for bankruptcy. It was subsequently purchased by North Castle Partners in 2007 and switched its emphasis to low-carb snacks. In 2010, the company was acquired by Roark Capital Group.

== Death ==
In 2001, Atkins's coronary arteries were 30 to 40 percent blocked, according to Patrick Fratellone, his cardiologist and employee.

In 2002, Atkins went into cardiac arrest, leading many of his critics to point to this episode as proof of the inherent dangers in the consumption of high levels of saturated fat associated with the Atkins diet. In numerous interviews, however, Atkins stated that his cardiac arrest was not the result of poor diet, but was rather caused by a chronic infection.

On April 8, 2003, Atkins was admitted to Weill Cornell Medical Center, where he underwent surgery to remove a blood clot from his brain after having slipped on ice and hit his head, but fell into a coma. He died on April 17, at age 72.

After his death, his widow stated that Atkins's coronary-artery disease had progressed in the final years of his life with a new blockage, a procedure to remedy the blockage, and that he was taking heart-rhythm medication.

A report from the New York medical examiner's office was erroneously released to a doctor in Nebraska and allegedly leaked to the advocacy organization Physicians Committee for Responsible Medicine a year after his death. The report said that Atkins had a history of heart attack, congestive heart failure and hypertension, and that at the time of his death he weighed 258 pounds (117 kg). The organization suggested that fluid retention may have been responsible for some of Atkins' weight gain. According to Stuart Trager, chairman of the Atkins Physicians Council (a group of physicians who work as consultants to the Atkins organization), Atkins weighed 195 pounds when he was admitted to the hospital. Trager also said this report contained incomplete medical records and Atkins did not have a history of heart attacks; instead, according to Trager, Atkins had cardiomyopathy, a heart muscle disease that was probably caused by a virus, not his diet. His widow refused to allow an autopsy.

== Selected publications ==
- Atkins, Robert C. Dr. Atkins' Diet Revolution Bantam, 1972
- Atkins, Robert C. (1973). Dr. Atkins' Diet Revolution: The High Calorie Way to Stay Thin Forever. New York: Bantam Books. ISBN 9780553077315.
- Atkins, Robert C. Dr. Atkins' Diet Cookbook Bantam, 1974
- Atkins, Robert C. (2003). Dr Atkins' New Diet Cookbook: Mouthwatering Meals for One of the World's Most Effective Diets. London: Vermilion. ISBN 0-09-188946-4.
