= Low-carbohydrate diet =

Diets restricting carbohydrate consumption

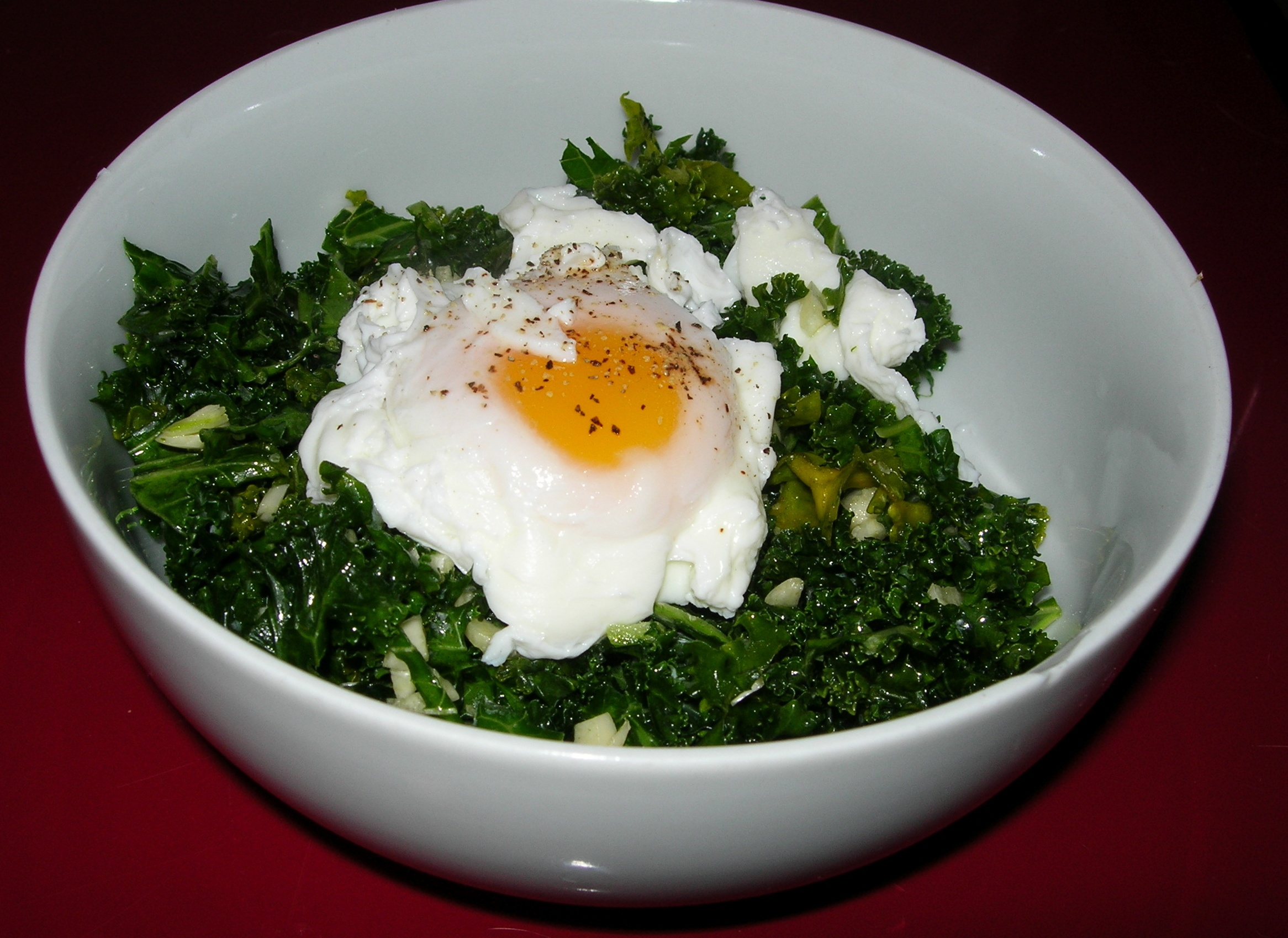
An example of a low-carbohydrate dish, cooked kale and poached eggs

Low-carbohydrate diets restrict carbohydrate consumption relative to the average diet. Foods high in carbohydrates (e.g., sugar, bread, pasta) are limited, and replaced with foods containing a higher percentage of fat and protein (e.g., meat, poultry, fish, shellfish, eggs, cheese, nuts, and seeds), as well as low carbohydrate foods (e.g. spinach, kale, chard, collards, and other fibrous vegetables).

There is a lack of standardization of how much carbohydrate low-carbohydrate diets must have, and this has complicated research. One definition, from the American Academy of Family Physicians, specifies low-carbohydrate diets as having less than 20% of calories from carbohydrates.

There is no good evidence that low-carbohydrate dieting in general confers any particular health benefits apart from weight loss, where low-carbohydrate diets achieve outcomes similar to other diets, as weight loss is mainly determined by calorie restriction and adherence.

One particular form of low-carbohydrate diet called the ketogenic diet was first established as a medical diet for treating epilepsy. It became a popular diet for weight loss through celebrity endorsement, but there is no evidence of any distinctive benefit for this purpose and the diet carries a risk of adverse effects, with the British Dietetic Association naming it one of the "top five worst celeb diets to avoid" in 2018.

== Definition and classification ==
=== Macronutrient ratios ===
The macronutrient ratios of low-carbohydrate diets are not standardized. As of 2018, the conflicting definitions of "low-carbohydrate" diets have complicated research into the subject.

The National Lipid Association Nutrition and Lifestyle Task Force define low-carbohydrate diets and those containing less than 25% of calories from carbohydrates, and very low carbohydrate diets being those containing less than 10% carbohydrates. A 2016 review of low-carbohydrate diets classified diets with 50 g of carbohydrate per day (less than 10% of total calories) as "very low" and diets with 40% of calories from carbohydrates as "mild" low-carbohydrate diets. The UK National Health Service recommend that "carbohydrates should be the body's main source of energy in a healthy, balanced diet."

=== Foodstuffs ===
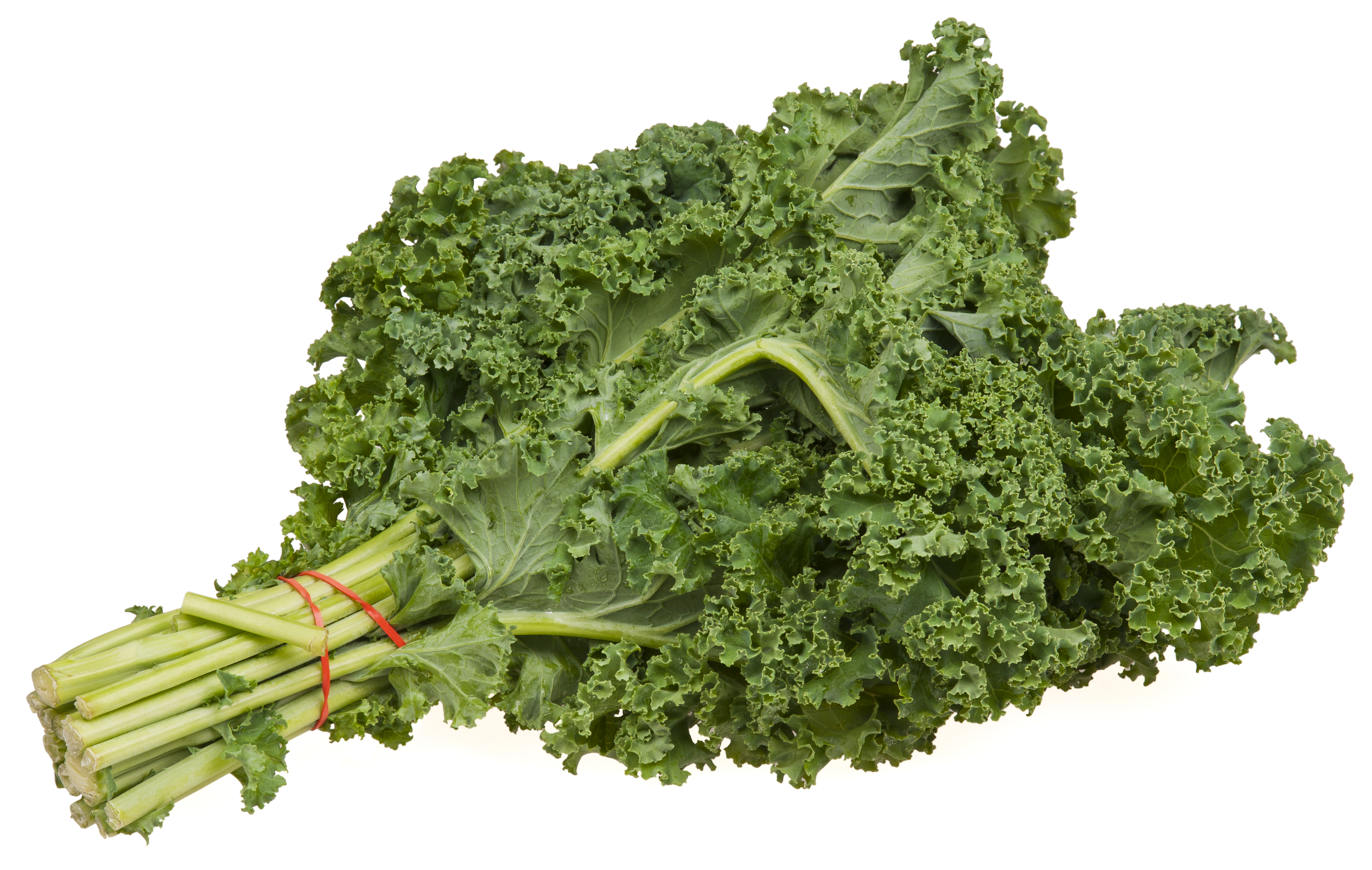
Like other leafy vegetables, curly kale is a food that is low in carbohydrates.

There is evidence that the quality, rather than the quantity, of carbohydrate in a diet is important for health, and that high-fiber slow-digesting carbohydrate-rich foods are healthful while highly refined and sugary foods are less so. A diet chosen to address health concerns should be tailored to the individual's specific needs.

Most vegetables are low- or moderate-carbohydrate foods (in some low-carbohydrate diets, fiber is excluded because it is not a nutritive carbohydrate). Some vegetables, such as potatoes, carrots, maize (corn) and rice are high in starch. Most low-carbohydrate diet plans accommodate vegetables such as broccoli, spinach, kale, lettuce, cucumbers, cauliflower, Brussels sprouts, peppers and most green-leafy vegetables.

== Authority opinions ==
The National Academy of Medicine recommends a daily average of 130 g of carbohydrates per day. The FAO and WHO similarly recommend that the majority of dietary energy come from carbohydrates. Low-carbohydrate diets are not an option recommended in the 2015–2020 edition of Dietary Guidelines for Americans, which instead recommends a low-fat diet.

Carbohydrate has been wrongly accused of being a uniquely "fattening" macronutrient, misleading many dieters into compromising the nutritiousness of their diet by eliminating carbohydrate-rich food. Low-carbohydrate diet proponents emphasize research saying that low-carbohydrate diets can initially cause slightly greater weight loss than a balanced diet, but any such advantage does not persist. In the long-term successful weight maintenance is determined by calorie intake, and not by macronutrient ratios.

The public has become confused by the way in which some diets, such as the Zone diet and the South Beach diet are promoted as "low-carbohydrate" when in fact they would more properly be termed "medium-carbohydrate" diets.

=== Carbohydrate-insulin hypothesis ===
Low-carbohydrate diet advocates including Gary Taubes and David Ludwig have proposed a "carbohydrate-insulin hypothesis" in which carbohydrates are said to be uniquely fattening because they raise insulin levels and cause fat to accumulate unduly. The hypothesis appears to run counter to known human biology whereby there is no good evidence of any such association between the actions of insulin, fat accumulation, and obesity. The hypothesis predicted that low-carbohydrate dieting would offer a "metabolic advantage" of increased energy expenditure equivalent to 400–600 kcal(kilocalorie)/day, in accord with the promise of the Atkins diet: a "high calorie way to stay thin forever".

With funding from the Laura and John Arnold Foundation, in 2012, Taubes co-founded the Nutrition Science Initiative (NuSI), with the aim of raising over $200 million to undertake a "Manhattan Project For Nutrition" and validate the hypothesis. Intermediate results, published in the American Journal of Clinical Nutrition did not provide convincing evidence of any advantage to a low-carbohydrate diet as compared to diets of other composition. This study revealed a marginal (~100 kcal/d) but statistically significant effect of the ketogenic diet to increase 24-hour energy expenditure measured in a respiratory chamber, but the effect waned over time. Ultimately a very low-calorie, ketogenic diet (of 5% carbohydrate) "was not associated with significant loss of fat mass" compared to a non-specialized diet with the same calories; there was no useful "metabolic advantage". In 2017, Kevin Hall, a National Institutes of Health researcher hired to assist with the project, wrote that the carbohydrate-insulin hypothesis had been falsified by experiment. Hall wrote "the rise in obesity prevalence may be primarily due to increased consumption of refined carbohydrates, but the mechanisms are likely to be quite different from those proposed by the carbohydrate–insulin model."

== Health aspects ==
=== Adherence ===
It has been repeatedly found that in the long-term, all diets with the same calorific value perform the same for weight loss, except for the one differentiating factor of how well people can faithfully follow the dietary programme. A study comparing groups taking low-fat, low-carbohydrate and Mediterranean diets found at six months the low-carbohydrate diet still had most people adhering to it, but thereafter the situation reversed: at two years the low-carbohydrate group had the highest incidence of lapses and dropouts. This may be due to the comparatively limited food choice of low-carbohydrate diets.

=== Body weight ===
In the short and medium term, people taking a low-carbohydrate diet can experience more weight loss than people taking a low-fat diet. The Endocrine Society stated that "when calorie intake is held constant ... body-fat accumulation does not appear to be affected by even very pronounced changes in the amount of fat vs. carbohydrate in the diet". People on such a diet have very slightly more weight loss initially, equivalent to approximately 100kcal/day, but that advantage diminishes over time and is ultimately insignificant. A Cochrane review from 2022 looked into longer periods of two years and found no benefit for adhering to a low-carbohydrate diet in comparison to balanced diets.

Much of the research comparing low-fat vs. low-carbohydrate dieting has been of poor quality and studies which reported large effects have garnered disproportionate attention in comparison to those which are methodologically sound. A 2018 review said "higher-quality meta-analyses reported little or no difference in weight loss between the two diets." Low-quality meta-analyses have tended to report favourably on the effect of low-carbohydrate diets: a systematic review reported that 8 out of 10 meta-analyses assessed whether weight loss outcomes could have been affected by publication bias, and 7 of them concluded positively. A 2017 review concluded that a variety of diets, including low-carbohydrate diets, achieve similar weight loss outcomes, which are mainly determined by calorie restriction and adherence rather than the type of diet.

=== Cardiovascular health ===
Eating a low-carbohydrate diet for less than two years was found to not worsen markers for cardiovascular health. However, following a low-carb diet for many years is associated with dying from heart disease. Low-carbohydrate diets in the long-term have detrimental effects on lipid parameters such as increase in total and LDL cholesterol. This is because most people on low-carbohydrate diets eat more animal source foods and less fruits and vegetables rich in fiber and micronutrients.

The American College of Cardiology recommends a clinician-patient discussion for people who want to go on a very low-carbohydrate diet. People on the diet should be informed that it may worsen LDL-C levels and cardiovascular health in the long-term. Those with atherosclerosis should be counseled to avoid low-carbohydrate diets.

=== Diabetes ===
There is limited evidence for the effectiveness of low-carbohydrate diets for people with type 1 diabetes. For certain individuals, it may be feasible to follow a low-carbohydrate regime combined with carefully managed insulin dosing. This can be hard to maintain and there are concerns about potential adverse health effects caused by the diet. In general, people with type 1 diabetes are advised to follow an individualized eating plan.

The proportion of carbohydrate in a diet is not linked to the risk of type 2 diabetes, although there is some evidence that diets containing certain high-carbohydrate items – such as sugar-sweetened drinks or white rice – are associated with an increased risk. Some evidence indicates that consuming fewer carbohydrate foods may reduce biomarkers of type 2 diabetes.

A 2019 consensus report on nutrition therapy for adults with diabetes and prediabetes the American Diabetes Association (ADA) states "Reducing overall carbohydrate intake for individuals with diabetes has demonstrated the most evidence for improving glycemia (blood sugar) and may be applied in a variety of eating patterns that meet individual needs and preferences." However, another source states that there is no good evidence that low-carbohydrate diets are better than a conventional healthy diet in which carbohydrates typically account for more than 40% of calories consumed. Low-carbohydrate dieting has no effect on the kidney function of people who have type 2 diabetes.

Limiting carbohydrate consumption generally results in improved glucose control, although without long-term weight loss. Low-carbohydrate diets can be useful to help people with type 2 diabetes lose weight, but "no single approach has been proven to be consistently superior." According to the ADA, people with diabetes should be "developing healthy eating patterns rather than focusing on individual macronutrients, micronutrients, or single foods." They recommended that the carbohydrates in a diet should come from "vegetables, legumes, fruits, dairy (milk and yogurt), and whole grains", while highly refined foods and sugary drinks should be avoided. For individuals with type 2 diabetes who can't meet the glycemic targets or where reducing anti-glycemic medications is a priority, the ADA says that low or very-low carbohydrate diets are a viable approach.

A 2021 umbrella review found that low-carbohydrate diets are no better for weight loss than higher-carbohydrate or low-fat diets in diabetic patients.

=== Exercise and fatigue ===
A low-carbohydrate diet has been found to reduce endurance capacity for intense exercise efforts, and depleted muscle glycogen following such efforts is only slowly replenished if a low-carbohydrate diet is taken. Inadequate carbohydrate intake during athletic training causes metabolic acidosis, which may be responsible for the impaired performance which has been observed.

=== Safety ===
A low-carbohydrate diet causes extensive metabolism of fatty acids, which are used by the liver to make ketone bodies, which provide energy to important organs, including the brain, heart, and kidneys, in a condition called ketosis. Ketosis can have other causes such as alcoholism and diabetes. Excessive accumulation of ketone bodies occurs when its production is greater than consumption, leading to ketoacidosis, a potentially life-threatening condition. Rarely, a low-carbohydrate ketogenic diet can also give rise to ketoacidosis, especially in patients with comorbid conditions. There are infrequent case reports of ketoacidosis occurring in people who follow low-carbohydrate diets such as the Atkins and South Beach diets. This has led to the suggestion that ketoacidosis should be considered a potential hazard of low-carbohydrate dieting.

High- and low-carbohydrate diets that are rich in animal-derived proteins and fats may be associated with increased mortality. Conversely, with plant-derived proteins and fats, there may be a decrease of mortality. A 2021 study from Japan looked at the long-term aspects of low-carb eating. The study included 90,171 participants with a median 17 years of follow-up. The study found that a high adherence to low-carb eating was associated with increased overall cancer risk. Looking at the diet composition the authors found that eating more animals foods was associated with an increased cancer risk while plant fat consumption was not.

As of 2018, research has paid insufficient attention to the potential adverse effects of carbohydrate restricted dieting, particularly for micronutrient sufficiency, bone health and cancer risk. One low-quality meta-analysis reported that adverse effects could include "constipation, headache, halitosis, muscle cramps and general weakness".

In a comprehensive systematic review of 2018, Churuangsuk and colleagues reported that other case reports give rise to concerns of other potential risks of low-carbohydrate dieting including hyperosmolar coma, Wernicke's encephalopathy, optic neuropathy from thiamine deficiency, acute coronary syndrome and anxiety disorder.

Significantly restricting the proportion of carbohydrate in diet risks causing malnutrition, and can make it difficult to get enough dietary fiber to stay healthy.

As of 2014, it appeared that with respect to the risk of death for people with cardiovascular disease, the kind of carbohydrates consumed are important; diets relatively higher in fiber and whole grains lead to reduced risk of death from cardiovascular disease compared to diets high in refined grains.

== History ==
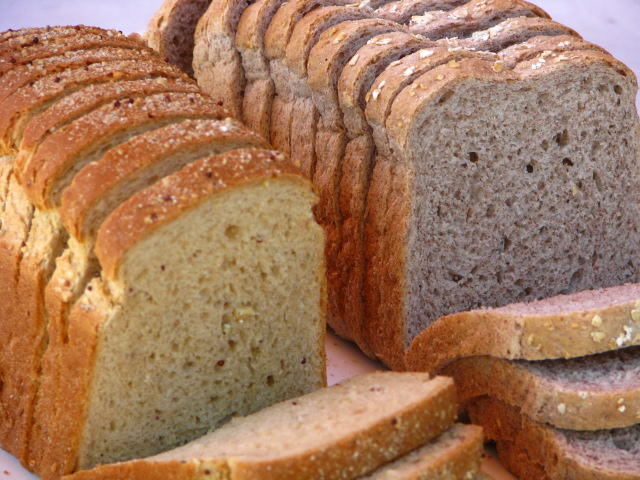
A low-carbohydrate diet restricts the amount of carbohydrate-rich foods – such as bread – in the diet.

=== First descriptions ===
In 1797, John Rollo reported on the results of treating two diabetic Army officers with a low-carbohydrate diet and medications. A very low-carbohydrate diet was the standard treatment for diabetes throughout the nineteenth century.

In 1825, Jean Brillat-Savarin promoted a low-carb diet in his book, The Physiology of Taste.

In 1863, William Banting, a formerly obese English undertaker and coffin maker, published "Letter on Corpulence Addressed to the Public", in which he described a diet for weight control giving up bread, butter, milk, sugar, beer, and potatoes. His booklet was widely read, so much so that some people used the term "Banting" for the activity now called "dieting".

Physicians who advocated a low-carbohydrate diet consisting of large amounts of animal fat and protein to treat diabetes in the late 1800s include James Lomax Bardsley, Apollinaire Bouchardat and Frederick William Pavy. Arnaldo Cantani isolated his diabetic patients in locked rooms and prescribed them an exclusive animal-based diet.

In the early 1900s Frederick Madison Allen developed a highly restrictive short term regime which was described by Walter R. Steiner at the 1916 annual convention of the Connecticut State Medical Society as The Starvation Treatment of Diabetes Mellitus. This diet was often administered in a hospital in order to better ensure compliance and safety.

=== Modern low-carbohydrate diets ===
Other low-carbohydrate diets in the 1960s included the Air Force diet, "Martinis & Whipped Cream" in 1966, and the Drinking Man's Diet. In 1972, Robert Atkins published Dr. Atkins' Diet Revolution, which advocated the low-carbohydrate diet he had successfully used in treating people in the 1960s. The book was a publishing success, but was widely criticized by the mainstream medical community as being dangerous and misleading, thereby limiting its appeal at the time.

The concept of the glycemic index was developed in 1981 by David Jenkins to account for variances in speed of digestion of different types of carbohydrates. This concept classifies foods according to the rapidity of their effect on blood sugar levels – with fast-digesting simple carbohydrates causing a sharper increase and slower-digesting complex carbohydrates, such as whole grains, a slower one. Jenkins's research laid the scientific groundwork for subsequent low-carbohydrate diets.

In 1992, Atkins published an update from his 1972 book, Dr. Atkins' New Diet Revolution, and other doctors began to publish books based on the same principles. During the late 1990s and early 2000s, low-carbohydrate diets became some of the most popular diets in the US. By some accounts, up to 18% of the population was using one type of low-carbohydrate diet or another at the peak of their popularity. Food manufacturers and restaurant chains noted the trend, as it affected their businesses. Parts of the mainstream medical community have denounced low-carbohydrate diets as being dangerous to health, such as the AHA in 2001 and the American Kidney Fund in 2002.

==== Ketogenic diet ====
The original ketogenic diet is a high-fat, low-carbohydrate diet developed in the 1920s and used to treat drug-resistant childhood epilepsy. Most epilepsy specialists order these children to eat 80% of the diet from fat by weight (90% of calories), plus carbohydrate-free vitamins and minerals to prevent vitamin deficiency. Although this extreme diet plan can be life-saving compared to the alternative, it is not a harmless diet. Children on this diet are at risk of broken bones, stunted growth, kidney stones, high cholesterol, and micronutrient deficiency.

The fad diet that adopted the same name is also a high-fat, low-carb diet, but with a lower fat content. A typical version of this keto diet for adults has about 50% of food by weight coming from fat (70% of calories). Proponents claim that it induces weight loss. The premise of the weight-loss ketogenic diet is that if the body is deprived of glucose obtained from carbohydrate foods, it will produce energy from stored fat. There are some different approaches to a keto diet, including:

- ketogenic diet (KD) – usually less than 50 grams of carbohydrates per day (assuming total intake of 2,000 calories).
- very low-calorie ketogenic diet (VLCKD) – same as KD, but limits total calories to a maximum of 800 calories per day.
- ketogenic low-carbohydrate high-fat diet (K-LCHF) – same as KD, with the additional restriction of 60 to 80% of calories coming from fat.
- modified Atkins diet (MAD) – fewer carbohydrates than K-LCHF (less than 10 grams per day), and encourages high-fat foods without specifying a specific required amount.

A very low calorie ketogenic diet that is high in fat but low in protein is an effective means for weight loss in those who are overweight or obese, yielding an average weight loss of 10 kg over four weeks, with maintenance of the weight loss for up to two years. However, concerns about serum sodium levels led researchers to propose the diet only be used in "selected" people, and under strict medical supervision.

In 2021 the American Heart Association issued a scientific statement on dietary guidance to improve cardiovascular health which noted that "there is insufficient evidence to support any existing popular or fad diets such as the ketogenic diet and intermittent fasting to promote heart health".

== See also ==
- Atkins diet – Low-carbohydrate fad diet devised by Robert Atkins
- Food pyramid
- Gluconeogenesis – Biosynthesis of glucose molecules
- Insulin resistance – Failure of cells to respond appropriately to insulin
- KE diet – Fad diet using a feeding tube
- Low-fiber/low-residue diet – Diet that limits stool
- Protein-sparing modified fast – Type of diet
- Richard K. Bernstein – American endocrinologist and author (1934–2025)
