= Bad Science (Taubes book) =

Book by Gary Taubes

Bad Science: The Short Life and Weird Times of Cold Fusion
- First edition cover
- Author: Gary Taubes
- Language: English
- Subject: Cold fusion
- Genre: Non-fiction
- Publisher: Random House
- Publication date: 1993-06-15
- Publication place: United States
- Media type: Print
- Pages: 503 pp.
- ISBN: 978-0-394-58456-0
- OCLC: 26811416
- Dewey Decimal: 539.7/64 20
- LC Class: QC791.775.C64 T38 1993

Bad Science: The Short Life and Weird Times of Cold Fusion is book of science history by Gary Taubes about the early years (1989–1991) of the cold fusion controversy.

== Overview ==
This text is not a scholarly work, but a popular retelling of the events, based on interviews with over 260 people. The book presents a timeline of the events, making the case that the cold fusion field has many examples of poorly performed science. The actions of Martin Fleischmann, Stanley Pons, and Steven E. Jones, the scientists who made the dramatic first claims of fusion, are described in rich detail. The book then shows the worldwide reaction and later disrepute of the cold fusion field, with Taubes placing himself in the side of "good science". Taubes says at the end that cold fusion had only demonstrated that research can continue even if the phenomenon doesn't actually exist, as long as there is funding available. Taubes had previously written an article for Science in which he insinuates that the cold fusion work of A&M University was fraudulent.

== Reception ==
The book received a positive review in American Journal of Physics. While observing that the book was "readable, suspenseful, and insightful", the reviewer criticized it for including too many footnotes (over 300), some of which were deemed unimportant.
