= Atkins diet =

Low-carbohydrate fad diet devised by Robert Atkins

Dr. Atkins' Diet Revolution, first published in 1972

The Atkins diet is a low-carbohydrate fad diet devised by Robert Atkins in the 1970s, marketed with claims that carbohydrate restriction is crucial to weight loss and that the diet offered "a high calorie way to stay thin forever".

The diet became popular in the early 2000s, with Atkins' book becoming one of the top 50 best-selling books in history, and as many as 1 in 11 North American adults claiming to be following it. Atkins died in 2003 and in 2005 Atkins Nutritionals, Inc. filed for bankruptcy following substantial financial losses.

There is no strong evidence of the diet's effectiveness in achieving durable weight loss; it promotes unlimited consumption of protein and saturated fat, and may increase the risk of heart disease.

== Effectiveness and risks ==
There is weak evidence that the Atkins diet is more effective than behavioral counseling for weight loss at 6-12 months. The Atkins diet led to 0.1% to 2.9% more weight loss at one year compared to control groups which received behavioral counseling for weight loss. As with other commercial weight loss programs, the effect size is smaller over longer periods. Low-carb dieters' initial advantage in weight loss is likely a result of increased water loss, and that after the initial period, low-carbohydrate diets produce similar fat loss to other diets with similar caloric intake.

Atkins did not publish clinical data on his patients and was criticized for making unsupported statements about health. Because of its high saturated fat content the Atkins diet may increase the risk of heart disease. A medical report issued by the New York medical examiner's office a year after the author's death showed that he had a history of congestive heart failure and hypertension. The Atkins diet has been criticized by the American Medical Association, American Dietetic Association and the American Heart Association as nutritionally unbalanced. In 2000, Journal of the American College of Nutrition conducted a study which determined that "the very high fats of Atkins diet: 60%–68%, around 26% of which are saturates, through shifting the metabolic pathway for energy production, deliver a strong boost to free radical production, thereby increasing oxidative stress on different organs".

=== Modified Atkins and epilepsy ===
Ketogenic diets are used to treat epilepsy in children, where there is some evidence it has a positive effect in reducing seizures. There is some evidence that adults, too, may experience seizure reduction derived from therapeutic ketogenic diets, and that a less strict regimen, such as a modified Atkins diet, is similarly effective.

== Description ==
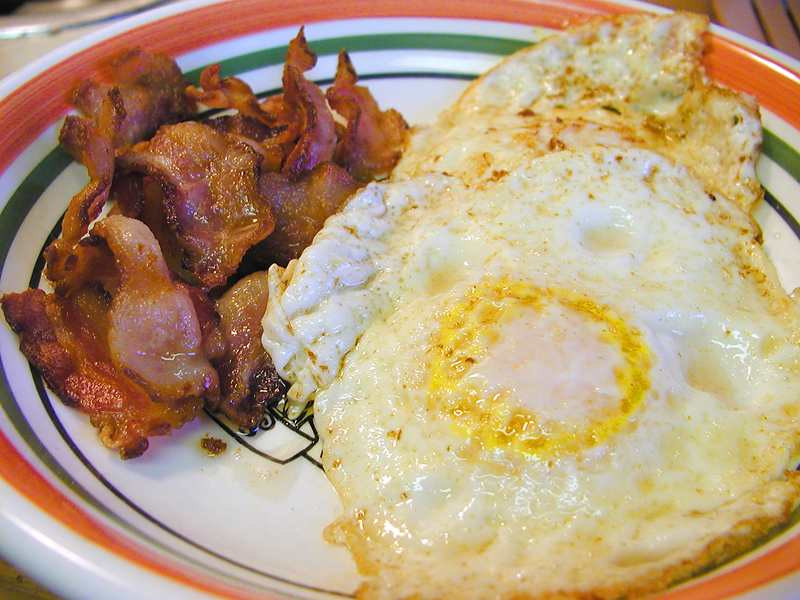
Bacon and eggs, foods compatible with the Atkins diet

The Atkins diet has been described as a low-carbohydrate, high-fat, high-protein fad diet. It promotes the consumption of meat, cheese, eggs and other high-fat foods such as butter, mayonnaise and sour cream in unlimited amounts whilst bread, cereal, pasta and other carbohydrates are forbidden. Atkins' book New Diet Revolution has sold 12 million copies. It has been described as "the bestselling fad-diet book ever written."

Preferred foods in all categories are whole, unprocessed foods with a low glycemic index, although restrictions for low glycemic carbohydrates (black rice, vegetables, etc.) are the same as those for high glycemic carbohydrates (sugar, white bread). Due to concerns from medical experts about the high-fat content of the diet, the Atkins Nutritionals company that market foods for the diet, recommends that no more than 20% of calories eaten while on the diet come from saturated fat.

== Proposed mechanism ==
The diet was inspired by a low-carbohydrate approach published by Alfred W. Pennington, based on research Pennington did during World War II at DuPont. The Atkins diet is promoted with claims that carbohydrate restriction is the "key" to weight loss.

In his early books such as Dr Atkins' New Diet Revolution, Atkins made the controversial argument that the low-carbohydrate diet produces a metabolic advantage because "burning fat takes more calories so you expend more calories"; the Atkins diet was claimed to be "a high calorie way to stay thin forever". He cited one study in which he estimated this advantage to be 950 calories (4.0 MJ) per day. A review study published in Lancet concluded that there was no such metabolic advantage and dieters were simply eating fewer calories. Astrup stated, "The monotony and simplicity of the diet could inhibit appetite and food intake." David L. Katz has characterized Atkins' claim as nonsense. The idea of "metabolic advantage" of low-carbohydrate dieting has been falsified by experiment in a study of people following restricted-carbohydrate dieting.

== Society and culture ==
=== Commercialization ===
Atkins Nutritionals was founded in 1989 by Atkins to promote the sale of Atkins-branded products. Following his death, waning popularity of the diet and a reduction in demand for Atkins products, Atkins Nutritionals, Inc. filed for Chapter 11 bankruptcy protection on July 31, 2005, citing losses of $340 million. It was subsequently purchased by North Castle Partners in 2007 and switched its emphasis to low-carb snacks. In 2010, the company was acquired by Roark Capital Group. In 2017, Roark Capital Group announced that it would merge Atkins Nutritionals with Conyers Park Acquisition Corp to form a public company called Simply Good Foods.

=== History ===
Atkins's ideas were first published in his 1972 book Dr. Atkins' Diet Revolution: The High Calorie Way to Stay Thin Forever.

The diet gained widespread popularity in 2003 and 2004. At the height of its popularity one in eleven North American adults claimed to be on a low-carb diet such as Atkins. This large following was blamed for large declines in the sales of carbohydrate-heavy foods like pasta and rice: sales were down 8.2 and 4.6 percent, respectively, in 2003. The diet's success was even blamed for a decline in Krispy Kreme sales. Trying to capitalize on the "low-carb craze", many companies released special product lines that were low in carbohydrates.

Around that time, the percentage of American adults on the diet declined to two percent and sales of Atkins brand products fell steeply in the second half of 2004.

A 2021 review article observed that, 50 years after it was first mooted, the Atkins diet was "coming back on the quackery scene again".

=== Cost ===
An analysis conducted by Forbes magazine found that the sample menu from the Atkins diet was one of the top five most expensive to eat, of the ten plans Forbes analyzed. This was due to the inclusion of recipes with some high-cost ingredients such as lobster tails which were put in the book to demonstrate the variety of foods which could be consumed on the diet. The analysis showed the median average cost of the ten diets was approximately 50% higher, and Atkins 80% higher, than the American national average. The Atkins diet was less expensive than the Jenny Craig diet and more expensive than Weight Watchers.

== Failed lawsuit ==
In 2004, Jody Gorran sued the estate of Robert Atkins and his company seeking $28,000 in damages. Gorran stated that he had followed the Atkins diet for two years and it raised his LDL-cholesterol so much that a major artery became clogged and he required an angioplasty and stent insertion to open it. On the Atkins diet he was eating large amounts of cheese which is high in saturated fat. Gorran commented that "the issue with the Atkins Diet was not so much that my cholesterol went up but it's the fact that the Atkins empire constantly stated that in the absence of refined carbohydrates, eating a great deal of saturated fat would not be a problem and that was a lie." The lawsuit was dismissed in 2007 as the Atkins diet consists of only "advice and ideas" that are protected by the First Amendment.

== See also ==
- Dukan Diet
- Ketogenic diet
- KE diet
- List of diets
- Online weight loss plans
- Protein poisoning
- PSMF diet
