= KE diet =

Fad diet using a feeding tube

KE diet, also known as feeding tube diet, is a fad diet in which an individual is fed a proprietary mixture through a feeding tube for a specific number of days. The dieter does not eat anything while on the diet. It has also been called the "Feeding Tube" diet in the United States.

The diet carries several serious medical risks and is not effective in achieving long-term weight loss.

== Nature of the diet ==
In the KE diet, a feeding tube is inserted through the nose of an individual down their oesophagus. At the other end of the tube is an electric pump. The only nourishment the patient receives is KE diet powder – an infusion of proteins, fats and micronutrients with no carbohydrates – mixed with water through the feeding tube. The patient only takes in about 800 calories a day, but the infusion is constant and the absence of carbohydrates curbs hunger. The dieter does not need hospitalization but requires doctor supervision and can carry the pump and liquid with them. The pump can be removed for up to one hour a day. While on the diet, the individual cannot eat anything and may only drink water, tea, coffee (with no milk, sugar or sweeteners) or sugar-free herb teas with the tube in. Laxatives may be given to dieters to ease constipation caused by the diet.

Practitioners screen their patients before administering the diet to them and monitor them with blood and urine tests during the diet. The diet does not stop someone from gaining weight in the future. Following the diet, the dieter has to continue a low-carb, high protein diet to keep the weight off.

== Safety and effectiveness ==
The Academy of Nutrition and Dietetics say it carries a number of serious risks including pulmonary aspiration and infection. Professor of nutritional science Laura Matarese has said "I don't know any reputable physician or any reputable health care practitioner who would say that this is a good idea."

People who lose weight via the KE diet are at risk of weight gain and binge eating once the diet ceases.

The reported side effects of the diet include constipation, bad breath, dizziness and lack of energy. If the process of ketosis is continued for long periods, it may start to eat away at muscles, which could be dangerous.

The diet could be dangerous for people with kidney disease and heart problems.

Critics of the diet claim it is unhealthy and may cause infection of the lung, kidney failure and erosion of tissues in the nose and throat. According to David L. Katz, another potential danger is the development of eating disorders in connection with crash dieting. Other claimed short-term risks involve insertion trauma, septum damage, perforated throat, lung damage, and gastrointestinal bleeding.

Critics of the diet also claim that weight loss with KE diet will not last. Following the diet it is up to the patient to keep the weight off.

== In the media ==
KE diet was introduced in the US by Oliver Di Pietro, a doctor by profession, in 2011. The diet gained considerable media attention when Jessica Schnaider, a woman who received the diet from Di Pietro before her wedding, was profiled in The New York Times. The diet was then profiled by the New York Times and Good Morning America. Subsequently, the diet was strongly criticized by the public. Medical field experts called the diet "unhealthy and dangerous." A headline on National Review's website read, "End of the World Watch: The 'Feeding Tube' Diet."

After interviewing Schnaider, Good Morning America reported that "more and more brides" were using the diet. Di Pietro was criticized for offering the diet. Michael Cirigliano, the medical expert for the television station Fox 29 in Philadelphia, dismissed the diet as "the most ludicrous, ridiculous thing I've ever heard of." He cited risks, like sinus infections.

== See also ==
- List of diets
