= Low-fat diet =

Diet that contains limited amounts of fat

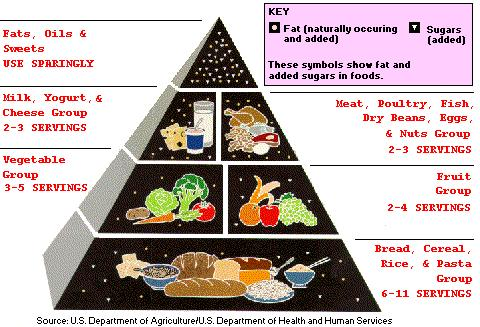
USDA's original Food Pyramid

MyPlate replaced the Food Pyramid since 2011

A low-fat diet is one that restricts fat, and often saturated fat and cholesterol as well. Low-fat diets are intended to reduce the occurrence of conditions such as heart disease and obesity. For weight loss, they perform similarly to a low-carbohydrate diet, since macronutrient composition does not determine weight loss success. Fat provides nine calories per gram while carbohydrates and protein each provide four calories per gram. The Institute of Medicine recommends limiting fat intake to 35% of total calories to control saturated fat intake.

== Composition ==
According to the National Academies Press, a high-fat diet can contain "unacceptably high" amounts of saturated fat, even if saturated fats from animal products and tropical oils are avoided. This is because all fats contain some saturated fatty acids. For example, if a person chose fats with only 20% saturated fatty acids, setting fat intake at 35% of total calories would mean that 7% of calories would come from saturated fat. For this reason, the Institute of Medicine recommends consuming no more than 35% of calories from fat.

== Health effects ==
=== Body weight ===
Studies have shown that the effectiveness of low-fat diets for weight loss is broadly similar to that of low-carbohydrate diets in the long-term. A scientific panel for the Endocrine Society stated that "when calorie intake is held constant [...] body-fat accumulation does not appear to be affected by even very pronounced changes in the amount of fat vs carbohydrate in the diet."

=== Cardiovascular health ===
Low-fat diets have been promoted for the prevention of heart disease. Lowering fat intake from 35 to 40% of total calories to 15–20% of total calories has been shown to decrease total and LDL cholesterol by 10 to 20%; however, most of this decrease is due to a reduction in saturated fat intake. Saturated fat has been shown to raise total and LDL cholesterol in a large number of studies and has also been correlated with a higher risk of heart disease.

A 2013 meta-analysis of low- and high-fat diets showed low-fat diets decreased total cholesterol and LDL, but these decreases were not found when considering low-calorie diets. It also showed HDL increases and triglyceride decreases in high-fat diets. Furthermore, lower total cholesterol was associated with lower intake of saturated fat and higher intake of polyunsaturated fat, HDL increases were associated with high monounsaturated fat intake and triglycerides were associated with high carbohydrate intake. Decrease in saturated fat intake was only marginally related to decrease in LDL cholesterol. The meta-analysis concluded that neither high-fat nor low-fat diets could be unequivocally recommended.

=== Testosterone ===
There is limited evidence that low-fat diets compared to high-fat diets, decreased men's total and free testosterone levels. The decrease in testosterone on low-fat diets is thought to be due to a decrease in testicular testosterone synthesis, since both urinary testosterone and dihydrotestosterone also decrease on low-fat diets. This indicates reduced androgen production, rather than increased androgen excretion on low-fat diets.

== See also ==
- List of diets
