= Montignac =

Montignac may refer to:

== Surname ==
- Michel Montignac (1944–2010), French dietician, best known for his Montignac diet

== Places in France ==
- Montignac, Gironde, in the Gironde department
- Montignac, Hautes-Pyrénées, in the Hautes-Pyrénées department
- Montignac-Charente, in the Charente department
- Montignac-de-Lauzun, in the Lot-et-Garonne department
- Montignac-Lascaux, in the Dordogne department
- Montignac-le-Coq, in the Charente department
- Montignac-Toupinerie, in the Lot-et-Garonne department

== See also ==
- Montignac diet, a weight-loss diet created by Michel Montignac
