= Bernac =

Bernac is the name or part of the name of the following communes in France:

- Bernac, Charente, in the Charente department
- Bernac, Tarn, in the Tarn department
- Bernac-Debat, in the Hautes-Pyrénées department
- Bernac-Dessus, in the Hautes-Pyrénées department
- Loubès-Bernac, in the Lot-et-Garonne department

== People with the surname Bernac ==
- Pierre Bernac, French baritone (1899-1979)
