= Montignac diet =

Type of diet

The Montignac diet is a high-protein low-carbohydrate fad diet that was popular in the 1990s, mainly in Europe. It was invented by Frenchman Michel Montignac (1944–2010), an international executive for the pharmaceutical industry, who, like his father, was overweight in his youth. His method is aimed at people wishing to lose weight efficiently and lastingly, reduce risks of heart failure, and prevent diabetes.

The Montignac diet is based on the glycemic index (GI) and forbids high‐carbohydrate foods that stimulate secretion of insulin.

== Principle ==
Carbohydrate-rich foods are classified according to their glycemic index (GI), a ranking system for carbohydrates based on their effect on blood glucose levels after meals. High-GI carbohydrates are considered "bad" (with the exception of those foodstuffs like carrots that, even though they have high GIs, have a quite low carbohydrate content and should not significantly affect blood sugar levels, also called low glycemic load or low GL). The glycemic index was devised by Jenkins et al. at the University of Toronto as a way of conveniently classifying foods according to the way they affected blood sugar and was developed for diabetics suffering from diabetes mellitus. Montignac was the first to recommend using the glycemic index as a slimming diet rather than a way of managing blood sugar levels, and recommendations to avoid sharp increases in glucose blood sugar levels (as opposed to gradual increases) as a strategy for anyone to lose weight rather than a strategy for diabetics to stabilize blood sugar levels.

Montignac's diet was followed by the South Beach Diet that also used the GI principle, and Michael Mosley's 5:2 diet incorporates a recommendation to select foods with a low glycemic index or glycemic load.

"Bad carbohydrates", such as those in sweets, potatoes, rice and white bread, may not be taken together with fats, especially during Phase 1 of the Method. According to Montignac's theory, these combinations will lead to the fats in the food being stored as body fat. (Some kinds of pasta, such as "al dente" durum wheat spaghetti; some varieties of rice, such as long-grain basmati; whole grains; and foods rich in fiber, have a lower GI.)

Another aspect of the diet regards the choice of fats: the desirability of fatty foods depends on the nature of their fatty acids: polyunsaturated omega 3 acids (fish fat) as well as monounsaturated fatty acids (olive oil) are the best choice, while saturated fatty acids (butter and animal fat) should be restricted. Fried foods and butter used in cooking should be avoided.

The Montignac Method is divided into two phases.

Phase I: the weight-losing phase. This phase consists chiefly of eating the appropriate carbs, namely those with glycemic index ranked at 35 or lower (pure glucose is 100 by definition). A higher protein intake, such as 1.3–1.5 grams per kg of body weight, especially from fish and legumes, can help weight loss, but people with kidney disease should ask their doctor.

Phase II: stabilization and prevention phase. Montignac states on his website that we "can even enhance our ability to choose by applying a new concept, the glycemic outcome (synthesis between glycemic index and pure carbohydrate content) and the blood sugar levels which result from the meals. Under these conditions, we can eat whatever carbohydrate we want, even those with high glycemic indexes".

In his books, Montignac also provides a good number of filling French and Mediterranean style recipes. The pleasure of food and the feeling of fullness are key concepts in the Method as they are believed to help dieters stick to the rules in the long term and not go on a binge. Montignac also recommends that dieters should never miss a meal, and have between-meal snacks if that helps to eat less at meals.

== Scientific studies ==
Montignac's theory is disputed by nutrition experts who claim that any calorie intake that exceeds the amount that the body needs will be converted into body fat. It has been argued that Montignac confuses the direction of causality between obesity and hyperinsulinemia and that the weight loss is simply due to the hypocaloric character of the diet.

Kathleen Melanson and Johanna Dwyer in the Handbook of Obesity Treatment have noted that:

Another part of the Montignac plan is based on the GI, listing "bad" and "good" carbohydrates. Any food with GI above 50 is forbidden. This is arbitrary, because many GI lists have very different values for the same foods. Thus a food may be "good" according to some lists and "bad" according to others. Furthermore, many of the foods on the "bad" lists are nourishing foods that are rich in vitamins, minerals and fiber... Lists of "bad" and "good" foods are warning signs that a diet is unreasonable, especially if fruits and vegetables are considered "bad" foods.

The scientific literature refutes the hypotheses of Montignac regarding the metabolic effects of carbohydrates and fatty acids. Critics also point out that the Glycemic Index is not easy to use, as it depends on the exact variety of the food; how it was cooked; combinations with other foods in the same meal, and so on. Despite these scientific doubts, there are other serious scientific studies which endorse this method. Although a review concluded that low glycemic index diets do not achieve greater weight loss than low-fat diets, the former might lead to greater reductions in cardiovascular risk factors.

== Popularity ==
Montignac sold 15 million books about his diet, and his method has been made famous by the celebrities who adopted it, including Gérard Depardieu and others.

== See also ==
- Diabetic diet
- Glycemic efficacy
- Glycemic index#Weight control
- Glycemic load
- Insulin index
- List of diets
- Low glycemic index diet
