= Debat =

Debat or Débat may refer to:

Places:

- Barbazan-Debat, commune in the Hautes-Pyrénées department in southwestern France
- Bernac-Debat, commune in the Hautes-Pyrénées department in southwestern France
- Bernadets-Debat, commune in the Hautes-Pyrénées department in southwestern France
- Cazaux-Debat, commune in the Hautes-Pyrénées department in southwestern France
- Chelle-Debat, commune in the Hautes-Pyrénées department in southwestern France
- Loussous-Débat, commune in the Gers department in southwestern France
- Oléac-Debat, commune in the Hautes-Pyrénées department in southwestern France
- Ponson-Debat-Pouts, commune in the Pyrénées-Atlantiques department in southwestern France

People:

- Alexis Debat (born 1977), French commentator on terrorism and national security, based in Washington D.C., USA
- Alphonse Massamba-Débat (1921–1977), political figure of the Republic of the Congo
  - Stade Alphonse Massemba-Débat in Brazzaville is the national stadium of the Republic of the Congo
- Claude Bérit-Débat (born 1946), member of the Senate of France, representing the Dordogne department

== See also ==
- Debate
