= Allier (disambiguation) =

Allier is a department in south-central France.

Allier may also refer to:

== Places ==
- Allier (river), in France
- Allier, Hautes-Pyrénées, a commune of the Hautes-Pyrénées department, in southwestern France

== People ==
- Carolina Allier, Mexican badminton player
- Thomas Allier (born 1975), French BMX rider
