= Château de Horgues =

Castle in Occitania, France

Coordinates: 43.1888°N 0.09°E

The Château de Horgues is a 15th-century castle, converted in later centuries into a modern residence, in the commune of Horgues in the Hautes-Pyrénées département of France.

== History ==
The castle is known to have existed in 1560. During the French Wars of Religion, the castle's owner, Captain Horgues, Count of Lavedan, fought the Calvinist troops of Jeanne d'Albret. After the unsuccessful defence of the town of Tarbes, in 1569, Forgues, his wife and the townspeople were captured. As a brave warrior, he was allowed to return with his wife, without ransom, to his castle.

The structure has been altered several times, in the 16th, 18th and 19 centuries. The south east tower was added in the 18th century but the east facade is entirely original.

== Description ==
The four sides of the structure all appear different. The south side is flanked by two round tours with powerful buttresses and has windowed three storeys. The eastern façade has a wooden gallery leaning against the tower and overlooking the moulded window frames. The north facade has a brick watchtower resting on a bed of stones. The west facade and the square south-west tower have few openings. The interior is decorated with Empire wallpapers. The woodwork is original.

The Château de Horgues is privately owned and not open to the public. It has been listed since 1977 as a monument historique by the French Ministry of Culture.

== See also ==
- List of castles in France
