= Glycemic load =

Estimate of how a quantity of food will raise a blood glucose level

The glycemic load (GL) of food is a number that estimates how much the food will raise a person's blood glucose level after it is eaten. One unit of glycemic load approximates the effect of eating one gram of glucose. Glycemic load accounts for how much carbohydrate is in the food and how much each gram of carbohydrate in the food raises blood glucose levels. Glycemic load is based on the glycemic index (GI), and is calculated by multiplying the weight of available carbohydrate in the food (in grams) by the food's glycemic index, and then dividing by 100.

== Description ==
Glycemic load estimates the impact of carbohydrate intake using the glycemic index while taking into account the amount of carbohydrates that are eaten in a serving. GL is a GI-weighted measure of carbohydrate content. For instance, watermelon has a high GI, but a typical serving of watermelon does not contain many carbohydrates, so the glycemic load of eating it is low. Whereas glycemic index is defined for each type of food, glycemic load can be calculated for any size serving of a food, an entire meal, or an entire day's meals.

Glycemic load of a 100 g serving of food can be calculated as its carbohydrate content measured in grams (g), multiplied by the food's GI, and divided by 100. For example, watermelon has a GI of 72. A 100 g serving of watermelon has 5 g of available carbohydrates (it contains a lot of water), making the calculation (5 × 72)/100=3.6, so the GL is 3.6. A food with a GI of 90 and 8 g of available carbohydrates has a GL of 7.2 (8 × 90/100=7.2), while a food with a GI of just 6 and with 120 g of carbohydrate also has a GL of 7.2 (120 × 6/100=7.2).

For one serving of a food, a GL of 20 or greater is considered high, a GL of 11–19 is considered medium, and a GL of 10 or less is considered low. Foods that have a low GL in a typical serving size almost always have a low GI. Foods with an intermediate or high GL in a typical serving size range from a very low to very high GI.

One 2007 study has questioned the value of using glycemic load as a basis for weight-loss programmes. Das et al. conducted a study on 36 healthy, overweight adults, using a randomised test to measure the efficacy of two diets, one with a high glycemic load and one with a low GL. The study concluded that there is no statistically significant difference between the outcome of the two diets.

Glycemic load appears to be a significant factor in dietary programs targeting metabolic syndrome, insulin resistance, and weight loss; studies have shown that sustained spikes in blood sugar and insulin levels may lead to increased diabetes risk. The Shanghai Women's Health Study concluded that women whose diets had the highest glycemic index were 21 percent more likely to develop type 2 diabetes than women whose diets had the lowest glycemic index. Similar findings were reported in the Black Women's Health Study. A diet program that manages the glycemic load aims to avoid sustained blood-sugar spikes and can help avoid onset of type 2 diabetes. For diabetics, glycemic load is a highly recommended tool for managing blood sugar.

The data on GI and GL listed in this article is from the University of Sydney (Human Nutrition Unit) GI database.

The GI was invented in 1981 by Dr Thomas Wolever and Dr David Jenkins at the University of Toronto and is a measure of how quickly a food containing 25 or 50 g of carbohydrate raises blood-glucose levels. Because some foods typically have a low carbohydrate content, Harvard researchers created the GL, which takes into account the amount of carbohydrates in a given serving of a food and so provides a more useful measure. Liu et al. were the first to show that based on their calculation, the glycemic load of a specific food—calculated as the product of that food's carbohydrate content and its glycemic index value—has direct physiologic meaning in that each unit can be interpreted as the equivalent of 1 g carbohydrate from white bread (or glucose depending on the reference used in determining the glycemic index). It became immediately apparent that such direct physiological quantification of glycemic load would allow patients with diabetes to do "glycemic load" counting as opposed to the conventional "carbohydrate counting" for monitoring the glycemic effect of foods. The concept of glycemic load addresses the concern about rating foods as good or bad solely on the basis of their glycemic index. For example, although the glycemic index for carrots is 19 raw and 47 boiled, the glycemic load for one serving of carrots is small because the amount of carbohydrate in one serving of carrots is minimal (≈7 g carbohydrate). Indeed, ≈700 g carrots (which provides 50 g carbohydrate) must be eaten to produce an incremental glucose response of bread (50-95).

== List of foods and their glycemic load for a 100 g serving ==
All numeric values provided in the table are approximate. Note that 100 g may not represent a typical serving size. For example, a typical rice serving would be 150–200 g with a corresponding increase in GL, whilst a banana may weigh more than 100 g. Reference tables which give GL by typical serving size will show different values.

Food	Glycemic index	Carbohydrate content (g)	Glycemic Load (100 g serving)	Insulin index
Baguette, white, plain	95 (high)	50	48	—
Banana, Mean of 10 studies	52 (low) – 55 ± 7 (low–medium)	20	10 – 11 ± 1	57 ± 4
Cabbage	10 (low)	5.9	<1	—
Carrots, mean of 4 studies	47 (low)	8	<4	—
Corn tortilla	52 (low)	48	25	—
Potato, mean of 5 studies	50 (low) – 99 ± 25 (high)	19	9 – 18 ± 5	85 ± 8
Rice, boiled white, mean of 12 studies	64 – 93	25	16 – 23	40 ± 10 – 55 ± 8 – 67 ± 15
Watermelon	72 (high)	5	<4	—
Apple	38	47	4	
Apricot	57	31	4	
Cherry, fresh	22	48	3	

== See also ==
- Diabetic diet
- Disposition index
- Glycemic index
- Glycemic efficacy
- Low glycemic index diet
- Montignac diet
- Overall nutritional quality index
