= Glycemic index =

Number assigned to food

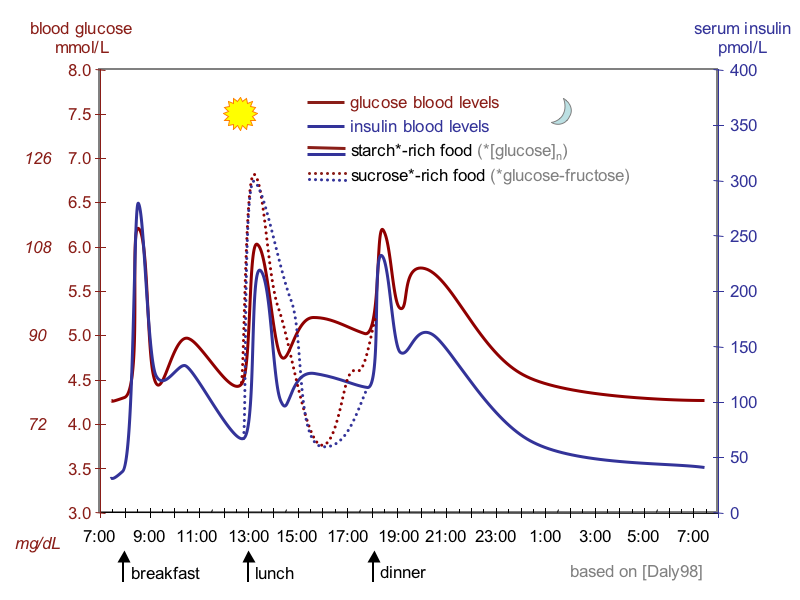
Graph depicting blood sugar change during a day with three meals.

The glycemic (glycaemic) index (GI; /ɡlaɪˈsiːmɪk/) is a number from 0 to 100 assigned to a food, with pure glucose arbitrarily given the value of 100, which represents the relative rise in the blood glucose level two hours after consuming that food. The GI of a specific food depends primarily on the type of carbohydrate it contains, but is also affected by the amount of entrapment of the carbohydrate molecules within the food, the fat, protein content of the food, the moisture and fiber content, the amount of organic acids (or their salts) (e.g., citric or acetic acid), and the method of cooking. GI tables, which list many types of foods and their GIs, are available. A food is considered to have a low GI if it is 55 or less; high GI if 70 or more; and mid-range GI if 56 to 69.

The term was introduced in 1981 by David J. Jenkins and co-workers at the University of Toronto, and was created to compare the relative effects of different foods on postprandial glucose levels. It is useful for quantifying the relative rapidity with which the body breaks down carbohydrates. It takes into account only the available carbohydrate (total carbohydrate minus fiber) in a food. Glycemic index does not predict an individual's glycemic response to a food, but can be used as a tool to assess the insulin response burden of a food, averaged across a studied population. Individual responses vary greatly.

The glycemic index is usually applied in the context of the quantity of the food and the amount of carbohydrate in the food that is actually consumed. A related measure, the glycemic load (GL), factors this in by multiplying the glycemic index of the food in question by the carbohydrate content of the actual serving.

== Measurement ==
The glycemic index of a food is defined as the incremental area under the two-hour blood glucose response curve (AUC) following a 12-hour fast and ingestion of a food with a certain quantity of available carbohydrate (usually 50 g). The AUC of the test food is divided by the AUC of the standard (either glucose or white bread, giving two different definitions) and multiplied by 100. The average GI value is calculated from data collected in 10 human subjects. Both the standard and test food must contain an equal amount of available carbohydrate. The result gives a relative ranking for each tested food.

Foods with carbohydrates that break down quickly during digestion and release glucose rapidly into the bloodstream tend to have a high GI; foods with carbohydrates that break down more slowly, releasing glucose more gradually into the bloodstream, tend to have a low GI.

A lower glycemic index suggests slower rates of digestion and absorption of the foods' carbohydrates and can also indicate greater extraction from the liver and periphery of the products of carbohydrate digestion.

The current validated methods use glucose as the reference food, giving it a glycemic index value of 100 by definition. This has the advantages of being universal and producing maximum GI values of approximately 100. White bread can also be used as a reference food, giving a different set of GI values (if white bread = 100, then glucose ≈ 140). For people whose staple carbohydrate source is white bread, this has the advantage of conveying directly whether replacement of the dietary staple with a different food would result in faster or slower blood glucose response. A disadvantage with using white bread as a reference food is that it is not a well-defined reference: there is no universal standard for the carbohydrate content of white bread.

== Accuracy ==
Glycemic index charts often give only one value per food, but variations are possible due to:

- Ripeness — riper fruits contain more sugars, increasing GI
- Cooking methods — the more cooked, or overcooked, a food, the more its cellular structure is broken, with a tendency for it to digest quickly and raise blood glucose more
- Processing — e.g., flour has a higher GI than the whole grain from which it is ground as grinding breaks the grain's protective layers and with the length of storage. Potatoes are a notable example, ranging from moderate to very high GI even within the same variety.
- Consumption order — changing the order that foods are eaten was demonstrated to affect blood glucose levels, where eating starches or sugars first resulted in faster increases than when eaten after the rest of the meal

More importantly, the glycemic response is different from one person to another, and also in the same person from day to day, depending on blood glucose levels, insulin resistance, and other factors.

The glycemic index only indicates the impact on glucose level two hours after eating the food. People with diabetes have elevated levels for four hours or longer after eating certain foods.

== Grouping ==
GI values can be interpreted intuitively as percentages on an absolute scale and are commonly interpreted as follows:

Group	GI range	Examples
Low	55 or less	fructose; pulses (black, pinto, kidney, lentil, peanut, chickpea); small seeds (sunflower, flax, pumpkin, poppy, sesame, hemp); walnuts, cashews, most whole intact grains (durum/spelt/kamut wheat, millet, oat, rye, rice, barley); most vegetables, most sweet fruits (peaches, strawberries, mangos); tagatose; mushrooms; chilis, unpeeled sweet potato
Medium	56–69	white sugar or sucrose, not intact whole wheat or enriched wheat, pita bread, basmati rice, unpeeled white/yellow potato, grape juice, raisins, prunes, pumpernickel bread, cranberry juice, regular ice cream, banana, peeled sweet potato
High	70 and above	glucose (dextrose, grape sugar), high fructose corn syrup, white bread (only from wheat endosperm), most white rice (only from rice endosperm), corn flakes, extruded breakfast cereals, maltose, maltodextrins, peeled white/yellow potato (83).

A low-GI food will cause blood glucose levels to increase more slowly and steadily, which leads to lower postprandial (after meal) blood glucose readings. A high-GI food causes a more rapid rise in blood glucose level and is suitable for energy recovery after exercise or for a person experiencing hypoglycemia.

The glycemic effect of foods depends on various factors, such as the type of starch (amylose versus amylopectin), physical entrapment of the starch molecules within the food, fat and protein content of the food and organic acids or their salts in the meal. The presence of fat or soluble dietary fiber can slow the gastric emptying rate, thus lowering the GI. In general, coarse, grainy breads with higher amounts of fiber have a lower GI value than white breads.

Many modern diets rely on the glycemic index, including the South Beach Diet, Transitions by Market America and NutriSystem Nourish Diet. However, others have pointed out that foods generally considered to be unhealthy can have a low glycemic index, for instance, chocolate cake (GI 38), ice cream (37), or pure fructose (19), whereas foods like potatoes and rice have GIs around 100 but are commonly eaten in some countries with low rates of diabetes.

== Application ==
=== Weight control ===
Dietary replacement of saturated fats by carbohydrates with a low glycemic index may be beneficial for weight control, whereas substitution with refined, high glycemic index carbohydrates is not. However, a 2023 Cochrane review did not find that adoption of low glycemic index (or load) diets by people who are overweight or obese leads to more weight loss (and better fat control) than use of diets involving higher glycemic index/load or other strategies.

In clinical management of obesity, diets based on a low glycemic index/load appear to provide better glycemic and inflammatory control than ones based on a high glycemic index/load (and therefore could potentially be more effective in preventing obesity-related diseases). In overweight and obese children, adoption of low glycemic index/load diets may not lead to weight loss but might potentially provide other benefits.

== Limitations ==
=== Compared to quantity of carbohydrate ===
Depending on quantities, the number of grams of carbohydrate in a food can have a bigger impact on blood sugar levels than the glycemic index does. Consuming less dietary energy, losing weight, and carbohydrate counting can be better for lowering the blood sugar level. Carbohydrates impact glucose levels most profoundly, and two foods with the same carbohydrate content are, in general, comparable in their effects on blood sugar. A food with a low glycemic index can have a high carbohydrate content or vice versa; this can be accounted for with the glycemic load (GL) where GL = (GI × grams of carbohydrate per serving)/100.

=== Compared to insulin index ===
While the glycemic index of foods is used as a guide to the rise in blood glucose that should follow meals containing those foods, actual increases in blood glucose show considerable variability from person to person, even after consumption of identical meals. This is in part because glycemic index does not take into account other factors besides glycemic response, such as insulin response, which is measured by the insulin index and can be more appropriate in representing the effects from some food contents other than carbohydrates. In particular, since it is based on the area under the curve of the glucose response over time from ingesting a subject food, the shape of the curve has no bearing on the corresponding GI value. The glucose response can rise to a high level and fall quickly, or rise less high but remain there for a longer time, and have the same area under the curve.

== See also ==
- David Ludwig (physician), American endocrinologist who promotes low-carb diets
- Diabetic diet, a diet that often focuses on eating low GI foods
- Disposition index, a biomarker for how strongly a spike in GI creates a feedback loop in blood sugar regulating hormones
- Glycemic efficacy
- Low glycemic index diet, diets which restrict carbohydrates and reduce blood sugar as an effect
- Montignac diet, fad diet based on minimizing GI and GL
- Overall nutritional quality index
- Retrogradation (starch)
