= Frederick Madison Allen =

American physician

- Born: March 16, 1879; Iowa, U.S.
- Died: April 14, 1957 (aged 78); Maine, U.S.
- Occupation: Physician

Frederick Madison Allen (March 16, 1879 – April 14, 1957) was an American physician who is best remembered for his carbohydrate-restricted low-calorie diet for sufferers of diabetes mellitus. He was known for developing the "starvation diet" as a treatment.

== Life ==
Born in Iowa, Allen studied medicine in California and obtained a fellowship at Harvard University to work on sugar consumption. He soon became obsessed with diabetes. In 1913, he privately printed a 1179-page book on diabetes that described hundreds of animal experiments and featured a 1200-item bibliography. He was appointed to a junior position at the Rockefeller Institute in 1914.

=== Diabetes treatment ===
Allen believed that previous diabetic treatments had been ineffective because they attempted to substitute fats for carbohydrates. This eventually led to acidosis, followed by coma and death. Only a starvation diet that limited the total caloric consumption would be effective. Allen found that a liquids-only diet could eliminate glycosuria and acidosis. The diabetic could then begin to eat gradually increasing diets, until sugar again began to show up in the urine. This test would allow him to determine how many calories a patient could safely consume.

Allen opened the Physiatric Institute in Morristown, New Jersey, the world's first clinic for sufferers of diabetes mellitus, on April 26, 1921. Patients were held to diets as low as 400 calories per day, with carbohydrates virtually eliminated from the diet. Although successful in eliminating glycosuria, Allen's extreme diets were difficult to follow. Patients who dropped out of treatment and returned to their former diets would die shortly afterwards. Patients who followed the diets faithfully would become undernourished and die of starvation, although they would live longer.

Allen was given early access to insulin after its discovery at the University of Toronto, but the quantities available were limited due to production difficulties. One of his patients, Elizabeth Hughes, the daughter of U.S. Secretary of State Charles Evans Hughes, went directly to Toronto to be treated with insulin by Frederick Banting. Hughes weighed just 45 pounds (20 kg) when she left. Three months later, Allen visited Hughes in Toronto and saw a healthy 15 year-old of normal weight: "Dr. Allen said with his mouth wide open – Oh! – and that's all he did."

=== After insulin ===
The discovery of insulin ended Allen's preeminence in diabetes treatment. Diabetes specialists were no longer in great demand, as insulin made it possible for any general practitioner to treat diabetes. He refocused his efforts on hypertension, using low-salt diets to control blood pressure. In 1927, he marketed an oral hypoglycemic pill with Squibb that was made from mulberry and blueberry leaves, but the pill failed and left him deep in debt. By 1929, Allen had moved the Physiatric Institute to Rye, New York and was opening a new treatment center for metabolic disorders in Midtown Manhattan. In 1936, the Physiatric Institute was shut down.

Allen spent the rest of his life moving between hospitals, doing research into refrigeration in surgery and cancer. He died in 1957 at the age of 78.

== Legacy ==
Allen was not the first person to recommend treatment of diabetes by diet; as Ramachandran and Viswanathan (1998) point out, dietary treatment of diabetes mellitus was used in ancient Egypt as long ago as 3,500 B.C., and was being used in India about 2,500 years ago. These authors note that in the eighteenth century, John Rollo had observed that glycosuria in diabetics could be reduced if sufferers of diabetes mellitus reduced the quantity of their food consumed. However, Allen became famous in his own day for his recommendations, and Allen and his co-workers published their work on the diabetic diet in 1919, in a work entitled Total Dietary Regulation in the Treatment of Diabetes. Today, however, diabetologists would take quite different views on this subject to those promoted by Allen. Indeed, Joslin, in 1922, suggested different diet recommendations to those of Allen, suggesting a reduction of fat rather than carbohydrate, with the overall goal of reduction in calorie intake (Hockaday, 1981). Allen has been described as one of the two leading diabetologists, along with Elliott P. Joslin, in the pre-Insulin period 1910 to 1920.

== Selected publications ==
- Studies Concerning Glycosuria and Diabetes (1913)
- Total Dietary Regulation in the Treatment of Diabetes (1919)

== See also ==
- Diabetic diet

== Sources ==
- Hockaday, T.D.R. (1981). Should the diabetic diet be based on carbohydrate of fat restriction? In M. Turner & B. Thomas (eds.). Nutrition and Diabetes. London : Libbey, 1981. pp23–32.ISBN 0861960084
- Ramachandran, A. & Viswanathan, M. (1998). Dietary management of diabetes mellitus in India and South Asia. In K.G.M.M. Alberti, R.A. DeFronzo & P. Zimmet (eds.). International textbook of diabetes mellitus. pp773–777. Chichester : Wiley, 1997.
- Williams, G. & Pickup, J. (2004). The handbook of diabetes (third edition). Oxford : Blackwell Science, 2004. ISBN 1-4051-2052-5
