= Elizabeth Hughes Gossett =

First American treated with insulin for diabetes

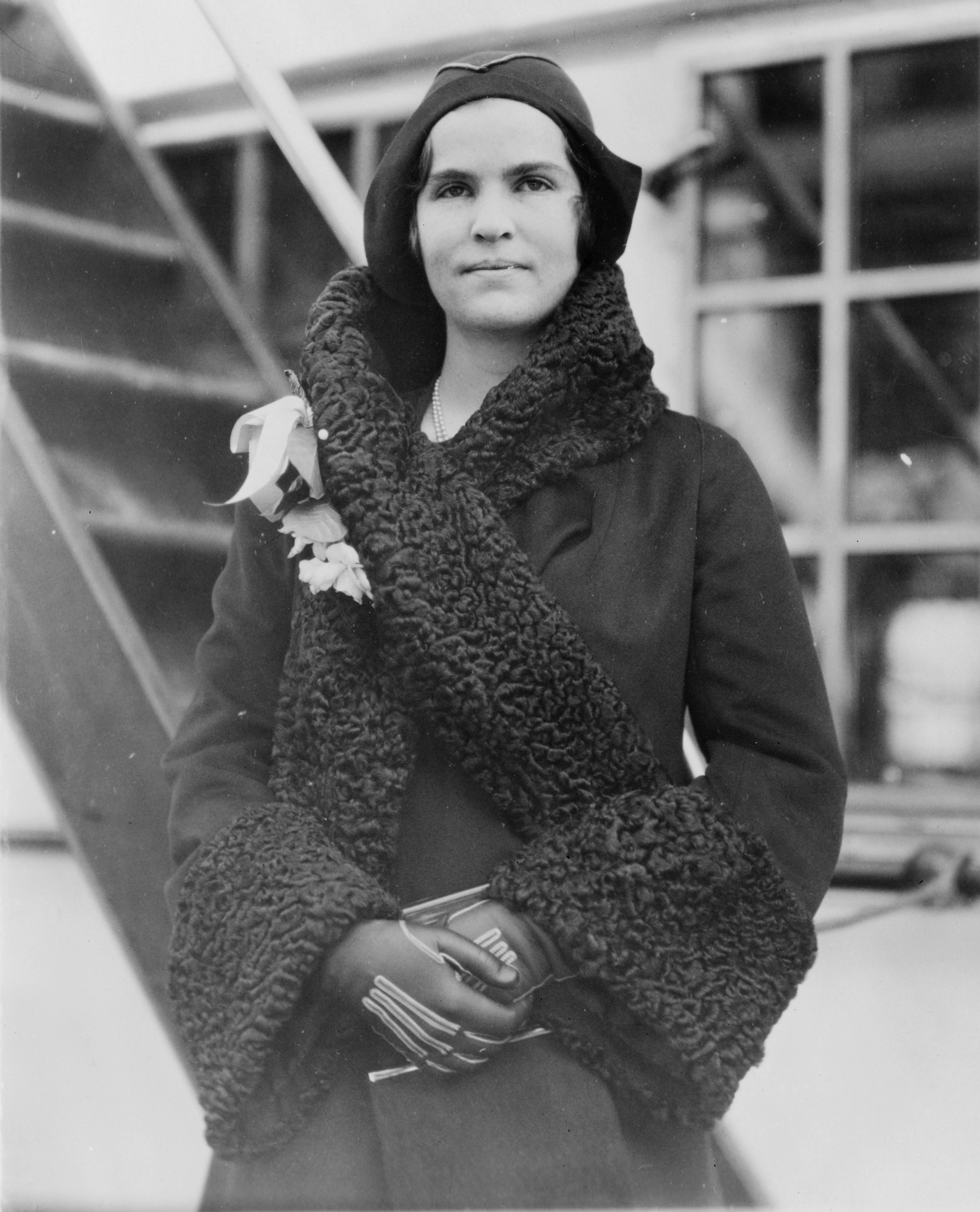
- Gossett c.1930
- Born: August 19, 1907; Albany, New York, U.S.
- Died: April 25, 1981 (aged 73); Detroit, Michigan, U.S.
- Education: Barnard College
- Spouse: William T. Gossett (m. 1930)
- Children: 3
- Father: Charles Evans Hughes

Elizabeth Evans Hughes Gossett (August 19, 1907 – April 21, 1981), the daughter of statesman Charles Evans Hughes, was the first American, and one of the first people in the world, treated with insulin for type 1 diabetes. She received over 42,000 insulin shots over her lifetime.

== Early life ==
Elizabeth Evans Hughes was born August 19, 1907, in the New York State Executive Mansion in Albany, New York, to Antoinette (Carter) and Charles Evans Hughes, who was Governor of New York at the time.

Elizabeth developed diabetes in 1918 at age 11. At the time, the life expectancy of a Type 1 diabetic without treatment was usually no more than a few months. Since it was unable to metabolize sugars, the diabetic body would instead begin to burn fats. The dependence on fat would eventually lead to acidosis, followed by coma and death. The only known treatment was a low-carbohydrate low-calorie diet at a level that the patient could tolerate without showing sugar in the urine. If the diet was carefully observed, diabetics could expect to live for a couple of years before eventually succumbing to starvation, organ damage, or an infectious disease in their malnourished state.

In spring 1919, Elizabeth Hughes was brought to Dr. Frederick Madison Allen at his special clinic, the Physiatric Institute in Morristown, New Jersey. Allen put her on a strict diet and continued to monitor her condition over the next three years while she lived at home with a private nurse. She was 4 feet 11.5 inches (1.511 m) and 75 pounds (34 kg) when she developed diabetes. Under diets that averaged 800 calories per day, her weight fell to 45 pounds (20 kg) by August 1922.

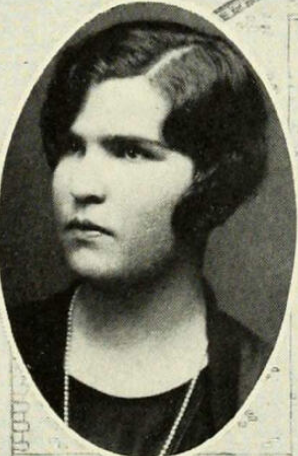
Elizabeth Evans Hughes, from the 1929 yearbook of Barnard College

From summer 1921 to spring 1922, a team at the University of Toronto succeeded in isolating the hormone insulin, which type 1 diabetics are unable to produce on their own. Hughes's mother contacted Canadian doctor Frederick Banting, who agreed to take her as a private patient. Hughes arrived in Toronto with her mother on August 15, 1922, and began receiving insulin from Dr. Banting. She recovered rapidly, and she was placed on a 2200–2400 calorie weight-gain diet within two weeks. She returned home to Washington, D.C., on Thanksgiving Day 1922.

== Adult life ==
Elizabeth returned to school in 1923 and graduated from Barnard College in 1929. In 1930 she married William T. Gossett, a lawyer who later served as the president of the American Bar Association (1968-69) as well as vice president and general counsel of the Ford Motor Company. They lived in Bloomfield, Michigan, and had two daughters and a son.

Elizabeth Gossett was active in civic affairs in the Detroit area. She was a member of the board of trustees of Barnard College, one of the founding trustees of Oakland University, Rochester, a member of the Detroit Urban League, as well as a volunteer at the Merrill-Palmer Institute and at Michigan State University. She was best known as the founder of the Supreme Court Historical Society in 1972 and served as its president until 1979.

Gossett died of a heart attack on April 21, 1981, at the age of 73. By the time of her death, she had received approximately 42,000 insulin injections over 58 years. Although her name had been prominently mentioned in the newspaper coverage of insulin in 1922, she later hid her diabetes from her friends and associates. She destroyed most of the material that documented her treatments, and even removed references to diabetes in her father's papers.

== Legacy ==
The Hughes Gossett Awards, presented by the Supreme Court Historical Society, are named in her honor. She was portrayed in the Canadian miniseries on the discovery of insulin, Glory Enough for All.

== See also ==
- Leonard Thompson, first person treated with insulin
