= Arcizac-Adour =

- Commune
- Coat of arms
- Location of Arcizac-Adour
- Location within France Location within Occitanie
- Coordinates: 43°09′26″N 0°06′00″E
- Country: France
- Region: Occitania
- Department: Hautes-Pyrénées
- Arrondissement: Tarbes
- Canton: Moyen Adour
- Intercommunality: CA Tarbes-Lourdes-Pyrénées

Government
  - Mayor (2020–2026): Louis Casteran
- Area^{1}: 5.1 km^{2} (2.0 sq mi)
- Elevation: 410 m (1,350 ft)
- Highest elevation: 522 m (1,713 ft)
- Lowest elevation: 385 m (1,263 ft)
- Population (2023): 614
  - Density: 120/km^{2} (310/sq mi)
- Time zone: UTC+01:00 (CET)
  - Summer (DST): UTC+02:00 (CEST)
- INSEE/Postal code: 65019 /65360
- ^{1} French Land Register data, which excludes lakes, ponds, glaciers > 1 km^{2} (0.386 sq mi or 247 acres) and river estuaries.

Arcizac-Adour (French pronunciation: [aʁsizak aduʁ]; Occitan: Arcisac d'Ador) is a commune in the Hautes-Pyrénées department in southwestern France.

== Population ==
Historical population
Year	Pop.	±% p.a.
1968	360	—
1975	378	+0.70%
1982	440	+2.19%
1990	449	+0.25%
1999	471	+0.53%
2007	511	+1.02%
2012	507	−0.16%
2017	534	+1.04%
2023	614	+2.35%
Source: INSEE

== See also ==
- Communes of the Hautes-Pyrénées department
