= Canton of Moyen Adour =

Coordinates: 43.20°N 0.12°E

The canton of Moyen Adour is an administrative division of the Hautes-Pyrénées department, southwestern France. It was created at the French canton reorganisation which came into effect in March 2015. Its seat is in Barbazan-Debat.

It consists of the following communes:

1. Allier
2. Angos
3. Arcizac-Adour
4. Barbazan-Debat
5. Bernac-Debat
6. Bernac-Dessus
7. Horgues
8. Laloubère
9. Momères
10. Montignac
11. Odos
12. Salles-Adour
13. Saint-Martin
14. Sarrouilles
15. Vielle-Adour
