= Salles-Adour =

- Commune
- Coat of arms
- Location of Salles-Adour
- Location within France Location within Occitanie
- Coordinates: 43°11′05″N 0°06′00″E
- Country: France
- Region: Occitania
- Department: Hautes-Pyrénées
- Arrondissement: Tarbes
- Canton: Moyen Adour
- Intercommunality: CA Tarbes-Lourdes-Pyrénées

Government
  - Mayor (2020–2026): Claude Lesgards
- Area^{1}: 2.48 km^{2} (0.96 sq mi)
- Elevation: 363 m (1,191 ft)
- Highest elevation: 377 m (1,237 ft)
- Lowest elevation: 347 m (1,138 ft)
- Population (2023): 568
  - Density: 229/km^{2} (593/sq mi)
- Time zone: UTC+01:00 (CET)
  - Summer (DST): UTC+02:00 (CEST)
- INSEE/Postal code: 65401 /65360
- ^{1} French Land Register data, which excludes lakes, ponds, glaciers > 1 km^{2} (0.386 sq mi or 247 acres) and river estuaries.

Salles-Adour (French pronunciation: [sal aduʁ]; Occitan: Salas d'Ador) is a commune in the Hautes-Pyrénées department in south-western France.

== See also ==
- Communes of the Hautes-Pyrénées department
