= Odos =

- Commune
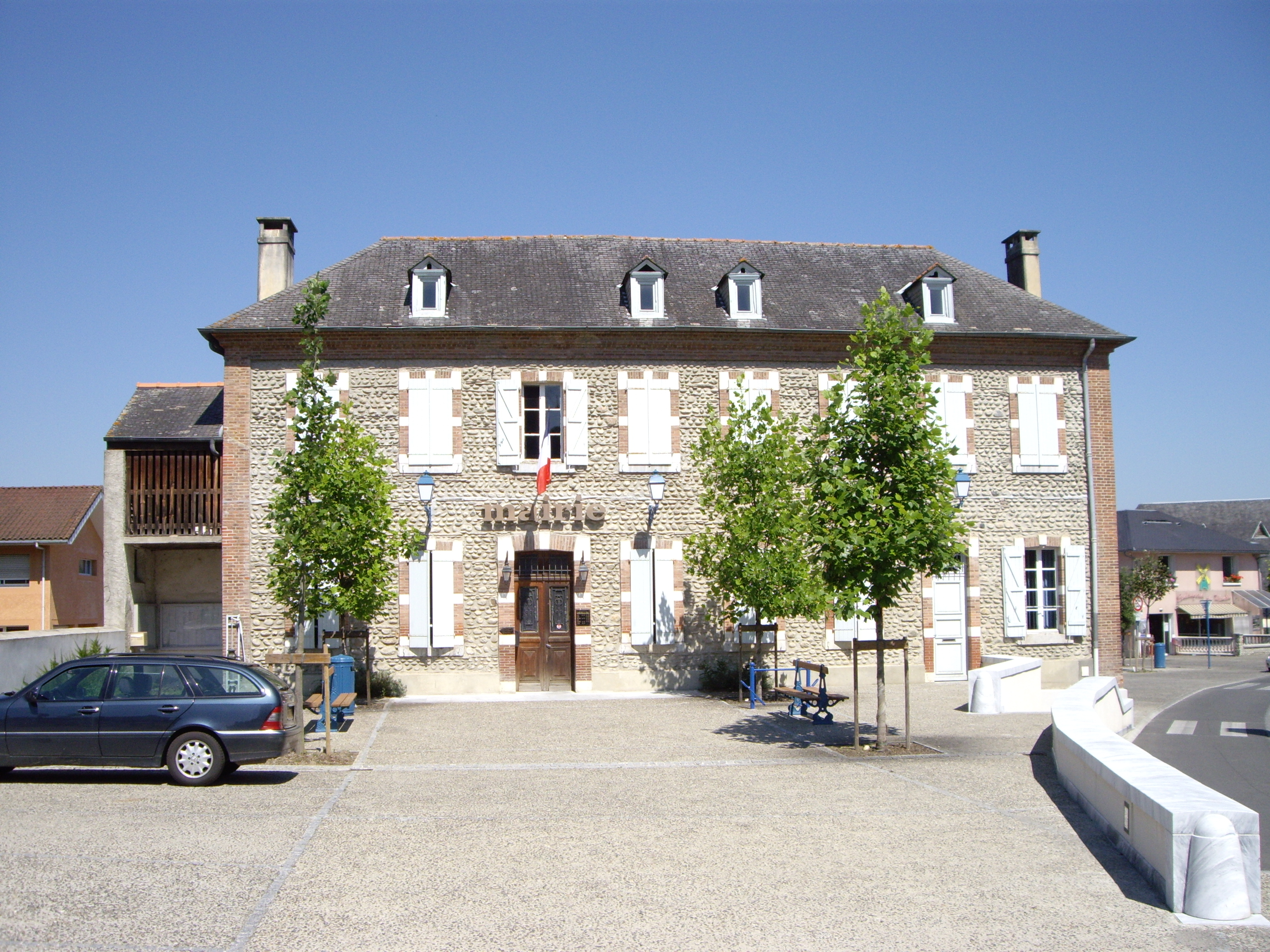
- The town hall

- Coat of arms
- Location of Odos
- Location within France Location within Occitanie
- Coordinates: 43°11′49″N 0°03′31″E
- Country: France
- Region: Occitania
- Department: Hautes-Pyrénées
- Arrondissement: Tarbes
- Canton: Moyen Adour
- Intercommunality: CA Tarbes-Lourdes-Pyrénées

Government
  - Mayor (2020–2026): Isabelle Loubradou
- Area^{1}: 8.77 km^{2} (3.39 sq mi)
- Elevation: 336 m (1,102 ft)
- Highest elevation: 391 m (1,283 ft)
- Lowest elevation: 315 m (1,033 ft)
- Population (2023): 3,265
  - Density: 372/km^{2} (964/sq mi)
- Time zone: UTC+01:00 (CET)
  - Summer (DST): UTC+02:00 (CEST)
- INSEE/Postal code: 65331 /65310
- ^{1} French Land Register data, which excludes lakes, ponds, glaciers > 1 km^{2} (0.386 sq mi or 247 acres) and river estuaries.

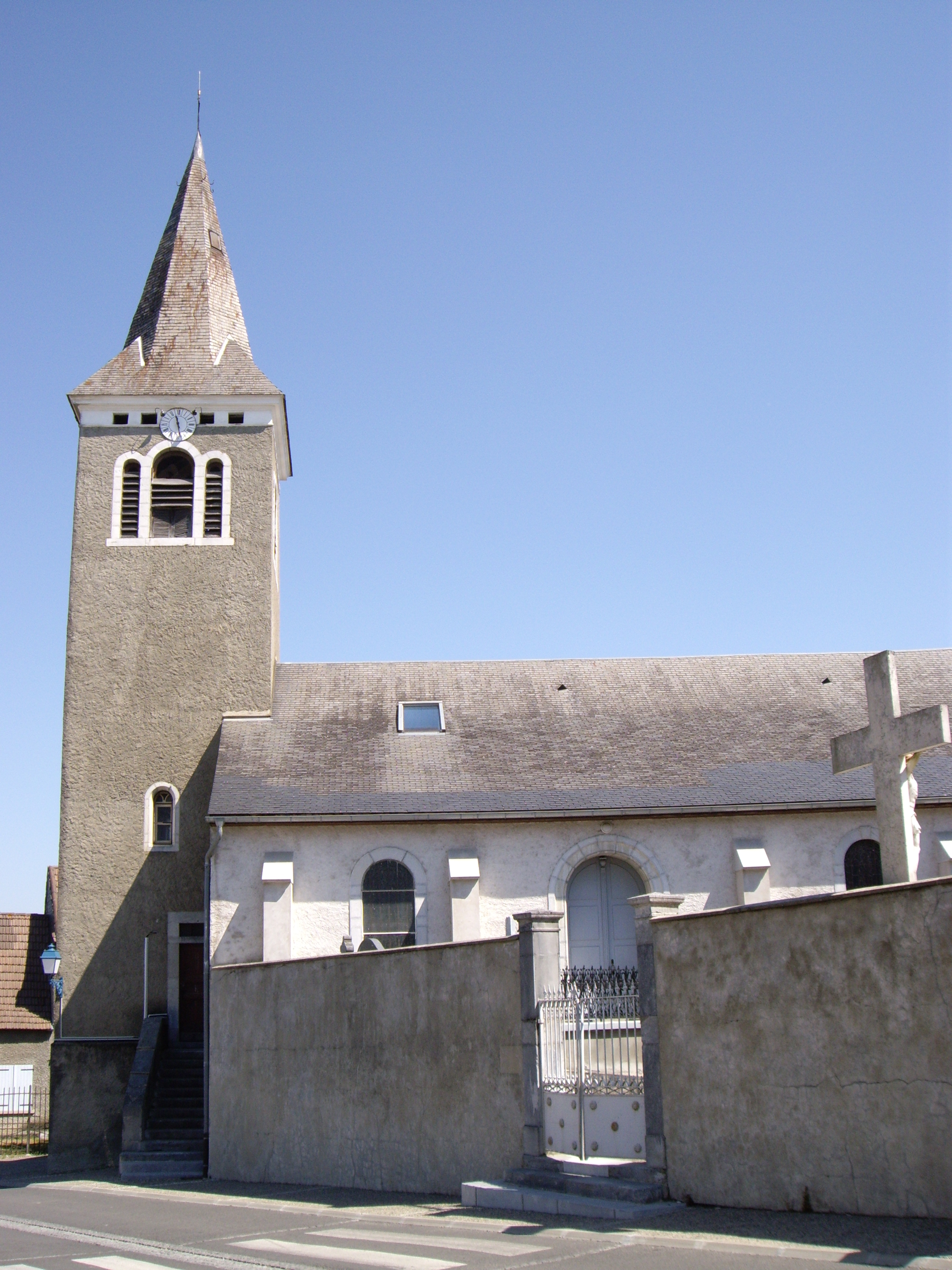
Saint George's church

Odos (French pronunciation: [ɔdɔs]; Occitan: Audòs) is a commune in the Hautes-Pyrénées department in south-western France.

== Population ==
Historical population
Year	Pop.	±% p.a.
1968	1,023	—
1975	2,222	+11.72%
1982	2,854	+3.64%
1990	3,287	+1.78%
1999	3,285	−0.01%
2007	3,247	−0.15%
2012	3,228	−0.12%
2017	3,242	+0.09%
2023	3,265	+0.12%
Source: INSEE

== See also ==
- Communes of the Hautes-Pyrénées department
