= Diet in diabetes =

Diet that is recommended for people with diabetes mellitus or high blood glucose

A diabetic diet is a diet that is used by people with diabetes mellitus or high blood sugar to minimize symptoms and dangerous complications of long-term elevations in blood sugar (e.g., cardiovascular disease, kidney disease, obesity).

== Overview ==
Among guideline recommendations including the American Diabetes Association (ADA) and Diabetes UK, there is no consensus that one specific diet is better than others. This is due to a lack of long term high-quality studies on this subject. However, although it does not advocate a particular diet, the American Diabetes Association does recommend using the "Diabetes Plate Method" as a way to balance food groups. In this method, a 9 inch plate is divided into thirds, with 50% containing non-starchy vegetables, 25% protein, and 25% carbohydrates. This approach reflects a general recommendation for a diet low in sugar and refined carbohydrates, while relatively high in dietary fiber, especially soluble fiber. Likewise, people with diabetes may be encouraged to reduce their intake of carbohydrates that have a high glycemic index (GI) and/or Glycemic load (GL), although the ADA and Diabetes UK note that further evidence for this recommendation is needed.

For overweight and obese people with diabetes, the most important aspect of any diet is that it results in loss of body fat. Losing body fat has been proven to improve blood glucose control and lower insulin levels.

== Diet composition ==
=== General ===
People with diabetes can eat any food that they want, preferably a healthy diet with some carbohydrates, but they need to be more cognizant of the carbohydrate content of foods and avoid simple sugars like juices and sugar-sweetened beverages. For people dependent on insulin injections (both type 1 and some type 2 individuals), it is helpful to eat a consistent amount of carbohydrate to make blood sugar management easier.

=== Macronutrients ===
As of 2019 there was no consensus that eating a diet consisting of any particular macronutrient composition (i.e.: the ratio of fat, protein, and carbohydrate in the diet) is more beneficial for people with diabetes. However, research on diabetic diets is limited due to the difficulty of nutritional research. These studies tend to be observational as opposed to experimental, relatively short in duration, and have relatively poor compliance due to the difficulty of controlling the diets of study participants at all hours of the day for extended periods of time. Thus, more large-scale multi-center trials are needed to improve diet recommendations.

==== Carbohydrates ====
Carbohydrates include sugars, starches, and fiber. These foods have the greatest impact on blood sugar levels, because after consumption they are broken down into sugars that are then absorbed by the small intestine.

The American Diabetes Association (ADA) does not recommend a specific amount of carbohydrate consumption for diabetic diets. Although it is recommended to not use fructose as an added sweetener because it may adversely affect plasma lipids. There is no minimum required amount of daily dietary carbohydrates as the body can make glucose through various metabolic processes including gluconeogenesis and glycogenolysis. The same is not true of protein and fat as both contain essential components that cannot be synthesized through human metabolism.

The ADA addresses the glycemic index and glycemic load of foods pertaining to people with diabetes, but they decline to make specific recommendations due to the unclear clinical utility. However, meta-analyses including the most recent Cochrane Systematic Review have found that a low glycemic index diet results in better blood glucose control as measured by glycated hemoglobin A1c (HbA1c) as well as fewer hypoglycemic episodes.

==== Fiber ====
Benefits may be obtained by consumption of dietary fiber. There is some evidence that consuming dietary fiber may help control blood sugar levels; however, the ADA does not recommend any different fiber intake for people with diabetes than for those without diabetes.

==== Fats ====
The ADA does not make a specific recommendation about the total amount of fat that should be consumed by people with diabetes on a daily basis. They do note that studies have shown that high fat diets that have replaced carbohydrates with fat have shown improved glycemic control and improved blood lipid profiles (increased HDL concentration and decreased triglycerides) compared to low fat diets. The ADA recommends avoiding all foods that have artificial sources of trans fats but note that the small amount of trans fats that naturally occur in meat and dairy are not a concern.

==== Cholesterol ====
As at 2019 the ADA does not have a specific recommendation for dietary cholesterol intake. A causal link between dietary cholesterol consumption and cardiovascular disease has not been established.

==== Protein ====
Historically, there has been concern about the level of protein consumption in individuals who have diabetes induced kidney disease; however, there is no evidence that low protein diets improve kidney function. There is no evidence that individuals with diabetes induced kidney disease need to restrict protein intake more than an average person's intake.

=== Specific diets ===
==== Low-carbohydrate diet ====
For people with type 1 diabetes, there is a lack of definitive evidence of the usefulness of low-carbohydrate diets due to limited study of this topic. A meta-analysis published in 2018 found only nine papers that had adequately studied the implementation of low carbohydrate diets in people with type 1 diabetes as of March 2017. This review found that low carbohydrate diets consistently reduced insulin requirements but found inconsistent results in regard to the diet's effect on blood glucose levels. 3 studies found significant decreases in HbA1c on low carbohydrate diets while 5 found that HbA1c levels were stable. This review as well as the ADA consensus statement suggests that low carbohydrate diets may be beneficial for people with type 1 diabetes but larger clinical trials are needed for further evidence.

A low-carbohydrate diet gives slightly better control of glucose metabolism than a low-fat diet in type 2 diabetes. In a 2019 consensus report on nutrition therapy for adults with diabetes and prediabetes the American Diabetes Association (ADA) states "Reducing overall carbohydrate intake for individuals with diabetes has demonstrated the most evidence for improving glycemia (blood sugar) and may be applied in a variety of eating patterns that meet individual needs and preferences.", it also states that reducing overall carbohydrate intake with low- or very low- carbohydrate eating plans is a viable approach. In fact, some investigations say that patients adhering to an low carbohydrate diet may experience remission of diabetes type 2 without adverse consequences

The ADA say low-carbohydrate diets can be useful to help people with type 2 diabetes lose weight, but that these diets were poorly defined, difficult to sustain, unsuitable for certain groups of people and that, for diet composition in general". Overall, the ADA recommends people with diabetes develop "healthy eating patterns rather than focusing on individual macronutrients, micronutrients, or single foods". They recommend that carbohydrates in a diet should come from whole food sources such as "vegetables, legumes, fruits, dairy (milk and yogurt), and whole grains"; highly refined foods and sugary drinks should be avoided.

==== Vegan/vegetarian ====
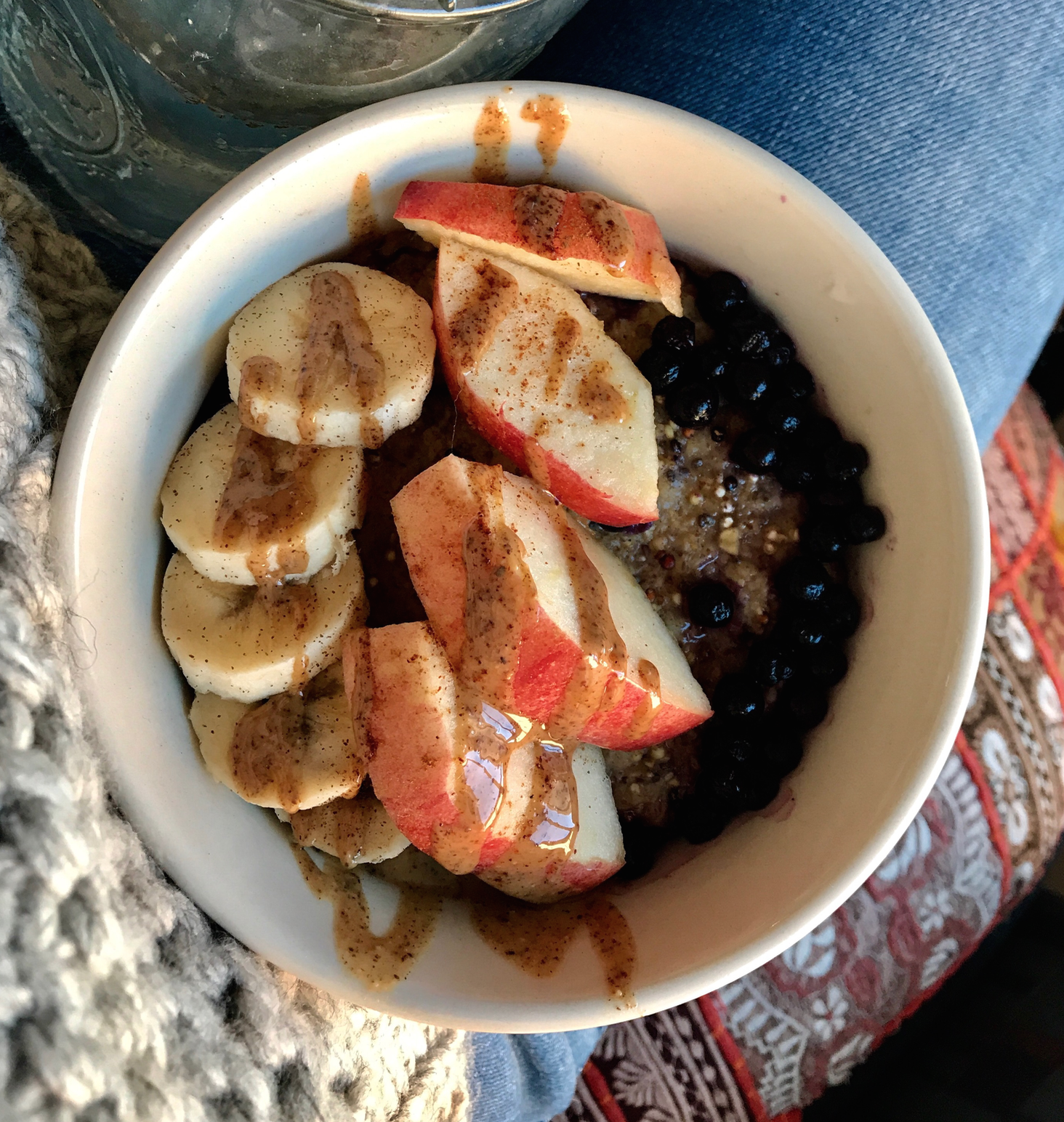
An example of a high fiber vegan breakfast

Although vegan and vegetarian diets can vary greatly in the type of food consumed as well as the macronutrient profile of the diet, they are often lumped together in the context of the scientific literature since they are both considered plant-based diets. Like any other diet's impact on diabetes, the most important factor is the resulting loss of overall fat mass. Both vegan and vegetarian diets have been shown to be beneficial for weight loss in comparison to the standard American diet. For people with type 2 diabetes, the focus of a vegetarian or vegan diet should be maintaining a level of caloric intake that results in fat loss, adequate protein consumption, adequate consumption of compounds that are most bio-available in animal products (i.e. vitamin B-12, iron, creatine), and whole food carbohydrate sources that are lower in glycemic index.

The Academy of Nutrition and Dietetics maintains that well formulated vegetarian and vegan diets can be healthy and nutritionally adequate for people of all ages. The American Diabetes Association notes that the use of vegetarian or vegan diets for diabetes have had inconclusive results in the literature. Two meta-analyses showed small improvements in HbA1C; whereas, one of the two found that the diets resulted in weight loss and improvement in cardiovascular risk factors.

==== Low glycemic index diet ====
Lowering the glycemic index of one's diet may improve the control of diabetes. This includes avoidance of such foods as potatoes cooked in certain ways (i.e.: boiled and mashed potatoes are higher GI than fried) and bread. Lower glycemic index carbohydrate sources include vegetables, legumes, and whole grains that contain higher fiber content and are digested and absorbed into the blood stream more slowly than refined carbohydrates.

==== High fiber diet ====
The ADA recommends a level of fiber intake consistent with the Dietary Guidelines for Americans 2015–2020 (minimum of 14 g of fiber per 1,000 kcal). However, there is some evidence that higher intakes (daily consumption of 50g of fiber and higher), can result in small improvements in blood sugar levels. The ADA cautions that higher intakes may cause digestive issues such as "flatulence, bloating, and diarrhea."

=== Timing of meals ===
For people with diabetes, healthy eating is not simply a matter of what one eats, but also when one eats. For people with insulin-dependent diabetes, when they eat depends on their blood sugar level and the type of insulin they take (i.e.: long-, medium- or quick-acting insulin). If patients check their blood glucose at bedtime and find that it is low, for example below 6 millimoles per liter (108 mg/dL), it is advisable that they take some long-acting carbohydrate before retiring to bed to prevent night-time hypoglycemia. Night sweats, headaches, restless sleep, and nightmares can be a sign of nocturnal hypoglycemia, and patients should consult their doctor for adjustments to their insulin routine if they find that this is the case. Another possible sign of nocturnal hypoglycemia is morning hyperglycemia, which actually occurs in response to blood sugar getting too low at night. This is called the Somogyi effect.

In relation to type 2 diabetes, eating most food earlier in the day may be associated with lower levels of overweight, obesity and other factors that reduce the risk of developing type 2 diabetes. The ADA notes that several studies have shown benefit of intermittent fasting on blood sugar control. However, these studies were relatively small and short in duration and further study is warranted. There were also different protocols for fasting which makes comparisons across studies more difficult.

=== Special diabetes dietary products ===
Diabetes UK have warned against purchase of products that are specially made for people with diabetes, on grounds that:

- They may be expensive
- They may contain high levels of fat
- They may confer no special benefits to people who have diabetes

NICE (the National Institute for Health and Clinical Excellence in the United Kingdom) advises doctors and other health professionals to "Discourage the use of foods marketed specifically for people with diabetes".

=== Alcohol ===
The ADA recommends that people with diabetes limit alcohol consumption as recommended by the Dietary Guidelines for Americans (up to one drink per day for women and up to two drinks per day for men). Consumption of alcohol above this amount may lead to elevation in blood sugar. Consumption of alcohol also puts people with diabetes at increased risk of hypoglycemia. The ADA states that this may be due to the "inhibition of gluconeogenesis, reduced hypoglycemia awareness due to the cerebral effects of alcohol, and/or impaired counterregulatory responses to hypoglycemia." This puts people with diabetes who take insulin or other anti-hyperglycemics at risk of night time or fasting hypoglycemia. Consuming food with alcohol reduces this risk of hypoglycemia.

== History ==
There has been a long history of dietary treatment of diabetes mellitus. Dietary treatment of diabetes mellitus was used in Egypt since 3,500 BC and was used in India by Sushruta and Charaka more than 2000 years ago. In the 18th century, the Scottish surgeon John Rollo argued that calorie restriction could reduce glycosuria in diabetes.

More modern history of the diabetes diet may begin with Frederick Madison Allen and Elliott Joslin, who, in the early 20th century, before insulin was discovered, recommended that people with diabetes eat only a low-calorie and nearly zero-carbohydrate diet to prevent ketoacidosis from killing them. While this approach could extend life by a limited period, people with diabetes developed a variety of other medical problems.

The introduction of insulin by Frederick Banting in 1922 allowed people with diabetes more flexibility in their eating.

=== Exchange scheme ===
In the 1950s, the American Diabetes Association, in conjunction with the U.S. Public Health Service, introduced the "exchange scheme". This allowed people to swap foods of similar nutrition value (e.g., carbohydrate) for another. For example, if wishing to have more than normal carbohydrates for dessert, one could cut back on potatoes in one's first course. The exchange scheme was revised in 1976, 1986, and 1995.

=== Later developments ===
Not all diabetes dietitians today recommend the exchange scheme. Instead, they are likely to recommend a typical healthy diet: one high in fiber, with a variety of fruit and vegetables, and low in both sugar and fat, especially saturated fat.

A diet high in plant fibre was recommended by James Anderson. This may be understood as continuation of the work of Denis Burkitt and Hugh Trowell on dietary fibre, which may be understood as a continuation of the work of Price. It is still recommended that people with diabetes consume a diet that is high in dietary fiber.

In 1976, Nathan Pritikin opened a centre where people with diabetes were put on programme of diet and exercise (the Pritikin Program). This diet is high on carbohydrates and fibre, with fresh fruit, vegetables, and whole grains. A study at UCLA in 2005 showed that it brought dramatic improvement to a group of people with diabetes or pre-diabetes in three weeks, so that about half no longer met the criteria for the disease.

== See also ==
- Diabetes management
- Glycemic efficacy
- List of diets
