= Angos =

- Commune
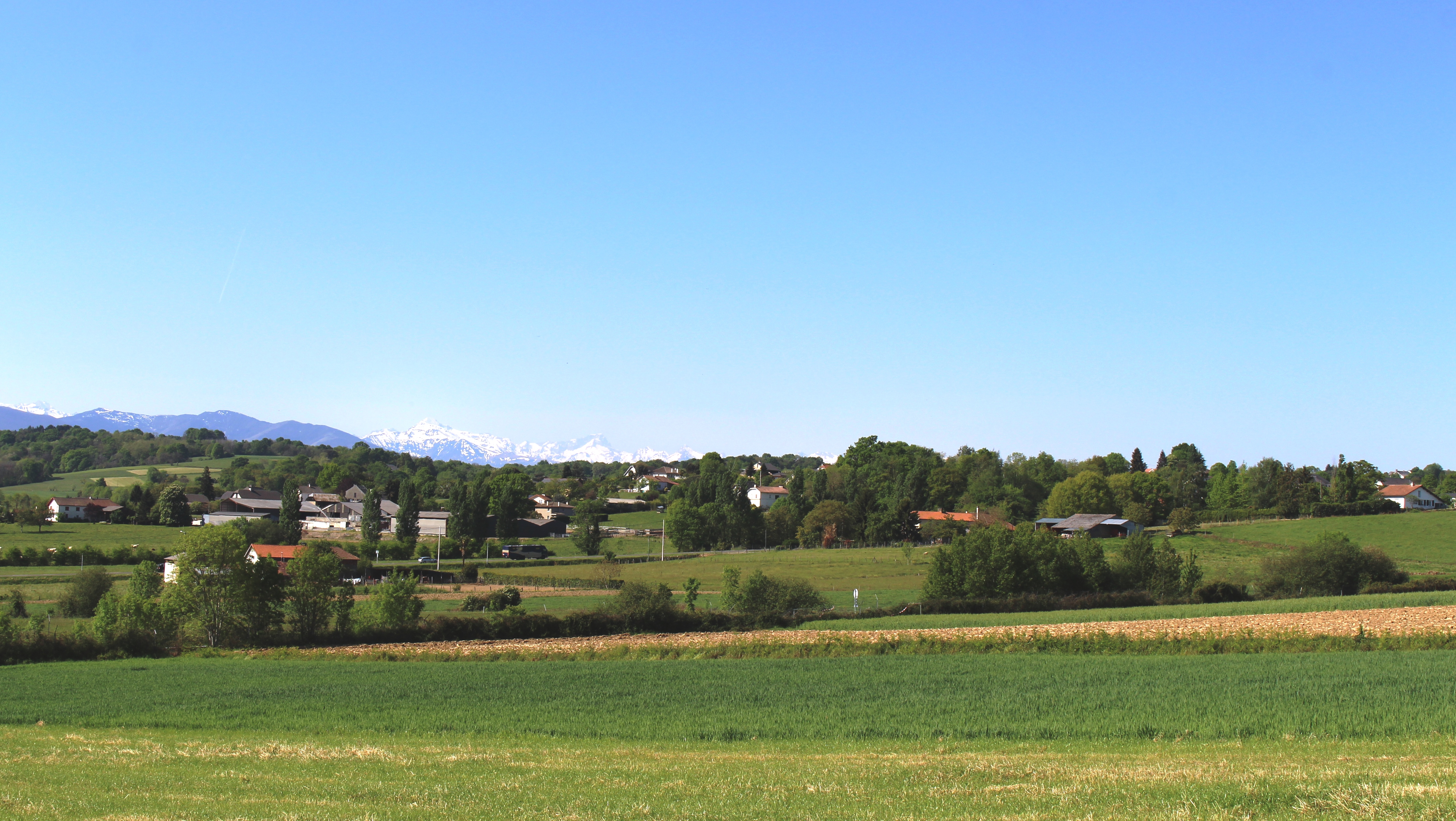

- Coat of arms
- Location of Angos
- Location within France Location within Occitanie
- Coordinates: 43°11′41″N 0°09′08″E
- Country: France
- Region: Occitania
- Department: Hautes-Pyrénées
- Arrondissement: Tarbes
- Canton: Moyen Adour
- Intercommunality: CA Tarbes-Lourdes-Pyrénées

Government
  - Mayor (2020–2026): Francine Mateos
- Area^{1}: 2.98 km^{2} (1.15 sq mi)
- Elevation: 350 m (1,150 ft)
- Highest elevation: 431 m (1,414 ft)
- Lowest elevation: 270 m (890 ft)
- Population (2023): 230
  - Density: 77/km^{2} (200/sq mi)
- Time zone: UTC+01:00 (CET)
  - Summer (DST): UTC+02:00 (CEST)
- INSEE/Postal code: 65010 /65690
- ^{1} French Land Register data, which excludes lakes, ponds, glaciers > 1 km^{2} (0.386 sq mi or 247 acres) and river estuaries.

Angos (Occitan: Angòcia) is a commune in the Hautes-Pyrénées department in southwestern France.

== Population ==
Historical population
Year	Pop.	±% p.a.
1968	117	—
1975	115	−0.25%
1982	173	+6.01%
1990	201	+1.89%
1999	203	+0.11%
2007	231	+1.63%
2012	226	−0.44%
2017	223	−0.27%
2023	230	+0.52%
Source: INSEE

== See also ==
- Communes of the Hautes-Pyrénées department
