= Laloubère =

- Commune
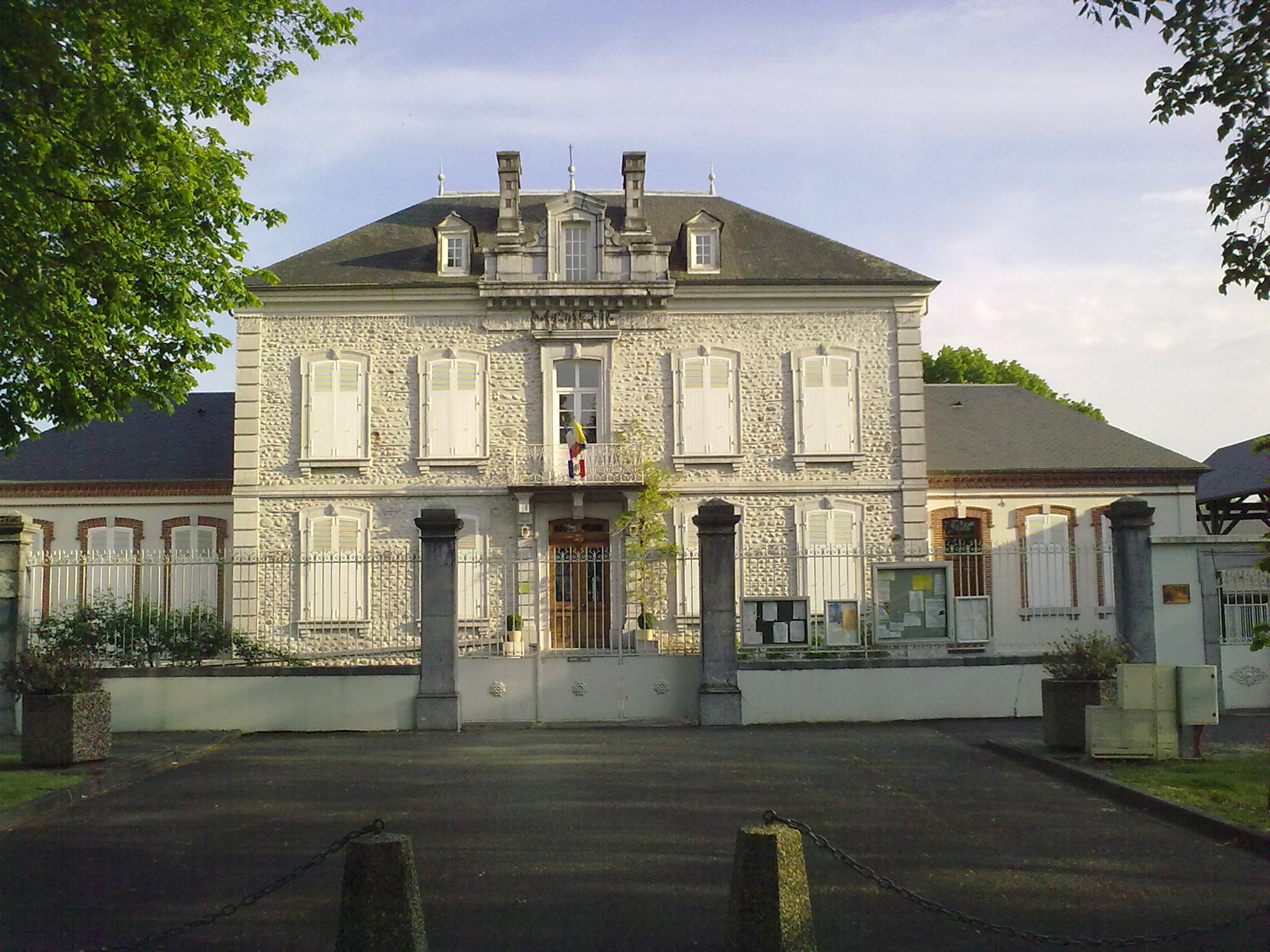
- The town hall

- Coat of arms
- Location of Laloubère
- Location within France Location within Occitanie
- Coordinates: 43°12′27″N 0°04′25″E
- Country: France
- Region: Occitania
- Department: Hautes-Pyrénées
- Arrondissement: Tarbes
- Canton: Moyen Adour
- Intercommunality: CA Tarbes-Lourdes-Pyrénées

Government
  - Mayor (2020–2026): Patrick Vignes
- Area^{1}: 4.05 km^{2} (1.56 sq mi)
- Elevation: 325 m (1,066 ft)
- Highest elevation: 346 m (1,135 ft)
- Lowest elevation: 320 m (1,050 ft)
- Population (2023): 1,846
  - Density: 456/km^{2} (1,180/sq mi)
- Time zone: UTC+01:00 (CET)
  - Summer (DST): UTC+02:00 (CEST)
- INSEE/Postal code: 65251 /65310
- ^{1} French Land Register data, which excludes lakes, ponds, glaciers > 1 km^{2} (0.386 sq mi or 247 acres) and river estuaries.

Laloubère (French pronunciation: [lalubɛʁ]; Occitan: La Lobèra) is a commune in the Hautes-Pyrénées department in south-western France.

== See also ==
- Communes of the Hautes-Pyrénées department
