= Vielle-Adour =

- Commune
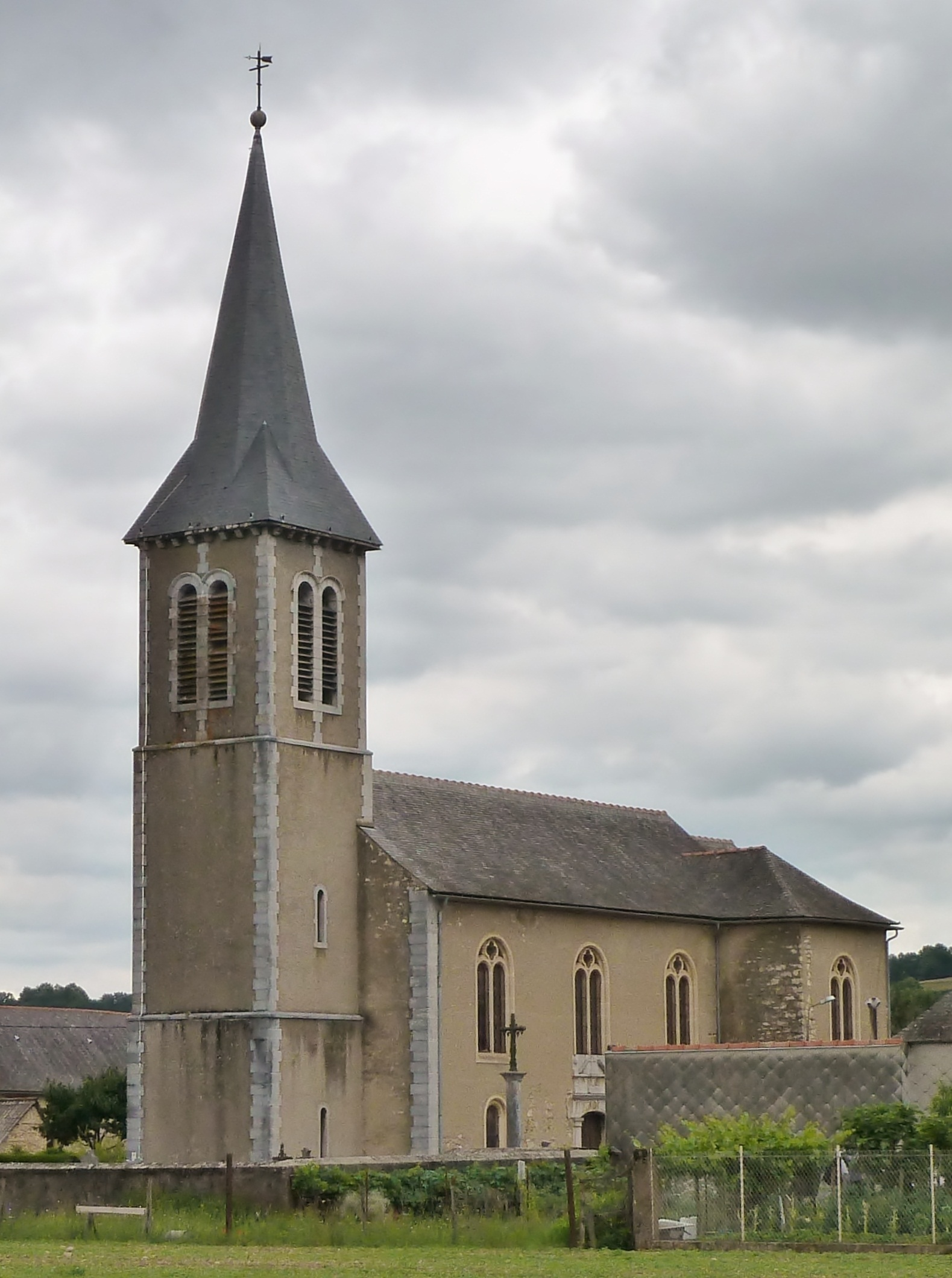
- The church of Vielle-Adour

- Coat of arms
- Location of Vielle-Adour
- Location within France Location within Occitanie
- Coordinates: 43°08′45″N 0°06′57″E
- Country: France
- Region: Occitania
- Department: Hautes-Pyrénées
- Arrondissement: Tarbes
- Canton: Moyen Adour
- Intercommunality: CA Tarbes-Lourdes-Pyrénées

Government
  - Mayor (2020–2026): Jean-Christian Danos
- Area^{1}: 5.82 km^{2} (2.25 sq mi)
- Elevation: 400 m (1,300 ft)
- Highest elevation: 558 m (1,831 ft)
- Lowest elevation: 407 m (1,335 ft)
- Population (2023): 479
  - Density: 82.3/km^{2} (213/sq mi)
- Time zone: UTC+01:00 (CET)
  - Summer (DST): UTC+02:00 (CEST)
- INSEE/Postal code: 65464 /65360
- ^{1} French Land Register data, which excludes lakes, ponds, glaciers > 1 km^{2} (0.386 sq mi or 247 acres) and river estuaries.

Vielle-Adour is a commune in the Hautes-Pyrénées department in south-western France.

== See also ==
- Communes of the Hautes-Pyrénées department
