= Sarrouilles =

- Commune
- Coat of arms
- Location of Sarrouilles
- Location within France Location within Occitanie
- Coordinates: 43°13′53″N 0°07′46″E
- Country: France
- Region: Occitania
- Department: Hautes-Pyrénées
- Arrondissement: Tarbes
- Canton: Moyen Adour
- Intercommunality: CA Tarbes-Lourdes-Pyrénées

Government
  - Mayor (2020–2026): Alain Talbot
- Area^{1}: 4.21 km^{2} (1.63 sq mi)
- Elevation: 305 m (1,001 ft)
- Highest elevation: 427 m (1,401 ft)
- Lowest elevation: 307 m (1,007 ft)
- Population (2023): 551
  - Density: 131/km^{2} (339/sq mi)
- Time zone: UTC+01:00 (CET)
  - Summer (DST): UTC+02:00 (CEST)
- INSEE/Postal code: 65410 /65600
- ^{1} French Land Register data, which excludes lakes, ponds, glaciers > 1 km^{2} (0.386 sq mi or 247 acres) and river estuaries.

Sarrouilles (French pronunciation: [saʁuj]; Occitan: Sarrolhas) is a commune in the Hautes-Pyrénées department in south-western France.

== See also ==
- Communes of the Hautes-Pyrénées department
