= Momères =

- Commune
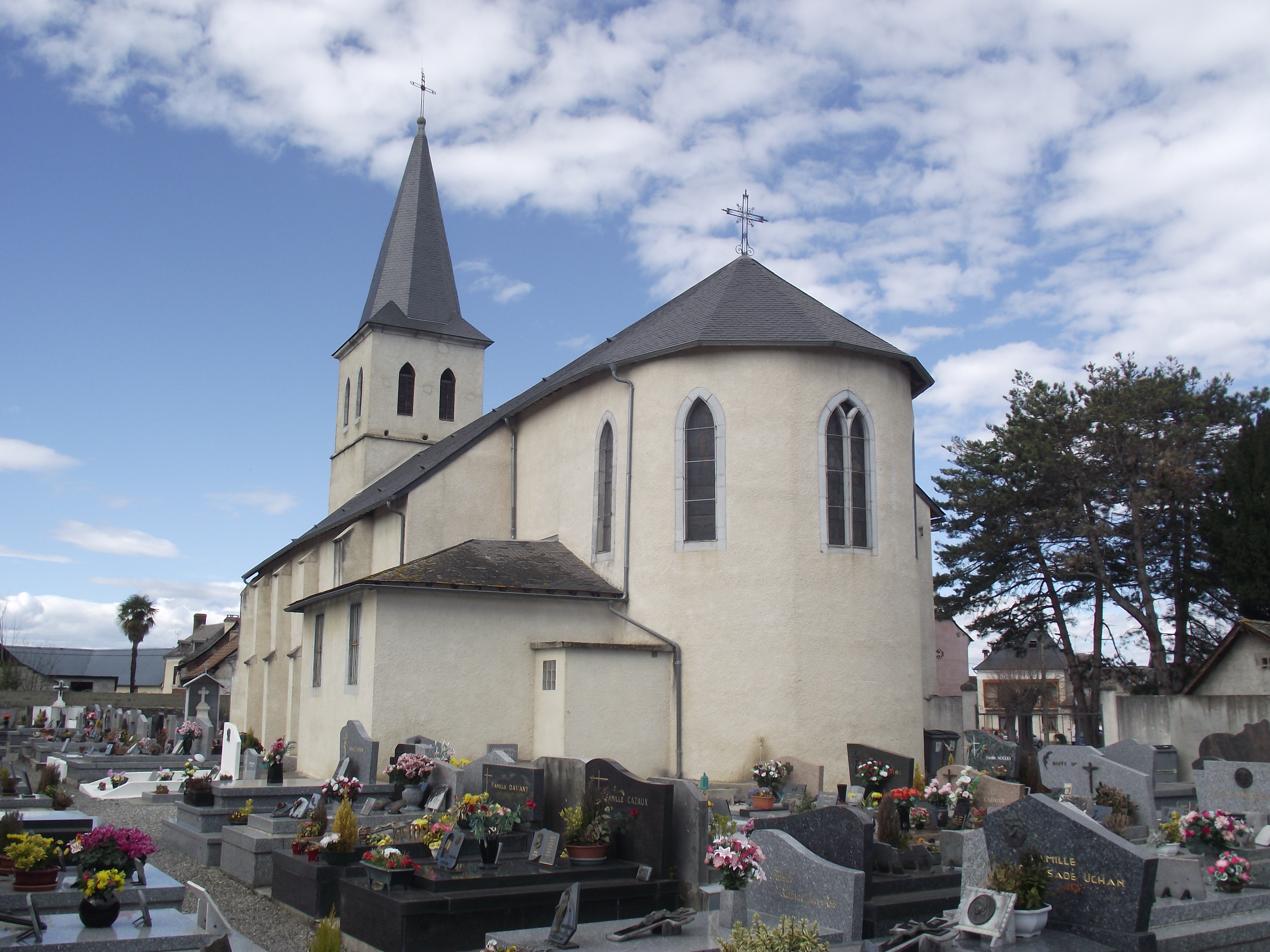
- The church of Saint-Christophe

- Coat of arms
- Location of Momères
- Location within France Location within Occitanie
- Coordinates: 43°10′43″N 0°05′28″E
- Country: France
- Region: Occitania
- Department: Hautes-Pyrénées
- Arrondissement: Tarbes
- Canton: Moyen Adour
- Intercommunality: CA Tarbes-Lourdes-Pyrénées

Government
  - Mayor (2024–2026): Christophe Roman
- Area^{1}: 2.34 km^{2} (0.90 sq mi)
- Elevation: 400 m (1,300 ft)
- Highest elevation: 395 m (1,296 ft)
- Lowest elevation: 361 m (1,184 ft)
- Population (2023): 722
  - Density: 309/km^{2} (799/sq mi)
- Time zone: UTC+01:00 (CET)
  - Summer (DST): UTC+02:00 (CEST)
- INSEE/Postal code: 65313 /65360
- ^{1} French Land Register data, which excludes lakes, ponds, glaciers > 1 km^{2} (0.386 sq mi or 247 acres) and river estuaries.

Momères (French pronunciation: [mɔmɛʁ]; Occitan: Momeras) is a commune in the Hautes-Pyrénées department in south-western France.

== See also ==
- Communes of the Hautes-Pyrénées department
