= Colin Chisholm (medical writer) =

Scottish surgeon and writer

Colin Chisholm M.D. (1755–1825) was a Scottish surgeon, medical writer and Fellow of the Royal Society.

== Life ==
Chisholm served as a military surgeon to the British forces in the American War of Independence. After the war was over, he moved to practise medicine in Grenada; he went there in 1783, at the invitation of John Rollo. In 1790 he visited Demerara, purchasing a cotton plantation. He also picked up an eye remedy from the Arawak Indians, based on a genus Bignonia root.

In 1793 Chisholm was awarded the M.D. degree by King's College, Aberdeen. In 1795 he was made surgeon-general to the ordnance. Attached to Ralph Abercromby's expedition, he then spent five months in the Virgin Islands in 1797, and was promoted to inspector-general of hospitals.

Chisholm retired on half-pay in 1800, moving to his estate in Demerara, where he spent three years growing cotton. Then he migrated back to Europe. He settled in Bristol, where he had a good medical practice.

Chisholm was elected a fellow of the Royal Society on 24 November 1808. His latter days were mainly spent in retirement on the continent. He died in Sloane Street, London, at the beginning of 1825.

== Works ==
Besides papers in medical journals, including the Medical Repository, Andrew Duncan's Medical Commentaries, and Duncan's Annals of Medicine, Chisholm was the author of:

- An Essay on the Malignant Pestilential Fever introduced into the West India Islands from Boulam, on the coast of Guinea, as it appeared in 1793 and 1794, London, 1795 (second edition, much enlarged, 2 vols. London, 1801). This work on "pestilential fever" (a generic term—the disease is now recognised as yellow fever) was based on Chisholm's experiences on Grenada in 1793. A ship, the Hankey, arrived carrying infectious disease presumed to be from Bolama, in what is now Guinea-Bissau. Chisholm gave an account, designed to identify the cause of disease in Grenada as contagion. The theory of contagious disease being contentious, there was criticism, and the second edition amplified the argument with the example of the American Yellow Fever Epidemic of 1793. Subsequently, the term "Bulam fever" was applied to yellow fever, and William Pym wrote on it under that name in 1815.
- A Letter to John Haygarth, M.D., exhibiting further evidence of the infectious nature of the Pestilential Fever in Grenada ... and in America, London, 1809. A continuation of the debate on contagion, addressed to John Haygarth, with the full title naming Edward Miller, an American physician.
- A Manual of the Climate and Diseases of Tropical Countries: In which a Practical View of the Statistical Pathology and of the History and Treatment of the Diseases of Those Countries is Attempted to be Given (1822). This work includes an endorsement of the "nitric acid" theory of treatment of Helenus Scott, based on hospital studied Chisholm had made at Martinique.

The controversy on yellow fever continued well into the 19th century. Usher Parsons writing in 1836 denied it was contagious, and stated that quarantine was useless against it, while citing the views of Chisholm (on two kinds of yellow fever), Pym and James Fellowes, and believers in "contingent contagion". James Ormiston McWilliam had his 1847 report on an outbreak at Boa Vista published by the UK Parliament.

== Family ==
In 1794 Chisholm married Elizabeth Cooper in Inverness. His daughter Janet (c. 1800–1890) married Thomas Waddington (1792–1869), a son of the cotton merchant William Waddington (1751–1818) who emigrated to France. William Henry Waddington was their son.

== Notes ==
Attribution

This article incorporates text from a publication now in the public domain: Stephen, Leslie, ed. (1887). "Chisholm, Colin". Dictionary of National Biography. Vol. 10. London: Smith, Elder & Co.
