= Michel Montignac =

French diet developer (1944–2010)

Michel Montignac (1944 – August 22, 2010) was a French diet developer who originally created the Montignac diet to help himself lose weight, which he based on research that focuses on the glycemic index of foods, which affects the amount of glucose delivered to the blood after eating. The diet, which distinguishes between good and bad carbohydrates, became the basis for best-selling books and a chain of restaurants and stores promoting his diet regimen and was one of the theoretical predecessors of the South Beach Diet.

== Background ==
Born in Angoulême, France in 1944, Montignac had a family history of obesity, with his father weighing 265 pounds (120 kg). He studied political science and worked as a human resources manager, ultimately working as the personnel manager in the 1970s for the European subsidiary of Abbott Laboratories, an American pharmaceutical firm. Using the research materials available to him there, and despite the lack of any formal medical training, he sought a way to counteract the effects of the daily business lunches he ate and came to the determination that the issue in weight loss was not how much you ate but what you consumed. By dividing carbohydrates into two categories, good (including beans, leaf vegetables, lentils, whole grain wheat products, wild rice and dark chocolate) and bad (such as corn, potatoes, refined flour, white bread and white rice), Montignac's research led him to conclude that eating bad carbs, those with a high glycemic index, raises the levels of glucose in the blood and results in weight gain by coaxing the pancreas to generate insulin, which ultimately leads to the conversion of excess glucose into body fat. In 1993 he told The New York Times that "all traditional methods of dieting have amounted to a myth as big as Communism, and like Communism, they are destined to collapse". He tested the diet on himself and lost 30 pounds (14 kg) in three months.

Building on his own experiences and research, Montignac proposed that trying to lose weight by reducing caloric consumption was a "scientific swindle" and that weight could be controlled by monitoring and selecting the foods one ate. Montignac's diet was based on the idea that reducing calories in one's diet triggers a "survival instinct" that causes the body to store fat after losing pounds early in the diet. He self-published the book Dine Out and Lose Weight in 1986 aimed at business people who eat out often as part of their work and sold more than 500,000 copies. By the early 1990s, Montignac was opening a series of diet stores and restaurants that sold such items as beef, cheese, chocolate bars, foie gras that had been traditionally viewed as "symbols of ruinous hedonism" but that were promoted as part of Montignac's diet method. His 1987 book Je Mange Donc Je Maigris (translated in English as Eat Yourself Slim ... and Stay Slim!) was aimed at the general public and had reached sales of 16 million copies in 40 countries by 2005.

A resident of Juvigny, Haute-Savoie, Montignac died of prostate cancer at age 66 on August 22, 2010, at a clinic in Annemasse. "He is survived by his wife, Suzy; their children, Joseph and Peter; and by three children from his first marriage, Charles, Emeric and Sybille. The promotion of his method has been passed on to Suzy and Sybille."

== See also ==
- Raw veganism
