= Saint-Martin, Hautes-Pyrénées =

Saint-Martin
- Commune
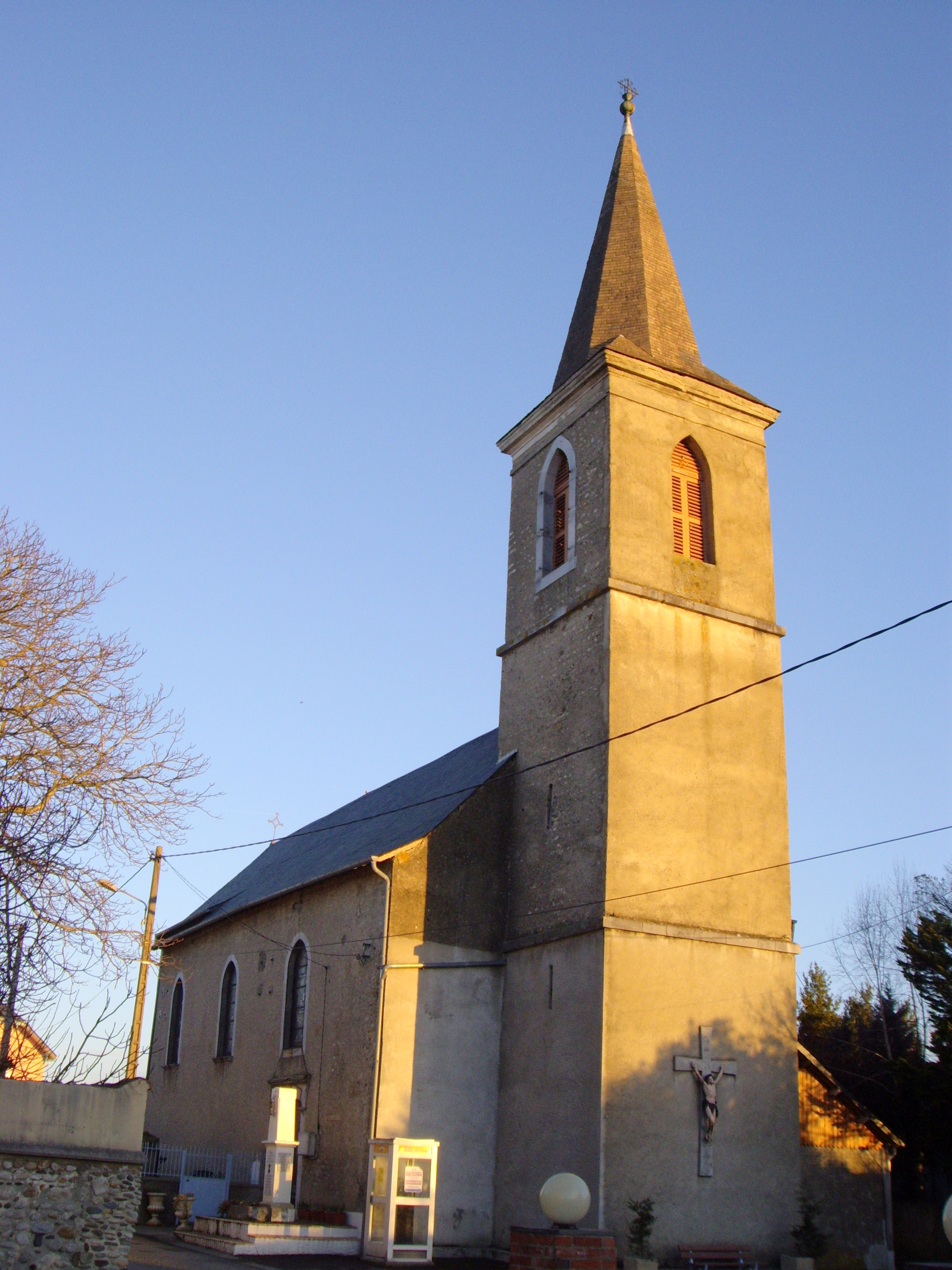
- The church of Saint-Martin

- Coat of arms
- Location of Saint-Martin
- Location within France Location within Occitanie
- Coordinates: 43°09′42″N 0°05′17″E
- Country: France
- Region: Occitania
- Department: Hautes-Pyrénées
- Arrondissement: Tarbes
- Canton: Moyen Adour
- Intercommunality: CA Tarbes-Lourdes-Pyrénées

Government
  - Mayor (2020–2026): Jean-Claude Lassarrette
- Area^{1}: 8.08 km^{2} (3.12 sq mi)
- Elevation: 380 m (1,250 ft)
- Highest elevation: 489 m (1,604 ft)
- Lowest elevation: 332 m (1,089 ft)
- Population (2023): 436
  - Density: 54.0/km^{2} (140/sq mi)
- Time zone: UTC+01:00 (CET)
  - Summer (DST): UTC+02:00 (CEST)
- INSEE/Postal code: 65392 /65360
- ^{1} French Land Register data, which excludes lakes, ponds, glaciers > 1 km^{2} (0.386 sq mi or 247 acres) and river estuaries.

Saint-Martin (French pronunciation: [sɛ̃ maʁtɛ̃]; Gascon: Sent Martin) is a commune in the Hautes-Pyrénées department in south-western France.

== See also ==
- Communes of the Hautes-Pyrénées department
