= Allier, Hautes-Pyrénées =

Allier Alèir (Occitan)
- Commune
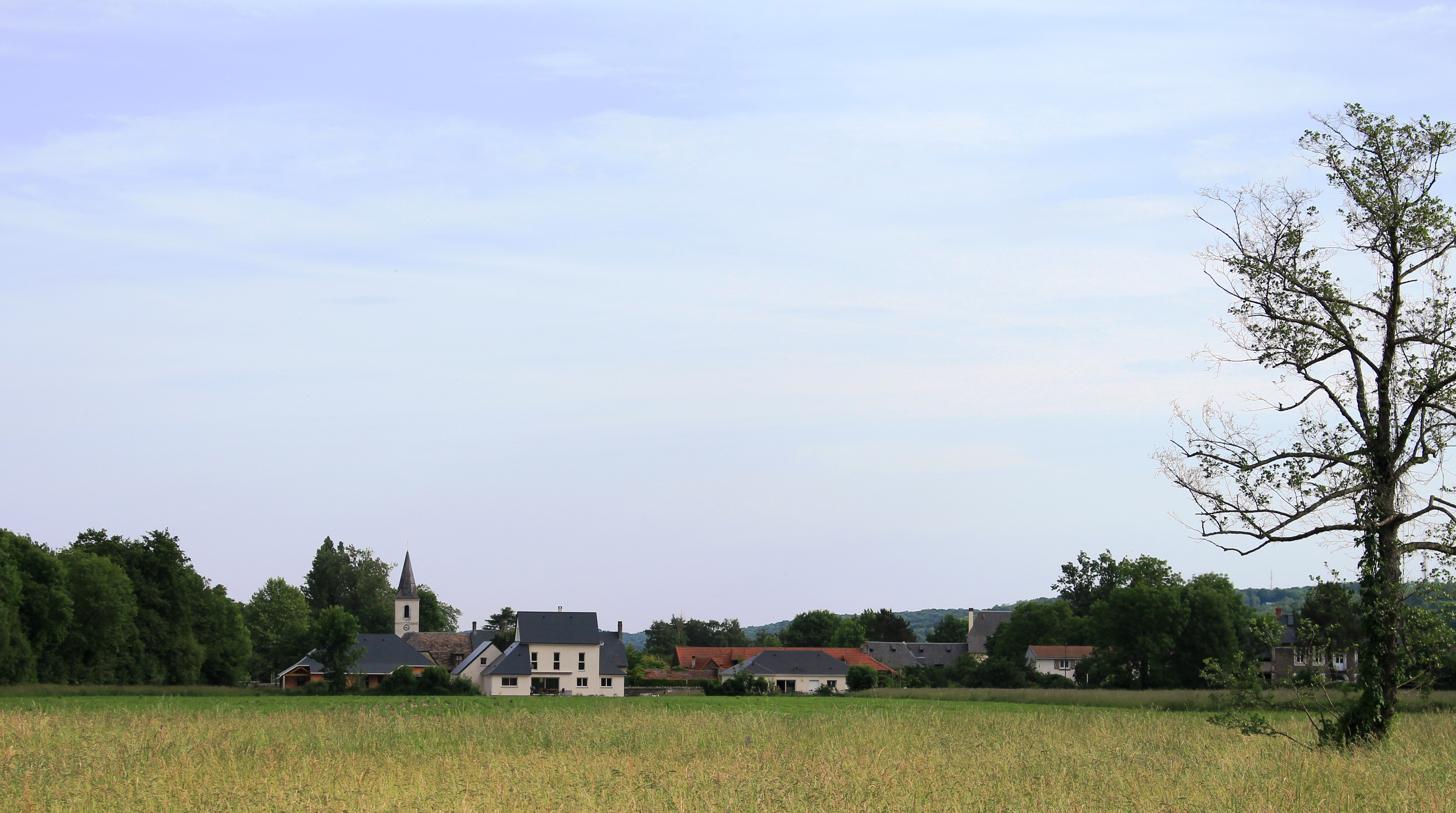
- View of ville Allier

- Coat of arms
- Location of Allier
- Location within France Location within Occitanie
- Coordinates: 43°10′41″N 0°07′24″E
- Country: France
- Region: Occitania
- Department: Hautes-Pyrénées
- Arrondissement: Tarbes
- Canton: Moyen Adour
- Intercommunality: CA Tarbes-Lourdes-Pyrénées

Government
  - Mayor (2020–2026): Jean-Philippe Baklouti
- Area^{1}: 3.69 km^{2} (1.42 sq mi)
- Elevation: 398 m (1,306 ft)
- Highest elevation: 503 m (1,650 ft)
- Lowest elevation: 368 m (1,207 ft)
- Population (2023): 446
  - Density: 121/km^{2} (313/sq mi)
- Time zone: UTC+01:00 (CET)
  - Summer (DST): UTC+02:00 (CEST)
- INSEE/Postal code: 65005 /65360
- ^{1} French Land Register data, which excludes lakes, ponds, glaciers > 1 km^{2} (0.386 sq mi or 247 acres) and river estuaries.

Allier (French pronunciation: [alje]; Occitan: Alièr) is a commune in the Hautes-Pyrénées department in southwestern France.

== Population ==
Historical population
Year	Pop.	±% p.a.
1968	106	—
1975	194	+9.02%
1982	232	+2.59%
1990	220	−0.66%
1999	264	+2.05%
2007	377	+4.55%
2012	387	+0.52%
2017	411	+1.21%
2023	446	+1.37%
Source: INSEE

== See also ==
- Communes of the Hautes-Pyrénées department
