= Insulin index =

Number assigned to food

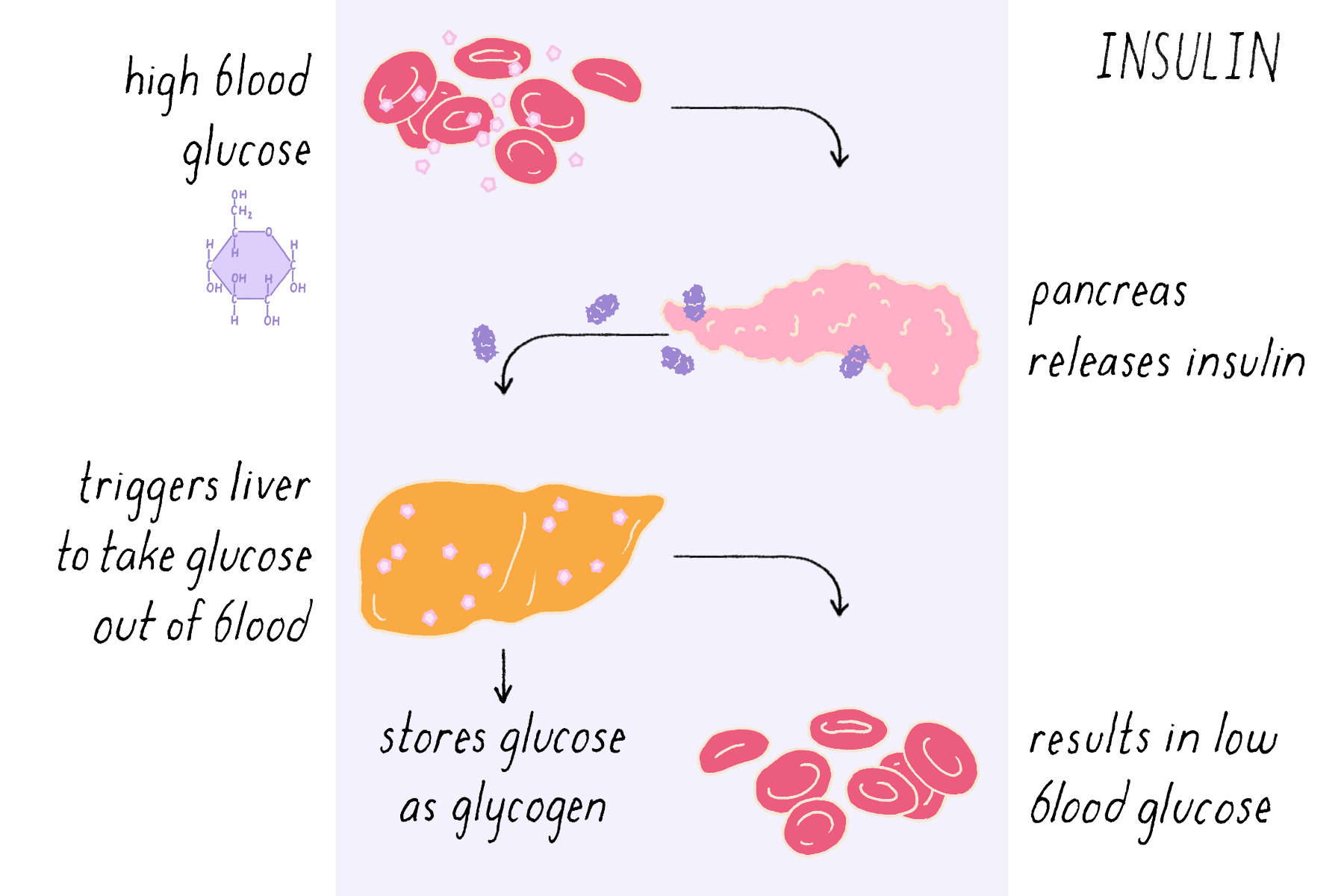
Insulin regulates the body’s use of sugar. When blood sugar levels are too high, it promotes storage of sugar in the liver. People with diabetes either can’t make insulin or can’t sense it at normal levels.

The insulin index of food represents how much it elevates the concentration of insulin in the blood during the two-hour period after the food is ingested. The index is similar to the glycemic index (GI) and glycemic load (GL), but rather than relying on blood glucose levels, the Insulin Index is based upon blood insulin levels. The Insulin Index represents a comparison of food portions with equal overall caloric content (250 kcal or 1000 kJ), while GI represents a comparison of portions with equal digestible carbohydrate content (typically 50 g) and the GL represents portions of a typical serving size for various foods. The Insulin Index can be more useful than either the glycemic index or the glycemic load because certain foods (e.g., lean meats and proteins) cause an insulin response despite there being no carbohydrates present, and some foods cause a disproportionate insulin response relative to their carbohydrate load.

Holt et al. have noted that the glucose and insulin scores of most foods are highly correlated, but high-protein foods and bakery products that are rich in fat and refined carbohydrates "elicit insulin responses that were disproportionately higher than their glycemic responses." They also conclude that insulin indices may be useful for dietary management and avoidance of non-insulin-dependent diabetes mellitus and hyperlipidemia.

== List ==
In the table below, glycemic and insulin scores show the increase in the blood concentration of each. The Insulin Index is not the same as a glycemic index (GI), which is based exclusively on the digestible carbohydrate content of food, and represents a comparison of foods in amounts with equal digestible carbohydrate content (typically 50 g). The insulin index compares foods in amounts with equal overall caloric content (240 kcal or 1000 kJ). Insulin indexes are scaled relative to white bread, while glycemic index scores nowadays are usually scaled with respect to pure glucose, although in the past white bread has been a reference point for GI measurements as well. A higher satiety value indicates increase of satiety after eating a serving of equal overall caloric content, scaled relative to white bread.

Mean average glucose, insulin and satiety scores
Food	Food Type	Glycemic score	Insulin score	Satiety value
All-Bran	Breakfast cereal	40 ± 7	32 ± 4	151
Porridge	Breakfast cereal	60 ± 12	40 ± 4	209
Muesli	Breakfast cereal	43 ± 7	46 ± 5	100
Special K	Breakfast cereal	70 ± 9	66 ± 5	116
Honeysmacks	Breakfast cereal	60 ± 7	67 ± 6	132
Sustain	Breakfast cereal	66 ± 6	71 ± 6	112
Cornflakes	Breakfast cereal	76 ± 11	75 ± 8	118
Average:	Breakfast cereal	59 ± 3	57 ± 3	134
White bread (baseline)	Carbohydrate-rich	100 ± 0	100 ± 0	100
White pasta	Carbohydrate-rich	46 ± 10	40 ± 5	119
Brown pasta	Carbohydrate-rich	68 ± 10	40 ± 5	188
Grain bread (Note: Rye bread containing 47% kibbled rye, Holt et al.)	Carbohydrate-rich	60 ± 12	56 ± 6	154
Brown rice	Carbohydrate-rich	104 ± 18	62 ± 11	132
French fries	Carbohydrate-rich	71 ± 16	74 ± 12	116
White rice	Carbohydrate-rich	110 ± 15	79 ± 12	138
Whole-meal bread (Note: Bread made from whole-meal wheat flour, Holt et al.)	Carbohydrate-rich	97 ± 17	96 ± 12	157
Potatoes	Carbohydrate-rich	141 ± 35	121 ± 11	323
Average:	Carbohydrate-rich	88 ± 6	74 ± 8	158.6
Eggs	Protein-rich	42 ± 16	31 ± 6	150
Cheese	Protein-rich	55 ± 18	45 ± 13	146
Beef	Protein-rich	21 ± 8	51 ± 16	176
Lentils in tomato sauce	Protein-rich	62 ± 22	58 ± 12	133
Fish	Protein-rich	28 ± 13	59 ± 18	225
Baked beans in tomato sauce	Protein-rich	114 ± 18	120 ± 19	168
Average:	Protein-rich	54 ± 7	61 ± 7	166.3
Apples	Fruit	50 ± 6	59 ± 4	197
Oranges	Fruit	39 ± 7	60 ± 3	202
Bananas	Fruit	79 ± 10	81 ± 5	118
Grapes	Fruit	74 ± 9	82 ± 6	162
Average:	Fruit	61 ± 5	71 ± 3	169.75
Peanuts	Snack/confectionery	12 ± 4	20 ± 5	84
Popcorn	Snack/confectionery	62 ± 16	54 ± 9	154
Potato chips	Snack/confectionery	52 ± 9	61 ± 14	91
Ice cream	Snack/confectionery	70 ± 19	89 ± 13	96
Low Fat Strawberry Yogurt	Snack/confectionery	62 ± 15	115 ± 13	88
Mars Bars	Snack/confectionery	79 ± 13	122 ± 15	70
Jellybeans	Snack/confectionery	118 ± 18	160 ± 16	118 (Note: the authors of the satiety study stated that the amount of jellybeans consumed tended to make participants nauseated which may have produced an erroneous satiety value.)
Average:	Snack/confectionery	65 ± 6	89 ± 7	100.1
Doughnuts	Bakery product	63 ± 12	74 ± 9	68
Croissants	Bakery product	74 ± 9	79 ± 14	47
Cake	Bakery product	56 ± 14	82 ± 12	65
Crackers	Bakery product	118 ± 24	87 ± 12	127
Cookies	Bakery product	74 ± 11	92 ± 15	120
Average:	Bakery product	77 ± 7	83 ± 5	85.4
Average:	Average	67.333 ± 5.7	72.5 ± 6	135.7
Average:	ALL	68.8 ± 12.7105	72 ± 9.5	136

Glucose (glycemic) and insulin scores were determined by feeding 1000 kilojoules (239 kilocalories) of the food to the participants and recording the area under the glucose/insulin curve for 120 minutes then dividing by the area under the glucose/insulin curve for white bread. The result being that all scores are relative to white bread. The satiety value was determined by comparing how satiated participants felt within two hours after being fed a fixed number of calories (240 kilocalories) of a particular food while blindfolded (to ensure food appearance was not a factor), then dividing that number by how satiated the participants felt after eating white bread. White bread serves as the baseline of 100. In other words, foods scoring higher than 100 are more satisfying than white bread and those under 100 are less satisfying. The satiety value was negatively correlated to the amount eaten by participants at a subsequent buffet.

± indicate uncertainty in the data. For example 60 ± 12 means that there's a 95% chance the score is between 60-12 (48) and 60+12 (72), 60 being the highest probability assuming a bell curve. In practice, this means that if two foods have large uncertainty and have values close together then it is difficult to distinguish which score is higher.

== See also ==
- Disposition index
- Glycemic index
- Glycemic load
- Insulin oscillations
