= Horgues =

- Commune
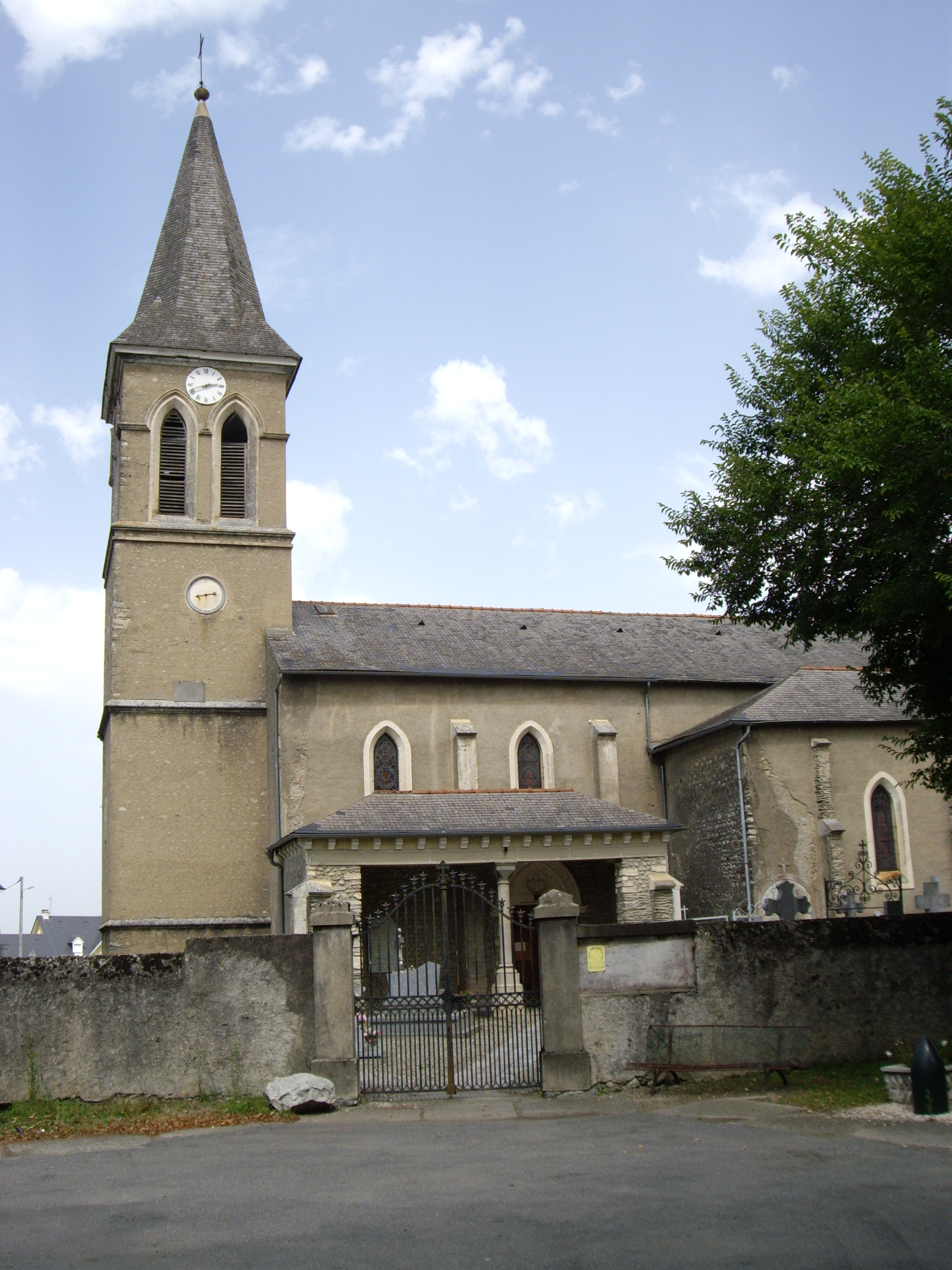
- The church of Saint-Mauront

- Coat of arms
- Location of Horgues
- Location within France Location within Occitanie
- Coordinates: 43°11′21″N 0°05′21″E
- Country: France
- Region: Occitania
- Department: Hautes-Pyrénées
- Arrondissement: Tarbes
- Canton: Moyen Adour
- Intercommunality: CA Tarbes-Lourdes-Pyrénées

Government
  - Mayor (2020–2026): Jean-Michel Ségneré
- Area^{1}: 4.49 km^{2} (1.73 sq mi)
- Elevation: 360 m (1,180 ft)
- Highest elevation: 373 m (1,224 ft)
- Lowest elevation: 342 m (1,122 ft)
- Population (2023): 1,287
  - Density: 287/km^{2} (742/sq mi)
- Time zone: UTC+01:00 (CET)
  - Summer (DST): UTC+02:00 (CEST)
- INSEE/Postal code: 65223 /65310
- ^{1} French Land Register data, which excludes lakes, ponds, glaciers > 1 km^{2} (0.386 sq mi or 247 acres) and river estuaries.

Horgues (French pronunciation: [ɔʁɡ]; Occitan: Hòrgas) is a commune in the Hautes-Pyrénées department in south-western France.

== See also ==
- Communes of the Hautes-Pyrénées department
