= John Rollo =

Scottish military surgeon

John Rollo M.D. (d. 23 December 1809) was a Scottish military surgeon, now known for his work on a diabetic diet. Rollo was the first to suggest a low-carbohydrate diet as a treatment for diabetes.

== Life ==
He was born in Scotland, and received his medical education at Edinburgh. He became a surgeon in the Royal Artillery in 1776, and then served in the West Indies. In 1778 the University of St Andrews made him M.D. He was stationed in St. Lucia in 1778–9 and in Barbados in 1781. His associates included Colin Chisholm on Grenada.

Rollo became surgeon-general of the Royal Artillery in 1794, and returned to the Royal Military Academy, Woolwich. There he oversaw the construction of the enlarged Royal Artillery Hospital: the Royal Ordnance Hospital dated from about 1780, and the enlargement was completed in 1806 (the building later became the Connaught Barracks). From 1804 he was inspector of hospitals for the Ordnance.

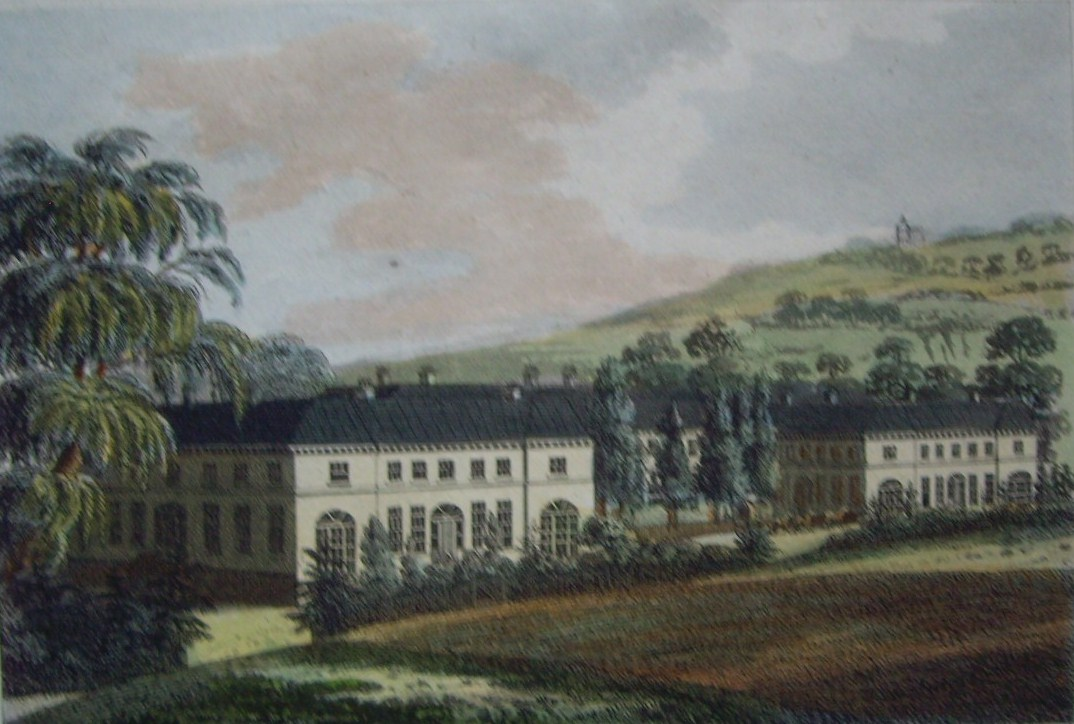
Royal Artillery Hospital, engraving inscribed to John Rollo

Rollo was frequently consulted about cases of diabetes, and in treatment had some success with the use of a nitrogenous diet. He died at Woolwich on 23 December 1809, and was buried at Plumstead in Greenwich.

== Diabetes ==
In 1797, Rollo printed at Deptford Notes of a Diabetic Case, which described the improvement of an officer with diabetes who was placed on a meat diet. He was the first to take Matthew Dobson's discovery of glycosuria in diabetes mellitus and apply it to managing metabolism. By means of Dobson's testing procedure (for glucose in the urine) Rollo worked out a diet that had success for what is now called type 2 diabetes. The addition of the term "mellitus", distinguishing the condition from diabetes insipidus, has been attributed to Rollo.

Rollo's diet for diabetic patients consisted of "milk, lime water, bread and butter, blood pudding, meat, and rancid fat". He has been described as "the first one to recommend a diet low in carbohydrates as a treatment for diabetes."

Rollo collaborated with William Cruickshank, who was the chemistry assistant at Woolwich. In another edition of the work, An Account of Two Cases of the Diabetes Mellitus, published in 1798, other cases were added, and some of Cruikshank's research on urine and sugar in diabetics was included. A further edition appeared in 1806. John Latham supported Rollo's views on the treatment. In 1824 the Encyclopædia Britannica in its article "Dietetics" commented that the diet was successful in repressing the condition of the patients' urine, but that the patients often found the high fat content intolerable. This kind of dietary management continued to the 1920s, being more successful for adults, who might survive some years, than for young patients who typically had only some months of life on it. Other collaborations of Rollo and Cruikshank related to treatments for syphilis involving acids, and published with the work on diabetes; proteinuria; and strontium.

== Other work ==
Rollo published Observations on the Diseases in the Army on St. Lucia, in 1781; and in 1785 Remarks on the Disease lately described by Dr. Hendy, on a form of elephantiasis known as "Barbados leg". In 1786 he published Observations on the Acute Dysentery.

Rollo published in 1801 a Short Account of the Royal Artillery Hospital at Woolwich. He had kept a record of his cases in Barbados, and the Account included a similar table for the Ordnance hospital. In 1804 a Medical Report on Cases of Inoculation supported the views of Edward Jenner.
