= Montignac, Hautes-Pyrénées =

Montignac
- Commune
- Coat of arms
- Location of Montignac
- Location within France Location within Occitanie
- Coordinates: 43°11′06″N 0°09′03″E
- Country: France
- Region: Occitania
- Department: Hautes-Pyrénées
- Arrondissement: Tarbes
- Canton: Moyen Adour
- Intercommunality: CA Tarbes-Lourdes-Pyrénées

Government
  - Mayor (2020–2026): Rémi Carmouze
- Area^{1}: 1.07 km^{2} (0.41 sq mi)
- Elevation: 500 m (1,600 ft)
- Highest elevation: 486 m (1,594 ft)
- Lowest elevation: 364 m (1,194 ft)
- Population (2023): 135
  - Density: 126/km^{2} (327/sq mi)
- Time zone: UTC+01:00 (CET)
  - Summer (DST): UTC+02:00 (CEST)
- INSEE/Postal code: 65321 /65690
- ^{1} French Land Register data, which excludes lakes, ponds, glaciers > 1 km^{2} (0.386 sq mi or 247 acres) and river estuaries.

Montignac (French pronunciation: [mɔ̃tiɲak]; Occitan: Montinhac) is a commune in the Hautes-Pyrénées department in south-western France.

== See also ==
- Communes of the Hautes-Pyrénées department
