= Barbazan-Debat =

- Commune
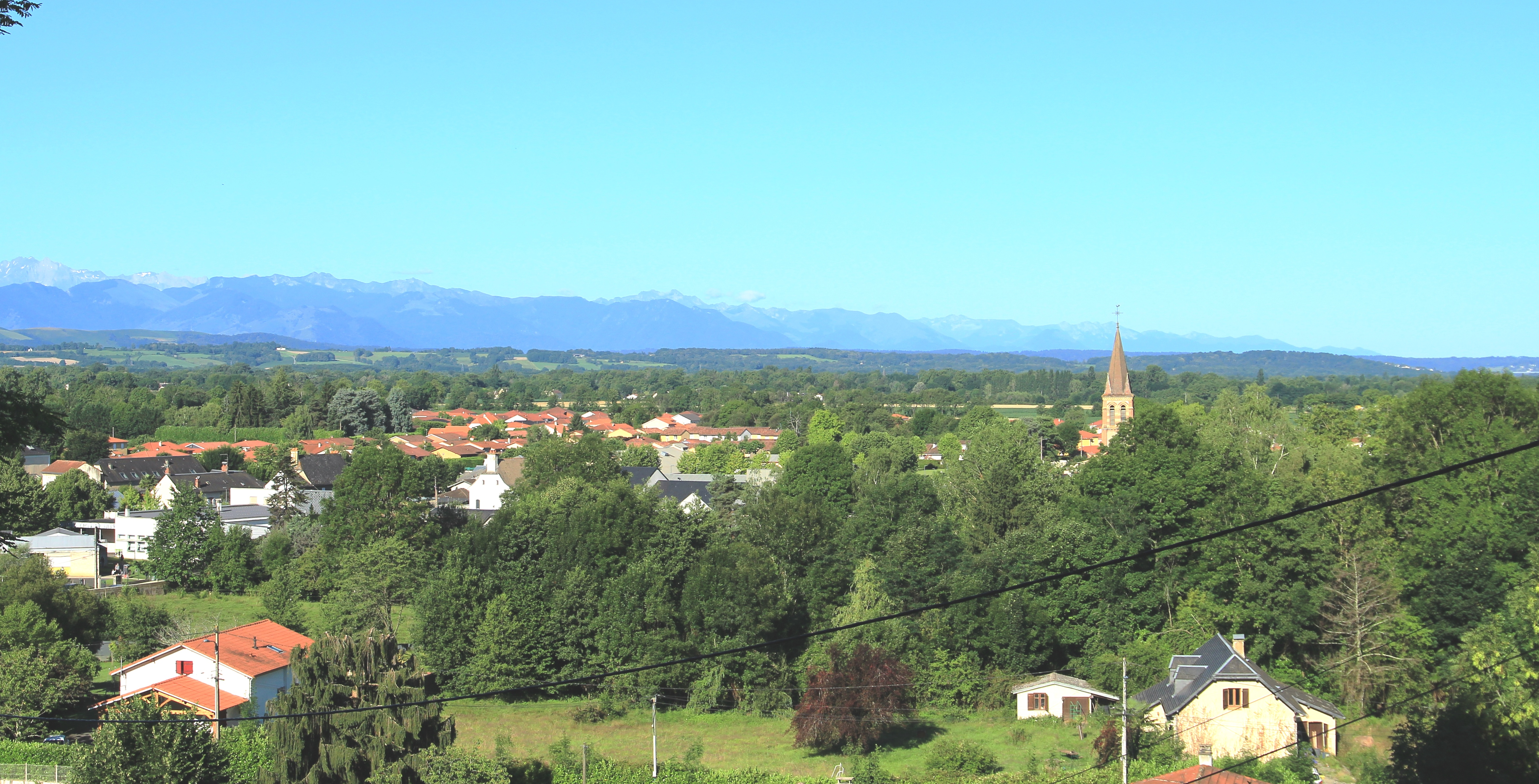

- Coat of arms
- Location of Barbazan-Debat
- Location within France Location within Occitanie
- Coordinates: 43°11′45″N 0°07′14″E
- Country: France
- Region: Occitania
- Department: Hautes-Pyrénées
- Arrondissement: Tarbes
- Canton: Moyen Adour
- Intercommunality: CA Tarbes-Lourdes-Pyrénées

Government
  - Mayor (2020–2026): Jean-Christian Pédeboy
- Area^{1}: 9.78 km^{2} (3.78 sq mi)
- Elevation: 343 m (1,125 ft)
- Highest elevation: 470 m (1,540 ft)
- Lowest elevation: 336 m (1,102 ft)
- Population (2023): 3,478
  - Density: 356/km^{2} (921/sq mi)
- Time zone: UTC+01:00 (CET)
  - Summer (DST): UTC+02:00 (CEST)
- INSEE/Postal code: 65062 /65690
- ^{1} French Land Register data, which excludes lakes, ponds, glaciers > 1 km^{2} (0.386 sq mi or 247 acres) and river estuaries.

Barbazan-Debat is a commune in the Hautes-Pyrénées department in southwestern France.

== Population ==
Historical population
Year	Pop.	±% p.a.
1968	744	—
1975	1,365	+9.06%
1982	3,204	+12.96%
1990	3,536	+1.24%
1999	3,504	−0.10%
2007	3,382	−0.44%
2012	3,446	+0.38%
2017	3,463	+0.10%
2023	3,478	+0.07%
Source: INSEE

== See also ==
- Communes of the Hautes-Pyrénées department
