= Bernac-Dessus =

- Commune
- Coat of arms
- Location of Bernac-Dessus
- Location within France Location within Occitanie
- Coordinates: 43°09′40″N 0°06′56″E
- Country: France
- Region: Occitania
- Department: Hautes-Pyrénées
- Arrondissement: Tarbes
- Canton: Moyen Adour
- Intercommunality: CA Tarbes-Lourdes-Pyrénées

Government
  - Mayor (2020–2026): Joël Cazedebat
- Area^{1}: 4.6 km^{2} (1.8 sq mi)
- Elevation: 398 m (1,306 ft)
- Highest elevation: 527 m (1,729 ft)
- Lowest elevation: 394 m (1,293 ft)
- Population (2023): 282
  - Density: 61/km^{2} (160/sq mi)
- Time zone: UTC+01:00 (CET)
  - Summer (DST): UTC+02:00 (CEST)
- INSEE/Postal code: 65084 /65360
- ^{1} French Land Register data, which excludes lakes, ponds, glaciers > 1 km^{2} (0.386 sq mi or 247 acres) and river estuaries.

Bernac-Dessus (French pronunciation: [bɛʁnak dəsy]; Occitan: Bernac Dessús) is a commune in the Hautes-Pyrénées department in southwestern France.

== Population ==
Historical population
Year	Pop.	±% p.a.
1968	179	—
1975	220	+2.99%
1982	257	+2.25%
1990	278	+0.99%
1999	325	+1.75%
2007	311	−0.55%
2012	291	−1.32%
2017	294	+0.21%
2023	282	−0.69%
Source: INSEE

== See also ==
- Communes of the Hautes-Pyrénées department
