= Carbohydrate counting =

Meal planning tool in diabetes management

Carbohydrate counting or "carb" counting is a meal planning tool used in diabetes management to help optimize blood sugar control. It can be used with or without the use of insulin therapy. Carbohydrate counting involves determining whether a food item has carbohydrate followed by the subsequent determination of how much carbohydrate the food item has in it.

== Purpose ==
Carbohydrate is one of three major macronutrients found in food. The other major macronutrients are protein and fat. Carbohydrate in its simplest form is known as glucose and can contribute to a rise in blood sugar. In people with diabetes, the body's ability to keep blood sugar at a normal level is impaired. Dietary management of carbohydrate consumed is one tool used to help optimize blood sugar levels.

Carbohydrate is found in a number of foods including fruits, starchy vegetables (such as peas, potatoes, and corn), grains, milk and yogurt, legumes, and desserts. In general, foods such as meat, eggs, cheese, fats, and non-starchy vegetables (such as greens and broccoli) have little to no carbohydrate. Other foods free of carbohydrate include small quantities of certain condiments, unsweetened coffee and tea, and sugar free sodas.

Carbohydrate content of foods is listed on the Nutrition Facts panel as "total carbohydrate". Some food labels will list specific types of carbohydrate, such as "fiber, sugar, or other carbohydrate". With carbohydrate counting, the "total carbohydrate" is used as the carbohydrate amount. Carbohydrate counting can be done by either adding up grams of total carbohydrate or adding "carbohydrate units". A carbohydrate unit is simply 15 g of carbohydrate.

== Method ==
Carbohydrate counting can be used with or without insulin therapy.

=== Without insulin ===
When carbohydrate counting is used without insulin, it can be used as a tool to manage blood sugar levels. A certain number of carbohydrate grams or carbohydrate units is consumed with each meal and with each snack. In keeping the carbohydrate at a certain level, the blood sugar is able to remain within a normal level. The American Diabetes Association recommends starting at around 45–60 carbohydrate grams (3–4 carb units) at each meal, with potential to increase or decrease that amount.

=== With insulin ===
Carbohydrate counting may be used with either a fixed insulin dosage or with a more flexible insulin dosage. Carb counting for fixed insulin dosage is done in the same manner as carbohydrate counting without insulin. The only difference is that insulin is administered with the meal. With more flexible insulin dosage, the insulin is administered in regards to the amount of carbohydrate consumed. The insulin amount will vary based on the amount of carbohydrates consumed.
