= Bernac-Debat =

- Commune
- Coat of arms
- Location of Bernac-Debat
- Location within France Location within Occitanie
- Coordinates: 43°10′04″N 0°06′34″E
- Country: France
- Region: Occitania
- Department: Hautes-Pyrénées
- Arrondissement: Tarbes
- Canton: Moyen Adour
- Intercommunality: CA Tarbes-Lourdes-Pyrénées

Government
  - Mayor (2020–2026): Anne Ginestet-Soulié
- Area^{1}: 3.9 km^{2} (1.5 sq mi)
- Elevation: 383 m (1,257 ft)
- Highest elevation: 463 m (1,519 ft)
- Lowest elevation: 367 m (1,204 ft)
- Population (2023): 743
  - Density: 190/km^{2} (490/sq mi)
- Time zone: UTC+01:00 (CET)
  - Summer (DST): UTC+02:00 (CEST)
- INSEE/Postal code: 65083 /65360
- ^{1} French Land Register data, which excludes lakes, ponds, glaciers > 1 km^{2} (0.386 sq mi or 247 acres) and river estuaries.

Bernac-Debat is a commune in the Hautes-Pyrénées department in southwestern France.

== Population ==
Historical population
Year	Pop.	±% p.a.
1968	439	—
1975	503	+1.96%
1982	461	−1.24%
1990	528	+1.71%
1999	557	+0.60%
2007	621	+1.37%
2012	665	+1.38%
2017	683	+0.54%
2023	743	+1.41%
Source: INSEE

== See also ==
- Communes of the Hautes-Pyrénées department
