= Glycemic efficacy =

Outcome of regulated glycemic levels on diabetes and heart disease

Glycemic efficacy refers to the capacity of regulated glycemic levels to produce an effect in people with diabetes and heart disease. According to Zeev Vlodaver, Robert F. Wilson and Daniel J. Garry, "exenatide and liraglutide are synthetic GLP-1 agonists and have demonstrated glycemic efficacy (HbA1c reductions of between 0.7 and 2%) associated with mild weight loss." Glyburide, metformin and rosiglitazone have been assessed as a monotherapy in the durability of glycemic efficacy.
