= Jardin Massey =

Coordinates: 43.2380°N 0.0761°E

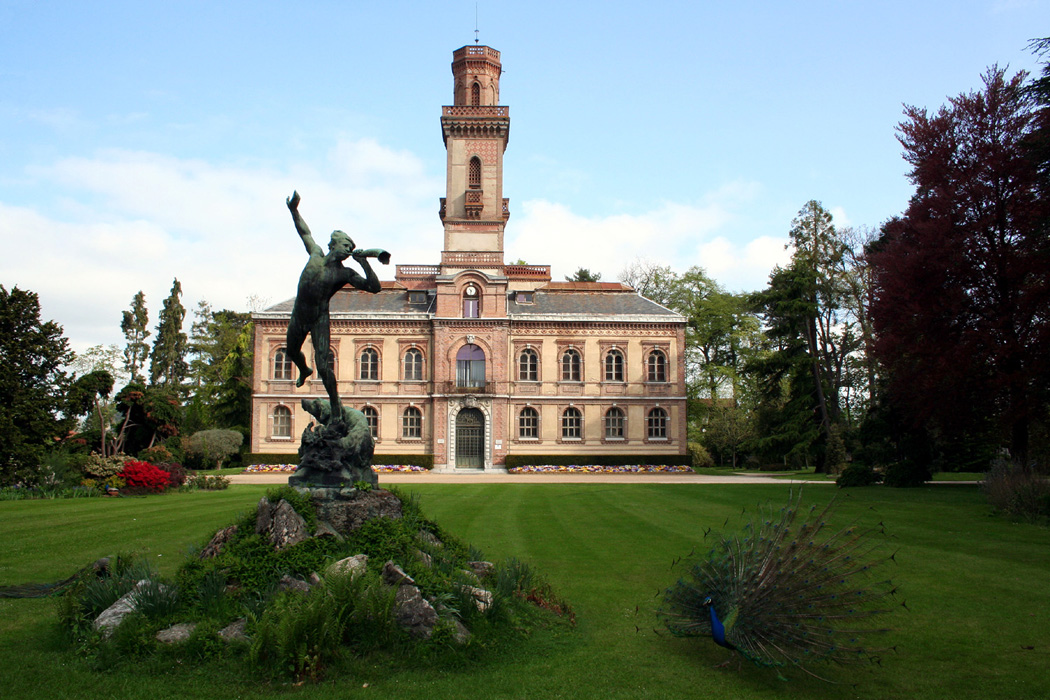
The museum and the garden

Jardin Massey is a public garden in Tarbes, France built in the 19th century by Placide Massey (1777-1853), horticulturist of the French King Louis Philippe I and previous chief of the Palace of Versailles' gardens.

The Jardin Massey has been put on the list of the Remarkable Gardens of France by the French government in 2004.

The garden contains several interesting buildings such as:

- the Musée Massey (international Hussar museum),
- the orangery,
- the cloister (bought from the abbey of Saint-Sever-de-Rustan),
- the School of art and ceramics.

The garden also contains rare or interesting trees, flowers, and animals.
