= Myokine =

Class of proteins produced by muscle

A myokine is one of several hundred cytokines or other small proteins (~5–20 kDa) and proteoglycan peptides that are produced and released by skeletal muscle cells (muscle fibers) in response to muscular contractions. They have autocrine, paracrine and/or endocrine effects; their systemic effects occur at picomolar concentrations.

Receptors for myokines are found on muscle, fat, liver, pancreas, bone, heart, immune, and brain cells. The location of these receptors reflects the fact that myokines have multiple functions. Foremost, they are involved in exercise-associated metabolic changes, as well as in the metabolic changes following training adaptation. They also participate in tissue regeneration and repair, maintenance of healthy bodily functioning, immunomodulation; and cell signaling, expression and differentiation.

== History ==
The definition and use of the term myokine first occurred in 2003. In 2008, the first myokine, myostatin, was identified. The gp130 receptor cytokine IL-6 (Interleukin 6) was the first myokine found to be secreted into the blood stream in response to muscle contractions.

== Secretion ==
=== In repetitive skeletal muscle contractions ===
There is an emerging understanding of skeletal muscle as a secretory organ, and of myokines as mediators of physical fitness through the practice of regular physical exercise (aerobic exercise and strength training), as well as new awareness of the anti-inflammatory and thus disease prevention aspects of exercise. Different muscle fiber types – slow twitch muscle fibers, oxidative muscle fibers, intermediate twitch muscle fibers, and fast twitch muscle fibers – release different clusters of myokines during contraction. This implies that variation of exercise types, particularly aerobic training/endurance training and muscle contraction against resistance (strength training) may offer differing myokine-induced benefits.

== Functions ==
"Some myokines exert their effects within the muscle itself. Thus, myostatin, LIF, IL-6 and IL-7 are involved in muscle hypertrophy and myogenesis, whereas BDNF and IL-6 are involved in AMPK-mediated fat oxidation. IL-6 also appears to have systemic effects on the liver, adipose tissue and the immune system, and mediates crosstalk between intestinal L cells and pancreatic islets. Other myokines include the osteogenic factors IGF-1 and FGF-2; FSTL-1, which improves the endothelial function of the vascular system; and the PGC-1alpha-dependent myokine irisin, which drives brown fat-like development. Studies in the past few years suggest the existence of yet unidentified factors, secreted from muscle cells, which may influence cancer cell growth and pancreas function. Many proteins produced by skeletal muscle are dependent upon contraction; therefore, physical inactivity probably leads to an altered myokine response, which could provide a potential mechanism for the association between sedentary behaviour and many chronic diseases."

=== In brain functions related to neuroplasticity, memory, sleep and mood ===
Physical exercise rapidly triggers substantial changes at the organismal level, including the secretion of myokines and metabolites by muscle cells. For instance, aerobic exercise in humans leads to significant structural alterations in the brain, while wheel-running in rodents promotes neurogenesis and improves synaptic transmission in particular in the hippocampus. Moreover, physical exercise triggers histone modifications and protein synthesis which ultimately positively influence mood and cognitive abilities. Notably, regular exercise is somewhat associated with a better sleep quality, which could be mediated by the muscle secretome.

=== In regulating heart architecture ===
Heart muscle is subject to two kinds of stress: physiologic stress, i.e. exercise; and pathologic stress, i.e. disease related. Likewise, the heart has two potential responses to either stress: cardiac hypertrophy, which is a normal, physiologic, adaptive growth; or cardiac remodeling, which is an abnormal, pathologic, maladaptive growth. Upon being subjected to either stress, the heart "chooses" to turn on one of the responses and turn off the other. If it has chosen the abnormal path, i.e. remodeling, exercise can reverse this choice by turning off remodeling and turning on hypertrophy. The mechanism for reversing this choice is the microRNA miR-222 in cardiac muscle cells, which exercise up-regulates via unknown myokines. miR-222 represses genes involved in fibrosis and cell-cycle control.

=== In immunomodulation ===
Immunomodulation and immunoregulation were a particular focus of early myokine research, as, according to Dr. Bente Klarlund Pedersen and her colleagues, "the interactions between exercise and the immune system provided a unique opportunity to evaluate the role of underlying endocrine and cytokine mechanisms."

Muscle has an impact on the trafficking and inflammation of lymphocytes and neutrophils. During exercise, both neutrophils and NK cells and other lymphocytes enter the blood. Long-duration, high-intensity exercise leads to a decrease in the number of lymphocytes, while the concentration of neutrophils increases through mechanisms including adrenaline and cortisol. Interleukin-6 (IL-6) has been shown to mediate the increase in cortisol: IL-6 stimulates the production of cortisol and therefore induces leukocytosis and lymphocytopenia.

== Specific myokines ==
=== Myostatin ===
Both aerobic exercise and strength training (resistance exercise) attenuate myostatin expression, and myostatin inactivation potentiates the beneficial effects of endurance exercise on metabolism.

=== Interleukins ===
Aerobic exercise provokes a systemic cytokine response, including, for example, IL-6, IL-1 receptor antagonist (IL-1ra), and IL-10 (Interleukin 10) and the concentrations of chemokines, IL-8, macrophage inflammatory protein α (MIP-1α), MIP-1β, and MCP-1 rise after vigorous exercise. IL-6 was identified as a myokine based on the observation that it increased in an exponential fashion proportional to the length of exercise and the amount of muscle mass engaged in the exercise. This increase is followed by the appearance of IL-1ra and the anti-inflammatory cytokine IL-10. In general, the cytokine response to exercise and sepsis differs with regard to TNF-α. Thus, the cytokine response to exercise is not preceded by an increase in plasma-TNF-α. Following exercise, the basal plasma IL-6 concentration may increase up to 100-fold, but less dramatic increases are more frequent. The exercise-induced increase of plasma IL-6 occurs in an exponential manner and the peak IL-6 level is reached at the end of the exercise or shortly thereafter. It is the combination of mode, intensity, and duration of the exercise that determines the magnitude of the exercise-induced increase of plasma IL-6.

=== Interleukin 6 ===
As studies have demonstrated Interleukin 6 has pro-inflammatory functions when evaluated in regard to sepsis and obesity, it was initially hypothesized that the exercise-induced IL-6 response was related to muscle damage. However, a recent study suggests that eccentric exercise is not associated with a larger increase in plasma IL-6 than exercise involving concentric "nondamaging" muscle contractions. This finding supports the hypothesis that muscle damage is not required to provoke an increase in plasma IL-6 during exercise.

IL-6, among an increasing number of other recently identified myokines, remains an important topic of myokine research. It appears in muscle tissue and in the circulation during exercise at levels up to one hundred times basal rates, as noted, and may have a beneficial impact on health and bodily functioning with transient increases as P. Munoz-Canoves et al. write:

It appears consistently in the literature that IL-6, produced locally by different cell types, has a positive impact on the proliferative capacity of muscle stem cells. This physiological mechanism functions to provide enough muscle progenitors in situations that require a high number of these cells, such as during the processes of muscle regeneration and hypertrophic growth after an acute stimulus. IL-6 is also the founding member of the myokine family of muscle-produced cytokines. Indeed, muscle-produced IL-6 after repeated contractions also has important autocrine and paracrine benefits, acting as a myokine, in regulating energy metabolism, controlling, for example, metabolic functions and stimulating glucose production. It is important to note that these positive effects of IL-6 and other myokines are normally associated with its transient production and short-term action.

=== Interleukin 15 ===
Interleukin-15 stimulates fat oxidation, glucose uptake, mitochondrial biogenesis and myogenesis in skeletal muscle and adipose tissue. In humans, basal concentrations of IL-15 and its alpha receptor (IL-15Rα) in blood have been inversely associated with physical inactivity and fat mass, particularly trunk fat mass. Moreover, in response to a single session of resistance exercise the IL-15/IL-15Rα complex has been related to myofibrillar protein synthesis (hypertrophy).

=== Brain-derived neurotrophic factor ===
Brain-derived neurotrophic factor (BDNF) is also a myokine, though BDNF produced by contracting muscle is not released into circulation. Rather, BDNF produced in skeletal muscle appears to enhance the oxidation of fat. Skeletal muscle activation through exercise also contributes to an increase in BDNF secretion in the brain. A beneficial effect of BDNF on neuronal function has been noted in multiple studies. Dr. Pedersen writes, "Neurotrophins are a family of structurally related growth factors, including brain-derived neurotrophic factor (BDNF), which exert many of their effects on neurons primarily through Trk receptor tyrosine kinases. Of these, BDNF and its receptor TrkB are most widely and abundantly expressed in the brain. However, recent studies show that BDNF is also expressed in non-neurogenic tissues, including skeletal muscle. BDNF has been shown to regulate neuronal development and to modulate synaptic plasticity. BDNF plays a key role in regulating survival, growth and maintenance of neurons, and BDNF has a bearing on learning and memory. However, BDNF has also been identified as a key component of the hypothalamic pathway that controls body mass and energy homeostasis.

"Most recently, we have shown that BDNF appears to be a major player not only in central metabolic pathways but also as a regulator of metabolism in skeletal muscle. Hippocampal samples from Alzheimer's disease donors show decreased BDNF expression and individuals with Alzheimer's disease have low plasma levels of BDNF. Also, patients with major depression have lower levels of serum BDNF than normal control subjects. Other studies suggest that plasma BDNF is a biomarker of impaired memory and general cognitive function in ageing women and a low circulating BDNF level was recently shown to be an independent and robust biomarker of mortality risk in old women. Low levels of circulating BDNF are also found in obese individuals and those with type 2 diabetes. In addition, we have demonstrated that there is a cerebral output of BDNF and that this is inhibited during hyperglycaemic clamp conditions in humans. This last finding may explain the concomitant finding of low circulating levels of BDNF in individuals with type 2 diabetes, and the association between low plasma BDNF and the severity of insulin resistance.

BDNF appears to play a role in both neurobiology and metabolism. Studies have demonstrated that physical exercise may increase circulating BDNF levels in humans. To identify whether the brain is a source of BDNF during exercise, eight volunteers rowed for 4 h while simultaneous blood samples were obtained from the radial artery and the internal jugular vein. To further identify the putative cerebral region(s) responsible for BDNF release, mouse brains were dissected and analysed for BDNF mRNA expression following treadmill exercise. In humans, a BDNF release from the brain was observed at rest and increased 2- to 3-fold during exercise. Both at rest and during exercise, the brain contributed 70–80% of the circulating BDNF, while this contribution decreased following 1 h of recovery. In mice, exercise induced a 3- to 5-fold increase in BDNF mRNA expression in the hippocampus and cortex, peaking 2 h after the termination of exercise. These results suggest that the brain is a major but not the sole contributor to circulating BDNF. Moreover, the importance of the cortex and hippocampus as sources of plasma BDNF becomes even more prominent in the response to exercise."

With respect to studies of exercise and brain function, a 2010 report is of particular interest. Erickson et al. have shown that the volume of the anterior hippocampus increased by 2% in response to aerobic training in a randomized controlled trial with 120 older adults. The authors also summarize several previously-established research findings relating to exercise and brain function: (1) Aerobic exercise training increases grey and white matter volume in the prefrontal cortex of older adults and increases the functioning of key nodes in the executive control network. (2) Greater amounts of physical activity have been associated with sparing of prefrontal and temporal brain regions over a 9-y period, which reduces the risk for cognitive impairment. (3) Hippocampal and medial temporal lobe volumes are larger in higher-fit older adults (larger hippocampal volumes have been demonstrated to mediate improvements in spatial memory). (4) Exercise training increases cerebral blood volume and perfusion of the hippocampus.

Regarding the 2010 study, the authors conclude: "We also demonstrate that increased hippocampal volume is associated with greater serum levels of BDNF, a mediator of neurogenesis in the dentate gyrus. Hippocampal volume declined in the control group, but higher preintervention fitness partially attenuated the decline, suggesting that fitness protects against volume loss. Caudate nucleus and thalamus volumes were unaffected by the intervention. These theoretically important findings indicate that aerobic exercise training is effective at reversing hippocampal volume loss in late adulthood, which is accompanied by improved memory function."

=== Decorin ===
Decorin is an example of a proteoglycan which functions as a myokine. Kanzleiter et al have established that this myokine is secreted during muscular contraction against resistance, and plays a role in muscle growth. They reported on July 1, 2014: "The small leucine-rich proteoglycan decorin has been described as a myokine for some time. However, its regulation and impact on skeletal muscle (had) not been investigated in detail. In (our recent) study, we report decorin to be differentially expressed and released in response to muscle contraction using different approaches. Decorin is released from contracting human myotubes, and circulating decorin levels are increased in response to acute resistance exercise in humans. Moreover, decorin expression in skeletal muscle is increased in humans and mice after chronic training. Because decorin directly binds myostatin, a potent inhibitor of muscle growth, we investigated a potential function of decorin in the regulation of skeletal muscle growth. In vivo overexpression of decorin in murine skeletal muscle promoted expression of the pro-myogenic factor Mighty, which is negatively regulated by myostatin. We also found Myod1 and follistatin to be increased in response to decorin overexpression. Moreover, muscle-specific ubiquitin ligases atrogin1 and MuRF1, which are involved in atrophic pathways, were reduced by decorin overexpression. In summary, our findings suggest that decorin secreted from myotubes in response to exercise is involved in the regulation of muscle hypertrophy and hence could play a role in exercise-related restructuring processes of skeletal muscle."

=== Irisin ===
==== Discovery ====
Irisin is a cleaved version of FNDC5. Boström and coworkers named the cleaved product irisin, after the Greek messenger goddess Iris. FNDC5 was initially discovered in 2002 by two independent groups of researchers.

==== Function ====
Irisin (fibronectin type III domain-containing protein 5 or FNDC5), a recently described myokine hormone produced and secreted by acutely exercising skeletal muscles, is thought to bind white adipose tissue cells via undetermined receptors. Irisin has been reported to promote a brown adipose tissue-like phenotype upon white adipose tissue by increasing cellular mitochondrial density and expression of uncoupling protein-1, thereby increasing adipose tissue energy expenditure via thermogenesis. This is considered important, because excess visceral adipose tissue in particular distorts the whole body energy homeostasis, increases the risk of cardiovascular disease and raises exposure to a milieu of adipose tissue-secreted hormones (adipokines) that promote inflammation and cellular aging. The authors enquired whether the favorable impact of irisin on white adipose tissue might be associated with maintenance of telomere length, a well-established genetic marker in the aging process. They conclude that these data support the view that irisin may have a role in the modulation not only of energy balance but also the aging process.

However, exogenous irisin may aid in heightening energy expenditure, and thus in reducing obesity. Boström et al. reported on December 14, 2012: "Since the conservation of calories would likely provide an overall survival advantage for mammals, it appears paradoxical that exercise would stimulate the secretion of a polypeptide hormone that increases thermogenesis and energy expenditure. One explanation for the increased irisin expression with exercise in mouse and man may have evolved as a consequence of muscle contraction during shivering. Muscle secretion of a hormone that activates adipose thermogenesis during this process might provide a broader, more robust defense against hypothermia. The therapeutic potential of irisin is obvious. Exogenously administered irisin induces the browning of subcutaneous fat and thermogenesis, and it presumably could be prepared and delivered as an injectable polypeptide. Increased formation of brown or beige/brite fat has been shown to have anti-obesity, anti-diabetic effects in multiple murine models, and adult humans have significant deposits of UCP1-positive brown fat. (Our data show) that even relatively short treatments of obese mice with irisin improves glucose homeostasis and causes a small weight loss. Whether longer treatments with irisin and/or higher doses would cause more weight loss remains to be determined. The worldwide, explosive increase in obesity and diabetes strongly suggests exploring the clinical utility of irisin in these and related disorders. Another potentially important aspect of this work relates to other beneficial effects of exercise, especially in some diseases for which no effective treatments exist. The clinical data linking exercise with health benefits in many other diseases suggests that irisin could also have significant effects in these disorders."

While the murine findings reported by Boström et al. appear encouraging, other researchers have questioned whether irisin operates in a similar manner in humans. For example, Timmons et al. noted that over 1,000 genes are upregulated by exercise and examined how expression of FNDC5 was affected by exercise in ~200 humans. They found that it was upregulated only in highly active elderly humans, casting doubt on the conclusions of Boström et al. Further discussion of this issue can be found in Irisin § Function.

=== Osteonectin (SPARC) ===
A novel myokine osteonectin, or SPARC (secreted protein acidic and rich in cysteine), plays a vital role in bone mineralization, cell-matrix interactions, and collagen binding. Osteonectin inhibits tumorigenesis in mice. Osteonectin can be classed as a myokine, as it was found that even a single bout of exercise increased its expression and secretion in skeletal muscle in both mice and humans.

=== PGC-1 ===
Peroxisome proliferator activated receptor gamma 1-alpha coactivator (PGC-1 alpha) is a specific myokine since it regulates kynurenine metabolism and stimulates satellite cells, but stimulates M1 and M2 macrophages; M1 macrophages release interleukin 6 (IL-6), Insulin growth factor type 1 (IGF-1) and vascular endothelial growth factor (VEGF), while M2 macrophages mainly secrete IGF-1, VEGF and monocyte chemoattractant protein 1 (MCP-1)) and all this process the muscle becomes muscle hypertrophy.

Macrophages M2 stimulate satellite cells for proliferation and growth but M1 stimulates blood vessels and produces pro-inflammatory cytokines only M2 produces anti-inflammatory in muscles.

=== Myokine in cancer treatments ===
The myokine oncostatin M has been shown to inhibit the proliferation of breast cancer cells, IL-6, IL-15, epinephrine and norepinephrine for the recruitment of NK cells and replacement of old neutrophils into new and more functional ones and limit induced inflammation by Macrophages M1 and increase in Macrophages M2 (anti-inflammatory).
