= UCPH =

UCPH may refer to:

- UCP2
- University of Copenhagen
