= Thermogenin =

Mammalian protein found in humans

UCP1

Identifiers
- Aliases: UCP1, SLC25A7, UCP, uncoupling protein 1
- External IDs: OMIM: 113730; MGI: 98894; GeneCards: UCP1

Gene location (Human)
Chr.	Chromosome 4 (human)
Band	4q31.1	Start	140,559,431 bp
Band	4q31.1	End	140,568,961 bp

Gene location (Mouse)
Chr.	Chromosome 8 (mouse)
Band	8 C2|8 39.65 cM	Start	84,016,981 bp
Band	8 C2|8 39.65 cM	End	84,025,081 bp
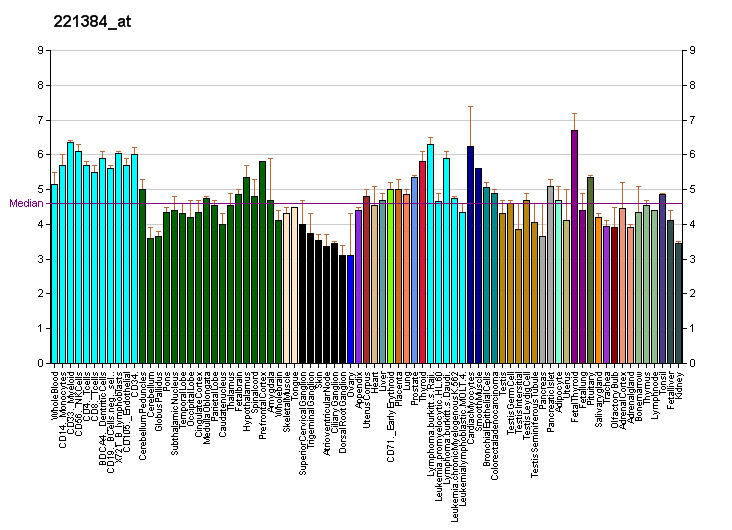
RNA expression pattern
Bgee	Human / Mouse (ortholog); Top expressed in: testicle; parietal pleura; face; mucosa of nose; Ventricular system of neuraxis; placenta; ventricular zone; olfactory zone of nasal mucosa; mammary gland; lactiferous gland / Top expressed in: intercostal muscle; parotid gland; superior surface of tongue; tunica adventitia of aorta; trachea; brown adipose tissue; sternocleidomastoid muscle; tunica media of zone of aorta; carotid body; ascending aorta; More reference expression data
BioGPS	More reference expression data
Gene ontology
Molecular function	transmembrane transporter activity; purine ribonucleotide binding; long-chain fatty acid binding; cardiolipin binding; oxidative phosphorylation uncoupler activity
Cellular component	mitochondrial envelope; membrane; mitochondrion; mitochondrial membranes; mitochondrial inner membrane; integral component of membrane
Biological process	regulation of transcription by RNA polymerase II; brown fat cell differentiation; diet induced thermogenesis; ion transport; response to temperature stimulus; response to nutrient levels; cellular response to hormone stimulus; cellular response to reactive oxygen species; cellular response to fatty acid; regulation of reactive oxygen species biosynthetic process; response to cold; mitochondrial transmembrane transport; adaptive thermogenesis; mitochondrial transport; proton transmembrane transport; positive regulation of cold-induced thermogenesis
Sources:Amigo / QuickGO
Orthologs
Databases	NCBI: entry; OMA: entry
Species	Human	Mouse
Entrez	7350	22227
Ensembl	ENSG00000109424	ENSMUSG00000031710
UniProt	P25874	P12242
RefSeq (mRNA)	NM_021833	NM_009463
RefSeq (protein)	NP_068605	NP_033489
Location (UCSC)	Chr 4: 140.56 – 140.57 Mb	Chr 8: 84.02 – 84.03 Mb
PubMed search
- Wikidata
View/Edit Human	View/Edit Mouse

Thermogenin (called uncoupling protein by its discoverers and now known as uncoupling protein 1, or UCP1) is a mitochondrial carrier protein found in brown adipose tissue (BAT). It is used to generate heat by non-shivering thermogenesis, and makes a quantitatively important contribution to countering heat loss in babies which would otherwise occur due to their high surface area-volume ratio.

== Structure ==
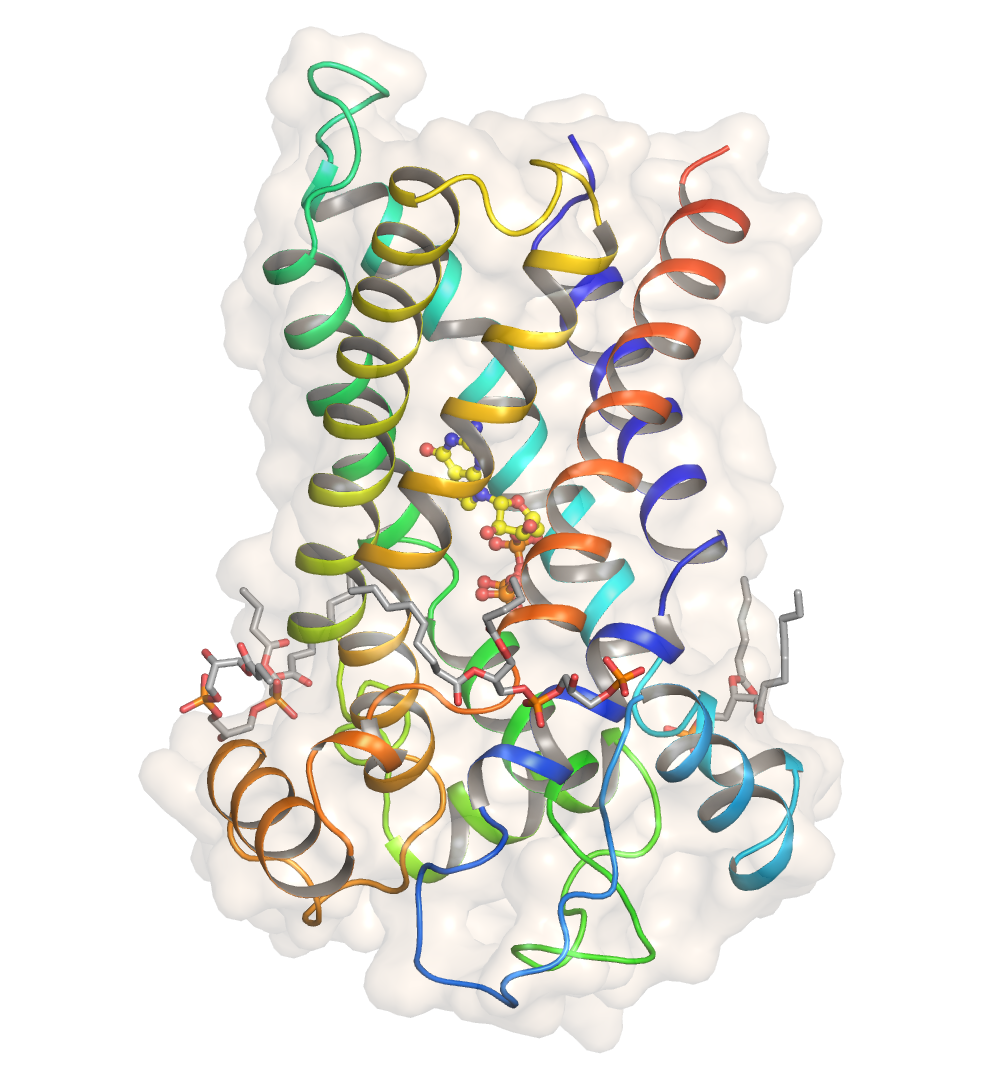
Structure of the human uncoupling protein

The atomic structure of human uncoupling protein 1 UCP1 has been solved by cryogenic-electron microscopy. The structure has the typical fold of a member of the SLC25 family. UCP1 is locked in a cytoplasmic-open state by guanosine triphosphate in a pH-dependent manner, preventing proton leak.

== Mechanism ==
Mechanism of thermogenin activation: In a last step thermogenin inhibition is released through the presence of free fatty acids. The cascade is initiated by binding of norepinephrine to the cells β_{3}-adrenoceptors.

UCP1 belongs to the UCP family which are transmembrane proteins that decrease the proton gradient generated in oxidative phosphorylation. They do this by increasing the permeability of the inner mitochondrial membrane, allowing protons that have been pumped into the intermembrane space to return to the mitochondrial matrix and hence dissipating the proton gradient. UCP1-mediated heat generation in brown fat uncouples the respiratory chain, allowing for fast substrate oxidation with a low rate of ATP production. UCP1 is related to other mitochondrial metabolite transporters such as the adenine nucleotide translocator, a proton channel in the mitochondrial inner membrane that permits the translocation of protons from the mitochondrial intermembrane space to the mitochondrial matrix. UCP1 is restricted to brown adipose tissue, where it provides a mechanism for the enormous heat-generating capacity of the tissue.

UCP1 is activated in the brown fat cell by fatty acids and inhibited by nucleotides. Fatty acids are released by the following signaling cascade: Sympathetic nervous system terminals release Norepinephrine onto a Beta-3 adrenergic receptor on the plasma membrane. This activates adenylyl cyclase, which catalyses the conversion of ATP to cyclic AMP (cAMP). cAMP activates protein kinase A, causing its active C subunits to be freed from its regulatory R subunits. Active protein kinase A, in turn, phosphorylates triacylglycerol lipase, thereby activating it. The lipase converts triacylglycerols into free fatty acids, which activate UCP1, overriding the inhibition caused by purine nucleotides (GDP and ADP). During the termination of thermogenesis, thermogenin is inactivated and residual fatty acids are disposed of through oxidation, allowing the cell to resume its normal energy-conserving state.

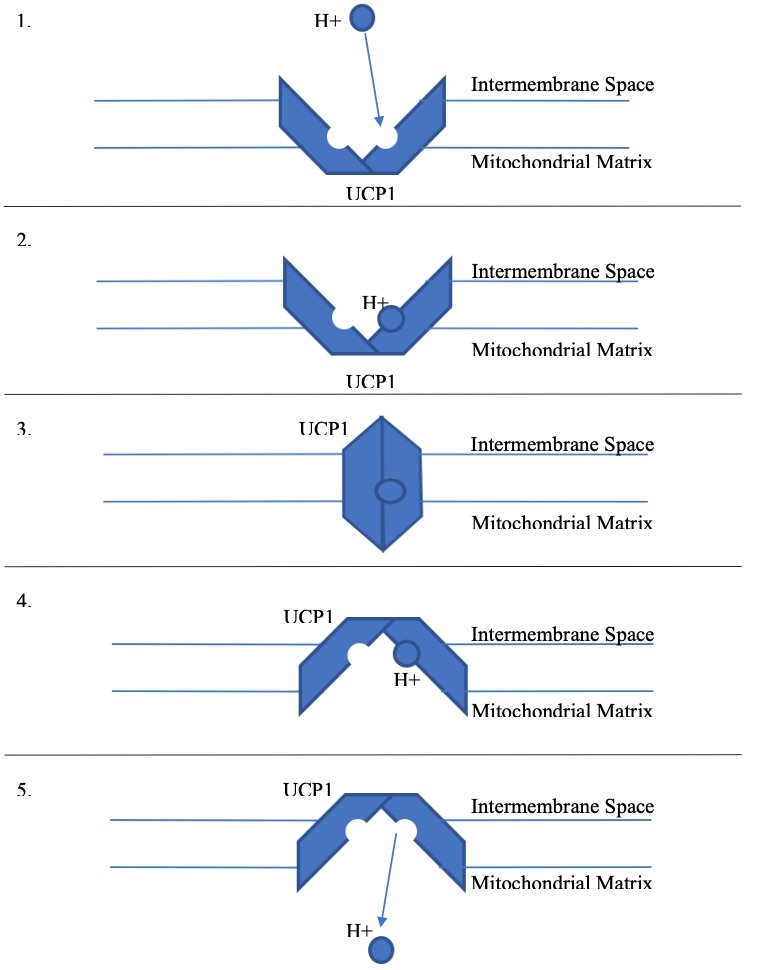
The Alternating Access Model for UCP1 with H+ as a Substrate

UCP1 is very similar to the ATP/ADP Carrier protein, or Adenine Nucleotide Translocator (ANT). The proposed alternating access model for UCP1 is based on the similar ANT mechanism. The substrate comes in to the half open UCP1 protein from the cytoplasmic side of the membrane, the protein closes the cytoplasmic side so the substrate is enclosed in the protein, and then the matrix side of the protein opens, allowing the substrate to be released into the mitochondrial matrix. The opening and closing of the protein is accomplished by the tightening and loosening of salt bridges at the membrane surface of the protein. Substantiation for this modelling of UCP1 on ANT is found in the many conserved residues between the two proteins that are actively involved in the transportation of substrate across the membrane. Both proteins are integral membrane proteins, localized to the inner mitochondrial membrane, and they have a similar pattern of salt bridges, proline residues, and hydrophobic or aromatic amino acids that can close or open when in the cytoplasmic or matrix state.

== HEAT cycle ==
The HEAT Cycle is a proposed metabolic pseudo-futile cycle that occurs in the mitochondria of brown adipose tissue (BAT) and is essential for non-shivering thermogenesis. In a recent study on differential temperature-based analysis of cytoplasmic mitochondria (CM) and lipid droplet-anchored mitochondria (LDAM), it was observed that LDAM generate heat through uncoupling proteins, while CM not only produce heat but also enhance the overall cellular metabolism of brown fat cells (BFCs). At lower temperatures or during cold acclimation, brown fat cells (BFCs) initiate thermogenesis at the indirect cost of ATP. Free fatty acids (FFAs) are moved from the cytoplasm to the mitochondria where they undergo β-oxidation, producing one NADH and one FADH per cycle. Instead of entering the TCA cycle, acetyl-CoA from β-oxidation combines with oxaloacetate to form citrate. This citrate returns to the cytoplasm, where it is converted back into oxaloacetate and acetyl-CoA. The cytosolic acetyl-CoA is then used for fatty acid synthesis, fueled by NADPH. The newly synthesized FFAs can be transported back to the mitochondria, creating a cyclical process known as the HEAT cycle, which illustrates the interplay of fatty acid synthesis and breakdown. The glycerol-3-phosphate (G3P) shuttle has been shown to be active at lower temperatures; it transfers cytoplasmic NADH to the mitochondria in the form of FADH. The HEAT cycle provides a comprehensive overview of the bioenergetics of brown fat cells (BFCs), highlighting the intricate interconnections within metabolic processes. Proteomic analysis of two mitochondrial subpopulations (cytoplasmic mitochondria; CM, lipid droplet-anchored mitochondria; LDAM) of BATs revealed that (BFCs) exhibit heightened expression of key proteins involved in several metabolic pathways, including glycolysis, gluconeogenesis, glyceroneogenesis, the pentose phosphate pathway related to nucleotide metabolism, fatty acid β-oxidation, fatty acid synthesis, and the tricarboxylic acid (TCA) cycle, as well as the electron transport chain. Pyruvate, the end product of glycolysis, is transported into the mitochondria where it is converted to acetyl-CoA, linking glycolytic and mitochondrial metabolism. This acetyl-CoA—derived from either glycolytic or β-oxidative sources—then condenses with oxaloacetate to form citrate. Notably, the citrate is shuttled back to the cytoplasm, where it plays a crucial role in fatty acid synthesis. In summary, the HEAT cycle serves as a cyto-mitochondrial pathway that integrates the breakdown and synthesis of fatty acids, ultimately facilitating themogenesis.

The NADH donates its protons to complex I (C-I) of the electron transport chain (ETC). The protons from NADH then move to ubiquinone, then to complex III (C-III), and finally to complex IV (C-IV), resulting in the production of water and ATP. ATP is synthesized by ATP synthase at each step of proton movement. Meanwhile, FADH donates its protons directly to C-III through ubiquinone in the ETC, also contributing to ATP and water production. It is known that in isolated mitochondrial samples of the ETC, 2.5 ATP molecules are produced from NADH and 1.5 ATP molecules from FADH. Uncoupling protein (UCP1) disrupts the electron transport chain (ETC) by uncoupling protons, diverting them towards heat production instead of ATP synthesis.

== Evolution ==
UCP1 is expressed in brown adipose tissue, which is functionally found only in eutherians. The UCP1, or thermogenin, gene likely arose in an ancestor of modern vertebrates, but did not initially allow for our vertebrate ancestor to use non-shivering thermogenesis for warmth. It wasn't until heat generation was adaptively selected for in placental mammal descendants of this common ancestor that UCP1 evolved its current function in brown adipose tissue to provide additional warmth. While UCP1 plays a key thermogenic role in a wide range of placental mammals, particularly those with small body size and those that hibernate, the UCP1 gene has lost functionality in several large-bodied lineages (e.g. horses, elephants, sea cows, whales and hyraxes) and lineages with low metabolic rates (e.g. pangolins, armadillos, sloths and anteaters). Recent discoveries of non-heat-generating orthologues of UCP1 in fish and marsupials, other descendants of the ancestor of modern vertebrates, show that this gene was passed on to all modern vertebrates, but aside from placental mammals, none have heat producing capability. This further suggests that UCP1 had a different original purpose and in fact phylogenetic and sequence analyses indicate that UCP1 is likely a mutated form of a dicarboxylate carrier protein that adapted for thermogenesis in placental mammals.

== History ==
Researchers in the 1960s investigating brown adipose tissue, found that in addition to producing more heat than typical of other tissues, brown adipose tissue seemed to short circuit, or uncouple, respiration coupling. Uncoupling protein 1 was discovered in 1976 by David G. Nicholls, Vibeke Bernson, and Gillian Heaton, and the discovery was published in 1978 and shown to be the protein responsible for this uncoupling effect. UCP1 was later purified for the first time in 1980 and was first cloned in 1988.

Uncoupling protein two (UCP2), a homolog of UCP1, was identified in 1997. UCP2 localizes to a wide variety of tissues, and is thought to be involved in regulating reactive oxygen species (ROS). In the past decade, three additional homologs of UCP1 have been identified, including UCP3, UCP4, and UCP5 (also known as BMCP1 or SLC25A14).

== Clinical relevance ==
Methods of delivering UCP1 to cells by gene transfer therapy or methods of its upregulation have been an important line of enquiry in research into the treatment of obesity, due to their ability to dissipate excess metabolic stores.

== See also ==
- 2,4-Dinitrophenol (A synthetic small-molecule proton shuttle with similar effects)
