= UCP3 =

Protein-coding gene in the species Homo sapiens

Identifiers
- Aliases: UCP3, uncoupling protein 3 (mitochondrial, proton carrier), SLC25A9, uncoupling protein 3
- External IDs: OMIM: 602044; MGI: 1099787; GeneCards: UCP3

Gene location (Human)
| Chr. | Chromosome 11 (human) |
| Band | 11q13.4 | Start | 74,000,277 bp |
| Band | 11q13.4 | End | 74,009,085 bp |

Gene location (Mouse)
| Chr. | Chromosome 7 (mouse) |
| Band | 7 E2|7 54.36 cM | Start | 100,122,197 bp |
| Band | 7 E2|7 54.36 cM | End | 100,135,639 bp |
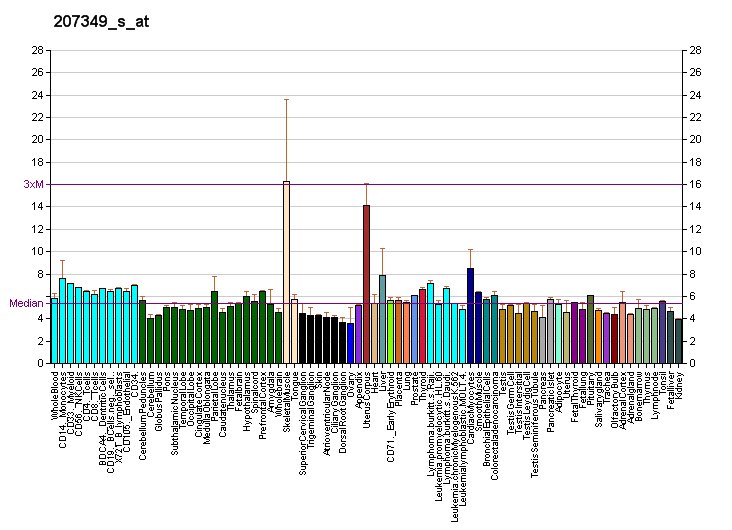

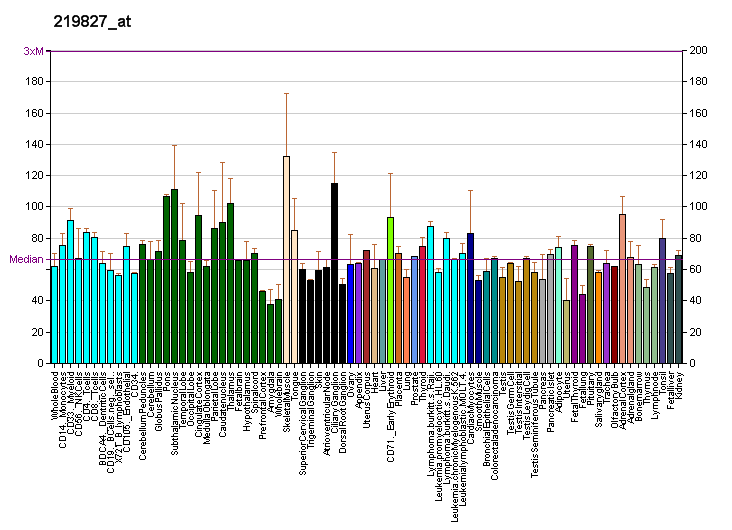
RNA expression pattern
| Bgee | Human / Mouse (ortholog); Top expressed in: gastrocnemius muscle; muscle of thigh; triceps brachii muscle; thoracic diaphragm; glutes; skeletal muscle tissue; Skeletal muscle tissue of rectus abdominis; quadriceps femoris muscle; vastus lateralis muscle; biceps brachii / Top expressed in: muscle of thigh; sternocleidomastoid muscle; triceps brachii muscle; tibialis anterior muscle; medial head of gastrocnemius muscle; quadriceps femoris muscle; plantaris muscle; temporal muscle; knee joint; digastric muscle; More reference expression data |
| BioGPS | More reference expression data |
Gene ontology
| Molecular function | transporter activity; protein binding; oxidative phosphorylation uncoupler activity; transmembrane transporter activity |
| Cellular component | membrane; mitochondrial membranes; mitochondrion; mitochondrial inner membrane; integral component of membrane |
| Biological process | response to hypoxia; response to superoxide; response to nutrient; lipid metabolism; response to steroid hormone; ageing; response to glucocorticoid; response to activity; respiratory gaseous exchange by respiratory system; fatty acid metabolic process; response to insulin; cellular response to hormone stimulus; response to cold; mitochondrial transmembrane transport; adaptive thermogenesis; mitochondrial transport; proton transmembrane transport |
Sources:Amigo / QuickGO
Orthologs
| Databases | NCBI: entry; OMA: entry |
| Species | Human | Mouse |
| Entrez | 7352 | 22229 |
| Ensembl | ENSG00000175564 | ENSMUSG00000032942 |
| UniProt | P55916 | P56501 |
| RefSeq (mRNA) | NM_022803; NM_003356 | NM_009464 |
| RefSeq (protein) | NP_003347; NP_073714 | NP_033490 |
| Location (UCSC) | Chr 11: 74 – 74.01 Mb | Chr 7: 100.12 – 100.14 Mb |
| PubMed search |
- Wikidata
| View/Edit Human | View/Edit Mouse |

Mitochondrial uncoupling protein 3 is a protein that in humans is encoded by the UCP3 gene. The gene is located in chromosome (11q13.4) with an exon count of 7 and is expressed on the inner mitochondrial membrane. Uncoupling proteins transfer anions from the inner mitochondrial membrane to the outer mitochondrial membrane, thereby separating (or uncoupling) oxidative phosphorylation from synthesis of ATP, and dissipating energy stored in the mitochondrial membrane potential as heat. Uncoupling proteins also reduce generation of reactive oxygen species.

== Gene ==
This gene has tissue-specific transcription initiation with other transcription initiation sites upstream of SM-1 (major skeletal muscle site). Chromosomal order is 5'-UCP3-UCP2-3'. Two splice variants have been found for this gene.

UCP3 were confirmed containing four single nucleotide polymorphism rs1800849, rs11235972, rs1726745 and rs3781907. There was high impact score of rs11235972 GG genotype thus showing association of UCP3 gene polymorphism and nonalcoholic fatty liver disease in Chinese children. The research of counterfeits in two independent population there was a similarity between the -55CT mutation of UCP3 and lower BMI. This affiliation was being modulated by the energy intake, hence deriving the undefined effect of diet and partly association of inconsistencies of prior related studies.

== Tissue distribution ==
Uncoupling proteins are transporters in mitochondrial membrane which deplete the proton gradient. UCP1 is highly expressed in brown adipocytes, UCP2 is variably expressed in many different tissues, and UCP3 is expressed primarily in skeletal muscle. At amino acid level human UCP3 is 71% equivalent to UCP2.

== Structure ==
UCPs contain the three homologous protein domains of MACPs.

== Function ==
Mitochondrial uncoupling protein 3 (UCP3) is a members of the larger family of mitochondrial anion carrier proteins (MACP). UCPs facilitate the transfer of anions from the inner to the outer mitochondrial membrane and transfer of protons from the outer to the inner mitochondrial membrane, reducing the mitochondrial membrane potential in mammalian cells. The exact mechanisms of how UCPs transfer H+/OH− are not known. In addition to UCP1, UCP3 is an important mediator of thermogenesis.

== Disease association ==
Mutations in the UCP3 gene are associated with obesity. UCP3 plays an essential role in obesity. A mutation in exon 3 (V102I) was diagnosed in an obese and diabetic. A mutation initializing a stop codon at exon 4 (R143X) and a mutation in the splice donor junction of exon 6 was analyzed in a compound heterozygote which was unnaturally obese and diabetic. Allele frequency of exon 3 and exon 6 splice at an alliance mutation were analyzed to be similar in African American and mende tribe and was absent in Caucasians. Exon 6–splice donor being heterozygotes, fat oxidation rates was reduced by 50%, initiating a role for UCP3 in metabolic fuel partitioning. UCP3 (uncoupling protein) deliberates the hypoxia resistance to the renal epithelial cells and its upregulation in renal cell carcinoma. The energy consumption of modulated and the association of -55CT polymorphism of UCP3 with the body weight and in type 2 diabetic patients.

== Inhibitors ==
Since protein UCP3 is affecting the long chain fatty acid metabolism and preventing cytosolic triglyceride storage. Telmisartan being an inhibitor by proven studies on rat skeletal muscle and improving the mutant protein activity and also its involvement in the dominant negative UCP3 mutants. Hence, novel UCP3 gene variants which associated to childhood obesity and even the effect of fatty acid oxidation prevention in triglyceride storage.

== Interactions ==
UCP3 has been shown to interact with YWHAQ.

== See also ==
- Uncoupling protein
