= Brain mitochondrial carrier protein 1 =

Protein-coding gene in the species Homo sapiens

SLC25A14

Identifiers
- Aliases: SLC25A14, solute carrier family 25 (mitochondrial carrier, brain), member 14, BMCP1, UCP5, solute carrier family 25 member 14
- External IDs: OMIM: 300242; MGI: 1330823; GeneCards: SLC25A14

Gene location (Human)
Chr.	X chromosome (human)
Band	Xq26.1	Start	130,339,888 bp
Band	Xq26.1	End	130,373,361 bp

Gene location (Mouse)
Chr.	X chromosome (mouse)
Band	X A5|X 25.69 cM	Start	47,712,290 bp
Band	X A5|X 25.69 cM	End	47,751,171 bp
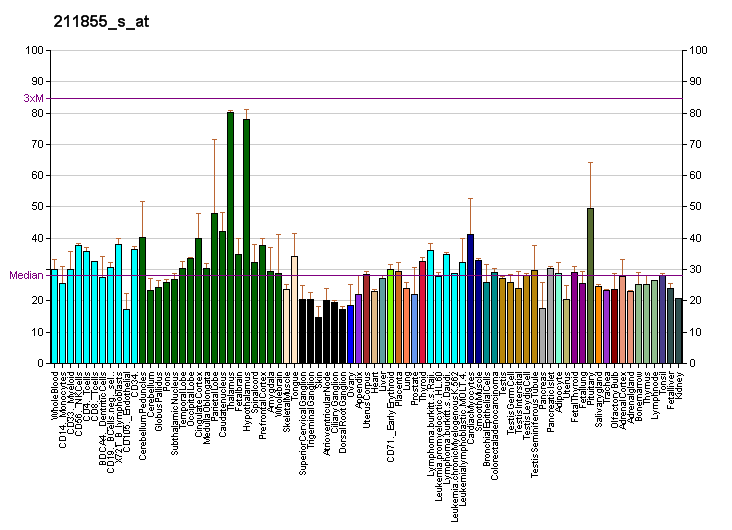

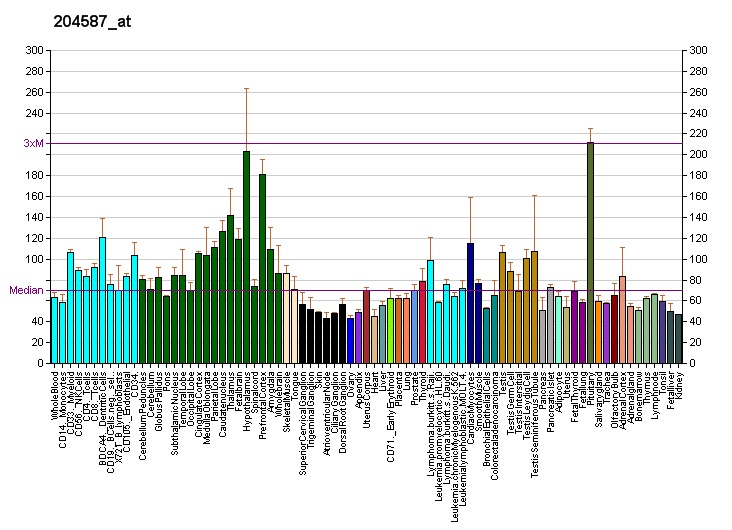
RNA expression pattern
Bgee	Human / Mouse (ortholog); Top expressed in: secondary oocyte; middle temporal gyrus; endothelial cell; Brodmann area 23; sperm; right uterine tube; pituitary gland; anterior pituitary; epithelium of nasopharynx; Brodmann area 9 / Top expressed in: substantia nigra; supraoptic nucleus; olfactory tubercle; dorsal striatum; paraventricular nucleus of hypothalamus; facial motor nucleus; lateral septal nucleus; suprachiasmatic nucleus; arcuate nucleus; ventromedial nucleus; More reference expression data
BioGPS	More reference expression data
Gene ontology
Molecular function	transmembrane transporter activity; sulfate transmembrane transporter activity; thiosulfate transmembrane transporter activity; oxaloacetate transmembrane transporter activity; malate transmembrane transporter activity; succinate transmembrane transporter activity; antiporter activity
Cellular component	membrane; mitochondrial envelope; integral component of membrane; mitochondrion; mitochondrial membranes; integral component of plasma membrane; mitochondrial inner membrane
Biological process	aerobic dissimilation; mitochondrial transport; transmembrane transport; proton transmembrane transport; sulfate transport; thiosulfate transport; oxaloacetate transport; phosphate ion transmembrane transport; succinate transmembrane transport; malate transmembrane transport; oxaloacetate(2-) transmembrane transport; sulfate transmembrane transport
Sources:Amigo / QuickGO
Orthologs
Databases	NCBI: entry; OMA: entry
Species	Human	Mouse
Entrez	9016	20523
Ensembl	ENSG00000102078	ENSMUSG00000031105
UniProt	O95258	Q9Z2B2
RefSeq (mRNA)	NM_001282195; NM_001282196; NM_001282197; NM_001282198; NM_003951 NM_022810	NM_001166450; NM_001290703; NM_001290704; NM_001290705; NM_011398 NM_001359136
RefSeq (protein)	NP_001269124; NP_001269125; NP_001269126; NP_001269127	NP_001159922; NP_001277632; NP_001277633; NP_001277634; NP_035528 NP_001346065; NP_001390179; NP_001390180; NP_001390181; NP_001390183; NP_001390185; NP_001390187; NP_001390188; NP_001390189; NP_001390190; NP_001390191; NP_001390192; NP_001390193; NP_001390194
Location (UCSC)	Chr X: 130.34 – 130.37 Mb	Chr X: 47.71 – 47.75 Mb
PubMed search
- Wikidata
View/Edit Human	View/Edit Mouse

Brain mitochondrial carrier protein 1 is a protein that in humans is encoded by the SLC25A14 gene.

Mitochondrial uncoupling proteins (UCP) are members of the larger family of mitochondrial anion carrier proteins (MACP). UCPs separate oxidative phosphorylation from ATP synthesis with energy dissipated as heat, also referred to as the mitochondrial proton leak. UCPs facilitate the transfer of anions from the inner to the outer mitochondrial membrane and the return transfer of protons from the outer to the inner mitochondrial membrane. They also reduce the mitochondrial membrane potential in mammalian cells. Tissue specificity occurs for the different UCPs and the exact methods of how UCPs transfer H+/OH- are not known. UCPs contain the three homologous protein domains of MACPs. This gene is widely expressed in many tissues with the greatest abundance in brain and testis. The gene product has an N-terminal hydrophobic domain that is not present in other UCPs. Two splice variants have been found for this gene.

Mitochondrial uncoupling proteins play a significant role in the human genome as well as in the genomes of plants, prokaryotes, fungi, and other eukaryotes, including all mammals. Humans contain five different isoforms of the uncoupling proteins, and each UCP has its own function in the human body; however, they are all vital in the genome. Past studies demonstrated how decreasing redox signaling and specific UCPs have a neuroprotective role that can protect against a number of neurodegenerative diseases, including hypoxia, ischemia, and illnesses such as Alzheimer's disease, Parkinson's disease, and schizophrenia.

== Mitochondrial uncoupling proteins ==
=== UCP1 ===
The discovery of UCP1 was found in some members of Rodentia but mainly in brown adipose tissue found in infants and plays a role in energy homeostasis. The location of UCP1 is in the inner mitochondrial membrane. The body's brown adipose tissue prevents hypothermia by releasing the proton motive force from oxidative phosphorylation. UCP1 thus controls both the independent and thermogenic metabolisms. Diseases associated with UCP1 include type 2 diabetes and cardiometabolic disease.

=== UCP2 ===
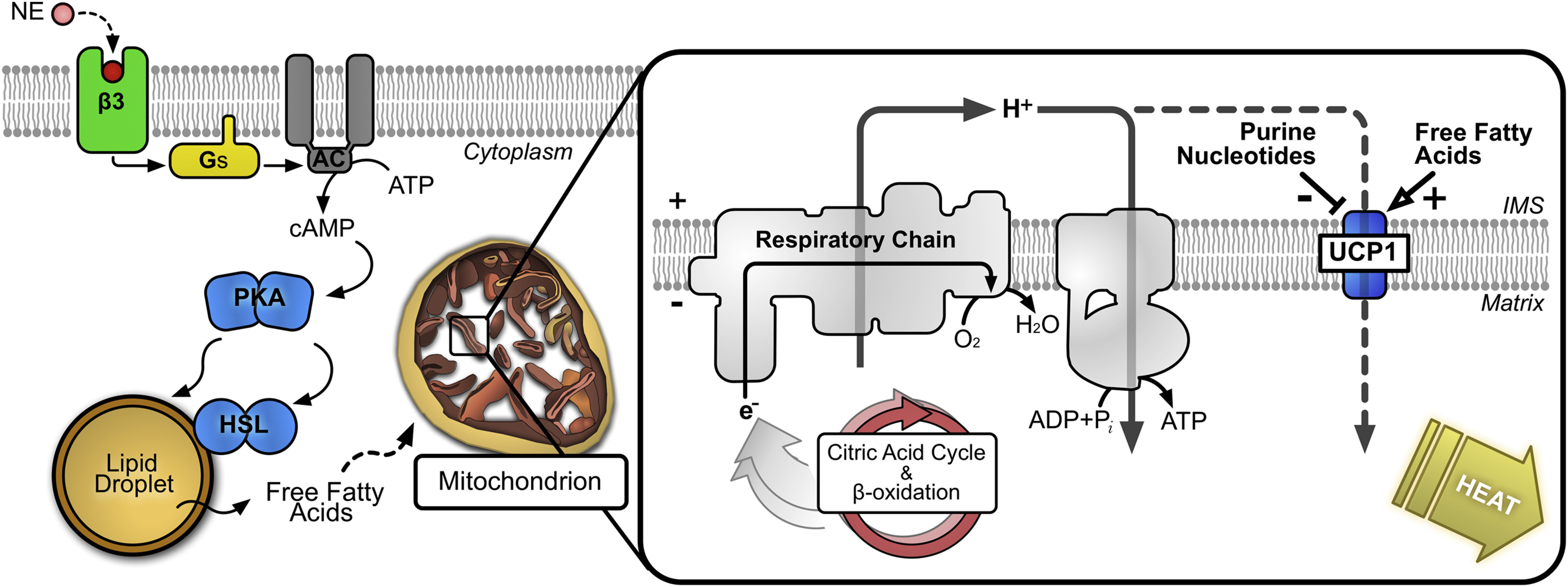
UCP1 in the cell

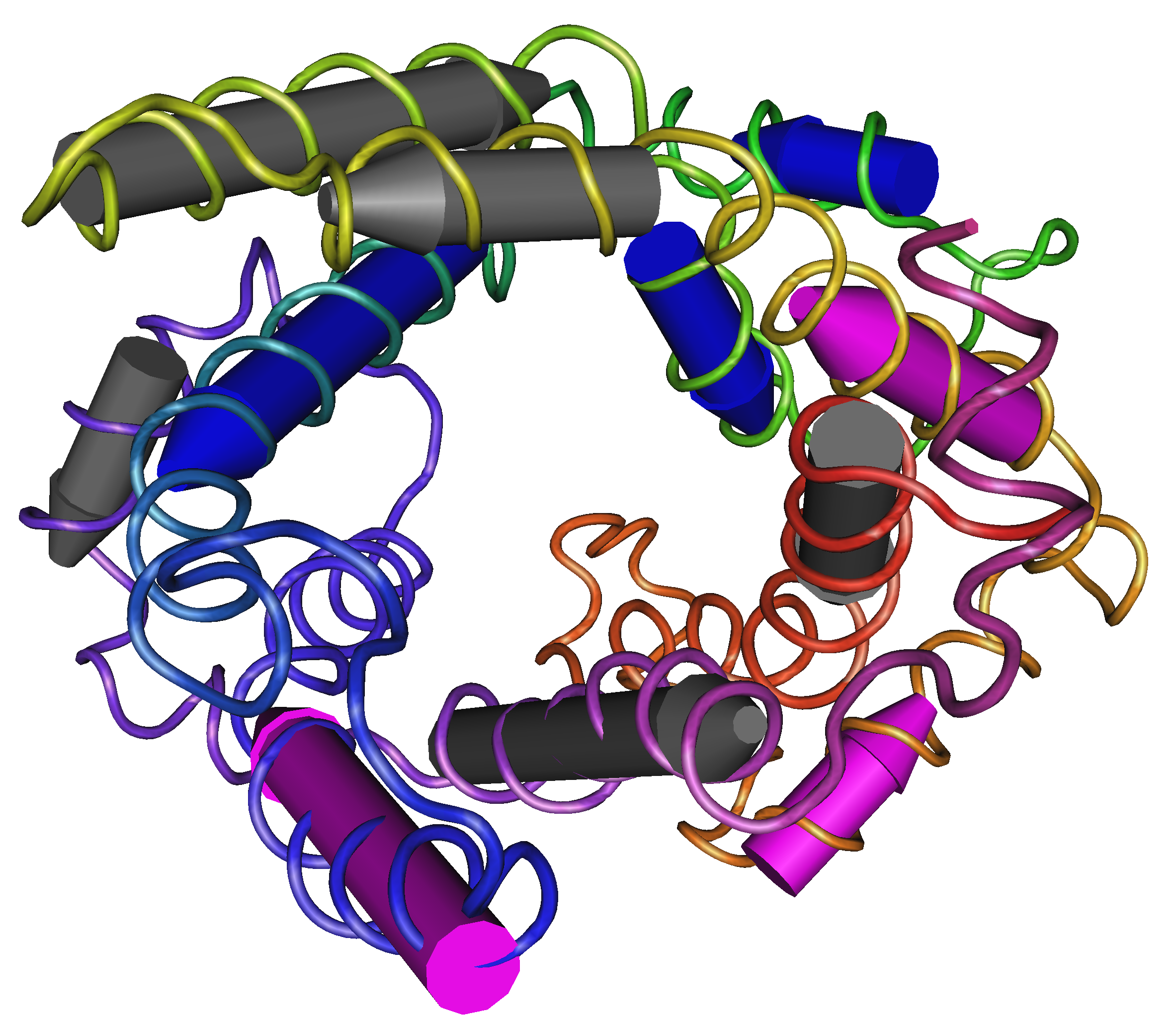
UCP2

UCP2 has different functions throughout the body, such as in the brain, lung, kidney, spleen, heart, and skeletal muscle. Additionally, several areas of the central nervous system have consistently high levels of UCP2 mRNA expression. Immediate neurons, invading or dormant monocytes, cells from the choroidal plexus, and endothelial cells are linked to increased UCP2 mRNA levels. Mitochondrial-associated diseases are neuroprotective in several neurodegenerative diseases, including T2D-induced neuronal death, SCZ obesity, inflammatory disease, cancer, and cerebral ischemia (Kumar, 2022). Because of mitochondrial malfunction and modifications to synaptic plasticity, multiple diseases are linked to UCP2. In the damaged area of the brain after a brain injury, UP2 expression rises. In the brain, UCP2's ultimate role is in neuronal plasticity and neuronal survival. Specifically, in cerebral ischemia, studies suggest UCP2 regulates ROS production, neuroinflammation, mitochondrial potential, energy balance, neuroendocrine function, and cell death. Another important function of UCP2 is controlling the temperature of the microenvironment at the presynaptic terminal. According to studies, UCP2 is crucial for neurons' bioenergetic adaptation to increasing neuronal activity and synaptic plasticity. As a result, data from various studies suggests that UCP2 is a plausible therapeutic target for treating neurological conditions.

=== UCP3 ===
UCP3 is mainly expressed in adipose tissue, the lungs, and skeletal muscles; however, it is also found in the brain, kidney, spleen, and heart. The functions of this UCP are to regulate resting metabolic rate, regulate fatty acid metabolism, prevent diabetic neuropathy by preventing nerve loss, limit free radical levels in cells, and limit the level of ROS. UCP3 also reduces the risk of type 1 diabetes, indicating UCPs prevent mitochondrial-mediated neuronal injury (Kumar, 2022). The capacity to control elements affected by energy balance, such as 3-adrenoreceptor agonists, food intake, and exposure to cold, is shared by UCPs 1, 2, and 3. Lastly, cardiovascular disease is associated with UCP3.

=== UCPs 4 and 5 ===
The central nervous system is the primary site of expression for UCPs 4 and 5, and each UCP has a distinct function.

UCP4 maintains homeostasis by boosting mitochondrial complex II activity in SH-SY5Y neuroblastoma cells, enhancing fatty acid oxidation and insulin sensitivity, and decreasing mitochondrial membrane potential in astrocytes, thereby supporting neuronal survival. UCP4 is associated with neurodegenerative diseases such as Alzehmier's, Parkinson's, and schiperpheria, T2D, and induced neuronal death (Kumar, 2022). UCP4 is located in brain regions such as the hippocampus, substantial nigra, and striatum.

UCP5 controls homeostasis by increasing ATP synthesis, mitochondrial polarization, and the prevention of apoptosis. It also maintains the potential of the mitochondrial membrane and lessens oxidative stress against 1-methyl-4-phenylpyridinium MPP+ and dopamine toxicity in SH-SY5Y cells. The expression of UCP5 is in neurons and astrocyte cells, and it is BMCP1, a mitochondrial brain carrier protein. UCP5 is associated with aging and the same neurodegenerative diseases as UCP4.

== Structure ==
As aforementioned, the functions and distributions of the five isoforms of UCPs vary; some are located on the same chromosome in humans, rats, and mice. UCP1 is located on chromosomes 4, 19, and 8. UCP2 is found on chromosomes 11, 1, and 7. Further, UCP2 shares similarities with UCP 1, 3, 4, and 5.

== Neurodegenerative diseases ==
Worldwide, neurodegenerative disorders pose a serious threat to public health. Along with oxidative stress, neuroinflammation, and an imbalance in energy homeostasis, mitochondrial dysfunction is a key contributor. One of the most primitive and crucial events in the pathogenesis of Alzheimer's is oxidative stress. Reactive oxygen species and inducible nitric oxide synthase are produced primarily in mitochondria, which in Alzheimer's disease causes the generation of reactive oxygen species and ultimately results in neuronal death (Kumar 2022). Glia maturation factors found in glial cells are linked with the down-regulation of UCPs 2 and 4. A pro-inflammatory protein known as Glia maturation factor has been found close to amyloid plaques and neurofibrillary tangles in Alzheimer's. It is linked to the expression of inducible nitric oxide synthase and NF-kB.

Various regions of the brain in Alzheimer's disease exhibit up-regulated GMF expression. Neuroinflammation was shown to be a contributing factor in neurodegenerative illnesses, and UCP2 was identified as the primary regulator of M1 and M2 plasticity toward the protective phenotype in brain disorders. The increased production of reactive oxygen species in UCP 2 and 4 results in the development of Alzheimer's because of the increased chance of apoptosis.

Parkinson's disease typically affects adults over the age of 60; however, research indicates that brain injury in people between the ages of 18 and 30 can cause this condition. Over 90% of Parkinson's cases are isolated, though less than 10% are genetic. Symptoms of Parkinson's consist of tremors, slow movement, balance impairment, and other disorders accompanied by Parkinson's. This symptom occurs because of the loss of dopaminergic neurons during the elimination of dopamine neurotransmitters. Because UCP4 is a potential regulator of calcium homeostasis, blocking calcium channels that lower oxidative stress and stop the death of neuronal cells prevents calcium excretion in mitochondria. The leakage of protons and oxygen consumption increase due to increased UCP5 production, resulting in decreased mitochondrial potential and ATP synthesis.

Ageing, hypoxia (injured brain), and type 2 diabetes correspond with UCP 2 and 4. The aging brain is a risk factor for neurodegenerative diseases, and the overexpression of UCP2 can halt the aging process and stop the loss of neurons. Hypoxia occurs when there's a decrease in oxygen in tissues, which causes cognitive impairment. UCP4 levels rise in response to environmental exposure in humans, shielding the brain from damage. Apoptosis contributes to cerebral ischemia and is necessary for calcium homeostasis, free radical release, the formation of reactive oxygen species (ROS), and energy metabolism. As further research is still being conducted, studies show UCP1 and UCP2 are associated with type 2 diabetes.

== See also ==
- Solute carrier family
- Uncoupling protein
