= Stenotherm =

Organism requiring a specific ambient temperature

A stenotherm (from Greek στενός stenos "narrow" and θέρμη therme "heat") is a species or living organism capable of surviving only within a narrow temperature range. This specialization is often found in organisms that inhabit environments with relatively stable environments, such as deep sea environments or polar regions.

The opposite of a stenotherm is a eurytherm, an organism that can function across a wide range of body temperatures. Eurythermic organisms are typically found in environments with significant temperature variations, such as temperate or tropical regions.

The size, shape, and composition of an organism's body can influence its temperature regulation, with larger organisms generally maintaining a more stable internal temperature than smaller ones.

== Examples ==
Chionoecetes opilio is a stenothermic organism, and temperature significantly affects its biology throughout its life history, from embryo to adult. Small changes in temperature (< 2 °C) can increase the duration of egg incubation for C. opilio by a full year.

== See also ==
- Ecotope
