= FNDC5 =

Protein-coding gene in humans

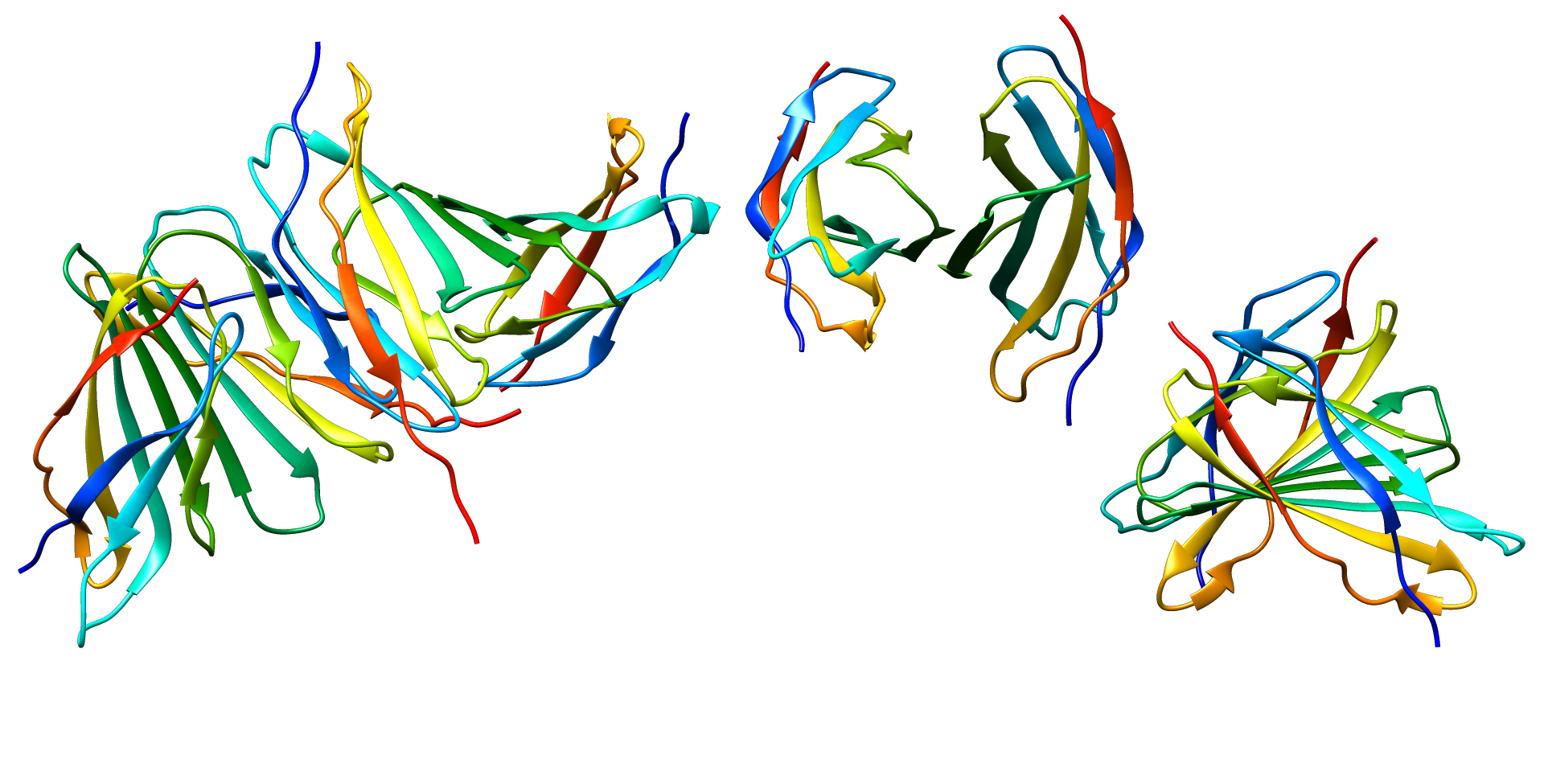

Identifiers
- Aliases: FNDC5, FRCP2, irisin, Irisin, fibronectin type III domain containing 5
- External IDs: OMIM: 611906; MGI: 1917614; GeneCards: FNDC5
Available structures
PDB	Ortholog search: PDBe RCSB
PDB	List of PDB id codes 4LSD

Gene location (Human)
Chr.	Chromosome 1 (human)
Band	1p35.1	Start	32,862,268 bp
Band	1p35.1	End	32,872,482 bp

Gene location (Mouse)
Chr.	Chromosome 4 (mouse)
Band	4|4 D2.2	Start	129,030,792 bp
Band	4|4 D2.2	End	129,038,386 bp
RNA expression pattern
Bgee	Human / Mouse (ortholog); Top expressed in: Skeletal muscle tissue of biceps brachii; muscle of thigh; Skeletal muscle tissue of rectus abdominis; vastus lateralis muscle; right hemisphere of cerebellum; gastrocnemius muscle; apex of heart; deltoid muscle; cardiac muscle tissue of right atrium; tibialis anterior muscle / Top expressed in: interventricular septum; myocardium of ventricle; cerebellar cortex; soleus muscle; extraocular muscle; medial vestibular nucleus; deep cerebellar nuclei; superior frontal gyrus; digastric muscle; primary visual cortex; More reference expression data
BioGPS	n/a
Gene ontology
Molecular function	hormone activity; molecular function
Cellular component	integral component of membrane; extracellular region; peroxisomal membrane; peroxisome; membrane; endoplasmic reticulum; plasma membrane
Biological process	response to muscle activity; positive regulation of brown fat cell differentiation; regulation of signaling receptor activity; biological process; signal transduction
Sources:Amigo / QuickGO
Orthologs
Databases	NCBI: entry; OMA: entry
Species	Human	Mouse
Entrez	252995	384061
Ensembl	ENSG00000160097	ENSMUSG00000001334
UniProt	Q8NAU1	Q8K4Z2
RefSeq (mRNA)	NM_153756; NM_001171940; NM_001171941	NM_027402
RefSeq (protein)	NP_001165411; NP_001165412; NP_715637	NP_081678
Location (UCSC)	Chr 1: 32.86 – 32.87 Mb	Chr 4: 129.03 – 129.04 Mb
PubMed search
- Wikidata
View/Edit Human	View/Edit Mouse

Fibronectin type III domain-containing protein 5, the precursor of irisin, is a type I transmembrane glycoprotein that is encoded by the FNDC5 gene. Irisin is a cleaved version of FNDC5, named after the Greek messenger goddess Iris.

Fibronectin domain-containing protein 5 is a membrane protein comprising a short cytoplasmic domain, a transmembrane segment, and an ectodomain consisting of a ~100 kDa fibronectin type III (FNIII) domain.

== History ==
FNDC5 was first discovered in 2002 during a genome search for fibronectin type III domains and independently, in a search for peroxisomal proteins.

The ectodomain was proposed to be cleaved to give a soluble peptide hormone named irisin. Separately it was proposed that irisin is secreted from muscle in response to exercise, and may mediate some beneficial effects of exercise in humans and the potential for generating weight loss and blocking diabetes has been suggested. Others questioned these findings. A 2021 review highlights new discoveries of irisin in brain function and bone remodeling, but criticizes all studies using commercial antibody assays to measure irisin concentrations. It also raises a question of how an exercise hormone could arise in evolution. Shortly afterwards, a study using FNDC5 knock-out mice as well as artificial elevation of circulating irisin levels showed that irisin confers beneficial cognitive effects of physical exercise and that it can serve an exercise mimetic in mice. This regulatory system is therefore investigated for potential interventions to improve cognitive function or alleviate Alzheimer's disease.

== Biosynthesis and secretion ==
The FNDC5 gene encodes a prohormone, a single-pass type I membrane protein (human, 212 amino acids; mouse and rat, 209 amino acids) that is upregulated by muscular exercise and undergoes post-translational processing to generate irisin. The sequence of the protein includes a signal peptide, a single fibronectin type III domain, and a C-terminal hydrophobic domain that is anchored in the cell membrane.

The production of irisin is similar to the shedding and release of other hormones and hormone-like polypeptides, such as epidermal growth factor and TGF alpha, from transmembrane precursors. After the N-terminal signal peptide is removed, the peptide is proteolytically cleaved from the C-terminal moiety, glycosylated and released as a hormone of 112 amino acids (in human, amino acids 32–143 of the full-length protein; in mouse and rat, amino acids 29–140) that comprises most of the FNIII repeat region. The protease/enzyme responsible for the cleavage of FNDC5 to its secreted form, irisin, has not been identified.

The sequence of irisin is highly conserved in mammals; the human and murine sequences are identical. However, the start codon of human FNDC5 is mutated to ATA. This causes human FNDC5 to be potentially expressed in two versions:

- The full-length version with an ATA start, which is transcribed at only 1% the level of other animals with the normal ATG start.
- A severely truncated version beginning at methionine-76 (Met-76). This version has no predicted signal peptide required for transport out of cytoplasm.

A mass spectrometry study reported irisin levels ~3 ng/ml in human plasma, a level on par with other key human hormones, such as insulin. The same study reports that the main form in plasma is the ATA form, as expected for signal peptide presence. There is no comparable study of irisin levels in other animals.

In a more recent study, Witmer et al. provide complementary genomic and molecular evidence to demonstrate that Fndc5 (irisin myokine precursor protein) is translated in humans and mice from an overlooked upstream ATG start codon. These findings lend further support to the likely existence of irisin in humans, revealing more plausible mechanisms of Fndc5 protein translation and processing as compared to possible expression from an inefficient mutated ATA start codon.

== Function ==
Exercise causes increased expression in muscle of peroxisome proliferator-activated receptor gamma coactivator 1 alpha (PGC-1alpha), which is involved in adaptation to exercise. In mice, this causes production of the FNDC5 protein which is cleaved to give a new product irisin. Due to its production through a mechanism initiated by muscular contraction, irisin has been classified as a myokine.

=== Tissues ===
==== Fat ====
Based on the findings that FNDC5 induces thermogenin expression in fat cells, overexpression of FNDC5 in the liver of mice prevents diet-induced weight gain, and FNDC5 mRNA levels are elevated in human muscle samples after exercise, it has been proposed that irisin promotes the conversion of white fat to brown fat in humans, which would make it a health-promoting hormone. While this proposal has been challenged by evidence finding FNDC5 is upregulated only in highly active elderly humans, more recent literature has supported the hypothesis of FNDC5 and irisin having a necessary role in exercise related benefits.

==== Bones ====
In mice, irisin released from skeletal muscle during exercise acts directly on bone by increasing cortical bone mineral density, bone perimeter and polar moment of inertia. Irisin regulates bone remodeling and bone metabolism in animal models and humans.

==== Cognitive effects ====
Irisin was shown to be a critical regulator of beneficial cognitive effects of physical exercise in rodents.

=== Molecular interactions ===
FNDC5 is known to interact with various different molecules. In exercise related effects, PGC-1alpha induces FNDC5 gene expression through ERRα availability and that exercise leads to increased transcription of Pgc-1α and Errα, thus increased transcription of Fndc5. Additionally, FNDC5 is a positive regulator of BDNF expression and can influence BDNF expression in the brain even when peripherally delivered by adenoviral vectors.

Irisin promotes conversion of white adipose tissue (WAT) to brown adipose tissue (BAT) by increasing UCP1 expression. A 2016 in vitro study of white and brown fat cell tissue found dose-related upregulation of a protein called UCP1 that contributes to the browning of white fat and found other markers that would indicate that the white cells were browning and that fat cells were more metabolically active. Many of the stem cells became a type of cell that matures into bone. The tissue treated with irisin produced about 40 percent fewer mature fat cells.

Irisin also interacts with BDNF in terms of regulating its levels in the brain. In a recent study, expression of BDNF in the primary hippocampal nerve cells was observed to decrease as glucose concentration and glucose exposure time increased, or in the diabetic rat conditions. The vitality of these primary hippocampal nerve cells from diabetic rats was markedly decreased when BDNF levels were low but improved following irisin treatment. Thus, irisin was found to positively regulate the expression of BDNF and negatively influence the levels of GHbA1c (human glycated hemoglobin A1c) and AGEs, suggesting that irisin influences cognitive dysfunction in rats with type 2 diabetes by regulating the expression of BDNF and glycometabolism. It appears that these proteins are connected and related to each other in terms of cardiovascular/metabolic diseases, such as hypertension and diabetes.

== See also ==
- GW 501516
