= Mitochondrial uncoupling protein 4 =

Protein-coding gene in the species Homo sapiens

SLC25A27

Identifiers
- Aliases: SLC25A27, solute carrier family 25, member 27, UCP4, solute carrier family 25 member 27
- External IDs: OMIM: 613725; MGI: 1921261; GeneCards: SLC25A27

Gene location (Human)
Chr.	Chromosome 6 (human)
Band	6p12.3	Start	46,652,915 bp
Band	6p12.3	End	46,678,190 bp

Gene location (Mouse)
Chr.	Chromosome 17 (mouse)
Band	17|17 B3	Start	43,641,891 bp
Band	17|17 B3	End	43,667,214 bp
RNA expression pattern
Bgee	Human / Mouse (ortholog); Top expressed in: gastric mucosa; anterior pituitary; left ovary; right uterine tube; right ovary; cerebellar hemisphere; right hemisphere of cerebellum; left lobe of thyroid gland; body of uterus; right lobe of thyroid gland / Top expressed in: Rostral migratory stream; hand; otolith organ; utricle; superior cervical ganglion; superior frontal gyrus; visual cortex; primary visual cortex; neural layer of retina; ganglionic eminence; More reference expression data
BioGPS	n/a
Gene ontology
Molecular function	transmembrane transporter activity
Cellular component	membrane; apical part of cell; soma; mitochondrion; mitochondrial inner membrane; integral component of membrane; mitochondrial membranes
Biological process	negative regulation of mitochondrial calcium ion concentration; cellular triglyceride homeostasis; positive regulation of cell population proliferation; regulation of glucose import; neuron death; negative regulation of mitochondrial membrane potential; inner ear development; negative regulation of apoptotic process; mitochondrial transport; response to cold; regulation of mitochondrial membrane potential; transmembrane transport; proton transmembrane transport; transport
Sources:Amigo / QuickGO
Orthologs
Databases	NCBI: entry; OMA: entry
Species	Human	Mouse
Entrez	9481	74011
Ensembl	ENSG00000153291	ENSMUSG00000023912
UniProt	O95847	Q9D6D0
RefSeq (mRNA)	NM_001204051; NM_001204052; NM_004277	NM_028711; NM_001357122; NM_001357123
RefSeq (protein)	NP_001190980; NP_001190981; NP_004268	NP_082987; NP_001344051; NP_001344052
Location (UCSC)	Chr 6: 46.65 – 46.68 Mb	Chr 17: 43.64 – 43.67 Mb
PubMed search
- Wikidata
View/Edit Human	View/Edit Mouse

Mitochondrial uncoupling protein 4 (UCP4) is a protein that in humans is encoded by the SLC25A27 gene.

== Tissue distribution ==
SLC25A27 transcripts are detected exclusively in brain tissue. Expression of UCP4 is developmentally regulated and influenced by environmental conditions. This brain-specific expression pattern distinguishes UCP4 from other uncoupling proteins, which are found in a wider range of tissues.

== Structure ==
UCP4 shares the typical structural features of the MACP family, including three homologous protein domains that span the inner mitochondrial membrane. However, reconstituted UCP4 has been observed to adopt a conformation distinct from other uncoupling proteins, suggesting potential functional or regulatory differences.

== Function ==
Mitochondrial uncoupling proteins (UCPs) are part of the mitochondrial anion carrier protein (MACP) family. They mediate proton leak across the inner mitochondrial membrane, uncoupling oxidative phosphorylation from ATP synthesis and dissipating energy as heat. This process lowers the mitochondrial membrane potential and contributes to thermogenesis and regulation of reactive oxygen species. UCPs facilitate the transport of anions from the mitochondrial matrix to the intermembrane space, and the reverse flow of protons. Their activity is modulated by various ligands; for example, UCP4 is activated by fatty acids and inhibited by purine nucleotides.

== See also ==
- Solute carrier family
- Uncoupling protein
