= Thermogenesis =

Process of heat production within organisms

Thermogenesis is the process of heat production in the metabolism of organisms. It occurs in all warm-blooded animals, and also in a few species of thermogenic plants such as the Eastern skunk cabbage, the Voodoo lily (Sauromatum venosum), and the giant water lilies of the genus Victoria. The lodgepole pine dwarf mistletoe, Arceuthobium americanum, disperses its seeds explosively through thermogenesis. Thermoregulation is an important component of a homeothermic animal's resting metabolic rate (RMR) and serves to defend body temperature within narrow limits at low or high ambient temperature. The energy used to sustain thermogenesis is obtained in cellular respiration when nutrients such as glucose or fatty acids are oxidized to generate molecules of ATP.

== Types ==
Depending on whether or not they are initiated through locomotion and intentional movement of the muscles, thermogenic processes can be classified as one of the following:

- Obligatory thermogenesis: Heat generated from energy expenditure for vital metabolic processes necessary to sustain an organism at rest. Obligatory thermogenesis includes both cellular work (e.g., active transport, cell division, DNA replication) and organ work (e.g., myocardial contractility, liver detoxification, renal filitration).
- Exercise activity thermogenesis (EAT)
- Non-exercise activity thermogenesis (NEAT): Energy expended for any spontaneous physical activity that is not a structured exercise routine or sports-like exercise. This can include but is not limited to walking, leisure activities, fidgeting, and maintaining posture.
- Diet-induced thermogenesis (DIT): Energy expended to process the nutrients in food.

=== Shivering ===
One method animals use to raise temperature is through shivering. When an animal shivers, almost all the energy being expended shows up as heat. While shivering does not produce useful motion, it is still valuable for raising an animal's body temperature. For example, shivering is the process by which the body temperature of hibernating mammals (such as some bats and ground squirrels) is raised as these animals emerge from hibernation.

=== Non-shivering ===
Activation cascade of thermogenin in cells of brown adipose tissue

Non-shivering thermogenesis occurs in brown adipose tissue (brown fat) that is present in almost all eutherians (swine being the only exception currently known). Brown adipose tissue has a unique uncoupling protein (thermogenin, also known as uncoupling protein 1) that allows for the synthesis of ATP to be uncoupled from the production of protons (H^{+}), thus enabling mitochondria to burn fatty acids and oxygen to generate heat. The atomic structure of human uncoupling protein 1 UCP1 has been solved by cryogenic-electron microscopy. The structure has the typical fold of a member of the SLC25 family. UCP1 is locked in a cytoplasmic-open state by guanosine triphosphate in a pH-dependent manner, preventing proton leak.

High levels of free fatty acids within cells play a pivotal role in regulating mitochondrial uncoupling by stimulating proton leak. The stimulation of beta oxidation by increased levels of hormones such as thyroid hormone or norepinephrine helps to activate non-shivering thermogenesis during cold exposure. In this process, free fatty acids (derived from triacylglycerols) remove purine (ADP, GDP and others) inhibition of thermogenin, which causes an influx of H^{+} into the matrix of the mitochondrion and bypasses the ATP synthase channel. This uncouples oxidative phosphorylation, and the energy from the proton motive force is dissipated as heat rather than producing ATP from ADP, which would store chemical energy for the body's use. Thermogenesis can also be produced by leakage of the sodium-potassium pump and the Ca^{2+} pump. Thermogenesis is contributed to by futile cycles, such as the simultaneous occurrence of lipogenesis and lipolysis or glycolysis and gluconeogenesis. In a broader context, futile cycles can be influenced by activity/rest cycles such as the Summermatter cycle.

Acetylcholine stimulates muscle to raise metabolic rate.

The low demands of thermogenesis mean that free fatty acids draw, for the most part, on lipolysis as the method of energy production.

A comprehensive list of human and mouse genes regulating cold-induced thermogenesis (CIT) in living animals (in vivo) or tissue samples (ex vivo) has been assembled and is available in CITGeneDB.

== Evolutionary history ==
=== In avians and eutherians ===
The biological processes which allow for thermogenesis in animals did not evolve from a singular, common ancestor. Rather, avian (birds) and eutherian (placental mammalian) lineages developed the ability to perform thermogenesis independently through separate evolutionary processes. The fact that the same evolutionary character evolved independently in two different lineages after their last known common ancestor means that thermogenic processes are classified as an example of convergent evolution. However, while both clades are capable of performing thermogenesis, the biological processes involved are different. The reason that avians and eutherians both developed the capacity to perform thermogenesis is a subject of ongoing study by evolutionary biologists, and two competing explanations have been proposed to explain why this character appears in both lineages.

One explanation for the convergence is the "aerobic capacity" model. This theory suggests that natural selection favored individuals with higher resting metabolic rates, and that as the metabolic capacity of birds and eutherians increased, they developed the capacity for endothermic thermogenesis. Researchers have linked high levels of oxygen consumption with high resting metabolic rates, suggesting that the two are directly correlated. Rather than animals developing the capacity to maintain high and stable body temperatures only to be able to thermoregulate without the aid of the environment, this theory suggests that thermogenesis is actually a by-product of natural selection for higher aerobic and metabolic capacities. These higher metabolic capacities may initially have evolved for the simple reason that animals capable of metabolizing more oxygen for longer periods of time would have been better suited to, for example, run from predators or gather food. This model explaining the development of thermogenesis is older and more widely accepted among evolutionary biologists who study thermogenesis.

The second explanation is the "parental care" model. This theory proposes that the convergent evolution of thermogenesis in birds and eutherians is based on shared behavioral traits. Specifically, birds and eutherians both provide high levels of parental care to young offspring. This high level of care is theorized to give new born or hatched animals the opportunity to mature more rapidly because they have to expend less energy to satisfy their food, shelter, and temperature needs. The "parental care" model thus proposes that higher aerobic capacity was selected for in parents as a means of meeting the needs of their offspring. While the "parental care" model does differ from the "aerobic capacity" model, it shares some similarities in that both explanations for the rise of thermogenesis rest on natural selection favoring individuals with higher aerobic capacities for one reason or another. The primary difference between the two theories is that the "parental care" model proposes that a specific biological function (childcare) resulted in selective pressure for higher metabolic rates.

Despite both relying on similar explanations for the process by which organisms gained the capacity to perform non-shivering thermogenesis, neither of these explanations has secured a large enough consensus to be considered completely authoritative on convergent evolution of NST in birds and mammals, and scientists continue to conduct studies which support both positions.

=== Non-shivering thermogenesis ===
Brown Adipose Tissue (BAT) thermogenesis is one of the two known forms of non-shivering thermogenesis (NST). This type of heat-generation occurs only in eutherians, not in birds or other thermogenic organisms. BAT NST occurs when Uncoupling Protein 1 (UCP1) uncouples oxidative phosphorylation in eutherians' bodies resulting in the generation of heat through a "proton leak" (Berg et al., 2006, p. 1178). This process generally only begins in eutherians after they have been subjected to low temperatures for an extended period of time, after which the process allows an organism's body to maintain a high and stable temperature without a reliance on environmental thermoregulation mechanisms (such as sunlight/shade). Because eutherians are the only clade which store brown adipose tissue, scientists previously thought that UCP1 evolved in conjunction with brown adipose tissue. However, recent studies have shown that UCP1 can also be found in non-eutherians like fish, birds, and reptiles. This discovery means that UCP1 probably existed in a common ancestor before the radiation of the eutherian lineage. Since this evolutionary split, though, UCP1 has evolved independently in eutherians, through a process which scientists believe was not driven by natural selection, but rather by neutral processes like genetic drift.

=== Evolution of Skeletal-Muscle Non-Shivering Thermogenesis ===
The second form of NST occurs in skeletal muscle. While eutherians use both BAT and skeletal muscle NST for thermogenesis, birds only use the latter form. This process has also been shown to occur in rare instances in fish. In skeletal muscle NST, Calcium ions slip across muscle cells to generate heat. Even though BAT NST was originally thought to be the only process by which animals could maintain endothermy, scientists now suspect that skeletal muscle NST was the original form of the process and that BAT NST developed later. Though scientists once also believed that only birds maintained their body temperatures using skeletal muscle NST, research in the late 2010s showed that mammals and other eutherians also use this process when they do not have adequate stores of brown adipose tissue in their bodies.

Skeletal muscle NST might also be used to maintain body temperature in heterothermic mammals during states of torpor or hibernation. Given that early eutherians and the reptiles which later evolved into avian lineages were either heterothermic or ectothermic, both forms of NST are thought not to have developed fully until after the K-pg extinction roughly 66 million years ago. However, some estimates place the evolution of these characters earlier, at roughly 100 mya. It is most likely that the process of evolving the capacity for thermogenesis as it currently exists was a process which began prior to the K-pg extinction and ended well after. The fact that skeletal muscle NST is common among eutherians during periods of torpor and hibernation further supports the theory that this form of thermogenesis is older than BAT NST. This is because early eutherians would not have had the capacity for non-shivering thermogenesis as it currently exists, so they more frequently used torpor and hibernation as means of thermal regulation, relying on systems which, in theory, predate BAT NST. However, there remains no consensus among evolutionary biologists on the order in which the two processes evolved, nor an exact timeframe for their evolution.

== Regulation ==
Non-shivering thermogenesis is regulated mainly by the synergistic effect of thyroid hormone (TH) and the sympathetic nervous system (SNS) on brown adipose tissue. When BAT is stimulated by norepinephrine released by the SNS, this triggers an intracellular cascade which increases the conversion of the less active thyroxine (T4) to the more active triiodothyronine (T3) within the tissue. T3 then increases the expression of UCP1 in BAT, enhancing heat production. TH also increases obligatory thermogenesis through stimulating metabolism, energy production and utilization. Other sources of heat production stimulated by TH include the sodium-potassium pump, and calcium ion cycling in muscle. Rising insulin levels after eating may be responsible for diet-induced thermogenesis (thermic effect of food) through increased glucose uptake. Intranasal insulin has been shown to increase metabolic rate by inhibiting warm-sensitive hypothalamic neurons, whose role is to lower body temperature in response to perceived warmth. Inhibiting these neurons stimulates BAT thermogenesis. Progesterone also increases body temperature.

While commonly thought to directly stimulate BAT thermogenesis, the mechanism by which leptin increases thermogenesis is through inhibiting torpor, which raises the body temperature threshold where heat-conserving mechanisms such as vasoconstriction will start to occur. Leptin deficient mice perceive a deficit in energy, triggering the body to conserve energy by reducing metabolic rate (torpor), which also lowers the body temperature threshold.

== Thermogenic Compounds as a Treatment for Obesity ==
There are several pharmaceuticals that can stimulate different types of thermogenesis, with varying levels of safety. Caffeine, for example, has been shown to increase both resting metabolic rate and energy expenditure from exercise, thus enhancing obligatory thermogenesis as well as exercise-induced thermogenesis. Caffeine has also been used in combination with Ephedrine, a sympathomimetic, and aspirin, a mitochondrial uncoupler, to promote weight loss and has shown some clinical efficacy. Ephedrine, due to increased risk of side effects such as hypertension, tachycardia, and stroke contributing to increased risk of death or permanent disability, was banned by the FDA in 2004. Caffeine is generally considered to be safe at doses up to 400 mg/day, with increased risk of cardiac events and seizures with increasing dose.

2,4-Dinitrophenol (DNP) is another uncoupler, which is much more potent than aspirin, and also more toxic, with a risk of triggering hyperthermia, tachycardia, and tachypnea which eventually is fatal. The chemical uncoupling of oxidative phosphorylation by DNP causes low ATP in cells by allowing protons to leak through the mitochondrial membrane instead of being used in ATP synthase, which leads to loss of energy as heat, triggering rapid catabolism of fats and carbohydrates (and thus weight loss) to replenish ATP levels, which further amplifies heat production. It has historically been used as a weight loss agent but is still widely available, mainly through online pharmacies, despite being banned for human consumption in 1938 due its toxicity.

== Thermogenesis from white adipose tissue ==
A novel and interesting method named the thermogenin-like system (TLS) has recently been proposed to produce thermogenesis from white adipose tissue or from other substantial tissues (such as endothelial or muscle cells). Ultimately, this could lead to new therapeutic methods for treating morbid obesity or severe diabetes. The proposed model is purely theoretical and relies on the use of light-activated PoXeR pumps integrated into the inner membrane of mitochondria. These pumps allow the passage of protons in such a way that the proton motive force is reduced. This would enable greater consumption of blood glucose from white adipose, endothelial, or muscle cells, thereby potentially lowering blood glucose levels. The explanation is that glycolysis is accelerated when glucose enters the cells and undergoes the Krebs cycle in the mitochondria. Since muscle cells have many mitochondria, it is also interesting to express PoXeR pumps in this tissue.

However, the method is invasive, relies on gene therapy, and requires several clinical trials as well as hospitalization to integrate the system at the level of white or muscle adipose tissue in the abdominal fat. It is also a light-responsive system. Since light does not penetrate the skin from the outside, the system must include an under-skin component with alternating activation of green light for a certain duration, followed by deactivation for another period. This cycle repeats over several weeks, particularly to recharge the light system. To ensure that ATP levels do not drop too low (otherwise the cell dies), the system self-regulates. Indeed, for light to be activated in the system, it is necessary to have a mechanism that continuously provides light without significantly lowering ATP levels. As luciferase can emit light in exchange for ATP, if ATP levels decrease too drastically, the light stops, ATP levels rise again, and the light is reactivated to induce thermogenesis.

Independently, Glen Jeffery and Michael B. Powner studied in 2024 the impact of light on mitochondria in order to reduce blood glucose levels. This work is quite similar to that of Daoudi Rédoane.

== See also ==
- Thermoregulation
