= Brown adipose tissue =

Type of adipose tissue

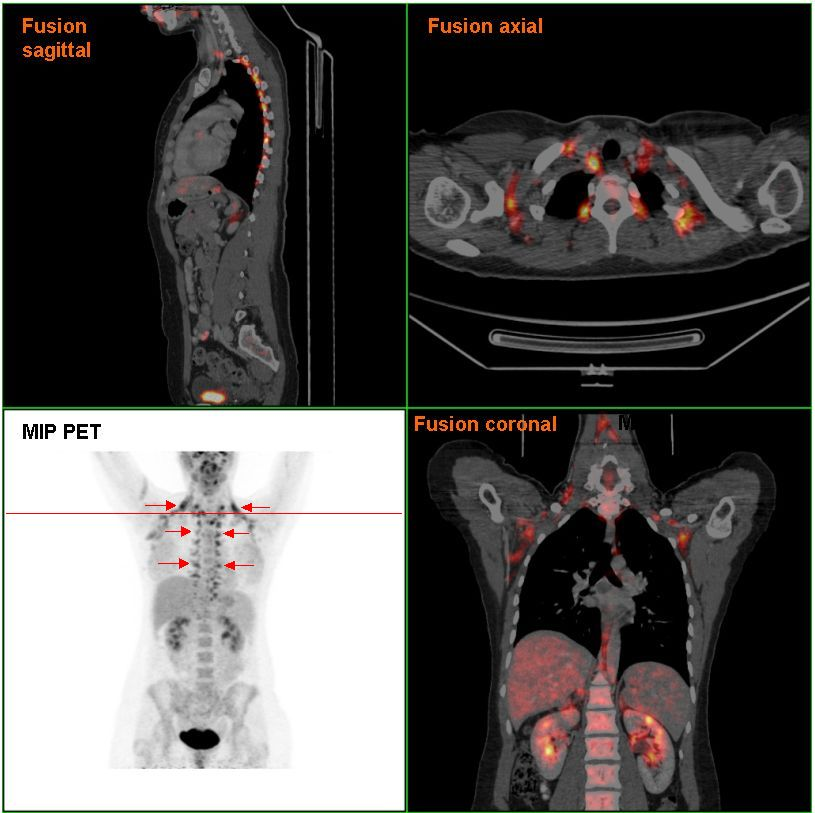
- Brown adipose tissue in a woman shown in a FDG PET/CT exam

Details

Identifiers
- Latin: textus adiposus fuscus
- Acronym: BAT
- MeSH: D002001
- TH: H2.00.03.4.00004
- FMA: 20118

Brown adipose tissue (BAT) or brown fat makes up the adipose organ together with white adipose tissue (or white fat). Brown adipose tissue is found in almost all mammals.

Classification of brown fat refers to two distinct cell populations with similar functions. The first shares a common embryological origin with muscle cells, found in larger "classic" deposits. The second develops from white adipocytes that are stimulated by the sympathetic nervous system. These adipocytes are found interspersed in white adipose tissue and are also named 'beige' or 'brite' (for "brown in white").

Brown adipose tissue is especially abundant in newborns and in hibernating mammals. It is also present and metabolically active in adult humans, but its prevalence decreases as humans age. Its primary function is thermoregulation. In addition to heat produced by shivering muscle, brown adipose tissue produces heat by non-shivering thermogenesis. The therapeutic targeting of brown fat for the treatment of human obesity is an active research field.

In contrast to white adipocytes, which contain a single lipid droplet, brown adipocytes contain numerous smaller droplets and a much higher number of (iron-containing) mitochondria, which gives the tissue its color. Brown fat also contains more capillaries than white fat. These supply the tissue with oxygen and nutrients and distribute the produced heat throughout the body.

It can now be detected using imaging techniques like positron emission tomography and computed tomography (PET-CT). This technique can measure the change in glucose level, as a marker for BAT metabolism.

== Location and classification ==
BAT's presence in adult humans was discovered in 2003 during FDG-PET scans to detect metastatic cancers. Using these scans and data from human autopsies, several deposits have been identified. In infants, brown adipose tissue deposits include: interscapular, supraclavicular, suprarenal, pericardial, para-aortic and around the pancreas, kidney and trachea. These deposits gradually get more white fat-like during adulthood. In adults, the deposits that are most often detected in FDG-PET scans are the supraclavicular, paravertebral, mediastinal, para-aortic and suprarenal ones. It remains to be determined whether these deposits are 'classical' brown adipose tissue or beige/brite fat.

Brown fat in humans in the scientific and popular literature refers to two cell populations defined by both anatomical location and cellular morphology. Both share the presence of small lipid droplets and numerous iron-rich mitochondria, giving the brown appearance.

- "Classical" brown fat is found in highly vascularized deposits in somewhat consistent anatomical locations, such as between the shoulder blades, surrounding the kidneys, the neck, and supraclavicular area, and along the spinal cord. This is the smaller of the two types and has numerous small lipid droplets.
- Beige fat is the adrenergically inducible cell type that is dispersed throughout adipose tissue. It has greater variability in lipid droplet size and a greater proportion of mitochondria to lipid droplets than white fat, giving it a light brown appearance. In mouse and human organoid models, EPAC1 (exchange proteins directly activated by cAMP) was reported to preferentially increase the production of beige fat relative to WAT.

=== Development ===
The two types of brown fat cells have different origins. Both ultimately come from the middle embryo layer, mesoderm, also the source of myocytes (muscle cells), white adipocytes, and chondrocytes (cartilage cells).

The classic population of brown fat cells and muscle cells both seem to be derived from the same population of stem cells in the mesoderm, paraxial mesoderm. Both have the intrinsic capacity to activate the myogenic factor 5 (Myf5) promoter, a trait only associated with myocytes and this population of brown fat.

The inducible beige population is more similar to white adipocytes in origin. They derive from the lateral mesoderm and do not have the capacity to activate the Myf5 promoter. They may derive from the pericytes, the cells which surround the blood vessels that run through white fat tissue.

==== In vitro differentiation ====
Muscle cells that were cultured with the transcription factor PRDM16 were converted into brown fat cells (presumably classical-like), and brown fat cells without PRDM16 were converted into muscle cells.

Brown fat preadipocytes can be derived from pluripotent stem cells. This type of cell is commercially available as "i-HBrPAd". They are described as positive for PRDM16, without much information on whether they were derived from Myf5+ cells.

== Function ==
The mitochondria in a eukaryotic cell utilize fuels to produce adenosine triphosphate (ATP). This process involves storing energy as a proton gradient, also known as the proton motive force (PMF) generated by moving protons from the mitochondrial matrix (N or negative side) across the mitochondrial inner membrane to the mitochondrial intermembrane space (P or positive side) using the energy released by the electron transport chain. This proton gradient energy is used to synthesize ATP when the protons flow across the membrane (down their concentration gradient - from a region of high proton concentration to a region of lower proton concentration) through the ATP synthase complex; this is known as chemiosmosis.

In endotherms, body heat is maintained by signaling the mitochondria to allow protons to move back into the mitochondrial matrix (down their concentration gradient - from a region of high proton concentration to a region of lower proton concentration) without producing ATP (proton leak). This can occur since an alternative return route for the protons exists through an uncoupling protein in the inner membrane. This protein, known as uncoupling protein 1 (thermogenin) - which is unique to brown adipose tissue, facilitates the return of the protons after they have been actively pumped out of the mitochondrial matrix by the electron transport chain. This alternative route for protons uncouples oxidative phosphorylation and the energy in the PMF is instead released as heat.

To some degree, all cells of endotherms give off heat, especially when body temperature is below a regulatory threshold. However, brown adipose tissue is highly specialized for this non-shivering thermogenesis. First, each cell has a higher number of mitochondria compared to more typical cells. Second, these mitochondria have a higher-than-normal concentration of thermogenin in the inner membrane.

=== Infants ===
In neonates (newborn infants), brown fat makes up about 5% of the body mass and is located on the back, along the upper half of the spine and toward the shoulders. It is of great importance to avoid hypothermia, as lethal cold is a major death risk for premature neonates. Numerous factors make infants more susceptible to cold than adults:

- A higher ratio of body surface area (proportional to heat loss) to body volume (proportional to heat production)
- A higher proportional surface area of the head
- A low amount of musculature and the inability to shiver
- A lack of thermal insulation, e.g., subcutaneous fat and fine body hair (especially in prematurely born children)
- An inability to move away from cold areas, air currents or heat-draining materials
- An inability to use additional ways of keeping warm (e.g., drying their skin, putting on clothing, moving into warmer areas, or performing physical exercise)
- A nervous system that is not fully developed and does not respond quickly and/or properly to cold (e.g., by contracting blood vessels in and just below the skin: vasoconstriction).

Heat production in brown fat provides an infant with an alternative means of heat regulation.

=== Adults ===
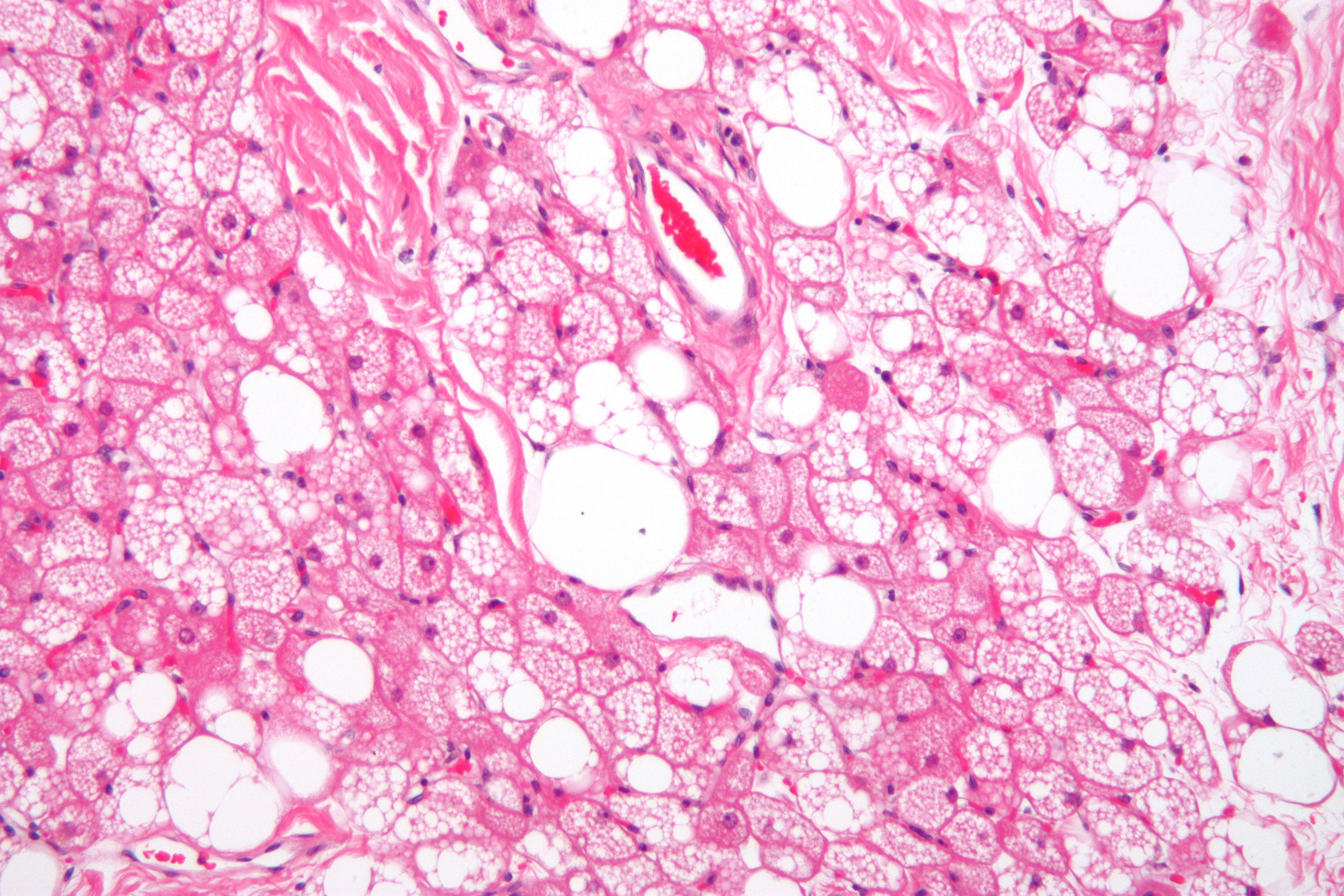
Micrograph of a hibernoma, a benign tumour thought to arise from brown fat (haematoxylin and eosin stain)

It was believed that after infants grow up, most of the mitochondria (which are responsible for the brown color) in brown adipose tissue disappear, and the tissue becomes similar in function and appearance to white fat. In rare cases, brown fat continues to grow, rather than involuting; this leads to a tumour known as a hibernoma. It is now known that brown fat is related not to white fat, but to skeletal muscle.

Studies using positron emission tomography scanning of adult humans have shown that brown adipose tissue is still present in most adults in the upper chest and neck (especially paravertebrally). The remaining deposits become more visible (increasing tracer uptake, meaning more metabolically active) with cold exposure, and less visible if an adrenergic beta blocker is given before the scan. These discoveries could lead to new methods of weight loss, since brown fat takes calories from normal fat and burns it. Scientists have been able to stimulate brown fat growth in mice. One study of APOE knock out mice showed cold exposure could promote atherosclerotic plaque growth and instability. The study mice were subjected to sustained low temperatures of 4 °C for 8 weeks which may have caused a stress condition, due to rapid forced change rather than a safe acclimatisation, that can be used to understand the effect on adult humans of modest reductions of ambient temperature of just 5 to 10 °C. Furthermore, several newer studies have documented the substantial benefits of cold exposure in multiple species including humans, for example researchers concluded that "activation of brown adipose tissue is a powerful therapeutic avenue to ameliorate hyperlipidaemia and protect from atherosclerosis" and that brown fat activation reduces plasma triglyceride and cholesterol levels and attenuates diet-induced atherosclerosis development.

Long-term studies of adult humans are needed to establish a balance of benefit and risk, in combination with historical research of living conditions of recent human generations prior to the current increase of poor health related to excessive accumulation of white fat. Pharmacological approaches using β3-adrenoceptor agonists have been shown to enhance glucose metabolic activity of brown adipose tissue in rodents.

Additionally research has shown:

- Brown adipose tissue activation improves glucose homeostasis and insulin sensitivity in humans suggesting that anyone with impaired insulin function might benefit from BAT activation; however, there is broader application given research showing even mildly elevated blood glucose in healthy non-diabetic humans is associated with damage over time of many organs such as eyes, tendons, endothelial/cardiovascular system and brain, and results in higher levels of damaging advanced glycation end products.
- Brown adipose tissue activation may play an important role in bone health and bone density.
- Brown adipose tissue activation through cold exposure increases adiponectin levels, just two hours of cold exposure resulted in a 70% increase in circulating adiponectin in adult men. Centenarians (both men and women) and their offspring have been found to have genetics that boost adiponectin, and they have higher circulating adiponectin, suggesting a link between longevity and adiponectin production. In addition, high concentrations of plasma adiponectin in centenarians was associated with favorable metabolic indicators, and with lower levels of C-reactive protein and E-selectin.
- Cold exposure increases circulating irisin. Irisin improves insulin sensitivity, increases bone quality and quantity, is involved in the building of lean muscle mass, and helps reduce obesity by converting white fat to brown fat, providing many of the same benefits of exercise. Healthy centenarians are characterized by increased serum irisin levels, whereas levels of this hormone were found to be significantly lower in young patients with myocardial infarction. These findings may prompt further research into the role played by irisin not only in vascular disorders but also in life span modulation.
- Fibroblast growth factor 21 (FGF-21) production has been documented as a pathway to longevity. BAT activation through cold exposure up-regulates circulating fibroblast growth factor 21 (FGF21) in humans by 37%. FGF21 improves insulin sensitivity and glucose metabolism which may partially explain its longevity promoting benefits.
- Under basal environmental temperatures, HDAC3 primes expression of UCP1 and the brown fat thermogenic program to ensure acute cold survival through the deacetylation and activation of PGC-1alpha.
- Cold exposure increases SIRT1 phosphorylation/activity in both skeletal muscle and BAT, increasing thermogenesis and insulin sensitivity through deacetylation of PGC-1alpha and other protein targets. Elevated SIRT1 levels in people are associated with increased human longevity. SIRT1 (and the other sirtuins) have many metabolic effects, but an important one for improving health and longevity is the fact that SIRT1 increases insulin sensitivity and glucose control in skeletal muscles, triggers the browning of white fat and increases BAT activity.

== Other animals ==
The interscapular brown adipose tissue is commonly referred to as the hibernating gland. Whilst believed by many to be a type of gland, it is actually a collection of adipose tissues lying between the scapulae of rodentine mammals. Composed of brown adipose tissue and divided into two lobes, it resembles a primitive gland, regulating the output of a variety of hormones. The function of the tissue appears to be involved in the storage of medium to small lipid chains for consumption during hibernation, the smaller lipid structure allowing for a more rapid path of energy production than glycolysis.

In studies where the interscapular brown adipose tissue of rats were lesioned, it was demonstrated that the rats had difficulty regulating their normal body-weight.

The longest-lived small mammals, bats (30 years) and naked mole rats (32 years), all have remarkably high levels of brown adipose tissue and brown adipose tissue activity. However, brown fat is unlikely to play a role in body temperature regulation of many large-bodied mammals as the UCP1 gene, encoding for the key thermogenic protein of the tissue, has been inactivated in several lineages (e.g. horses, elephants, sea cows, whales and hyraxes). A reduced surface area to volume ratio among large-bodied species decreases heat loss in the cold, diminishing thermogenic demands required to defend body temperatures. UCP1 loss in other species (e.g. pangolins, armadillos, sloths and anteaters) may be linked to selection pressures favouring low metabolic rates.

== See also ==
- BMP7
- Irisin
- Orexin
- PRDM16
- List of distinct cell types in the adult human body
