= UCP2 =

Protein-coding gene in the species Homo sapiens

Identifiers
- Aliases: UCP2, BMIQ4, SLC25A8, UCPH, uncoupling protein 2
- External IDs: OMIM: 601693; MGI: 109354; GeneCards: UCP2

Gene location (Human)
Chr.	Chromosome 11 (human)
Band	11q13.4	Start	73,974,672 bp
Band	11q13.4	End	73,983,246 bp

Gene location (Mouse)
Chr.	Chromosome 7 (mouse)
Band	7 E2|7 54.36 cM	Start	100,142,544 bp
Band	7 E2|7 54.36 cM	End	100,151,227 bp
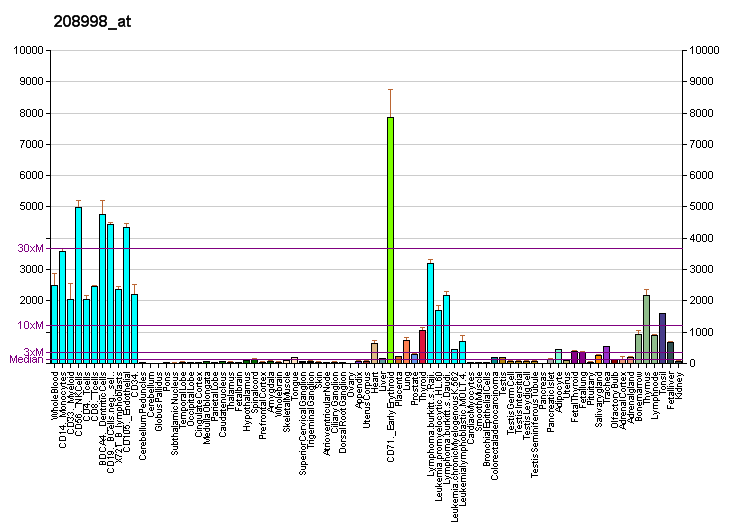

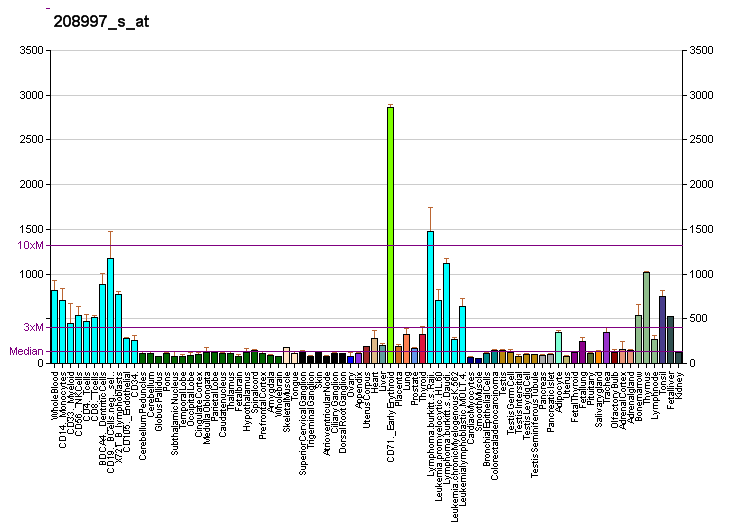
RNA expression pattern
Bgee	Human / Mouse (ortholog); Top expressed in: granulocyte; bronchial epithelial cell; right uterine tube; spleen; epithelium of nasopharynx; appendix; blood; trabecular bone; nasal epithelium; palpebral conjunctiva / Top expressed in: blood; epithelium of stomach; granulocyte; lip; pyloric antrum; fetal liver hematopoietic progenitor cell; mucous cell of stomach; tibiofemoral joint; molar; mesenteric lymph nodes; More reference expression data
BioGPS	More reference expression data
Gene ontology
Molecular function	protein binding; oxidative phosphorylation uncoupler activity; transmembrane transporter activity
Cellular component	cytoplasm; membrane; mitochondrial membranes; mitochondrial inner membrane; integral component of membrane; mitochondrion
Biological process	positive regulation of cell death; response to hypoxia; response to superoxide; response to fatty acid; female pregnancy; cellular response to amino acid starvation; negative regulation of insulin secretion involved in cellular response to glucose stimulus; ageing; negative regulation of apoptotic process; response to glucose; regulation of mitochondrial membrane potential; liver regeneration; cellular response to hormone stimulus; cellular response to insulin stimulus; cellular response to glucose stimulus; response to cold; mitochondrial transmembrane transport; adaptive thermogenesis; mitochondrial transport; proton transmembrane transport; positive regulation of cold-induced thermogenesis
Sources:Amigo / QuickGO
Orthologs
Databases	NCBI: entry; OMA: entry
Species	Human	Mouse
Entrez	7351	22228
Ensembl	ENSG00000175567	ENSMUSG00000033685
UniProt	P55851	P70406
RefSeq (mRNA)	NM_003355	NM_011671
RefSeq (protein)	NP_003346; NP_001368872; NP_001368873; NP_001368874; NP_001368876 NP_001368877; NP_001368878; NP_001368879	NP_035801
Location (UCSC)	Chr 11: 73.97 – 73.98 Mb	Chr 7: 100.14 – 100.15 Mb
PubMed search
- Wikidata
View/Edit Human	View/Edit Mouse

Mitochondrial uncoupling protein 2 is a protein that in humans is encoded by the UCP2 gene.

== Gene ==
Chromosomal order is 5'-UCP3-UCP2-3'.

== Tissue distribution ==
In contrast to UCP1 and UCP3, which are primarily expressed in adipose and smooth muscle, UCP2 is expressed on many different tissues including the kidney, liver, GI tract, brain, and skeletal muscle.

== Function ==
Mitochondrial uncoupling proteins (UCP) are members of the larger family of mitochondrial anion carrier proteins (MACP). UCPs separate, or uncouple, oxidative phosphorylation from ATP synthesis by dissipating the mitochondrial membrane potential as heat, also referred to as the mitochondrial proton leak. UCPs facilitate the transfer of anions from the inner to the outer mitochondrial membrane and the return transfer of protons from the outer to the inner mitochondrial membrane. They also reduce the mitochondrial membrane potential in mammalian cells, which reduces production of reactive oxygen species (ROS).

The exact mechanisms of anion transfer by UCPs are not known. UCPs contain the three homologous protein domains of MACPs. Although it was originally thought to play a role in non-shivering thermogenesis, obesity, diabetes and atherosclerosis, it now appears that the main function of UCP2 is the control of mitochondria-derived reactive oxygen species.

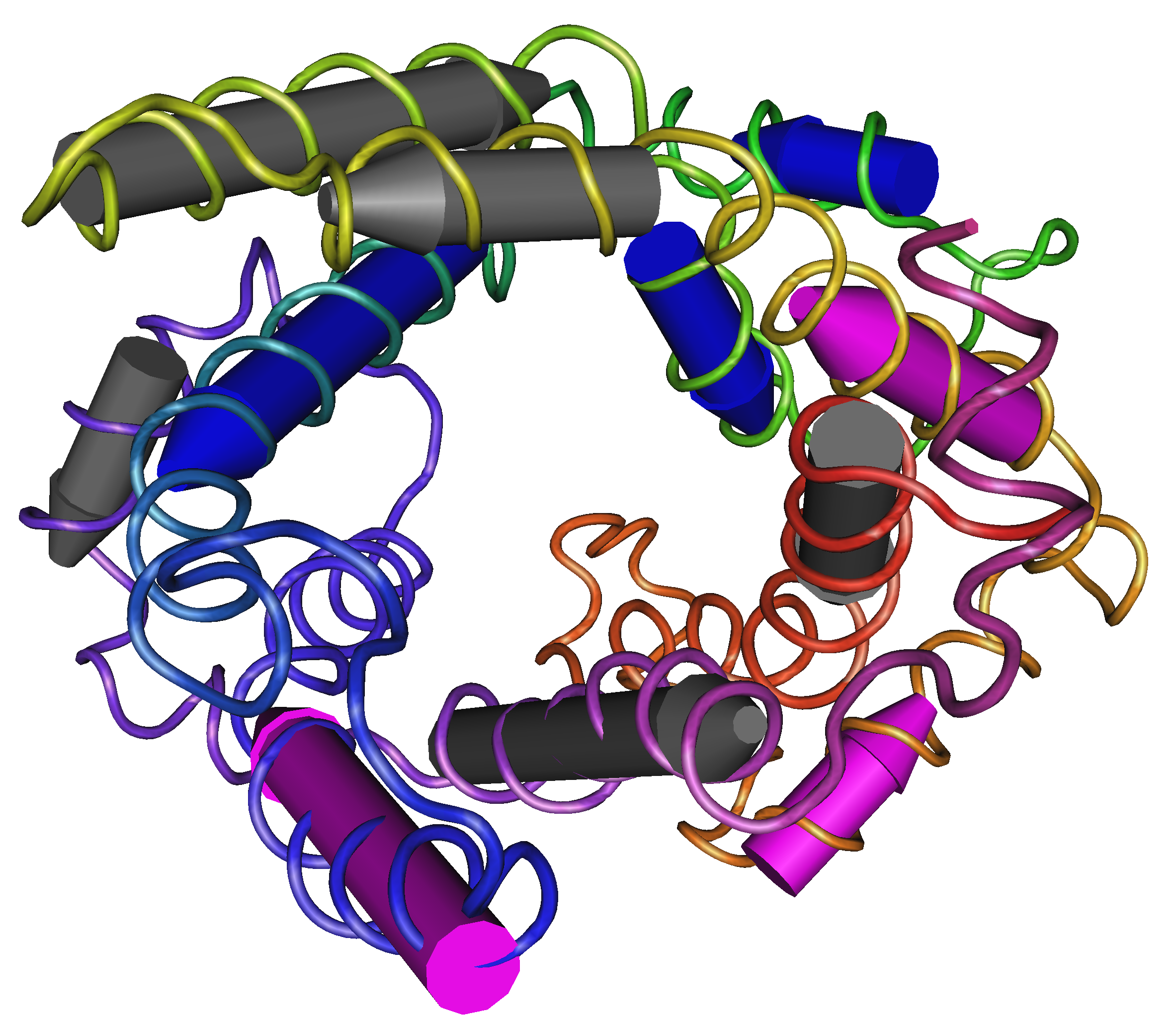
Mitochondrial Uncoupling Protein 2

== See also ==
- Uncoupling protein
