= Thermoregulation =

Ability of an organism to keep its body temperature within certain boundaries

Thermoregulation is the ability of an organism to keep its body temperature within certain boundaries, even when the surrounding temperature is very different. A thermoconforming organism, by contrast, simply adopts the surrounding temperature as its own body temperature, thus avoiding the need for internal thermoregulation. The internal thermoregulation process is one aspect of homeostasis: a state of dynamic stability in an organism's internal conditions, maintained far from thermal equilibrium with its environment (the study of such processes in zoology has been called physiological ecology).

If the body is unable to maintain a normal temperature and it increases significantly above normal, a condition known as hyperthermia occurs. Humans may experience lethal hyperthermia when the wet bulb temperature is sustained above 35 °C (95 °F) for six hours. Work in 2022 established by experiment that a wet-bulb temperature exceeding 30.55 °C caused uncompensable heat stress in young, healthy adult humans. The opposite condition, when body temperature decreases below normal levels, is known as hypothermia. It results when the homeostatic control mechanisms of heat within the body malfunction, causing the body to lose heat faster than producing it. Normal body temperature is around 37 °C (98.6 °F), and hypothermia sets in when the core body temperature gets lower than 35 °C (95 °F). Usually caused by prolonged exposure to cold temperatures, hypothermia is usually treated by methods that attempt to raise the body temperature back to a normal range.

It was not until the introduction of thermometers that any exact data on the temperature of animals could be obtained. It was then found that local differences were present, since heat production and heat loss vary considerably in different parts of the body, although the circulation of the blood tends to bring about a mean temperature of the internal parts. Hence, it is important to identify the parts of the body that most closely reflect the temperature of the internal organs. Also, for such results to be comparable, the measurements must be conducted under comparable conditions. The rectum has traditionally been considered to reflect most accurately the temperature of internal parts, or in some cases of sex or species, the vagina, uterus or bladder. Some animals undergo one of various forms of dormancy where the thermoregulation process temporarily allows the body temperature to drop, thereby conserving energy. Examples include hibernating bears and torpor in bats.

== Classification of animals by thermal characteristics ==
=== Endothermy vs. ectothermy ===
Thermoregulation in organisms runs along a spectrum from endothermy to ectothermy. Endotherms create most of their heat via metabolic processes and are colloquially referred to as warm-blooded. When the surrounding temperatures are cold, endotherms increase metabolic heat production to keep their body temperature constant, thus making the internal body temperature of an endotherm more or less independent of the temperature of the environment. Endotherms possess a larger number of mitochondria per cell than ectotherms, enabling them to generate more heat by increasing the rate at which they metabolize fats and sugars. Ectotherms use external sources of temperature to regulate their body temperature. They are colloquially referred to as cold-blooded despite the fact that their body temperatures often stay within the same temperature ranges as warm-blooded animals. Ectotherms are the opposite of endotherms when it comes to regulating internal temperatures. In ectotherms, the internal physiological sources of heat are of negligible importance; the biggest factor that enables them to maintain adequate body temperatures is due to environmental influences. Living in areas that maintain a constant temperature throughout the year, like the tropics or the ocean, has enabled ectotherms to develop behavioral mechanisms that respond to external temperatures, such as sunbathing to increase body temperature or seeking the cover of shade to lower body temperature.

=== Ectotherms ===
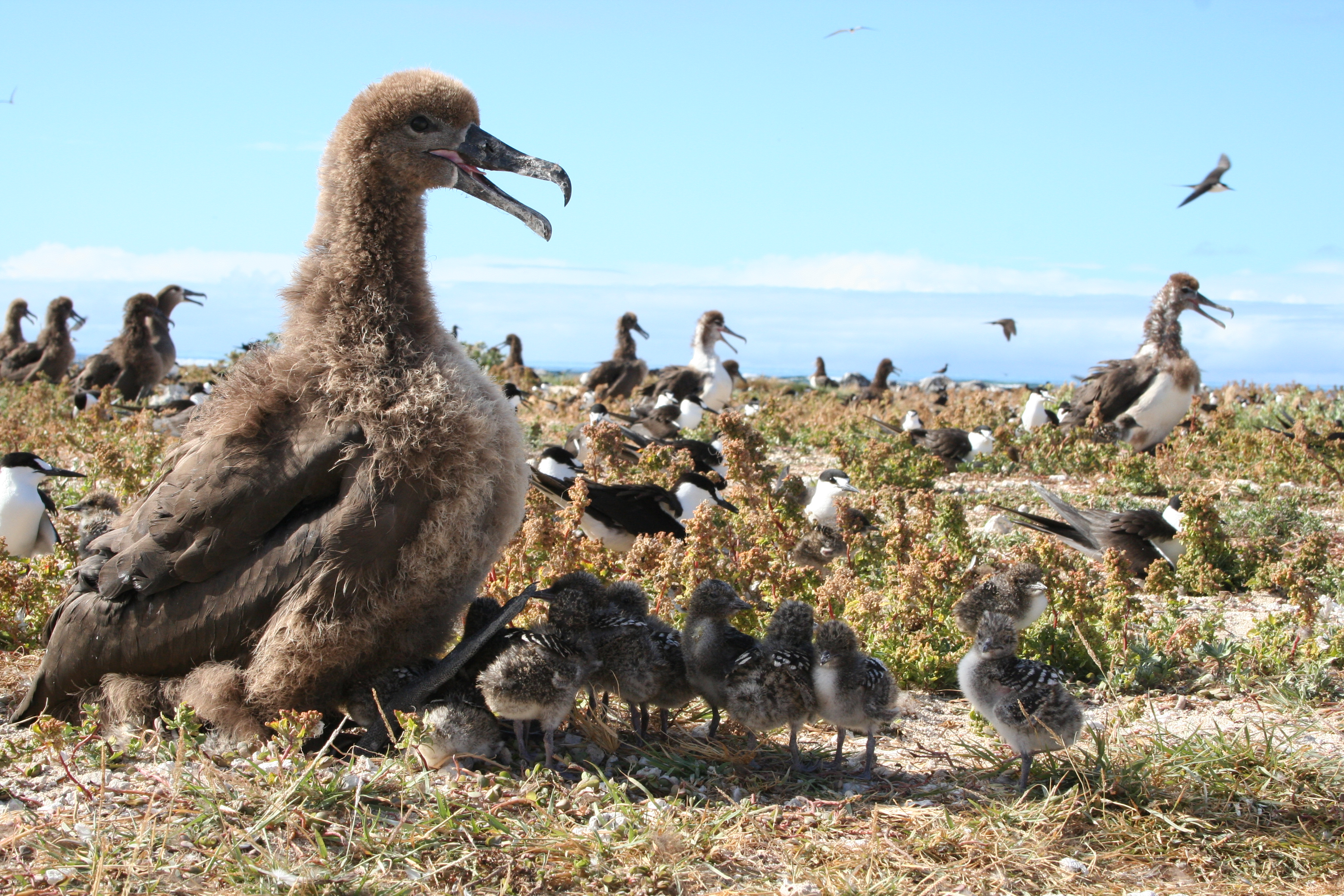
Seeking shade is one method of cooling. Here sooty tern chicks are using a black-footed albatross chick for shade.

=== Ectothermic cooling ===
- Vaporization:
  - Evaporation of sweat and other bodily fluids.
- Convection:
  - Increasing blood flow to body surfaces to maximize heat transfer across the advective gradient.
- Conduction:
  - Losing heat by being in contact with a colder surface. For instance:
    - Lying on cool ground.
    - Staying wet in a river, lake or sea.
    - Covering in cool mud.
- Radiation:
  - Releasing heat by radiating it away from the body.

=== Ectothermic heating (or minimizing heat loss) ===
The red line represents the air temperature. The purple line represents the body temperature of the lizard. The green line represents the base temperature of the burrow. Lizards are ectotherms and use behavioral adaptations to control their temperature. They regulate their behavior based on the temperature outside, if it is warm they will go outside up to a point and return to their burrow as necessary.

- Convection:
  - Climbing to higher ground up trees, ridges, rocks.
  - Entering a warm water or air current.
  - Building an insulated nest or burrow.
- Conduction:
  - Lying on a hot surface.
- Radiation:
  - Lying in the sun (heating this way is affected by the body's angle in relation to the sun).
  - Folding skin to reduce exposure.
  - Concealing wing surfaces.
  - Exposing wing surfaces.
- Insulation:
  - Changing shape to alter surface/volume ratio.
  - Inflating the body.

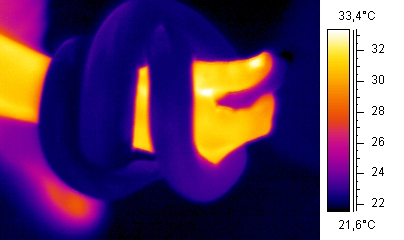
Thermographic image of a snake around an arm

To cope with low temperatures, some fish have developed the ability to remain functional even when the water temperature is below freezing; some use natural antifreeze or antifreeze proteins to resist ice crystal formation in their tissues. Amphibians and reptiles cope with heat gain by evaporative cooling and behavioral adaptations. An example of behavioral adaptation is that of a lizard lying in the sun on a hot rock in order to heat through radiation and conduction.

=== Endothermy ===
An endotherm is an animal that regulates its own body temperature, typically by keeping it at a constant level. To regulate body temperature, an organism may need to prevent heat gains in arid environments. Evaporation of water, either across respiratory surfaces or across the skin in those animals possessing sweat glands, helps in cooling body temperature to within the organism's tolerance range. Animals with a body covered by fur have a limited ability to sweat, relying heavily on panting to increase evaporation of water across the moist surfaces of the lungs and the tongue and mouth. Mammals like cats, dogs, and pigs rely on panting or other means for thermal regulation and have sweat glands only in their foot pads and snouts. The sweat produced on pads of paws and on palms and soles mostly serves to increase friction and enhance grip. Birds also counteract overheating by gular fluttering, or rapid vibrations of the gular (throat) skin. Down feathers trap warm air, acting as an excellent insulator just as hair in mammals acts as a good insulator. Mammalian skin is much thicker than that of birds and often has a continuous layer of insulating fat beneath the dermis. In marine mammals, such as whales, or animals that live in very cold regions, such as polar bears, this is called blubber. Dense coats found in desert endotherms also aid in preventing heat gain, such as in the case of camels.

A cold weather strategy is to temporarily decrease metabolic rate, decreasing the temperature difference between the animal and the air and thereby minimizing heat loss. Furthermore, having a lower metabolic rate is less energetically expensive. Many animals survive cold frosty nights through torpor, a short-term temporary drop in body temperature. Organisms, when presented with the problem of regulating body temperature, have not only behavioural, physiological, and structural adaptations but also a feedback system to trigger these adaptations to regulate temperature accordingly. The main features of this system are stimulus, receptor, modulator, effector and then the feedback of the newly adjusted temperature to the stimulus. This cyclical process aids in homeostasis.

=== Homeothermy compared with poikilothermy ===
Homeothermy and poikilothermy refer to how stable an organism's deep-body temperature is. Most endothermic organisms are homeothermic, like mammals. However, animals with facultative endothermy are often poikilothermic, meaning their temperature can vary considerably. Most fish are ectotherms, as most of their heat comes from the surrounding water. However, almost all fish are poikilothermic.

== Vertebrates ==
By numerous observations upon humans and other animals, John Hunter showed that the essential difference between the so-called warm-blooded and cold-blooded animals lies in the observed constancy of the temperature of the former and the observed variability of the temperature of the latter. Almost all birds and mammals have a high temperature almost constant and independent of that of the surrounding air (homeothermy). Almost all other animals display a variation of body temperature, dependent on their surroundings (poikilothermy).

=== Brain control ===
Thermoregulation in both ectotherms and endotherms is primarily controlled by the preoptic area (POA) of the anterior hypothalamus. In rats, neurons in the POA that express the prostaglandin E receptor 3 (EP3) play a crucial role in thermoregulation by regulating body temperature in both directions. EP3-expressing neurons in the POA provide continuous (tonic) inhibitory signals with the transmitter gamma-aminobutyric acid (GABA) to control sympathetic output neurons in the dorsomedial hypothalamus (DMH) and the rostral raphe pallidus nucleus of the medulla oblongata (rRPa). In a hot environment, the tonic inhibitory signals from EP3-expressing POA neurons are augmented to suppress sympathetic output. This results in suppressed heat production and dilated skin blood vessels, the latter of which promotes heat loss from the body surface. In a cold environment, the tonic inhibition from EP3-expressing POA neurons is attenuated to increase (disinhibit) sympathetic output. This results in increased heat production and constricted skin blood vessels to reduce heat loss. The tonic inhibition from EP3-expressing POA neurons is also attenuated by an action of prostaglandin E_{2} (PGE_{2}) to induce fever. This tonic inhibitory control of body temperature was first proposed as a fever mechanism in 2002 and was demonstrated to be the fundamental principle of body temperature homeostasis in mammals in 2022. Such homeostatic control is separate from the sensation of temperature.

=== In birds and mammals ===
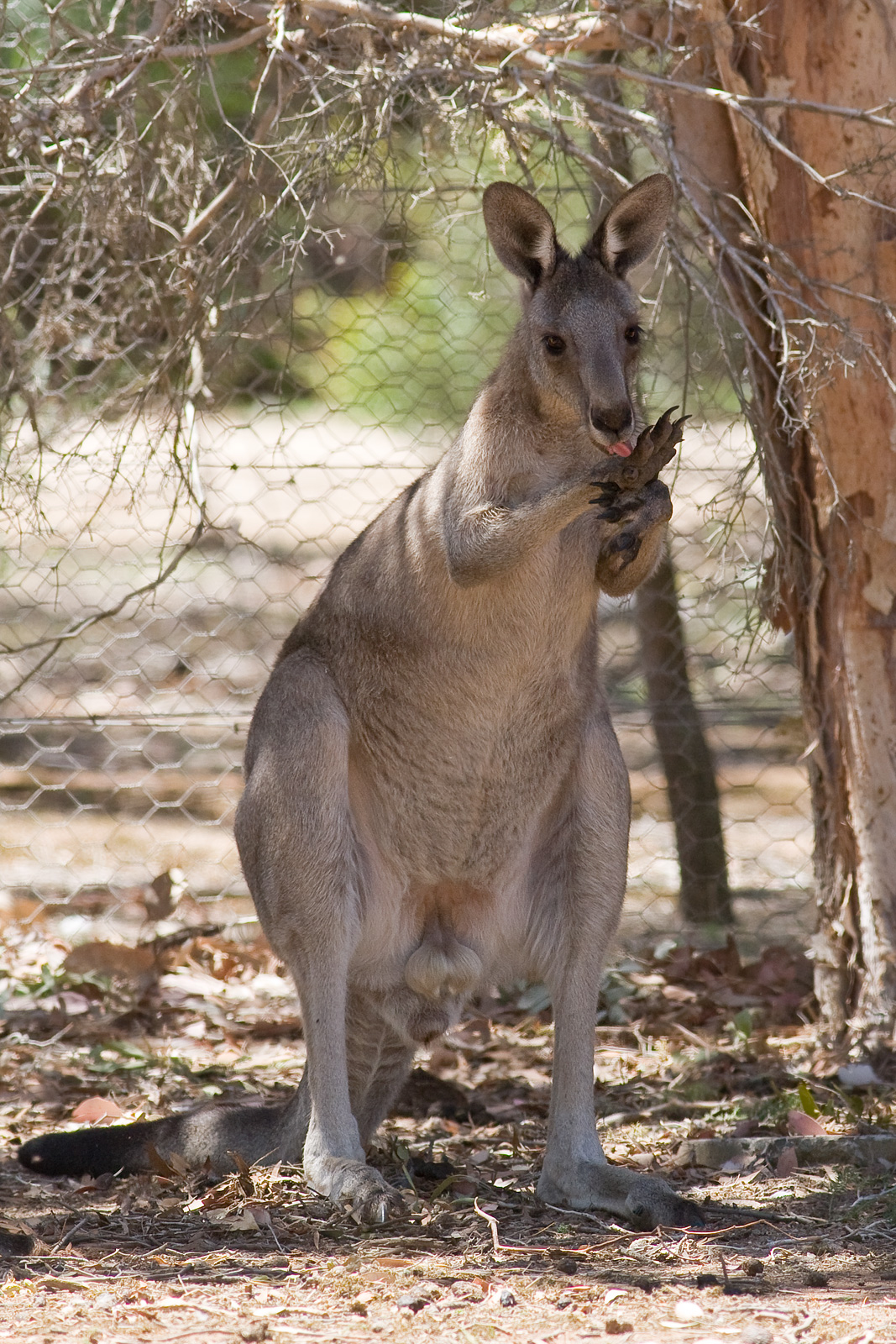
Kangaroo licking its arms to cool down

In cold environments, birds and mammals employ the following adaptations and strategies to minimize heat loss:

1. Using small smooth muscles (arrector pili in mammals), which are attached to feather or hair shafts; this distorts the surface of the skin making feather/hair shaft stand erect (called goose bumps or goose pimples) which slows the movement of air across the skin and minimizes heat loss.
2. Increasing body size to more easily maintain core body temperature (warm-blooded animals in cold climates tend to be larger than similar species in warmer climates (see Bergmann's rule))
3. Having the ability to store energy as fat for metabolism
4. Have shortened extremities
5. Have countercurrent blood flow in extremities – this is where the warm arterial blood travelling to the limb passes the cooler venous blood from the limb and heat is exchanged warming the venous blood and cooling the arterial (e.g., Arctic wolf or penguins)

In warm environments, birds and mammals employ the following adaptations and strategies to maximize heat loss:

1. Behavioural adaptations like living in burrows during the day and being nocturnal
2. Evaporative cooling by perspiration and panting or urohidrosis in the case of birds.
3. Storing fat reserves in one place (e.g., camel's hump) to avoid its insulating effect
4. Elongated, often vascularized extremities to conduct body heat to the air

In humans

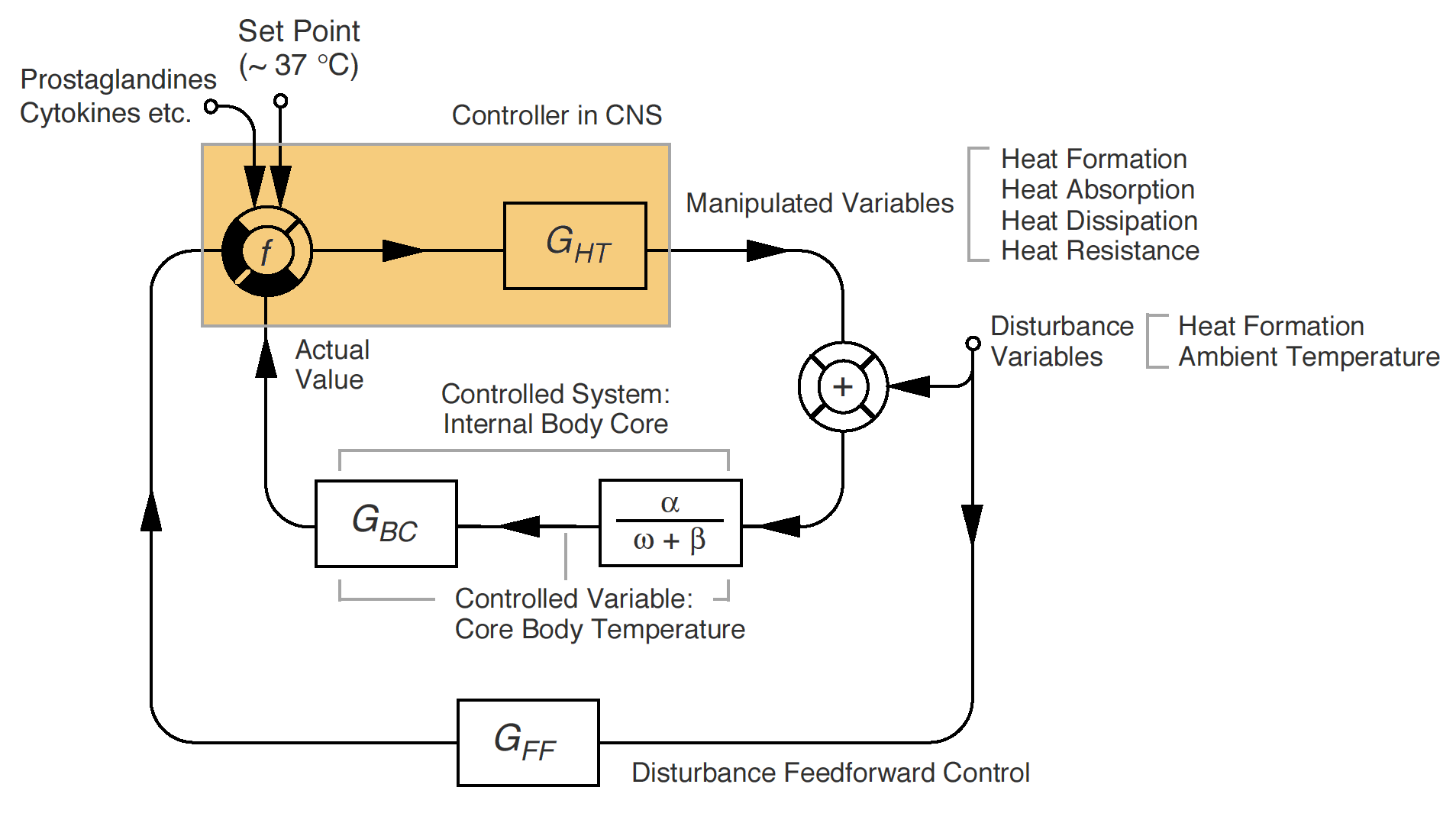
Simplified control circuit of human thermoregulation.

As in other mammals, thermoregulation is an important aspect of human homeostasis. Most body heat is generated in the deep organs, especially the liver, brain, and heart, and in contraction of skeletal muscles. Humans have been able to adapt to a great diversity of climates, including hot humid and hot arid. High temperatures pose serious stresses for the human body, placing it in great danger of injury or even death. For example, one of the most common reactions to hot temperatures is heat exhaustion, which is an illness that could happen if one is exposed to high temperatures, resulting in symptoms such as dizziness, fainting, or a rapid heartbeat. For humans, adaptation to varying climatic conditions includes both physiological mechanisms resulting from evolution and behavioural mechanisms resulting from conscious cultural adaptations. The physiological control of the body's core temperature takes place primarily through the hypothalamus, which assumes the role of the body's "thermostat". This organ possesses control mechanisms as well as key temperature sensors, which are connected to nerve cells called thermoreceptors. Thermoreceptors come in two subcategories; ones that respond to cold temperatures and ones that respond to warm temperatures. Scattered throughout the body in both the peripheral and central nervous systems, these nerve cells are sensitive to changes in temperature and are able to provide useful information to the hypothalamus through the process of negative feedback, thus maintaining a constant core temperature.

A dog panting after exercise

There are four avenues of heat loss: evaporation, convection, conduction, and radiation. If skin temperature is greater than that of the surrounding air temperature, the body can lose heat by convection and conduction. However, if the air temperature of the surroundings is greater than that of the skin, the body gains heat by convection and conduction. In such conditions, the only means by which the body can rid itself of heat is by evaporation. So, when the surrounding temperature is higher than the skin temperature, anything that prevents adequate evaporation will cause the internal body temperature to rise. During intense physical activity (e.g. sports), evaporation becomes the main avenue of heat loss. Humidity affects thermoregulation by limiting sweat evaporation and thus heat loss.

=== In reptiles ===
Thermoregulation is also an integral part of a reptile's life, specifically lizards such as Microlophus occipitalis and Ctenophorus decresii, who must change microhabitats to keep a consistent body temperature. By moving to cooler areas when it is too hot and to warmer areas when it is cold, they can thermoregulate their temperature to stay within their necessary bounds.

== In plants ==
Thermogenesis occurs in the flowers of many plants in the family Araceae as well as in cycad cones. In addition, the sacred lotus (Nelumbo nucifera) can thermoregulate itself, remaining on average 20 °C (36 °F) above air temperature while flowering. Heat is produced by breaking down the starch that was stored in their roots, which requires the consumption of oxygen at a rate approaching that of a flying hummingbird.

One possible explanation for plant thermoregulation is to provide protection against cold temperatures. For example, the skunk cabbage is not frost-resistant, yet it begins to grow and flower when there is still snow on the ground. Another theory is that thermogenicity helps attract pollinators, which is borne out by observations that heat production is accompanied by the arrival of beetles or flies.

Some plants are known to protect themselves against colder temperatures using antifreeze proteins. This occurs in wheat (Triticum aestivum), potatoes (Solanum tuberosum) and several other angiosperm species.

== Behavioral temperature regulation ==
Animals other than humans regulate and maintain their body temperature with physiological adjustments and behavior. Desert lizards are ectotherms and therefore are unable to regulate their internal temperature themselves. To regulate their internal temperature, many lizards relocate themselves to a more environmentally favorable location. They may do this in the morning only by raising their head from their burrow and then exposing their entire body. By basking in the sun, the lizard absorbs solar heat. It may also absorb heat by conduction from heated rocks that have stored radiant solar energy. To lower their temperature, lizards exhibit varied behaviors. Sand seas, or ergs, produce up to 57.7 °C (135.9 °F), and the sand lizard will hold its feet up in the air to cool down, seek cooler objects with which to contact, find shade, or return to its burrow. They also go to their burrows to avoid cooling when the temperature falls. Aquatic animals can also regulate their temperature behaviorally by changing their position in the thermal gradient. Sprawling prone in a cool shady spot, "splooting" has been observed in squirrels on hot days.

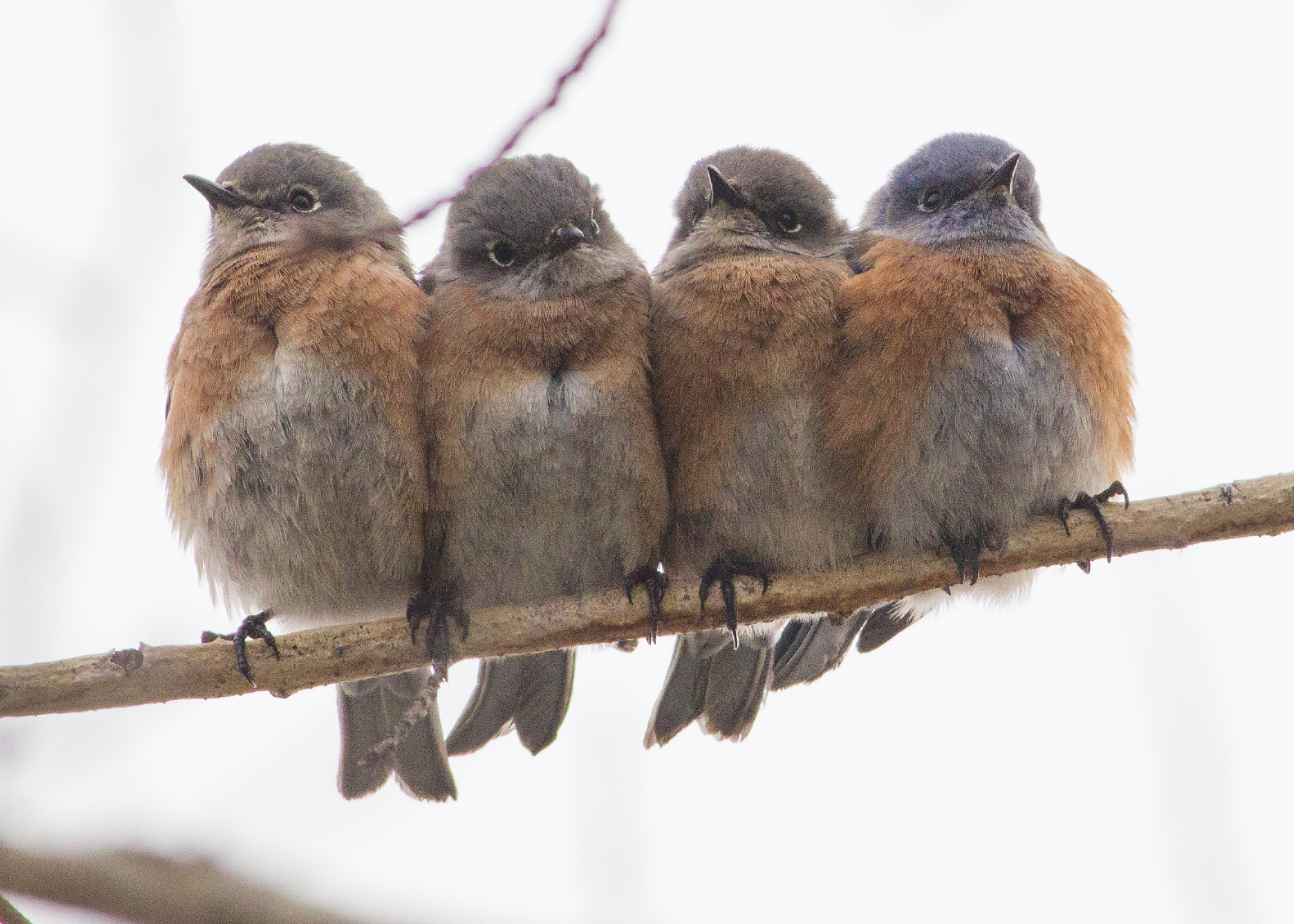
During cold weather, many animals increase their thermal inertia by huddling.

Animals also engage in kleptothermy in which they share or steal each other's body warmth. Kleptothermy is observed, particularly amongst juveniles, in endotherms such as bats and birds (such as the mousebird and emperor penguin). This allows the individuals to increase their thermal inertia (as with gigantothermy) and so reduce heat loss. Some ectotherms share burrows of ectotherms. Other animals exploit termite mounds.

Some animals living in cold environments maintain their body temperature by preventing heat loss. Their fur grows more densely to increase the amount of insulation. Some animals are regionally heterothermic and are able to allow their less insulated extremities to cool to temperatures much lower than their core temperature—nearly to 0 °C (32 °F). This minimizes heat loss through less insulated body parts, like the legs, feet (or hooves), and nose.

Different species of Drosophila found in the Sonoran Desert will exploit different species of cacti based on the thermotolerance differences between species and hosts. For example, Drosophila mettleri is found in cacti like the saguaro and senita; these two cacti remain cool by storing water. Over time, the genes selecting for higher heat tolerance were reduced in the population due to the cooler host climate the fly is able to exploit.

Some flies, such as Lucilia sericata, lay their eggs en masse. The resulting group of larvae, depending on its size, is able to thermoregulate and keep itself at the optimum temperature for development.

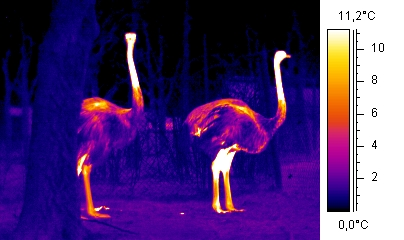
An ostrich can keep its body temperature relatively constant, even though the environment can be very hot during the day and cold at night.

Koalas also behaviorally thermoregulate by seeking out cooler portions of trees on hot days. They preferentially wrap themselves around the coolest portions of trees, typically near the bottom, to increase their passive radiation of internal body heat.

=== Hibernation, estivation and daily torpor ===
To cope with limited food resources and low temperatures, some mammals hibernate during cold periods. To remain in "stasis" for long periods, these animals build up brown fat reserves and slow all body functions. True hibernators (e.g., groundhogs) keep their body temperatures low throughout hibernation, whereas the core temperature of false hibernators (e.g., bears) varies; occasionally the animal may emerge from its den for brief periods. Some bats are true hibernators and rely upon a rapid, non-shivering thermogenesis of their brown fat deposit to bring them out of hibernation.

Estivation is similar to hibernation; however, it usually occurs in hot periods to allow animals to avoid high temperatures and desiccation. Both terrestrial and aquatic invertebrates and vertebrates enter into estivation. Examples include lady beetles (Coccinellidae), North American desert tortoises, crocodiles, salamanders, cane toads, and the water-holding frog.

Daily torpor occurs in small endotherms like bats and hummingbirds, which temporarily reduces their high metabolic rates to conserve energy.

== Variation in animals ==
Chart showing diurnal variation in body temperature.

=== Normal human temperature ===
Previously, average oral temperature for healthy adults had been considered 37.0 °C (98.6 °F), while normal ranges are 36.1 to 37.8 °C (97.0 to 100.0 °F). In China, Poland and Russia, the temperature had been measured axillarily (under the arm). 36.6 °C (97.9 °F) was considered "ideal" temperature in these countries, while normal ranges are 36.0 to 36.9 °C (96.8 to 98.4 °F).

Recent studies suggest that the average temperature for healthy adults is 36.8 °C (98.2 °F) (same result in three different studies). Variations (one standard deviation) from three other studies are:

- 36.4–37.1 °C (97.5–98.8 °F)
- 36.3–37.1 °C (97.3–98.8 °F) for males,
  36.5–37.3 °C (97.7–99.1 °F) for females
- 36.6–37.3 °C (97.9–99.1 °F)

Measured temperature varies according to thermometer placement, with rectal temperature being 0.3–0.6 °C (0.5–1.1 °F) higher than oral temperature, while axillary temperature is 0.3–0.6 °C (0.5–1.1 °F) lower than oral temperature. The average difference between oral and axillary temperatures of Indian children aged 6–12 was found to be only 0.1 °C (standard deviation 0.2 °C), and the mean difference in Maltese children aged 4–14 between oral and axillary temperature was 0.56 °C, while the mean difference between rectal and axillary temperature for children under 4 years old was 0.38 °C.

=== Variations due to circadian rhythms ===
In humans, a diurnal variation has been observed dependent on the periods of rest and activity, lowest at 11 p.m. to 3 a.m. and peaking at 10 a.m. to 6 p.m. Monkeys also have a well-marked and regular diurnal variation of body temperature that follows periods of rest and activity, and is not dependent on the incidence of day and night; nocturnal monkeys reach their highest body temperature at night and lowest during the day. Sutherland Simpson and J.J. Galbraith observed that all nocturnal animals and birds – whose periods of rest and activity are naturally reversed through habit and not from outside interference – experience their highest temperature during the natural period of activity (night) and lowest during the period of rest (day). Those diurnal temperatures can be reversed by reversing their daily routine.

In essence, the temperature curve of diurnal birds is similar to that of humans and other homeothermic animals, except that the maximum occurs earlier in the afternoon and the minimum earlier in the morning. Also, the curves obtained from rabbits, guinea pigs, and dogs were quite similar to those from humans. These observations indicate that body temperature is partially regulated by circadian rhythms.

=== Variations due to human menstrual cycles ===
During the follicular phase (which lasts from the first day of menstruation until the day of ovulation), the average basal body temperature in women ranges from 36.45 to 36.7 °C (97.61 to 98.06 °F). Within 24 hours of ovulation, women experience an elevation of 0.15–0.45 °C (0.27–0.81 °F) due to the increased metabolic rate caused by sharply elevated levels of progesterone. The basal body temperature ranges between 36.7–37.3 °C (98.1–99.1 °F) throughout the luteal phase, and drops down to pre-ovulatory levels within a few days of menstruation. Women can chart this phenomenon to determine whether and when they are ovulating, so as to aid conception or contraception.

=== Variations due to fever ===
Fever is a regulated elevation of the set point of core temperature in the hypothalamus, caused by circulating pyrogens produced by the immune system. To the subject, a rise in core temperature due to fever may result in feeling cold in an environment where people without fever do not. Fever and behavioural fever can enhance immune defence, however there are some caveats.

=== Variations due to biofeedback ===
Some monks are known to practice Tummo, biofeedback meditation techniques, that allow them to raise their body temperatures substantially.

== Effect on lifespan ==
The effects of such a genetic change in body temperature on longevity is difficult to study in humans.

== Limits compatible with life ==
There are limits both of heat and cold that an endothermic animal can bear and other far wider limits that an ectothermic animal may endure and yet live. The effect of too extreme a cold is to decrease metabolism and hence to lessen the production of heat. Both catabolic and anabolic pathways share in this metabolic depression, and, though less energy is used up, still less energy is generated. The effects of this diminished metabolism become telling on the central nervous system first, especially the brain and those parts concerning consciousness; both heart rate and respiration rate decrease; judgment becomes impaired as drowsiness supervenes, becoming steadily deeper until the individual loses consciousness; without medical intervention, death by hypothermia quickly follows. Occasionally, however, convulsions may set in towards the end, and death is caused by asphyxia.

In experiments on cats performed by Sutherland Simpson and Percy T. Herring, the animals were unable to survive when rectal temperature fell below 16 °C (61 °F). At this low temperature, respiration became increasingly feeble; heart-impulse usually continued after respiration had ceased, the beats becoming very irregular, appearing to cease, then beginning again. Death appeared to be mainly due to asphyxia, and the only certain sign that it had taken place was the loss of knee-jerks.

However, too high a temperature speeds up the metabolism of different tissues to such a rate that their metabolic capital is soon exhausted. Blood that is too warm produces dyspnea by exhausting the metabolic capital of the respiratory centre; heart rate is increased; the beats then become arrhythmic and eventually cease. The central nervous system is also profoundly affected by hyperthermia and delirium, and convulsions may set in. Consciousness may also be lost, propelling the person into a comatose condition. These changes can sometimes also be observed in patients experiencing an acute fever. Mammalian muscle becomes rigid with heat rigor at about 50 °C, with the sudden rigidity of the whole body rendering life impossible.

H.M. Vernon performed work on the death temperature and paralysis temperature (temperature of heat rigor) of various animals. He found that species of the same class showed very similar temperature values, those from the Amphibia examined being 38.5 °C, fish 39 °C, reptiles 45 °C, and various molluscs 46 °C. Also, in the case of pelagic animals, he showed a relation between death temperature and the quantity of solid constituents of the body. In higher animals, however, his experiments tend to show that there is greater variation in both the chemical and physical characteristics of the protoplasm and, hence, greater variation in the extreme temperatures compatible with life.

A 2022 study on the effect of heat on young people found that the critical wet-bulb temperature at which heat stress can no longer be compensated, T_{wb,crit}, in young, healthy adults performing tasks at modest metabolic rates mimicking basic activities of daily life was much lower than the 35 °C usually assumed, at about 30.55 °C in 36–40 °C humid environments, but progressively decreased in hotter, dry ambient environments.

=== Arthropoda ===
The maximum temperatures tolerated by certain thermophilic arthropods exceeds the lethal temperatures for most vertebrates.

The most heat-resistant insects are three genera of desert ants recorded from three different parts of the world. The ants have developed a lifestyle of scavenging for short durations during the hottest hours of the day, in excess of 50 °C (122 °F), for the carcasses of insects and other forms of life which have died from heat stress.

In April 2014, the South Californian mite Paratarsotomus macropalpis has been recorded as the world's fastest land animal relative to body length, at a speed of 322 body lengths per second. Besides the unusually high speed of the mites, the researchers were surprised to find them running at such speeds on concrete at temperatures up to 60 °C (140 °F), which is significant because this temperature is well above the lethal limit for most animal species. In addition, the mites are able to stop and change direction very quickly.

Spiders like Nephila pilipes exhibit active thermal regulation behavior. During high-temperature sunny days, it aligns its body with the direction of sunlight to reduce the body area under direct sunlight.

== See also ==
- Human body temperature
- Innate heat
- Insect thermoregulation
- Thermal neutral zone
