= Polyphyly =

Property of a group not united by common ancestry

In this phylogenetic tree, the monophyletic blue and red groups do not share an immediate common ancestor, as the former more recently emerged from the green group. The more distantly related blue and red groups may thus be categorized as polyphyletic based on shared traits.

Cladogram of the primates, showing a monophyly (the simians, in yellow), a paraphyly (the prosimians, in cyan, including the red patch), and a polyphyly (the night-active primates, the lorises and the tarsiers, in red).

Phylogenetic groups: A monophyletic taxon (in yellow, the clade Sauropsida grouping "reptiles and birds") contains a common ancestor and all of its descendants. A paraphyletic taxon (in cyan, the "reptiles") contains its most recent common ancestor, but does not contain all the descendants of that ancestor. A polyphyletic taxon (in red, the group Haemothermia containing warm-blooded tetrapods) does not contain the most recent common ancestor of all its members.

A polyphyletic group is an assemblage that includes organisms with mixed evolutionary origin but does not include their most recent common ancestor. The term is often applied to groups that share similar features known as homoplasies, which are explained as a result of convergent evolution. It is contrasted with monophyly and paraphyly.

Although polyphyly may be convenient for grouping hybrids and some species, many taxonomists prefer to avoid homoplasies in grouping taxa, preferring their monophyletic organization.

== Overview ==
A polyphyletic group is an assemblage that includes organisms with mixed evolutionary origin but does not include their most recent common ancestor. The term is often applied to groups that share similar features known as homoplasies, which are explained as a result of convergent evolution. The arrangement of the members of a polyphyletic group is called a polyphyly /ˈpɒlɪˌfaɪli/.

For example, the biological characteristic of warm-bloodedness evolved separately in the ancestors of mammals and the ancestors of birds; "warm-blooded animals" is therefore a polyphyletic grouping. Other examples of polyphyletic groups are slime molds, worms, algae, trees, C4 photosynthetic plants, and edentates.

Species have a special status in systematics as being an observable feature of nature itself and as the basic unit of classification. It is usually implicitly assumed that species are monophyletic (or at least paraphyletic). However, hybrid speciation arguably leads to polyphyletic species. Hybrid species are a common phenomenon in nature, particularly in plants where polyploidy allows for rapid speciation. Some cladist authors do not consider species to possess the property of "-phyly", which they assert applies only to groups of species.

Researchers concerned more with ecology than with systematics may consider polyphyletic groups as legitimate; the similarities in activity within the fungus group Alternaria, for example, can lead researchers to regard the group as a valid genus while acknowledging its polyphyly. In recent research, the concepts of monophyly, paraphyly, and polyphyly have been used in deducing key genes for barcoding of diverse groups of species.

== Etymology ==
The term polyphyly, or polyphyletic, derives from the two Ancient Greek words πολύς (polús) 'many, a lot of', and φῦλον (phûlon) 'genus, species', and refers to the fact that a polyphyletic group includes organisms (e.g., genera, species) arising from multiple ancestral sources.

Conversely, the term monophyly, or monophyletic, employs the ancient Greek adjective μόνος (mónos) 'alone, only, unique', and refers to the fact that a monophyletic group includes organisms consisting of all the descendants of a unique common ancestor.

By comparison, the term paraphyly, or paraphyletic, uses the ancient Greek preposition παρά (pará) 'beside, near', and refers to the situation in which one or several monophyletic subgroups are left apart from all other descendants of a unique common ancestor.

== Avoidance ==
In many schools of taxonomy, the recognition of polyphyletic groups in a classification is discouraged. The identification and elimination of groups found to be polyphyletic is often the stimulus for major revisions of classification schemes.

Monophyletic groups (that is, clades) are considered by these schools of thought to be the only valid groupings of organisms because they are diagnosed ("defined", in common parlance) on the basis of synapomorphies, while paraphyletic or polyphyletic groups are not. From the perspective of ancestry, clades are simple to define in purely phylogenetic terms without reference to clades previously introduced: a node-based clade definition, for example, could be "All descendants of the last common ancestor of species X and Y". On the other hand, polyphyletic groups can be delimited as a conjunction of several clades, for example "the flying vertebrates consist of the bat, bird, and pterosaur clades".

From a practical perspective, grouping species monophyletically facilitates prediction far more than does polyphyletic grouping. For example, classifying a newly discovered grass in the monophyletic family Poaceae, the true grasses, immediately results in numerous predictions about its structure and its developmental and reproductive characteristics, that are synapomorphies of this family. In contrast, Carl Linnaeus' assignment of plants with two stamens to the polyphyletic class Diandria, while practical for identification, turns out to be useless for prediction, since the presence of exactly two stamens has developed convergently in many groups.

== See also ==
- Carcinisation

== Bibliography ==
- Tudge, Colin (2000). The Variety of Life. Oxford University Press. ISBN 0-19-860426-2.
- "Evolution - A-Z - Polyphyletic group". www.blackwellpublishing.com.
