= Insect thermoregulation =

Insect body temperature regulation

The pre-flight warm-up behavior of a moth

Insect thermoregulation is the process whereby insects maintain body temperatures within certain boundaries. Insects have traditionally been considered as poikilotherms (animals in which body temperature is variable and dependent on ambient temperature) as opposed to being homeothermic (animals that maintain a stable internal body temperature regardless of external influences). However, the term temperature regulation, or thermoregulation, is currently used to describe the ability of insects and other animals to maintain a stable temperature (either above or below ambient temperature), at least in a portion of their bodies by physiological or behavioral means. While many insects are ectotherms (animals in which their heat source is primarily from the environment), others are endotherms (animals that can produce heat internally by biochemical processes). These endothermic insects are better described as regional heterotherms because they are not uniformly endothermic. When heat is being produced, different temperatures are maintained in different parts of their bodies, for example, moths generate heat in their thorax prior to flight but the abdomen remains relatively cool.

== In-flight thermoregulation ==
Animal flight is a very energetically expensive form of locomotion that requires a high metabolic rate. In order for an animal to fly, its flight muscles need to be capable of high mechanical power output, which in turn, due to biochemical inefficiencies, end up producing large amounts of heat. A flying insect produces heat, which, as long as it does not exceed an upper lethal limit, will be tolerated. However, if the flying insect is also exposed to external sources of heat (for example, radiation from the sun) or ambient temperatures are too high, it should be able to thermoregulate and stay in its temperature comfort zone. Higher speeds necessarily increase convective cooling. Higher flying velocities have been shown to result in an increase, instead of a reduction, of thoracic temperature. This is probably caused by the flight muscles working at higher levels and consequently, increasing thoracic heat generation. The first evidence for insect thermoregulation in flight came from experiments in moths demonstrating that dissipation of heat occurs via hemolymph movement from the thorax to the abdomen. The heart of these moths makes a loop through the center of the thorax facilitating heat exchange and converting the abdomen into both a heat sink and a heat radiator that helps the flying insect in maintaining a stable thoracic temperature under different ambient temperature conditions. It was believed that heat regulation was only achieved by varying heat loss until evidence for varying heat production was observed in honeybees. Then, it was then suggested that thermal stability in honeybees, and probably many other heterothermic insects, was primarily attained by varying heat production. Whether flying insects are able or not to regulate their thoracic temperature by regulating heat production or only by varying heat loss, is still a matter of debate.

== Pre-flight thermoregulation ==
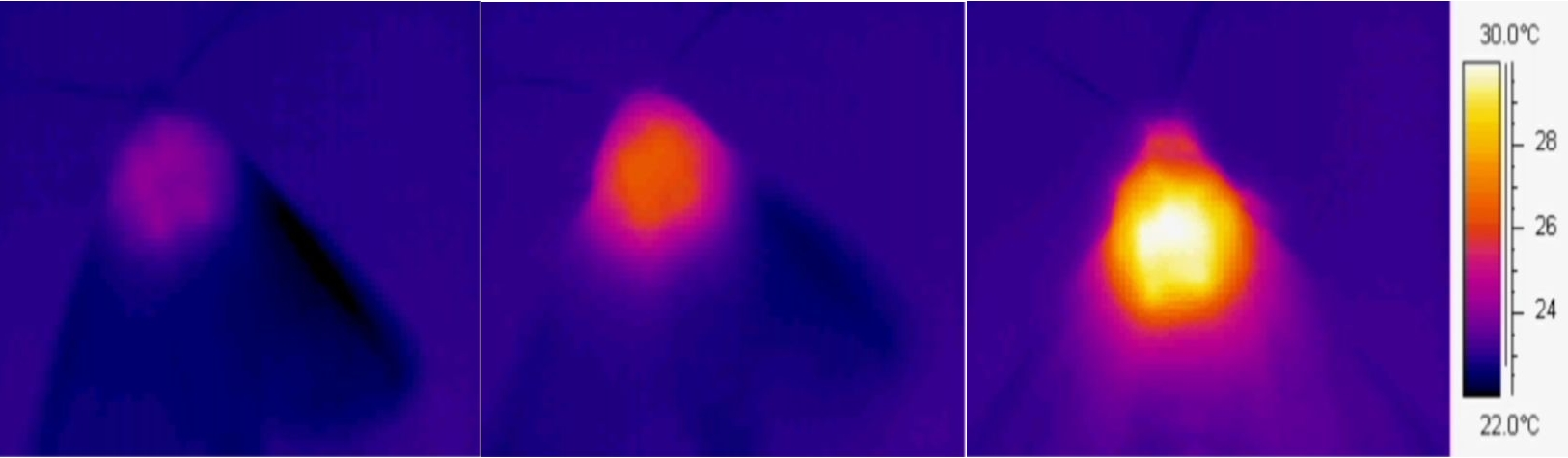
Thoracic temperature changes in a moth recorded with an infra-red camera

Several large insects have evolved to warm-up previous to flight so that energetically demanding activities, such as flight, are possible. Insect behavior involves inefficient muscle operation that produces excess heat and establishes the thermal range in which specific muscles best function. The high metabolic cost of insect flight muscles means that great amounts of chemical energy are utilized by these specific muscles. However, only a very small percentage of this energy translates into actual mechanical work or wing movement. Thus, the rest of this chemical energy is transformed into heat that in turn produces body temperatures significantly greater than those of the ambient.

These high temperatures at which flight muscles work impose a constraint on low temperature take-off because an insect at rest has its flight muscles at ambient temperature, which is not the optimal temperature for these muscles to function. So, heterothermic insects have adapted to make use of the excess heat produced by flight muscles to increase their thoracic temperature pre-flight. Both the dorsolongitudinal muscles (which flip down the wings during flight) and the dorsoventral muscles (which cause the wings to flip upward during flight) are involved in the pre-flight warm-up behavior but in a slightly different way. During flight, these function as antagonistic muscles to produce the wing flapping that allows for sustained flight. However, during warm-up these muscles are contracted simultaneously (or almost simultaneously in some insects) to produce no wing movement (or a minimal amount of wing movement) and produce as much heat as possible to elevate thoracic temperatures to flight-levels. The pre-flight warm-up behavior of male moths (Helicoverpa zea) has been shown to be affected by olfactory information. As in many moths, the males of this species respond to female pheromone by flying towards the female and trying to mate with her. During the warm-up of their flight muscles, and when in presence of the female pheromone, males generate heat at higher rates, so as to take off earlier and out-compete other males that might have also sensed the pheromone.

Achieving elevated temperatures as stated above fall under the term physiological thermoregulation because heat is generated by a physiological process inside the insect. The other described way of thermoregulation is called behavioral thermoregulation because body temperature is controlled by behavioral means, such as basking in the sun. Butterflies are a good example of insects that are heliotherms (deriving heat almost exclusively from the sun).

== Other thermoregulatory examples ==
Some nocturnal dung beetles have been shown to increase their ball-making and ball-rolling velocity when their thoracic temperature increases. In these beetles, dung is a precious commodity that allows them to find a mate and feed their larvae. Discovering the resource soon is important so that they can start rolling a ball as soon as possible and take it to a distant place for burying. The beetles first detect the dung by olfactory cues and fly towards it rapidly. As they first arrive, their body temperatures are still high due to their flight metabolism, which allows them to make and roll balls faster; and the bigger the ball, the better chances they have of getting a mate. However, as time passes, a grounded beetle making a ball starts to cool off and it becomes harder to increase the size of the dung ball and also transport it. So, there is a trade-off between making a large ball that would guarantee a mate but might be not easily transported and a smaller ball, which might not attract a mate but can be safely taken to the burying place. Additionally, other beetles that arrive later (which are hotter), can actually fight over balls and have been shown to usually win against beetles that are cooler.

Another example of thermoregulation is that of heat being used as a defensive mechanism. The Japanese honeybee (Apis cerana japonica) is preyed upon by a hornet (Vespa simillima xanthoptera) that usually waits at the entrance of their hive. Even though the hornets are many times bigger than the bees, bees numbers make the difference. These bees are adapted to survive temperatures above 46 °C (115 °F) but the hornet is not. Thus, bees are able to kill their attacker by making a ball around the hornet and then increasing their body temperature above 46 °C (115 °F).

Anopheles mosquitoes, vectors of Malaria, thermoregulate each time they take a blood meal on a warm-blooded animal. During blood ingestion, they emit a droplet composed of urine and fresh blood that they keep attached to their anus. The liquid of the drop evaporates dissipating the excess of heat in their bodies consequence of the rapid ingestion of relatively high amounts of blood much warmer than the insect itself. This evaporative cooling mechanism helps them to avoid the thermal stress associated to their haematophagous way of life.

The Grayling butterfly (Hipparchia semele) engages in thermoregulation as well. The species prefers to live in open habitats with easy access to the sun, and can be seen orienting its body to maximize exposure to the sun. At lower temperatures, the grayling can be observed exposing as much of its body as possible to the sun, whereas at higher temperatures, it exposes as little of its body as possible. This behavior is often used by male butterflies defending their territory, as this thermoregulatory behavior allows them to maximize their flight efficiency.

The thermoregulatory properties of dark coloration are important for mate searching by Phymata americana males. In cool climates, darker coloration allows males to reach warmer temperatures faster, which increases locomotor ability and decreases mate search time.

== See also ==
- Thermoregulation
- Entomology
- Ethnoentomology
- Flying and gliding animals
