= Abdominal pigmentation in Drosophila melanogaster =

Genetic trait in Drosophila

Abdominal pigmentation in Drosophila melanogaster is a morphologically simple but highly variable trait that often has adaptive significance. Pigmentation has extensively been studied in Drosophila melanogaster. It has been used as a model for understanding the development and evolution of morphological phenotypes.

Pigmentation shows enormous phenotypic variation between species, populations, and individuals, and even within individuals during ontogeny. It gives rise to natural variation, polyphenism and sexual dimorphism. It also varies between species, contributing to species recognition, mate choice, thermoregulation, protection (warning signals), mimicry, and crypsis. Changes in pigmentation are often adaptive and vital to the fitness of the organism. Much is known about the genes that regulate the biochemical synthesis of pigments in D. melanogaster and the genes that control the temporal and spatial distribution of this biosynthesis.

Not only is body pigmentation ecologically relevant in Drosophila but it is also a relatively simple and easily measured phenotype to study the genetic architecture of natural variation in complex traits. Each tergite of female D. melanogaster generally has a stripe of dark coloration (melanin) on a lighter tan background (sclerotin). During pre-and post-ecdysis, the epidermal cells underlying the cuticle secrete tyrosine-derived catecholamines into the cuticle for sclerotization and melanisation.

The melanin/sclerotin biosynthetic pathway and its underlying genetic basis have been well studied. However, many of the genes known to affect D. melanogaster pigmentation do not form part of this pathway or any parallel pathway. Furthermore, the genes that lead to natural variation in body pigmentation are not necessarily the same genes that are directly involved in the biosynthesis of melanin and sclerotin. By mapping the genetic basis of natural variation in body pigmentation, new genes affecting pigment biosynthesis as well as regulatory regions that determine when and where pigmentation will develop were discovered.

== The yellow gene ==
The yellow gene is required for the production of black melanin and in the absence of yellow, black melanin is replaced by brown melanin. In Drosophila melanogaster, yellow is sex-specifically regulated in the posterior abdomen. Furthermore, the evolution of wing or abdominal pigmentation patterns between Drosophila species correlates with modifications of yellow spatial expression. Temperature also controls the spatial expression of yellow in the abdominal epidermis of pharate females.

By contrast, yellow expression associated with bristles is not modulated by temperature. yellow is known to be required but not sufficient for black melanin production. Studies have indicated that the black melanin is Dopamine-melanin and not Dopa-melanin. The combined over-expression of yellow and tan at 29 °C is necessary and sufficient to reproduce the black phenotype observed at 18°C. Thus, the stronger expression of yellow at 18°C also contributes to thermal plasticity of female abdominal pigmentation.

yellow is required but not sufficient for production of black pigment. Indeed, yellow gain- of-function must be combined to ebony down-regulation or tan up-regulation to induce a fully black pigmentation. In order to test whether the strong expression of yellow and tan is sufficient to explain the black pigmentation observed at 18 °C, the researcher increased their expression in abdominal epidermis at 29 °C to mimic the effect of lower temperature.

On comparing the cuticles of wild-type females and females over-expressing either yellow (pnr-Gal4/UAS-y), tan (UAS-t/+; pnr-Gal4/+) or both yellow and tan (UAS-t/+; UAS-y/pnr-Gal4) at 29 °C. The yellow over-expression does not change pigmentation whereas tan over-expression induces dark pigmentation in the anterior region of the tergites. However, careful examination revealed that this ectopic pigmentation was not as dark as the normal pigmentation in the posterior region of the tergites. This was more visible in A4 and A5 segments. By contrast, when both yellow and tan were over-expressed in the dorsal region of the abdomen, the anterior region of the tergites was as black as the posterior border of the tergites. This shows that yellow and tan combined over-expression at 29 °C is necessary and sufficient to reproduce the pigmentation phenotype observed at low temperature.

== Production of dopamine-melanin by the yellow gene ==
Yellow gene is required for the production of Dopamine-melanin. Yellow is related to two other enzymes, Yellow-f and Yellow-f2, which can be used as substrate for Dopachrome with a higher efficiency than Dopamine-chrome. Some authors have proposed that the black pigment in abdominal cuticle was Dopa-melanin produced from Dopa. Incubation of abdominal cuticles or wings of unpigmented pharates with Dopamine is sufficient to produce black pigment, which suggests that this black pigment is produced from Dopamine and is therefore Dopamine-melanin. It is also known that Ddc down-regulation leads to a complete loss of black and brown pigments.

== Effect of temperature ==
Abdominal pigmentation in Drosophilids represents an appropriate model to dissect the molecular bases of phenotypic plasticity as it is sensitive to temperature in many species. Abdominal pigmentation of Drosophila melanogaster females is darker when they develop at low temperature. This is particularly pronounced in posterior abdominal segment. Plasticity of abdominal pigmentation is likely to have functional consequences as abdominal pigmentation has been linked to thermoregulation and resistance to UV, pathogens or parasites. Abdominal pigmentation is also associated to resistance to desiccation.

Abdominal pigmentation differs between males and females in several Drosophila species and has been used as a model to dissect the genetic bases of sexual dimorphism. Furthermore, as abdominal pigmentation is highly evolvable, it has been investigated to study the molecular bases of morphological variation within species. The genes involved in Drosophila abdominal pigmentation are relatively well known, in particular those encoding the enzymes required for the synthesis of cuticle pigments. It has been reported recently that the thermal plasticity of female abdominal pigmentation in Drosophila melanogaster involves transcriptional modulation of the pigmentation gene tan (t). This gene encodes a hydrolase implicated in the production of melanin. tan is seven times more expressed at 18 °C than at 29 °C in the posterior abdominal epidermis of young adult females.

=== Temperature modulation ===
It is shown by RT-qPCR that yellow expression is modulated by temperature in the epidermis of abdominal segments A5, A6 and A7 in female pharates (1.97 fold more expressed at 18 °C than at 29 °C). In order to analyse the spatial expression of y, many researchers performed in-situ hybridization of female pharates grown at 18 °C or 29 °C and could distinguish three stages of yellow expression (A, B and C) based on the degree of maturation of abdominal bristles . These stages correspond approximately to a transition from stage P11(i) to stage P12(ii) as described by Bainbridge and Bownes with morphological markers at 25 °C.

In stage A pharates, two cells at the base of bristles expressed y. This expression had a similar intensity when pharates were raised at 18 °C and at 29 °C. These two cells are likely to be the socket and the shaft, the only pigmented cells of the bristle organ. In addition, yellow was expressed in the posterior region of each tergite in segments A2 to A6. This expression was much broader and stronger in pharates grown at 18 °C compared to 29 °C. In A6, yellow was expressed in the whole tergite at 18 °C, and only in the posterior region of the tergite at 29 °C. In A7, at 18 °C, the whole tergite expressed yellow at a high level, whereas it was much weaker at 29 °C.

In stage B pharates, yellow expression was reduced in the socket and the shaft, while the bristle began to be pigmented. Furthermore, yellow was still more expressed in the abdominal epidermis of pharates grown at 18 °C than at 29 °C.

In stage C pharates, yellow was no longer expressed at the base of bristles and the bristles were almost fully pigmented. Furthermore, its overall expression in tergites was reduced compared to stage B and more similar between pharates grown at 18 °C and 29 °C.

== Regulation of pigmentation ==
Hox genes have been implicated in the evolution of many animal body patterns. Hox protein directly activates expression of the yellow pigmentation gene in posterior segments. In D. melanogaster, the male has fully pigmented tergites in the fifth and sixth abdominal segments (A5 and A6), whereas the female's tergites have only a narrow pigment stripe. This sexually dimorphic pigmentation pattern is controlled by a genetic regulatory circuit involving the Hox gene Abd-B. Loss-of-function mutations of Abd-B cause the loss of male-specific pigmentation, while gain-of-function alleles, such as Abd-BMcp, cause the expansion of pigmentation to the A4 segment or even to the thorax. The sexually dimorphic pigment pattern depends upon regulatory interactions among the Abd-B, bab, and dsx genes.

Pigmentation of the posterior male abdomen is a trait found in many members of the melanogaster species group but not in several other major groups. The dimorphic regulation of bab expression is closely correlated with dimorphic pigmentation as well other pigmentation patterns. It is not known, however, which regulatory interactions among Abd-B, bab, dsx, and pigmentation genes are direct and which are indirect.
