= Monophyly =

Taxonomic concept

A phylogenetic tree: both blue and red groups are monophyletic. The green group is paraphyletic: it is missing a monophyletic subgroup – the blue group – that shares a common ancestor with itself. In this form, monophyletic means "no sideways stems leaving the group".

A cladogram of the primates, showing a monophyletic taxon: the simians (in yellow); a paraphyletic taxon: the prosimians (in cyan, including the red patch); and a polyphyletic group: the night-active primates, i.e., the lorises and the tarsiers (in red).

A cladogram of the vertebrates showing phylogenetic groups. A monophyletic taxon (in yellow): the group of "reptiles and birds", contains its most recent common ancestor and all descendants of that ancestor. A paraphyletic taxon (in cyan): the group of reptiles, contains its most recent common ancestor, but does not contain all the descendants (namely Aves) of that ancestor. A polyphyletic "group" (in red): the group of all warm-blooded amniotes (Aves and Mammalia), does not contain the most recent common ancestor of all its members; this group is not seen as a taxonomic unit and is not considered a taxon by modern systematists.

In biological cladistics for the classification of organisms, monophyly is the condition of a taxonomic grouping being a clade – that is, a grouping of organisms which meets these criteria:

1. the grouping contains its own most recent common ancestor (or more precisely an ancestral population), i.e. excludes non-descendants of that common ancestor
2. the grouping contains all the descendants of that common ancestor, without exception

Monophyly is contrasted with paraphyly and polyphyly as shown in the second diagram. A paraphyletic grouping meets 1. but not 2., thus consisting of the descendants of a common ancestor, excepting one or more monophyletic subgroups. A polyphyletic grouping meets neither criterion, and instead serves to characterize convergent relationships of biological features rather than genetic relationships – for example, night-active primates, fruit trees, or aquatic insects. As such, these characteristic features of a polyphyletic grouping are not inherited from a common ancestor, but evolved independently.

Monophyletic groups are typically characterised by shared derived characteristics (synapomorphies), which distinguish organisms in the clade from other organisms. An equivalent term is holophyly.

The word "mono-phyly" means "one-tribe" in Greek.

These definitions have taken some time to be accepted. When the cladistics school of thought became mainstream in the 1960s, several alternative definitions were in use. Indeed, taxonomists sometimes used terms without defining them, leading to confusion in the early literature, a confusion which persists.

The first diagram shows a phylogenetic tree with two monophyletic groups. The several groups and subgroups are particularly situated as branches of the tree to indicate ordered lineal relationships between all the organisms shown. Further, any group may (or may not) be considered a taxon by modern systematics, depending upon the selection of its members in relation to their common ancestor(s); see second and third diagrams.

== Etymology ==
The term monophyly, or monophyletic, derives from the two Ancient Greek words μόνος (mónos), meaning "alone, only, unique", and φῦλον (phûlon), meaning "genus, species", and refers to the fact that a monophyletic group includes organisms (e.g., genera, species) consisting of all the descendants of a unique common ancestor.

Conversely, the term polyphyly, or polyphyletic, builds on the ancient Greek prefix πολύς (polús), meaning "many, a lot of", and refers to the fact that a polyphyletic group includes organisms arising from multiple ancestral sources.

By comparison, the term paraphyly, or paraphyletic, uses the ancient Greek prefix παρά (pará), meaning "beside, near", and refers to the situation in which one or several monophyletic subgroups are left apart from all other descendants of a unique common ancestor. That is, a paraphyletic group is nearly monophyletic, hence the prefix pará.

== Definitions ==
On the broadest scale, definitions fall into two groups.

- Willi Hennig (1966:148) defined monophyly as groups based on synapomorphy (in contrast to paraphyletic groups, based on symplesiomorphy, and polyphyletic groups, based on convergence). Some authors have sought to define monophyly to include paraphyly as any two or more groups sharing a common ancestor. However, this broader definition encompasses both monophyletic and paraphyletic groups as defined above. Therefore, most scientists today restrict the term "monophyletic" to refer to groups consisting of all the descendants of one (hypothetical) common ancestor. However, when considering taxonomic groups such as genera and species, the most appropriate nature of their common ancestor is rather a population. Assuming that it would be one individual or mating pair is unrealistic for sexually reproducing species, which are by definition interbreeding populations.
- Monophyly (or holophyly) and associated terms are restricted to discussions of taxa, and are not necessarily accurate when used to describe what Hennig called tokogenetic relationships – now referred to as genealogies. Some argue that using a broader definition, such as a species and all its descendants, does not really work to define a genus. The loose definition also fails to recognize the relations of all organisms. According to D. M. Stamos, a satisfactory cladistic definition of a species or genus is impossible because many species (and even genera) may form by "budding" from an existing species, leaving the parent species paraphyletic; or the species or genera may be the result of hybrid speciation.

The concepts of monophyly, paraphyly, and polyphyly have been used in deducing key genes for barcoding of diverse group of species.

== See also ==
- Clade
- Crown group
- Glossary of scientific naming
- Monotypic taxon
- Paraphyly
- Polyphyly
