= Warm-blooded =

Animal species that can maintain a body temperature higher than their environment

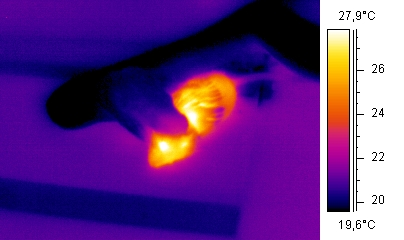
Thermographic image: a cold-blooded snake is shown eating a warm-blooded mouse

Warm-blooded is a term referring to animal species whose bodies maintain a temperature higher than that of their environment. In particular, homeothermic species (including birds and mammals) maintain a stable body temperature by regulating metabolic processes. Other species have various degrees of thermoregulation.

Because there are more than two categories of temperature control utilized by animals, the terms warm-blooded and cold-blooded have been deprecated in the scientific field.

== Terminology ==
In general, warm-bloodedness refers to various separate categories of thermoregulation.

- Endothermy (Note: Greek: ἔνδον endon "within" θέρμη thermē "heat") is the ability of some creatures to control their body temperatures through internal means such as muscle shivering or increasing their metabolism. The opposite of endothermy is ectothermy.
- Homeothermy (Note: Greek: ὅμοιος homoios "similar", θέρμη thermē "heat") maintains a stable internal body temperature regardless of external influence and temperatures. The stable internal temperature is often higher than the immediate environment. The opposite is poikilothermy. The only known living homeotherms are mammals and birds, as well as one lizard, the Argentine black and white tegu. Some non-avian dinosaurs as well as some extinct reptiles such as ichthyosaurs, pterosaurs, plesiosaurs are believed to have been homeotherms.
- Heterothermy describes creatures which vary between self-regulating their body temperature, and allowing the surrounding environment to affect it. In other words, they exhibit characteristics of both poikilothermy and homeothermy.
- Mesothermy is a thermoregulatory strategy intermediate to cold-blooded ectotherms and warm-blooded endotherms.
- Tachymetabolism (Note: Greek: ταχύς tachys or tachus "fast, swift", μεταβάλλειν metaballein "turn quickly") is an elevated metabolic rate when compared to other animals of the same body mass and tissue temperature. In essence, tachymetabolic creatures are "on" all the time. Though their resting metabolism is still many times slower than their active metabolism, the difference is often not as large as that seen in bradymetabolic creatures. Tachymetabolic creatures have greater difficulty dealing with a scarcity of food. It is sometimes used as a synonym for "warm-blooded".

== Varieties of thermoregulation ==
A significant proportion of creatures commonly referred to as "warm-blooded," like birds and mammals, exhibit all three of these categories (i.e., they are endothermic, homeothermic, and tachymetabolic). However, over the past three decades, investigations in the field of animal thermophysiology have unveiled numerous species within these two groups that do not meet all these criteria. For instance, many bats and small birds become poikilothermic and bradymetabolic during sleep (or, in nocturnal species, during the day). For such creatures, the term heterothermy was introduced.

Further examinations of animals traditionally classified as cold-blooded have revealed that most creatures manifest varying combinations of the three aforementioned terms, along with their counterparts (ectothermy, poikilothermy, and bradymetabolism), thus creating a broad spectrum of body temperature types. Some fish have warm-blooded characteristics, such as the opah. Swordfish and some sharks have circulatory mechanisms that keep their brains and eyes above ambient temperatures and thus increase their ability to detect and react to prey. Tunas and some sharks have similar mechanisms in their muscles, improving their stamina when swimming at high speed.

== Heat generation ==
Body heat is generated by metabolism. This relates to the chemical reaction in cells that break down glucose into water and carbon dioxide, thereby producing adenosine triphosphate (ATP), a high-energy compound used to power other cellular processes. Muscle contraction is one such metabolic process generating heat energy, and additional heat results from friction as blood circulates through the vascular system in premise to their specialized fat cells which produce heat through uncoupled respiration, contributing to thermoregulation.

All organisms metabolize food and other inputs, but some make better use of the output than others. Like all energy conversions, metabolism is rather inefficient, and around 60% of the available energy is converted to heat rather than to ATP. In most organisms, this heat dissipates into the surroundings. However, endothermic homeotherms (generally referred to as "warm-blooded" animals) not only produce more heat but also possess superior means of retaining and regulating it compared to other animals. They exhibit a higher basal metabolic rate and can further increase their metabolic rate during strenuous activity. They usually have well-developed insulation in order to retain body heat: fur and blubber in the case of mammals and feathers in birds. When this insulation is insufficient to maintain body temperature, they may resort to shivering—rapid muscle contractions that quickly use up ATP, thus stimulating cellular metabolism to replace it and consequently produce more heat. Additionally, almost all eutherian mammals (with the only known exception being swine) have brown adipose tissue whose mitochondria are capable of non-shivering thermogenesis. This process involves the direct dissipation of the mitochondrial gradient as heat via an uncoupling protein, thereby "uncoupling" the gradient from its usual function of driving ATP production via ATP synthase.

In warm environments, these animals employ evaporative cooling to shed excess heat, either through sweating (some mammals) or by panting (many mammals and all birds)—mechanisms generally absent in poikilotherms.

== Defense against fungi ==
It has been hypothesized that warm-bloodedness evolved in mammals and birds as a defense against fungal infections. Very few fungi can survive the body temperatures of warm-blooded animals. By comparison, insects, reptiles, and amphibians are plagued by fungal infections. Warm-blooded animals have a defense against pathogens contracted from the environment, since environmental pathogens are not adapted to their higher internal temperature.

== See also ==
- Argentine black and white tegu § Endothermic behavior
- Palaeophis#biology
- Gigantothermy
- Mesotherm
- Thermogenic plant
