= Psoloessa delicatula =

Scientific classification
- Domain: Eukaryota
- Kingdom: Animalia
- Phylum: Arthropoda
- Class: Insecta
- Order: Orthoptera
- Suborder: Caelifera
- Family: Acrididae
- Subfamily: Gomphocerinae
- Genus: Psoloessa
- Species: P. delicatula

Binomial name
- Psoloessa delicatula (Scudder, 1876)

Species of grasshopper

Psoloessa delicatula, the brown-spotted range grasshopper, is a species of slant-faced grasshopper in the family Acrididae. It is found in North America. This grasshopper exhibits postures specifically as a means of thermoregulation, lowering its abdomen towards the ground and moving its hind legs away from its body, and at temperatures above 32 degrees Celsius, will deliberately seek out shade.
