= Exotherm =

Exotherm may refer to:

- Cold-blooded organism
- Exothermic process
