= Psoloessa =

Scientific classification
- Domain: Eukaryota
- Kingdom: Animalia
- Phylum: Arthropoda
- Class: Insecta
- Order: Orthoptera
- Suborder: Caelifera
- Family: Acrididae
- Subfamily: Gomphocerinae
- Genus: Psoloessa; Scudder, 1875

Genus of grasshoppers

Psoloessa is a genus of slant-faced grasshoppers in the family Acrididae. There are at least four described species in Psoloessa.

== Species ==
These four species belong to the genus Psoloessa:

- Psoloessa brachyptera (Bruner, 1905)
- Psoloessa delicatula (Scudder, 1876) (brown-spotted range grasshopper)
- Psoloessa microptera Otte, 1979
- Psoloessa texana Scudder, 1875 (Texas spotted range grasshopper)
