= Mesotherm =

Type of animal that produces metabolic heat, but has no specific body temperature

A mesotherm (from Ancient Greek μέσος (mésos) 'middle, moderate, intermediate' and θερμός (thermós) 'warm, hot') is a type of animal with a thermoregulatory strategy intermediate to cold-blooded ectotherms and warm-blooded endotherms.

== Definition ==
Mesotherms have two basic characteristics:

1. Elevation of body temperature via metabolic production of heat.
2. Weak or absent metabolic control of a particular body temperature.

The first trait distinguishes mesotherms from ectotherms, the second from endotherms. For instance, endotherms, when cold, will generally resort to shivering or metabolizing brown fat to maintain a constant body temperature, leading to higher metabolic rates. A mesotherm, however, will experience lower body temperatures and lower metabolic rates as ambient temperature drops. In addition, mesotherm body temperatures tend to rise as body size increases (a phenomenon known as gigantothermy), unlike endotherms. This reflects the lower surface area to volume ratio in large animals, which reduces rates of heat loss.

While extant mesotherms are relatively rare, good examples include tuna, lamnid sharks (e.g., the great white shark), the leatherback sea turtle, some species of bee, naked mole rats, hyraxes, and echidnas.

Historically, the same word was used by de Candolle to describe plants that require a moderate degree of heat for successful growth. In his scheme, a mesotherm plant grew in regions where the warmest month had a mean temperature greater than 22 °C (72 °F) and the coldest month had a mean temperature of at least 6 °C (43 °F).

== Dinosaur thermoregulation ==
The thermoregulatory status of dinosaurs has long been debated, and is still an active area of research. The term 'mesothermy' was originally coined to advocate for an intermediate status of non-avian dinosaur thermoregulation, between endotherms and ectotherms. A more technical definition was provided by Grady et al, who argued for dinosaur mesothermy on the basis of their intermediate growth rates, and the empirical relationship between growth, metabolism and thermoregulation in extant vertebrates.

This viewpoint was challenged by D'Emic, who argued that because growth rates are sensitive to seasonal variation in resources, dinosaur maximum growth rates were underestimated by Grady et al. Adjusting dinosaur rates upwards by a factor of two, D'Emic found dinosaurs to grow similarly to mammals, and thus were likely endothermic. However, sensitivity to seasonal variation in resources should be true for all vertebrates. If all vertebrate taxa were similarly adjusted, the relative differences in rates does not change. Dinosaurs remain intermediate growers and good candidates for mesothermy.

Nonetheless, the dinosaur mesothermy hypothesis requires further support to be confirmed. Fossil oxygen isotopes, which can reveal an organism's body temperature, should be particularly informative. Recently, a study of theropod and sauropod isotopes offered some support for dinosaur mesothermy. Feathered theropods are probably the best candidates for dinosaur endothermy, yet the examined theropods had relatively low body temperatures 32.0 °C (89.6 °F). Large sauropods had higher body temperatures 37.0 °C (98.6 °F), which may be reflective of mesothermic gigantothermy.

== See also ==
- Heterothermy
- Gigantothermy
- Regional endothermy
- Regional heterothermy
- Argentine black and white tegu § Endothermic behavior
