= Ectotherm =

Organism where internal heating sources are small or negligible

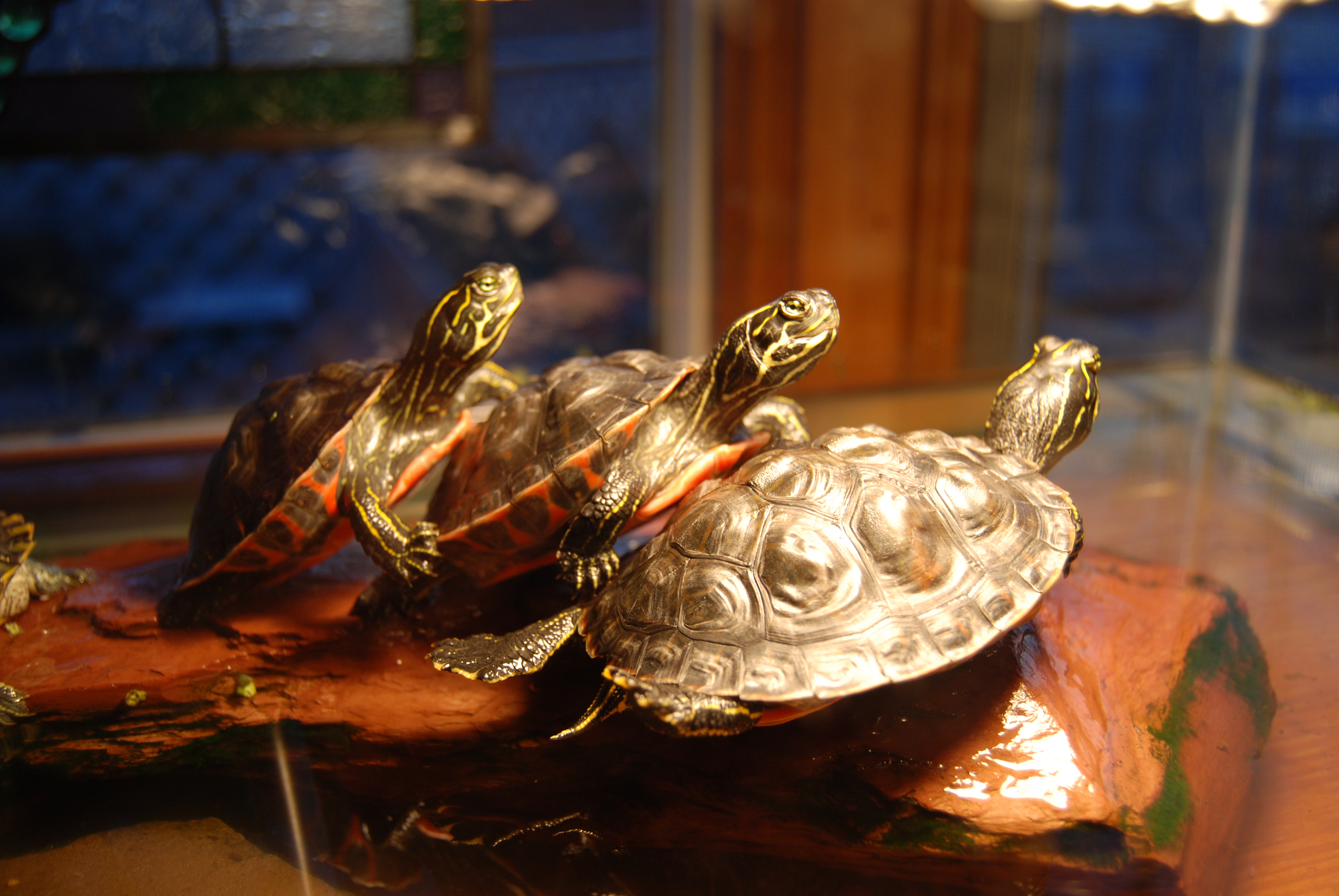
Pseudemys turtles (shown here basking for warmth) are ectothermic.

The red line represents the air temperature. The purple line represents the body temperature of the lizard. The green line represents the base temperature of the burrow. Lizards are ectotherms and use behavioral adaptations to control their temperature. They regulate their behavior based on the temperature outside; if it is warm they will go outside up to a point and return to their burrow as necessary.

An ectotherm (from Ancient Greek ἐκτός (ektós) 'outside' and θερμός (thermós) 'heat'), more commonly referred to as a "cold-blooded animal", is an animal in which internal physiological sources of heat, such as blood, are of relatively small or of quite negligible importance in controlling body temperature. Such organisms (frogs, for example) rely on environmental heat sources, which permit them to operate at very economical metabolic rates.

Some of these animals live in environments where temperatures are practically constant, as is typical of regions of the abyssal ocean and hence can be regarded as homeothermic ectotherms. In contrast, in places where temperature varies so widely as to limit the physiological activities of other kinds of ectotherms, many species habitually seek out external sources of heat or shelter from heat; for example, many reptiles regulate their body temperature by basking in the sun, or seeking shade when necessary in addition to a host of other behavioral thermoregulation mechanisms.

In contrast to ectotherms, endotherms rely largely, even predominantly, on heat from internal metabolic processes, and mesotherms use an intermediate strategy.

Because there are more than two categories of temperature control utilized by animals, the terms warm-blooded and cold-blooded have been deprecated as scientific terms.

== Adaptations ==
Various patterns of behavior enable certain ectotherms to regulate body temperature to a useful extent. To warm up, reptiles and many insects find sunny places and adopt positions that maximise their exposure; at harmfully high temperatures they seek shade or cooler water. In cold weather, honey bees huddle together to retain heat. Butterflies and moths may orient their wings to maximize exposure to solar radiation in order to build up heat before take-off. Gregarious caterpillars, such as the forest tent caterpillar and fall webworm, benefit from basking in large groups for thermoregulation. Many flying insects, such as honey bees and bumble bees, also raise their internal temperatures endothermically prior to flight, by vibrating their flight muscles without violent movement of the wings. Such endothermal activity is an example of the difficulty of consistent application of terms such as poikilothermy and homeothermy.

In addition to behavioral adaptations, physiological adaptations help ectotherms regulate temperature. Diving reptiles conserve heat by heat exchange mechanisms, whereby cold blood from the skin picks up heat from blood moving outward from the body core, re-using and thereby conserving some of the heat that otherwise would have been wasted. The skin of bullfrogs secretes more mucus when it is hot, allowing more cooling by evaporation.

During periods of cold, some ectotherms enter a state of torpor, in which their metabolism slows or, in some cases, such as the wood frog, effectively stops. The torpor might last overnight or last for a season, or even for years, depending on the species and circumstances.

Owners of reptiles may use an ultraviolet light system to assist their pets' basking.

== Pros and cons ==
Ectotherms rely largely on external heat sources such as sunlight to achieve their optimal body temperature for various bodily activities. Accordingly, they depend on ambient conditions to reach operational body temperatures. In contrast, endothermic animals maintain nearly constant high operational body temperatures largely by reliance on internal heat produced by metabolically active organs (liver, kidney, heart, brain, muscle) or even by specialized heat producing organs like brown adipose tissue. Ectotherms typically have lower metabolic rates than endotherms at a given body mass. As a consequence, endotherms generally rely on higher food consumption, and commonly on food of higher energy content. Such requirements may limit the carrying capacity of a given environment for endotherms as compared to its carrying capacity for ectotherms.

Because ectotherms depend on environmental conditions for body temperature regulation, as a rule, they are more sluggish at night and in early mornings. When they emerge from shelter, many diurnal ectotherms need to heat up in the early sunlight before they can begin their daily activities. In cool weather the foraging activity of such species is therefore restricted to the day time in most vertebrate ectotherms, and in cold climates most cannot survive at all. In lizards, for instance, most nocturnal species are geckos specialising in "sit and wait" foraging strategies. Such strategies do not require as much energy as active foraging and do not require hunting activity of the same intensity. From another point of view, sit-and-wait predation may require very long periods of unproductive waiting. Endotherms cannot, in general, afford such long periods without food, but suitably adapted ectotherms can wait without expending much energy. Endothermic vertebrate species are therefore less dependent on the environmental conditions and have developed a higher variability (both within and between species) in their daily patterns of activity.

In ectotherms, fluctuating ambient temperatures may affect the body temperature. Such variation in body temperature is called poikilothermy, though the concept is not widely satisfactory and the use of the term is declining. In small aquatic creatures such as Rotifera, poikilothermy is practically absolute, but other creatures (like crabs) have wider physiological options at their disposal, and they can move to preferred temperatures, avoid ambient temperature changes, or moderate their effects. Ectotherms can also display the features of homeothermy, especially within aquatic organisms. Normally their range of ambient environmental temperatures is relatively constant, and there are few in number that attempt to maintain a higher internal temperature due to the high associated costs.

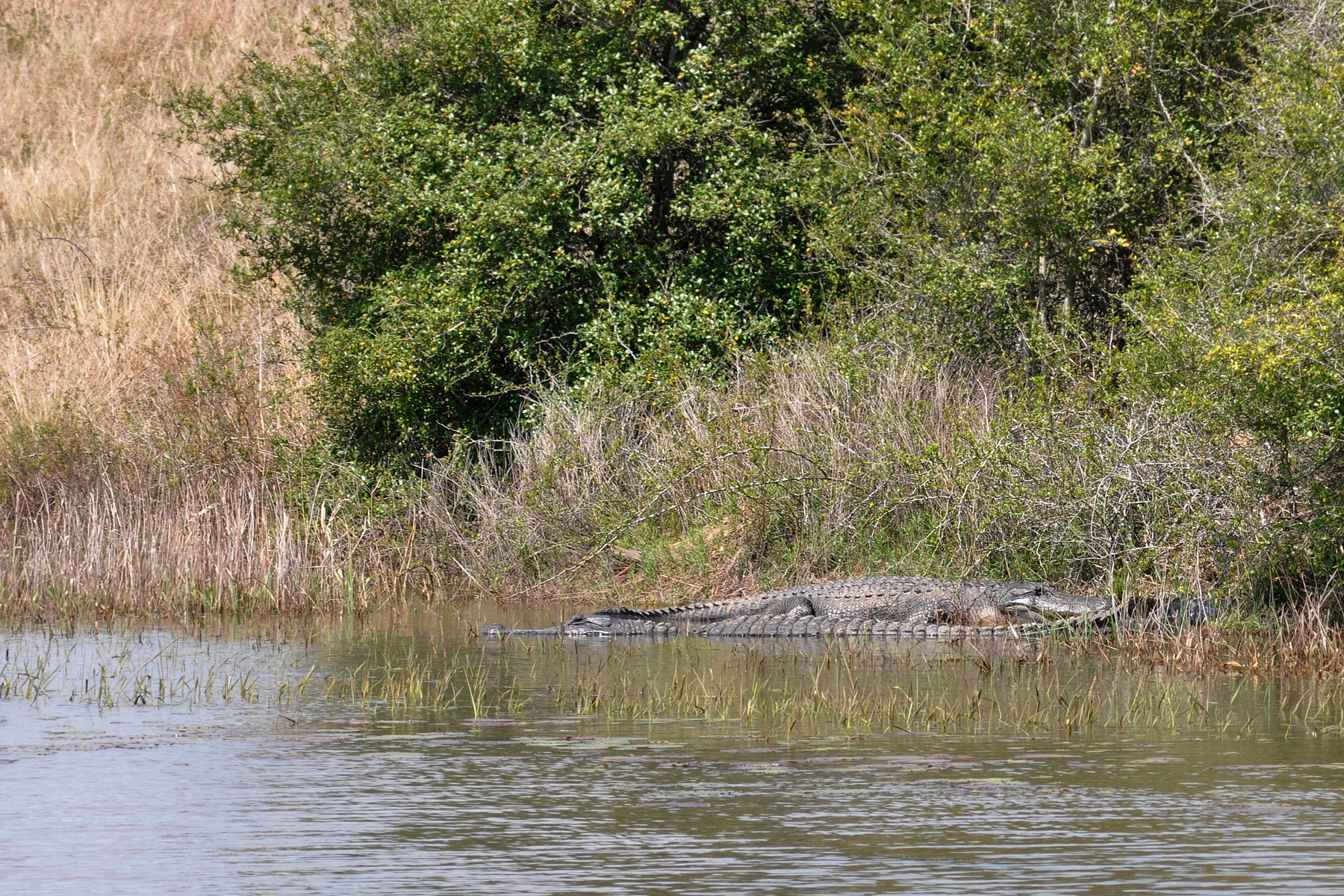
American alligators basking in the sunlight around noon

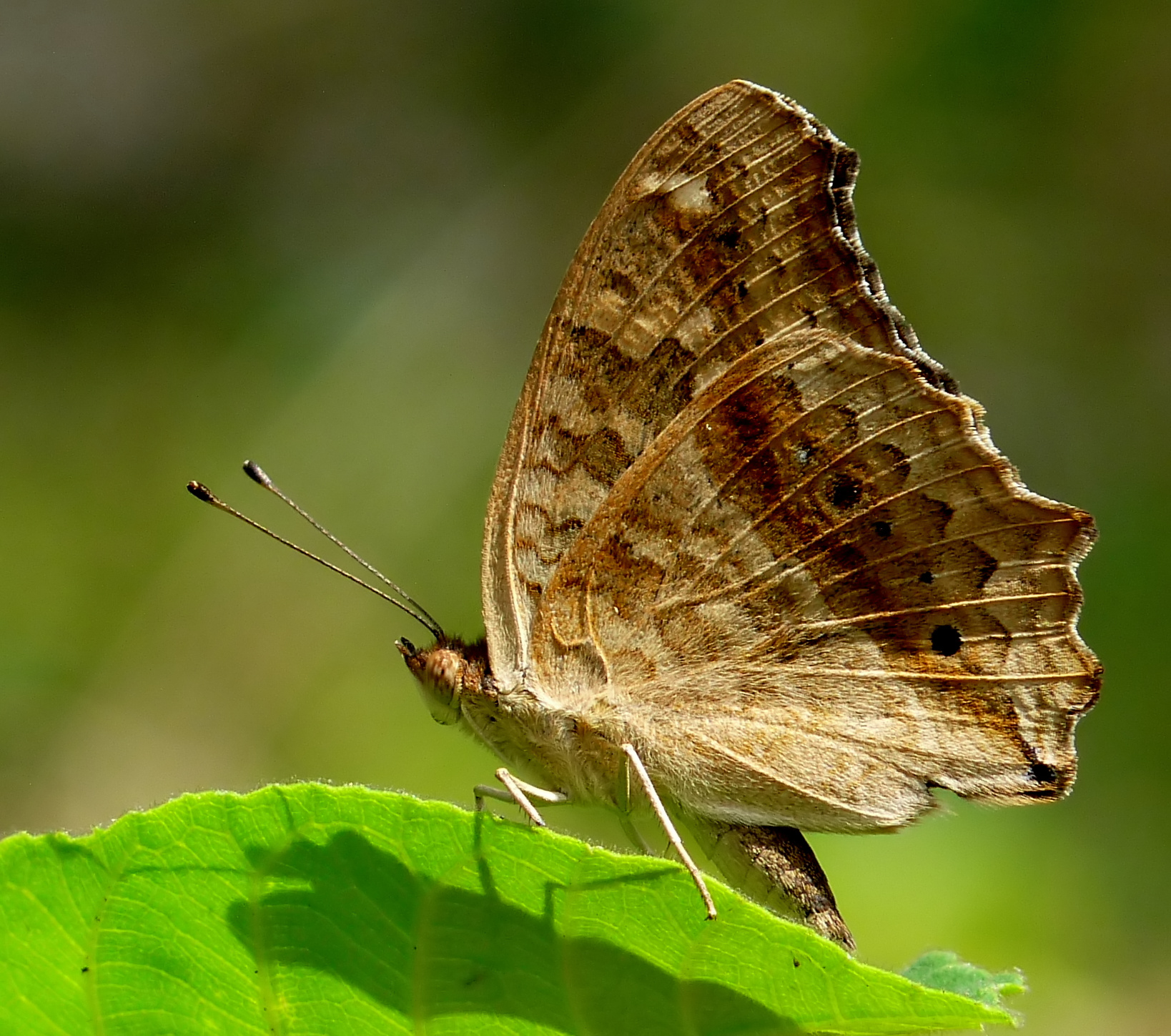
Junonia lemonias basking under the sun

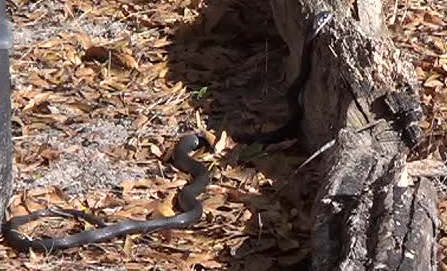
A 1.8m southern black racer basking in the Inverness, Florida, sunshine on a cool morning
