= Psoloessa texana =

Scientific classification
- Domain: Eukaryota
- Kingdom: Animalia
- Phylum: Arthropoda
- Class: Insecta
- Order: Orthoptera
- Suborder: Caelifera
- Family: Acrididae
- Subfamily: Gomphocerinae
- Genus: Psoloessa
- Species: P. texana

Binomial name
- Psoloessa texana Scudder, 1875

Species of grasshopper

Psoloessa texana, the Texas spotted range grasshopper, is a species of slant-faced grasshopper in the family Acrididae. It is found in North America. It preferentially feeds on Bouteloua eriopoda.
