= Homeothermy =

Maintaining stable internal body temperature

The group that includes mammals and birds, both "warm-blooded" homeothermic animals (in red) is polyphyletic.

Homeothermy, homothermy, or homoiothermy (from Ancient Greek ὅμοιος (hómoios) 'similar' and θέρμη (thérmē) 'heat') is a form of thermoregulation.

Homeotherms maintain a stable internal body temperature, regardless of external influence. This temperature is often, though not necessarily, higher than their immediate environment. Homeothermy is one of the three types of thermoregulation in warm-blooded animals. It can be contrasted with poikilothermy, in which an organism's internal temperature fluctuates based on its environment and behaviour.

Homeotherms are not necessarily endothermic. Some maintain consistent body temperatures through behavioural mechanisms alone. Many reptiles use this strategy; some desert lizards maintain near-constant activity temperatures that are often within a degree or two of being lethal. Other species, such as tropical or deep-sea fish, may achieve homeothermy by inhabiting environments with constant temperatures.

== Mechanism ==
Homeothermy is maintained by a thermoregulatory system that continuously stabilizes core temperature, especially within the thermal neutral zone where environmental influence is minimal. Rather than relying only on local temperature sensing, this regulation is proposed to depend on detecting small fluctuations in whole-body heat content, enabling highly sensitive feedback control. This allows for fine-tuned adjustment of metabolic heat production and loss mechanisms (e.g., vasomotion, sweating, shivering) to maintain stable internal thermal homeostasis over time.

== Origin ==
Common hypotheses for the origin of homeothermy include:

1. Metabolic Efficiency Hypothesis: This hypothesis suggests that homeothermy evolved as a result of increased metabolic efficiency. Maintaining a consistent internal temperature allows for optimal enzyme activity and biochemical reactions. This efficiency could have provided an advantage in terms of sustained activity levels, improved foraging, and enhanced muscle function.
2. Endothermic Parental Care Hypothesis: This hypothesis proposes that homeothermy developed as a way to provide consistent and warm internal environments for developing embryos or young offspring. Endothermy could have enabled parents to keep their eggs or young warm, leading to improved survival rates and successful reproduction.
3. Activity Level Hypothesis: Homeothermy might have evolved to facilitate sustained activity levels. Cold-blooded animals are often limited by external temperatures, which can affect their ability to hunt, escape predators, and carry out other essential activities. Homeothermy could have provided a selective advantage by allowing animals to be active for longer periods of time, increasing their chances of survival.
4. Predator-Prey Dynamics: The evolution of homeothermy could be linked to predator-prey dynamics. If predators were cold-blooded while their prey were warm-blooded, the predators might have struggled to hunt efficiently in cooler conditions. Homeothermy in prey species could have provided a competitive advantage by allowing them to maintain consistent performance across a wider range of temperatures.
5. Environmental Instability: Fluctuations in the Earth's climate over evolutionary timescales could have driven the development of homeothermy. Environments with unpredictable temperature changes might have favored animals that could regulate their body temperature internally, allowing them to adapt to varying conditions.
6. Coevolution with Microorganisms: Homeothermy might have evolved in response to interactions with microorganisms, such as parasites and pathogens. Warm-blooded animals could have gained an advantage by creating an inhospitable environment for many disease-causing organisms, thus reducing the risk of infections.
7. Insulation and Thermoregulation: Homeothermy could have originated as a response to the development of insulating structures like fur, feathers, or other coverings. As animals developed these insulating features, they would have been better equipped to maintain a stable internal temperature. Over time, this could have led to more advanced mechanisms for thermoregulation.
8. Altitude and Oxygen Availability: Some researchers suggest that homeothermy might have evolved as animals migrated to higher altitudes where oxygen levels are lower. Homeothermy could have helped compensate for the reduced oxygen availability, ensuring efficient oxygen utilization and overall metabolic function.
9. Migratory Patterns: Animals that migrated long distances would have encountered a wide range of temperature conditions. Homeothermy could have evolved as a way to maintain energy-efficient migration by reducing the need to frequently stop and warm up.
10. Energetic Benefits: Homeothermy might have provided energetic advantages by allowing animals to exploit a wider range of ecological niches and food sources. Warm-blooded animals could have survived in habitats where cold-blooded competitors struggled due to temperature limitations.

== Advantages ==
Enzymes have a relatively narrow temperature range at which their efficiencies are optimal. Temperatures outside this range can greatly reduce the rate of a reaction or stop it altogether. A creature with a fairly constant body temperature can therefore specialize in enzymes which are efficient at that particular temperature. A poikilotherm must either operate well below optimum efficiency most of the time, migrate, hibernate or expend extra resources producing a wider range of enzymes to cover the wider range of body temperatures.

However, some environments offer much more consistent temperatures than others. For example, the tropics often have seasonal variations in temperature that are smaller than their diurnal variations. In addition, large bodies of water, such as the ocean and very large lakes, have moderate temperature variations. The waters below the ocean surface are particularly stable in temperature.

== Disadvantages ==
Because many homeothermic animals use enzymes that are specialized for a narrow range of body temperatures, hypothermia leads more rapidly to torpor and death. Additionally, homeothermy obtained from endothermy is a high energy strategy and many environments will offer lower carrying capacity to these organisms. In cold weather, the energy expenditure to maintain body temperature accelerates starvation and may lead to death.

== See also ==
- Heterothermy
- Gigantothermy
