= Thermal neutral zone =

Minimal metabolic regulation to retain ambient core body temperature

Endothermic organisms known as homeotherms maintain internal temperatures with minimal metabolic regulation within a range of ambient temperatures called the thermal neutral zone (TNZ). Within the TNZ the basal rate of heat production is equal to the rate of heat loss to the environment. Homeothermic organisms adjust to the temperatures within the TNZ through different responses requiring little energy.

Environmental temperatures can cause fluctuations in a homeothermic organism's metabolic rate. This response is due to the energy required to maintain a relatively constant body temperature above ambient temperature by controlling heat loss and heat gain. The degree of this response depends not only on the species, but also on the levels of insulative and metabolic adaptation. Environmental temperatures below the TNZ, the lower critical temperature (LCT), require an organism to increase its metabolic rate to meet the environmental demands for heat. The Regulation about the TNZ requires metabolic heat production when the LCT is reached, as heat is lost to the environment. The organism reaches the LCT when the T_{a} (ambient temp.) decreases.

When an organism reaches this stage the metabolic rate increases significantly and thermogenesis increases the T_{b} (body temp.) If the T_{a} continues to decrease far below the LCT hypothermia occurs. Alternatively, evaporative heat loss for cooling occurs when temperatures above the TNZ, the upper critical zone (UCT), are realized (Speakman and Keijer 2013). When the T_{a} reaches too far above the UCT, the rate of heat gain and rate of heat production become higher than the rate of heat dissipation (heat loss through evaporative cooling), resulting in hyperthermia.

It can show postural changes where it changes its body shape or moves and exposes different areas to the sun/shade, and through radiation, convection and conduction, heat exchange occurs. Vasomotor responses allow control of the flow of blood between the periphery and the core to control heat loss from the surface of the body. Lastly, the organism can show insulation adjustments; a common example being "goosebumps" in humans where hair follicles are raised by pilomotor muscles, also shown in animals' pelage and plumage.

== In humans ==
The thermoneutral zone describes a range of temperatures of the immediate environment in which a standard healthy adult can maintain normal body temperature without needing to use energy above and beyond normal basal metabolic rate. Note this is for a nude resting human and does not allow for clothing, shivering, sweating or exercising. This zone ranges from 27 to 31°C. Even with light clothing, radiation and convection losses are dramatically reduced, effectively reducing the TNZ. Hence, a comfortable temperature in a heated building may be 18 - 22 degrees Celsius (64.4 - 71.6 degrees Fahrenheit).

Humans produce an obligatory 100 W (0.13 hp) of heat energy at rest as a by-product from basic processes like pumping blood, digesting, breathing, biochemical synthesis and catabolism etc. This is comparable to a common incandescent light-bulb. However, adult humans can produce in excess of 1,000 W (1.3 hp) of heat energy during strenuous exercise. Hence, if the body were perfectly insulated, core temperature would continue to increase until lethal core temperatures were achieved. Conversely, we are normally in surroundings that are considerably cooler than the body's core temperature of 37 °C (98.6 °F) creating a gradient for thermal energy flow from the core to the surroundings. Therefore, the body must ensure it can also minimize the loss of heat to around 100 watts, if it is to maintain core temperature. In short, the skin must be able to get rid of 100 watts of heat in relatively warm environments, but also ensure that it does not lose too much more than this in relatively cold environments.

The human outer or peripheral shell (skin, subcutaneous fat etc.) acts as an adjustable insulator/radiator with the main mechanism of adjustment being blood flow to this compartment. If the surroundings are warm then heat loss is less, so the body directs more blood to the periphery to maintain the gradient for energy flow. Conversely, if the surroundings are cool, blood flow can be profoundly reduced to the skin, so that heat loss is reduced significantly.

These passive processes determine the TNZ, as negligible work is done to redirect blood to the peripheries or the core.

Physiological mechanisms:

The skin has a huge capacity to accept blood flow resulting in a range of 1ml/100g of skin/min, to 150ml/100g/min. Its metabolic requirements are very low and hence it only requires a very small fraction of the heart's output to maintain its own growth and metabolism. In temperate environments the blood flow to the skin is much higher than required for metabolism, the determining factor is the need for the body to get rid of its heat. In fact, skin can survive for long periods of time (hours) with sub-physiological blood flow and oxygenation, and, as long as this is followed by a period of good perfusion, necrosis will not occur.

In temperate environments there is room to increase or decrease blood flow to the skin dramatically. This is achieved by way of special arrangements in the vascular beds of the skin. There are significant numbers of extra vessels, especially in the extremities with their large surface areas (hands, ears, toes etc.). These are direct connections between artery and vein which bypass nourishing capillaries, and are controlled by the sympathetic nervous system. These shunts are normally mostly closed, but opening them up allows the skin to become engorged with blood, and because these vessels have low resistance, the blood flow through them is brisk. Conversely, when blood supply to the skin must be reduced these shunts can be closed and furthermore, the normal mechanism of vasoconstriction of arterioles, can dramatically reduce perfusion of the skin.

== Across species ==
Different species have different temperatures of their thermal neutral zones.

In dogs, the thermoneutral zone ranges from 20–30 °C (68–86 °F). Domestic cats have a considerably higher thermoneutral zone, ranging between 30–38 °C (86–100 °F).

In horses, the lower critical temperature is 5 °C while the upper critical temperature depends on the definition used. Their thermoneutral zone is roughly 5–30 °C (41–86 °F).

In mice, the lower critical temperature and upper critical temperature can be the same, creating a thermoneutral point instead of a thermoneutral zone. This point varies throughout the day depending on whether the mouse is in the active dark phase (33 °C) or the resting light phase (29 °C).
