= Torpor =

State of decreased physiological activity in an animal

Torpor is a state of decreased physiological activity in an animal, usually marked by a reduced body temperature and metabolic rate. Torpor enables animals to survive periods of reduced food availability. The term "torpor" can refer to the time a hibernator spends at low body temperature, lasting days to weeks, or it can refer to a period of low body temperature and metabolism lasting less than 24 hours.

The word comes from the early 13th century, originating from the Latin, torpor, to be numb or sluggish.

Animals that undergo torpor include birds (hummingbirds, notably strisores) and some mammals, including many marsupial species, rodent species (such as mice), and in many families of bats as a result of convergent evolution. During the active part of their day, such animals maintain normal body temperature and activity levels, but their metabolic rate and body temperature drop during a portion of the day (usually night) to conserve energy. Some animals seasonally go into long periods of inactivity, with reduced body temperature and metabolism, made up of multiple bouts of torpor. This is known as hibernation if it occurs during winter or aestivation if it occurs during the summer. Daily torpor, on the other hand, is not seasonally dependent and can be an important part of energy conservation at any time of year. Torpor is a well-controlled thermoregulatory process and not, as previously thought, the result of switching off thermoregulation.

== Evolution ==
=== Endothermy and the Origins of Torpor ===
The evolution of torpor likely accompanied the development of homeothermy. Animals capable of maintaining a body temperature above ambient temperature when other members of its species do not would have a fitness advantage. Benefits of maintaining internal temperatures include increased foraging time and less susceptibility to extreme drops in temperature. This adaptation of increasing body temperature to forage has been observed in small nocturnal mammals when they first wake up in the evening.

Although homeothermy lends advantages such as increased activity levels, small mammals and birds maintaining an internal body temperature spend up to 100 times more energy in low ambient temperatures compared to ectotherms. To cope with this challenge, these animals maintain a much lower body temperature, staying just over ambient temperature rather than at normal operating temperature. This reduction in body temperature and metabolic rate allows the prolonged survival of animals capable of entering torpid states.

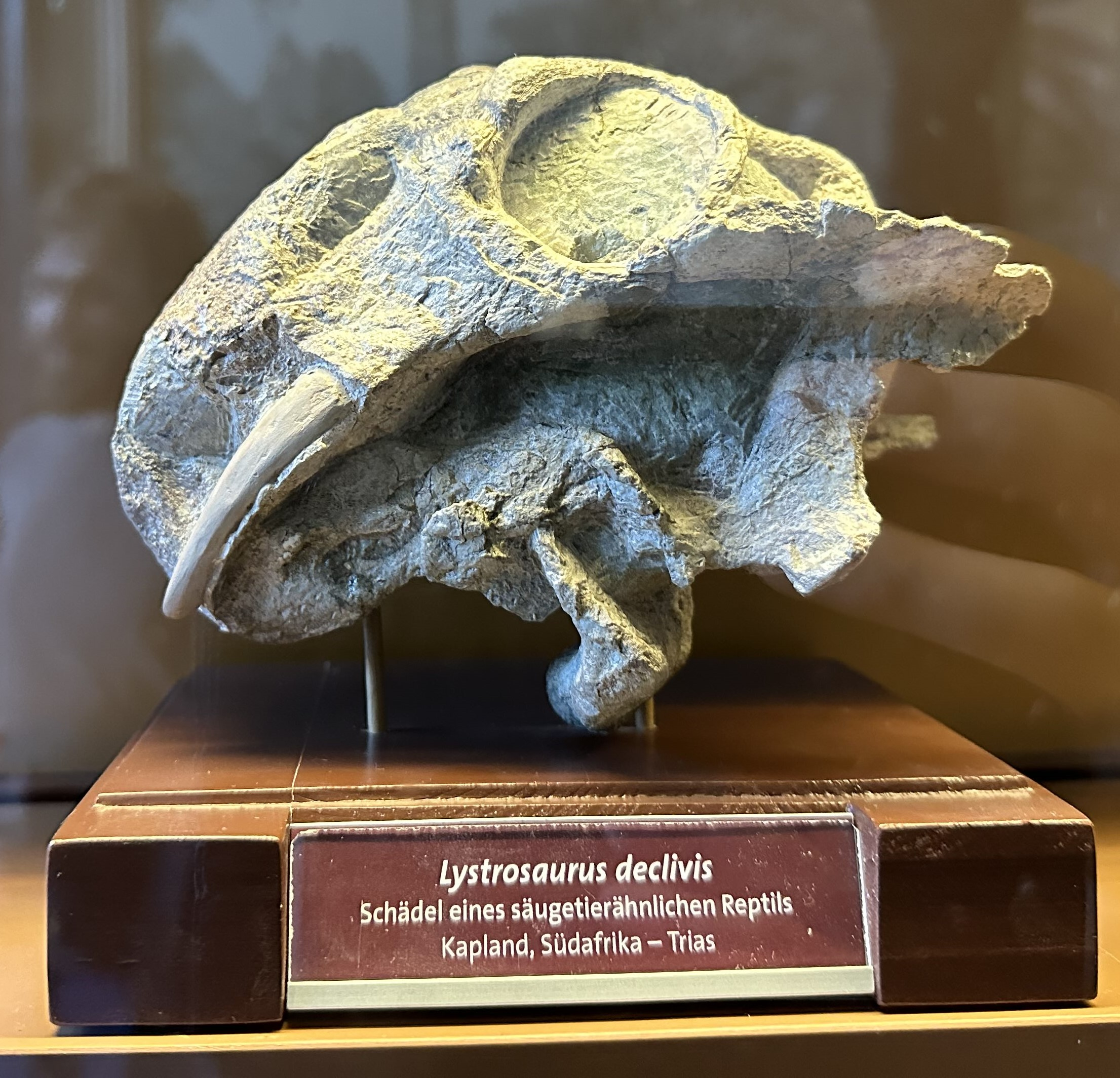
Lystrosaurus skull showing prominent tusks; growth rings within these tusks (not visible externally) have been used to infer periodic metabolic stress consistent with torpor-like states.

=== Fossil Evidence: Torpor in Lystrosaurus ===
In 2020, scientists reported evidence of the torpor in Lystrosaurus living ~250 Mya in Antarctica – the oldest evidence of a hibernation-like state in a vertebrate animal.

== Physiology ==
A number of physiological changes occur during bouts of torpor, including reductions in metabolic rates, body temperature, heart rate, breathing rate and breathing patterns. These changes are controlled by the autonomic nervous system, which controls thermoregulation, neuroendocrine control and timing of torpor in response to environmental stimuli. Hormones like melatonin also function in the seasonal regulation of torpor. While the initiation of torpor is determined by circadian or cirannual cycles, reduction of resources, and other environmental stimuli, some animals reduce their body temperature and heart rate weeks before torpor entry, a physiological preparation for torpor to minimize energy expenditure even before it starts.

Even with thermoconforming heterotherms (allowing body temperature to fluctuate with surrounding temperature), thermoregulation is persisted throughout torpor, as to maintain a body temperature to prevent tissue damage. Torpor, unlike cold-induced hypothermia, is a precisely controlled physiological state which involves coordination between thermoregulation, temperature effects, physiological inhibition and other processes during a cycle.

At the end of a torpor bout, torpid animals can rewarm endogenously through heat production by shivering thermogenesis and/or non-shivering thermogenesis, at a rate much faster than cooling. It was previously believed that eutherian arousal relies on a heat-producing brown adipose tissue (BAT) as a mechanism to accelerate rewarming, but this view is no longer supported, as birds, monotremes, and marsupials rewarm from torpor at a similar rate without possessing BAT.

== Functions ==
Slowing metabolic rate to conserve energy in times of insufficient resources is the primarily noted purpose of torpor. This conclusion is largely based on laboratory studies where torpor was observed to follow food deprivation. There is evidence for other adaptive functions of torpor where animals are observed in natural contexts:

=== Circadian rhythm during torpor ===
Animals that can enter torpor rely on biological rhythms such as circadian and circannual rhythms to continue natural functions. Different animals will manage their circadian rhythm differently, and in some species it's seen to completely stop (such as in European hamsters). Other organisms, such as a black bear, enter torpor and switch to multi-day cycles rather than rely on a circadian rhythm. However, it is seen that both captive and wild bears express similar circadian rhythms when entering torpor. Bears entering torpor in a simulated den with no light expressed normal but low functioning rhythms. The same was observed in wild bears denning in natural areas. The function of circadian rhythms in black, brown, and polar bears suggest that their system of torpor is evolutionarily advanced.

=== Energy conservation in small birds ===
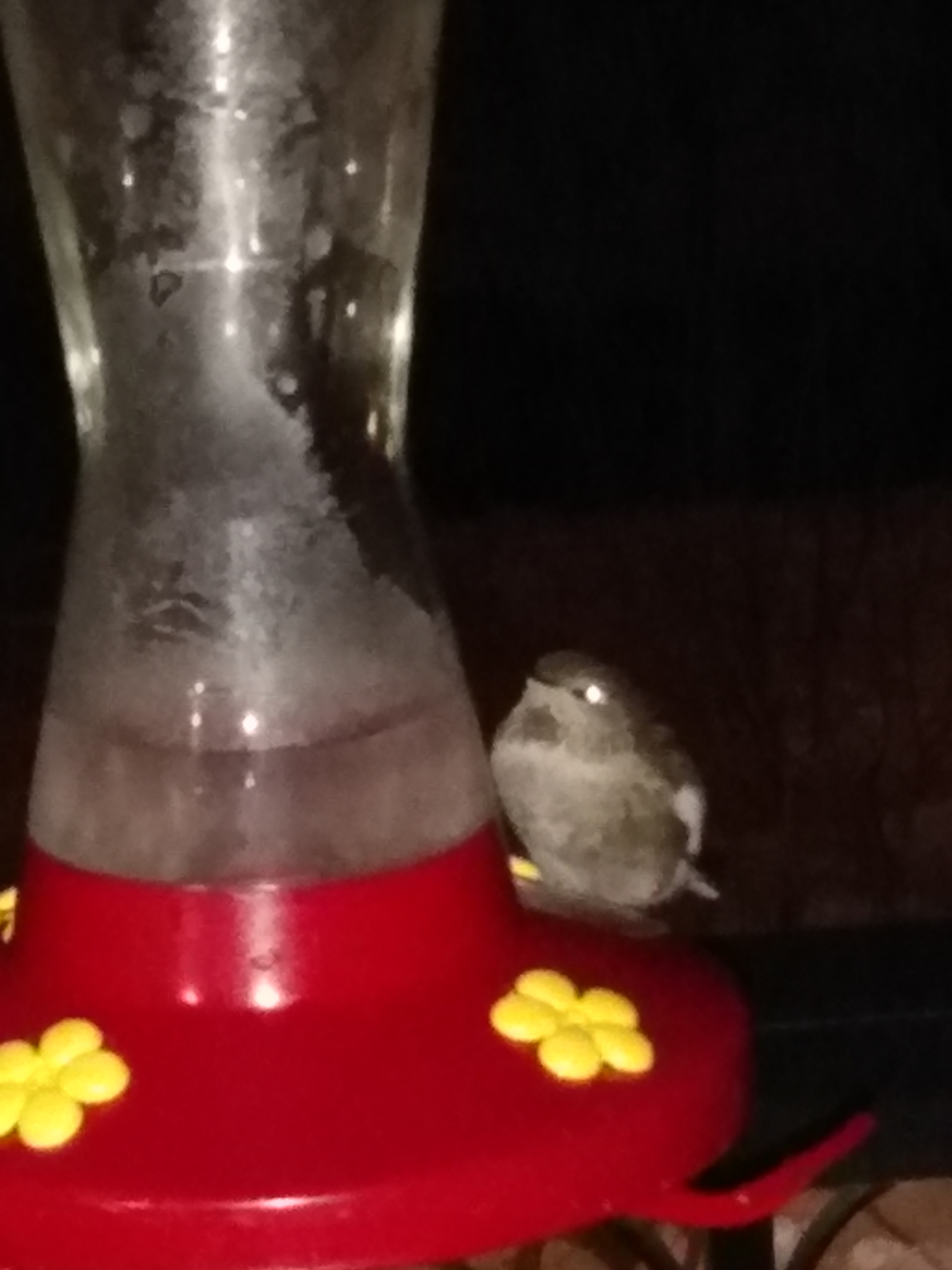
Anna's hummingbird (Calypte anna) in nocturnal torpor during a cold winter night (−8 °C (18 °F) near Vancouver, British Columbia. The bird remained in torpor with an unchanged position for more than 12 hours.

Torpor has been shown to be a strategy of small migrant birds to preserve their body energy stores. Hummingbirds, resting at night during migration, were observed to enter torpor which helped to conserve fat stores during migration or cold nights at high altitude.

This strategy of using torpor to preserve energy stores, such as fat, has also been observed in wintering chickadees. Black-capped chickadees, living in temperate forests of North America, do not migrate south during winter. The chickadee can maintain a body temperature 12 °C lower than normal. This reduction in metabolism allows it to conserve 30% of fat stores amassed from the previous day.

=== Advantage in environments with unpredictable food sources ===
Torpor can be a strategy of animals with unpredictable food supplies. For example, high-latitude living rodents use torpor seasonally when not reproducing. These rodents use torpor as means to survive winter and live to reproduce in the next reproduction cycle when food sources are plentiful, separating periods of torpor from the reproduction period. The eastern long-eared bat uses torpor during winter and is able to arouse and forage during warm periods. Some animals use torpor during their reproductive cycle, as seen in unpredictable habitats. They experience the cost of a prolonged reproduction period but the payoff is survival to be able to reproduce at all.

=== Survival during mass extinctions ===
It is suggested that this daily torpor use may have allowed survival through mass extinction events. Heterotherms make up only four out of 61 mammals confirmed to have gone extinct over the last 500 years. Torpor enables animals to reduce energy requirements allowing them to better survive harsh conditions.

=== Inter-species competition ===
Interspecific competition occurs when two species require the same resource for energy production. Torpor increases fitness in the case of inter-specific competition with the nocturnal common spiny mouse. When the golden spiny mouse experiences reduced food availability by diet overlap with the common spiny mouse it spends more time in a torpid state.

== Torpor in bats ==
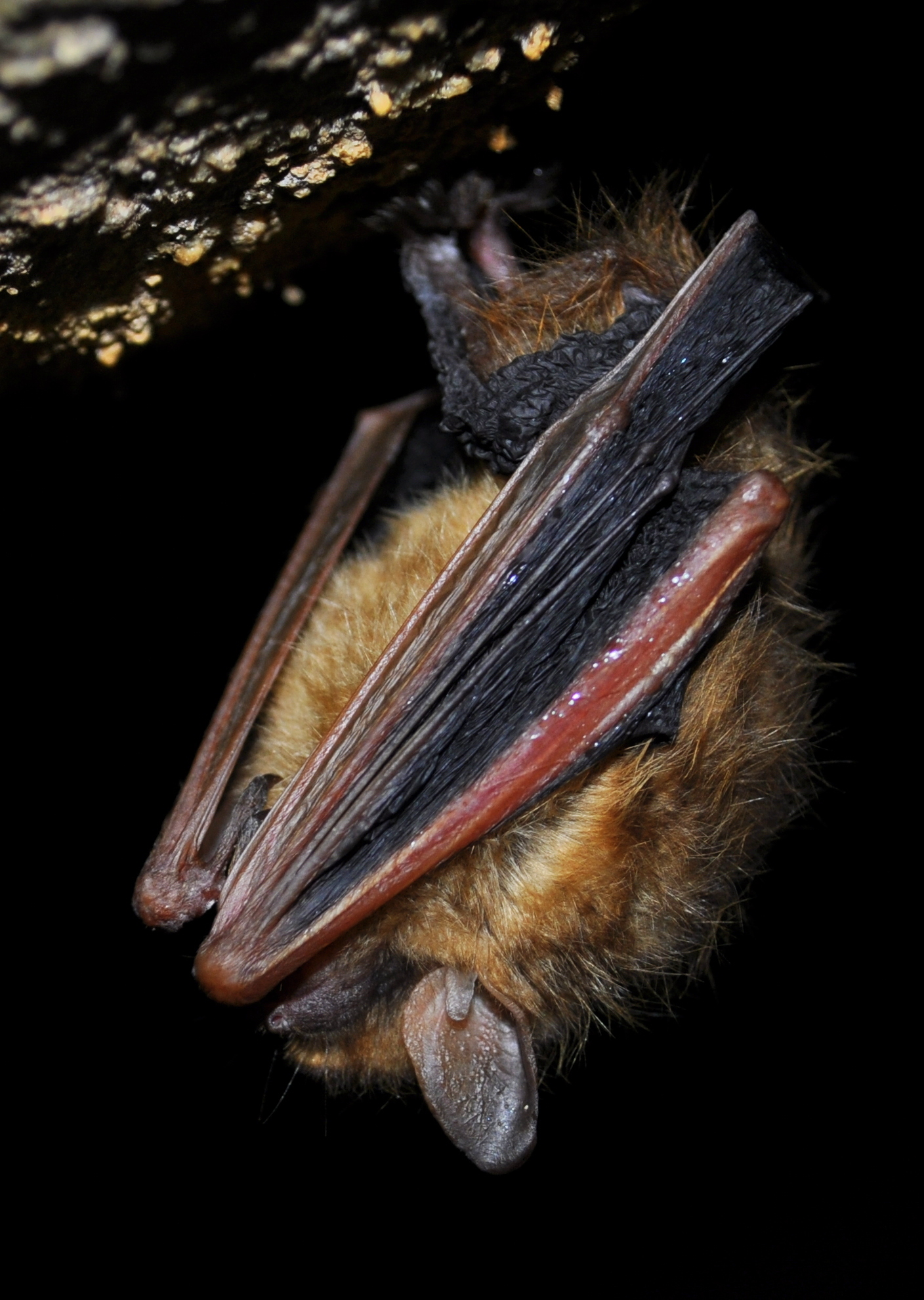
Tri-colored bat Perimyotis subflavus in torpor (family Vespertilionidae)

Bats are endotherms with a high surface area to volume ratio. They torpor to maintain a high, stable body temperature in cold environments and to conserve energy. It occurs not only in winter but also during summer when food shortages occur and to store energy. Pregnant female pipistrelles maintain a high body temperature in the spring, allowing the fetus to grow, which requires a great amount of energy. When facing cold and wet weather that isn’t suitable for foraging, they enter torpor to save energy. Another example is seen in the blossom bat, Syconycteris australi. During winter on the New South Wales north coast, with longer night periods and a mild temperature, they can forage on numerous flowering plants. However, in summer, with shorter nighttime and foraging times, nectar availability is reduced, leading to summer torpor to conserve energy.

Torpor is commonly seen in bats. Australia, for instance, six of seven bat families use torpor, including Emballonuridae, Rhinolophidae, Hipposideridae, Vespertilionidae, and Molossidae. It's also seen in bats in temperate and tropical regions, such as Rhinolophidae and Vespertilionidae in temperate zones, insectivores in tropical zones, and megabats such as Nyctimene albiventer, Paranyctimene raptor and Megaloglossus woermanni.

During torpor, bats experience a series of physiological changes. In order to conserve energy, it reduces metabolic rate by decreasing heart rate, breathing rate and oxygen consumption, leading to a reduction in body temperature. However, the body temperature is controlled to maintain above the species minimum. There are also changes in the blood supply. Blood supplies only the important organs, such as the brain and heart, not the limbs.

=== Parasite resistance by bats ===
A drop in temperature from torpor has been shown to reduce the ability of parasites to reproduce. In temperate zones, the reproductive rates of ectoparasites on bats decrease when the bats enter torpor. In regions where bats do not undergo torpor, the parasites maintain a consistent reproductive rate throughout the year.

=== Arouse from torpor ===
It can take about 10 to 30 minutes for bats to fully arouse from torpor. They increase their heart and breathing rates to initiate the warming process. And to reach normothermic level, they increase body temperature by circulating warm blood throughout the body, and this warming process can be accelerated by shivering.

Arousal from torpor is likely triggered by several factors, including environmental conditions and physiological needs. Light and dark cycles and temperature are environmental cues for bats to arouse, which mostly occur at sunset and dusk or when the environmental temperature is relatively high. These factors are intertwined with bats' physiological adaptations. The time of arousal is just before their nocturnal activity period. At night, they consume energy by feeding and hydrating to recover or move to another torpor site. Arousal that occurs too early in the day may result in a waste of energy. A high environmental temperature may reduce the energy cost required during arousal. Some bat species have developed strategies to minimize this cost by passive rewarming. N. geoffroyi aroused near noon, they utilize the rising environmental temperature to reduce the energy required for rewarming.

=== Variety in torpor and arousal ===
Different species of bats can experience different torpor durations and arousal frequencies due to many factors, including size, age, roosting habitats, and latitude. A study by Altringham suggests that smaller bats arouse less frequently than larger bats due to their higher energy expenditure, younger bats torpor less frequently than older bats to grow, and clustering bats arouse more frequently by having higher body temperature compared to the environment than solitary bats. Another study by Czenze et al indicates that bats in higher latitudes have a longer torpor period, relate to lower environmental temperatures.

== Applications in space travel ==
In 2013, SpaceWorks Engineering began researching a way to dramatically cut the cost of a human expedition to Mars by putting the crew in extended torpor for 90 to 180 days. Traveling while hibernating would reduce astronauts' metabolic functions and minimize requirements for life support during multi-year missions.

== See also ==
- Critical thermal maximum
- Dormancy
- Stupor
