= Poikilotherm =

Organism with considerable internal temperature variation

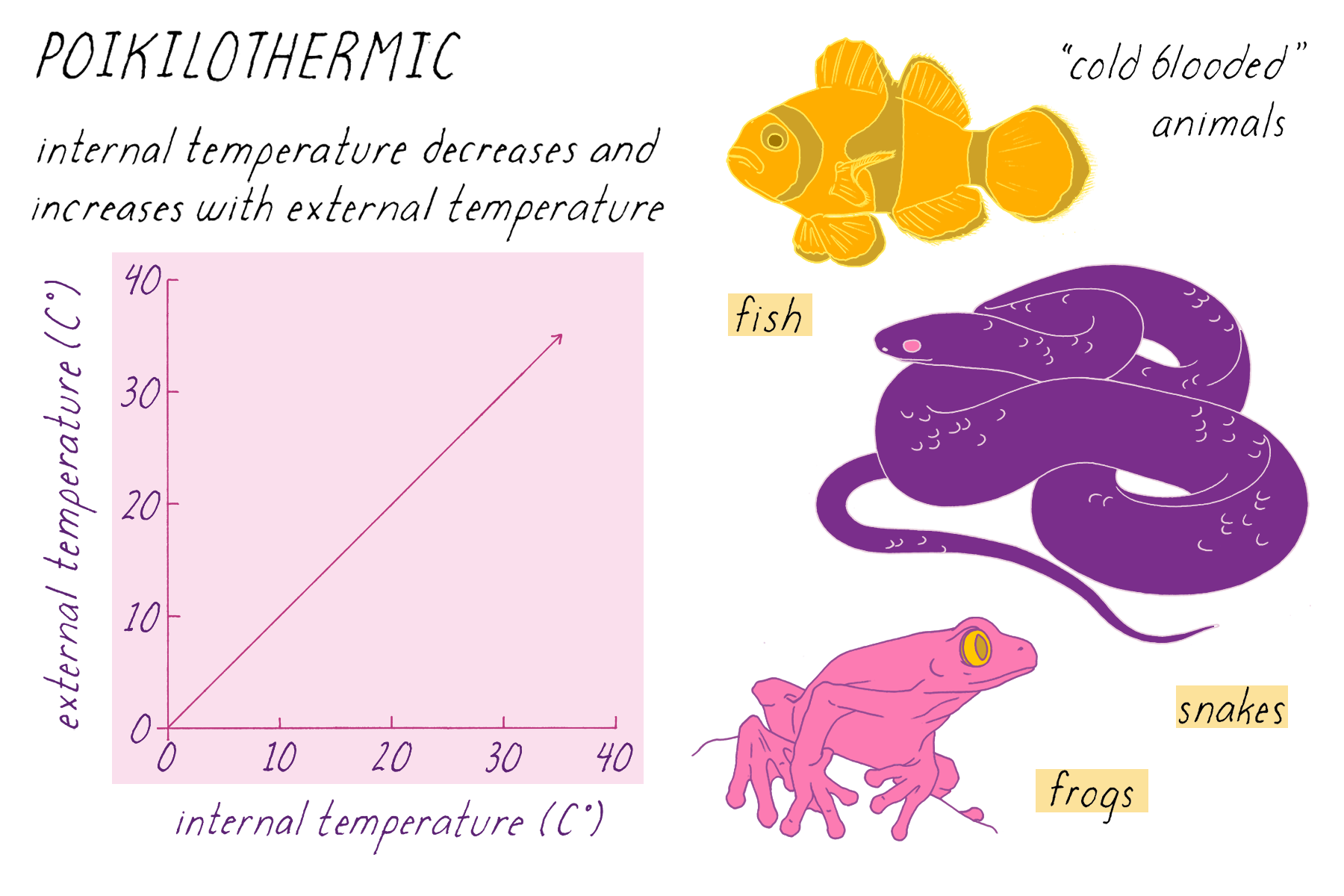
Poikilothermic animals, also called cold blooded animals, whose internal temperatures fluctuate with their external environmental temperature.

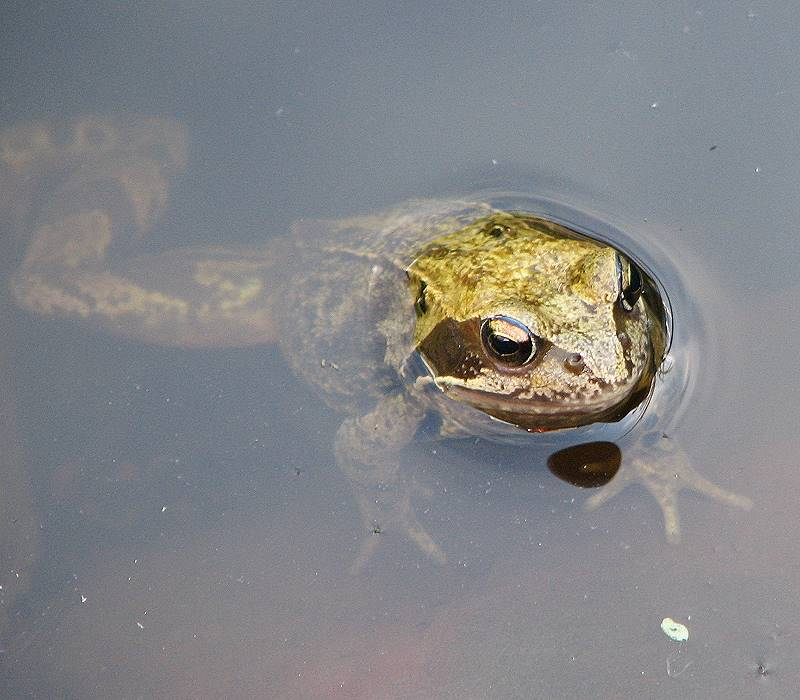
The common frog is a poikilotherm and is able to function over a wide range of body core temperatures.

A poikilotherm (/ˈpɔɪkələˌθɜːrm, pɔɪˈkɪləˌθɜːrm/) is an animal (Greek poikilos – 'various', 'spotted', and therme – 'heat') whose internal temperature varies considerably. Poikilotherms have to survive and adapt to environmental stress. One of the most important stressors is outer environment temperature change, which can lead to alterations in membrane lipid order and can cause protein unfolding and denaturation at elevated temperatures. Poikilotherm is the opposite of homeotherm – an animal which maintains thermal homeostasis. Usually the fluctuations are a consequence of variation in the ambient environmental temperature. Many terrestrial ectotherms are poikilothermic. However some ectotherms seek constant-temperature environments to the point that they are able to maintain a constant internal temperature, and are considered actual or practical homeotherms. It is this distinction that often makes the term poikilotherm more useful than the vernacular "cold-blooded", which is sometimes used to refer to ectotherms more generally.

Poikilothermic animals include types of vertebrate animals, specifically some fish, amphibians, and reptiles, as well as many invertebrate animals. The naked mole-rat and sloths are some of the rare mammals which are poikilothermic.

== Etymology ==
The term derives from Greek poikilos (ποικίλος), meaning "varied," ultimately from a root meaning "dappled" or "painted," and thermos (θερμός), meaning "heat".

== Physiology ==
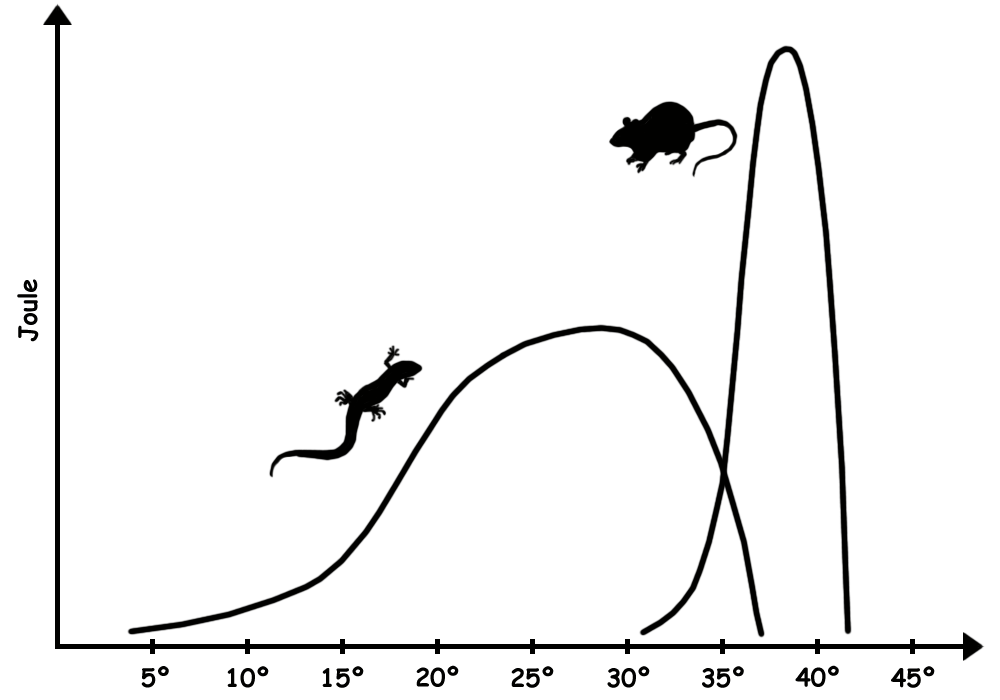
Sustained energy output of a poikilotherm (a lizard) and a homeotherm (a mouse) as a function of core body temperature. The homeotherm has a much higher output, but can only function over a very narrow range of body temperatures.

Poikilotherm animals must be able to function over a wider range of temperatures than homeotherms. The speed of most chemical reactions vary with temperature, and in order to function poikilotherms may have four to ten enzyme systems that operate at different temperatures for an important chemical reaction. As a result, poikilotherms often have larger, more complex genomes than homeotherms in the same ecological niche. Frogs are a notable example of this effect, though their complex development is also an important factor in their large genome.

Because their metabolism is variable and generally below that of homeothermic animals, sustained high-energy activities like powered flight in large animals or maintaining a large brain is generally beyond poikilotherm animals. The metabolism of poikilotherms favors strategies such as sit-and-wait hunting over chasing prey for larger animals with high movement cost. As they do not use their metabolisms to heat or cool themselves, total energy requirement over time is low. For the same body weight, poikilotherms need only 5 to 10% of the energy of homeotherms.

== Adaptations in poikilotherms ==
- Some adaptations are behavioral. Lizards and snakes often bask in the sun in the early morning and late evening, and seek shelter around noon.
- The eggs of the yellow-faced bumblebee are unable to regulate heat. A behavioral adaptation to combat this is incubation, where to maintain the internal temperatures of eggs, the queen and her workers will incubate the brood almost constantly, by warming their abdomens and touching them to the eggs. The bumblebee generates heat by shivering flight muscles even though it is not flying.
- Termite mounds are usually oriented in a north–south direction so that they absorb as much heat as possible around dawn and dusk and minimise heat absorption around noon.
- Tuna are able to warm their entire bodies through a heat exchange mechanism called the rete mirabile, which helps keep heat inside the body and minimises the loss of heat through the gills. They also have their swimming muscles near the center of their bodies instead of near the surface, which minimises heat loss.
- Gigantothermy means growing to large size in order to reduce heat loss, as in sea turtles and ice-age megafauna. As body size increases, body volume increases proportionally faster than does body surface. Less body surface area per unit body volume tends to reduce heat loss.
- Camels, although they are homeotherms, thermoregulate using a method termed "temperature cycling" to conserve energy. In hot deserts, they allow their body temperature to rise during the day and fall during the night, adjusting their body temperature to cycle over approximately 6 °C.

== Ecology ==
It is comparatively easy for a poikilotherm to accumulate enough energy to reproduce. Poikilotherms at the same trophic level often have much shorter generations than homeotherms: weeks rather than years. Such applies even to animals with similar ecological roles such as cats and snakes.

This difference in energy requirement also means that a given food source can support a greater density of poikilothermic animals than homeothermic animals. This is reflected in the predator-prey ratio which is usually higher in poikilothermic fauna compared to homeothermic ones. However, when homeotherms and poikilotherms have similar niches, and compete, the homeotherm can often drive poikilothermic competitors to extinction, because homeotherms can gather food for a greater fraction of each day and in more effective, specialized ways (e.g. chimpanzees actively seeking out and collecting army ants with sticks versus the typical poikilotherm sit-and-wait strategy).

== In medicine ==
In medicine, loss of normal thermoregulation is referred to as poikilothermia. This can be seen in compartment syndrome and with use of sedative-hypnotics like barbiturates, ethanol, and chloral hydrate. REM sleep is considered a poikilothermic state in humans. Poikilothermia is one of the signs of acute limb ischemia.
