= Energy homeostasis =

Biological process

In biology, energy homeostasis, or the homeostatic control of energy balance, is a biological process that involves the coordinated homeostatic regulation of food intake (energy inflow) and energy expenditure (energy outflow). The human brain, particularly the hypothalamus, plays a central role in regulating energy homeostasis and generating the sense of hunger by integrating a number of biochemical signals that transmit information about energy balance. Fifty percent of the energy from glucose metabolism is immediately converted to heat.

Energy homeostasis is an important aspect of bioenergetics.

== Definition ==
In the US, biological energy is expressed using the energy unit Calorie with a capital C (i.e. a kilocalorie), which equals the energy needed to increase the temperature of 1 kilogram of water by 1 °C (about 4.18 kJ).

Energy balance, through biosynthetic reactions, can be measured with the following equation:

Energy intake (from food and fluids) = Energy expended (through work and heat generated) + Change in stored energy (body fat and glycogen storage)

The first law of thermodynamics states that energy can be neither created nor destroyed. But energy can be converted from one form of energy to another. So, when a calorie of food energy is consumed, one of three particular effects occur within the body: a portion of that calorie may be stored as body fat, triglycerides, or glycogen, transferred to cells and converted to chemical energy in the form of adenosine triphosphate (ATP – a coenzyme) or related compounds, or dissipated as heat.

== Energy ==
=== Intake ===
Energy intake is measured by the amount of calories consumed from food and fluids. Energy intake is modulated by hunger, which is primarily regulated by the hypothalamus, and choice, which is determined by the sets of brain structures that are responsible for stimulus control (i.e., operant conditioning and classical conditioning) and cognitive control of eating behavior. Hunger is regulated in part by the action of certain peptide hormones and neuropeptides (e.g., insulin, leptin, ghrelin, and neuropeptide Y, among others) in the hypothalamus.

=== Expenditure ===
Energy expenditure is mainly a sum of internal heat produced and external work. The internal heat produced is, in turn, mainly a sum of basal metabolic rate (BMR) and the thermic effect of food. External work may be estimated by measuring the physical activity level (PAL).

=== Imbalance ===
The Set-Point Theory, first introduced in 1953, postulated that each body has a preprogrammed fixed weight, with regulatory mechanisms to compensate. This theory was quickly adopted and used to explain failures in developing effective and sustained weight loss procedures. A 2019 systematic review of multiple weight change interventions on humans, including dieting, exercise and overeating, found systematic "energetic errors", the non-compensated loss or gain of calories, for all these procedures. This shows that the body cannot precisely compensate for errors in energy/calorie intake, contrary to what the Set-Point Theory hypothesizes, and potentially explaining both weight loss and weight gain such as obesity. This review was conducted on short-term studies, therefore such a mechanism cannot be excluded in the long term, as evidence is currently lacking on this timeframe.

=== Positive balance ===
A positive balance is a result of energy intake being higher than what is consumed in external work and other bodily means of energy expenditure.

The main preventable causes are:

- Overeating, resulting in increased energy intake
- Sedentary lifestyle, resulting in decreased energy expenditure through external work

A positive balance results in energy being stored as fat and/or muscle, causing weight gain. In time, overweight and obesity may develop, with resultant complications.

=== Negative balance ===
A negative balance or caloric deficit is a result of energy intake being less than what is consumed in external work and other bodily means of energy expenditure.

The main cause is undereating due to a medical condition such as decreased appetite, anorexia nervosa, digestive disease, or due to some circumstance such as fasting or lack of access to food. Hyperthyroidism can also be a cause.

=== Requirement ===
Normal energy requirement, and therefore normal energy intake, depends mainly on age, sex and physical activity level (PAL). The Food and Agriculture Organization (FAO) of the United Nations has compiled a detailed report on human energy requirements. An older but commonly used and fairly accurate method is the Harris-Benedict equation.

Yet, there are currently ongoing studies to show if calorie restriction to below normal values have beneficial effects, and even though they are showing positive indications in nonhuman primates it is still not certain if calorie restriction has a positive effect on longevity for humans and other primates. Calorie restriction may be viewed as attaining energy balance at a lower intake and expenditure, and is, in this sense, not generally an energy imbalance, except for an initial imbalance where decreased expenditure hasn't yet matched the decreased intake.

== Society and culture ==
There has been controversy over energy-balance messages that downplay energy intake being promoted by food industry groups.

== See also ==
- Dynamic energy budget
- Earth's energy balance
