= Weight management =

Techniques for maintaining body weight

Nutrition is an important part of maintaining a healthy body weight.

Weight management comprises behaviors, techniques, and physiological processes that contribute to a person's ability to attain and maintain a healthy weight. Most weight management techniques encompass long-term lifestyle strategies that promote healthy eating and daily physical activity. Weight management generally includes tracking weight over time and identifying an individual's ideal body weight.

Weight management strategies most often focus on achieving healthy weights through slow but steady weight loss, followed by maintenance of an ideal body weight. However, weight neutral approaches to health have also been shown to result in positive health outcomes.

Understanding the basic science of weight management and strategies for attaining and maintaining a healthy weight is important because obesity is a risk factor for development of many chronic diseases, like Type 2 diabetes, hypertension and cardiovascular disease.

== Key factors ==
There are many factors that contribute to a person's weight, including: diet, physical activity, genetics, environmental factors, health care support, medications, and illnesses. Each of these factors affects weight in different ways and to varying degrees, but health professionals most often stress the importance of diet and physical activity because they can be affected by conscious behavior modification. Attaining a healthy weight involves recognition of general techniques such as portion sizing, self-monitoring, and daily diet consistency. Once this healthy weight has been attained, maintaining this stable weight additionally involves physical activity and control of an individual's environment and eating patterns. Furthermore, healthcare support in the form of primary care medical supervision and following up over time has been shown to be helpful for long-term weight management.

The following is a review of some of the key components of weight management in humans.

=== Energy balance ===
The science behind weight management is complex, but one of the key concepts that governs weight management is Energy Balance. Energy Balance is the phrase used to describe the difference between the number of calories a person consumes and the number of calories that same person expends (i.e., burns) in a given time period. There are three possible scenarios when it comes to the energy balance equation:

- Calories consumed (food, drink) = Calories expended (basal metabolic rate, physical activity, thermogenic effect of food, acute illness)
  - Outcome: Weight remains unchanged
- Calories consumed > Calories expended
  - Also known as Positive Energy Balance
  - Outcome: Weight increases
- Calories consumed < Calories expended
  - Also known as Negative Energy Balance
  - Outcome: Weight decreases

The calories a person consumes come from food and drink intake. The calories a person expends comes from their basal metabolic rate and their daily physical activity. The human body is very good at maintaining a neutral energy balance, particularly with a diet composed of fruits, vegetables, and meats so that calories consumed do not substantially exceed calories expended in a given time period and vice versa. This energy balance is regulated by hormones like Leptin (suppresses), Ghrelin (stimulates), and Cholecystokinin (suppresses) which either suppress or stimulate appetite.

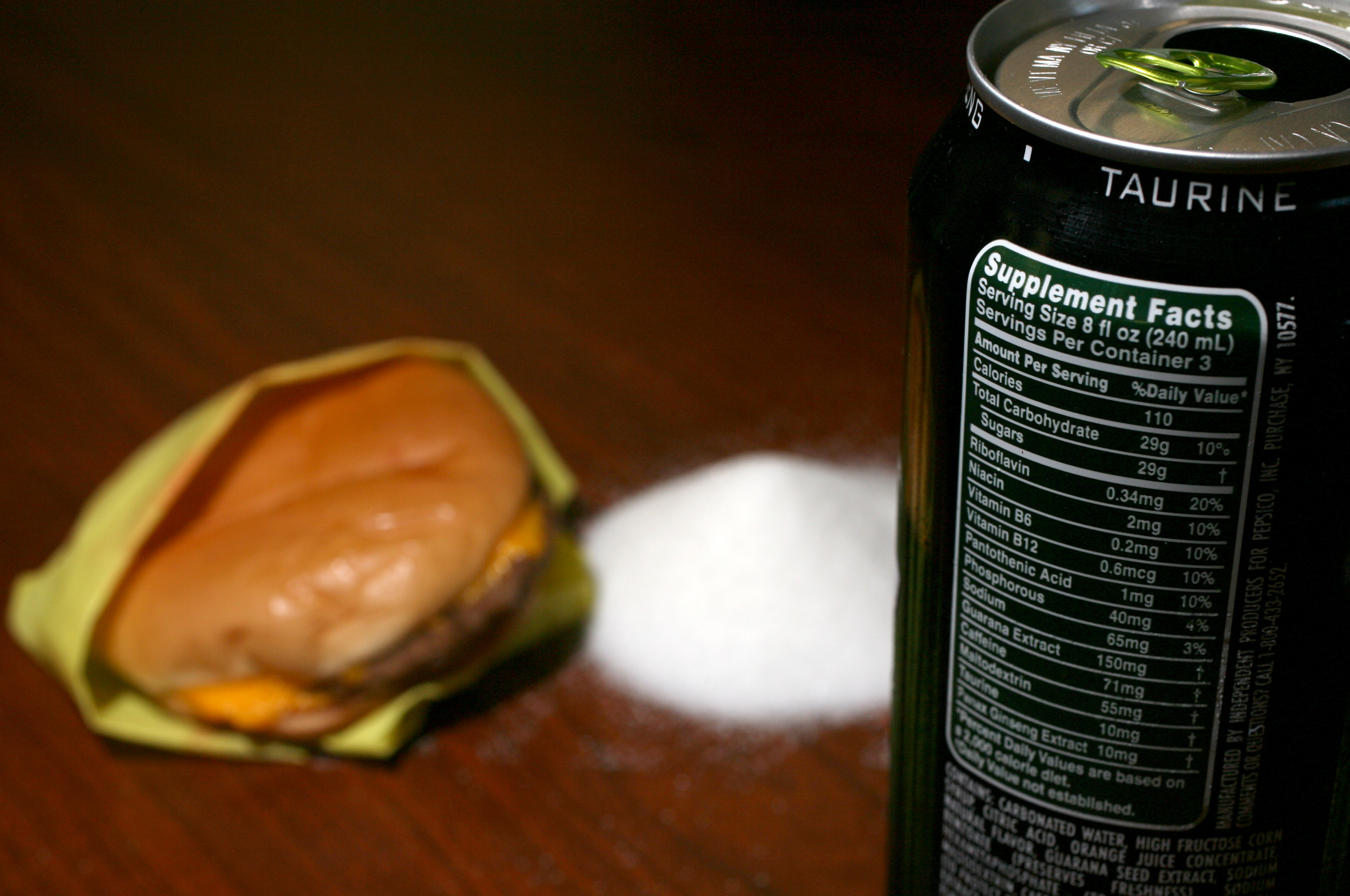
An image that shows nutrition label information including calorie amounts

=== Diet ===
The quantity of food and drink consumed by an individual may play a role in weight management, as may the types of food and drink a person consumes. For example, intake of sweetened drinks such as sodas or juices can lead to increased energy intake that is not neutralized by a decrease in accompanying food intake. Increased portion sizes may also lead to increased energy intake. Food categories such as intake of proteins, carbohydrates, and fats are all important to consider when managing weight. It is also important to have control and understand how certain foods may affect the human body.

=== Physical activity ===
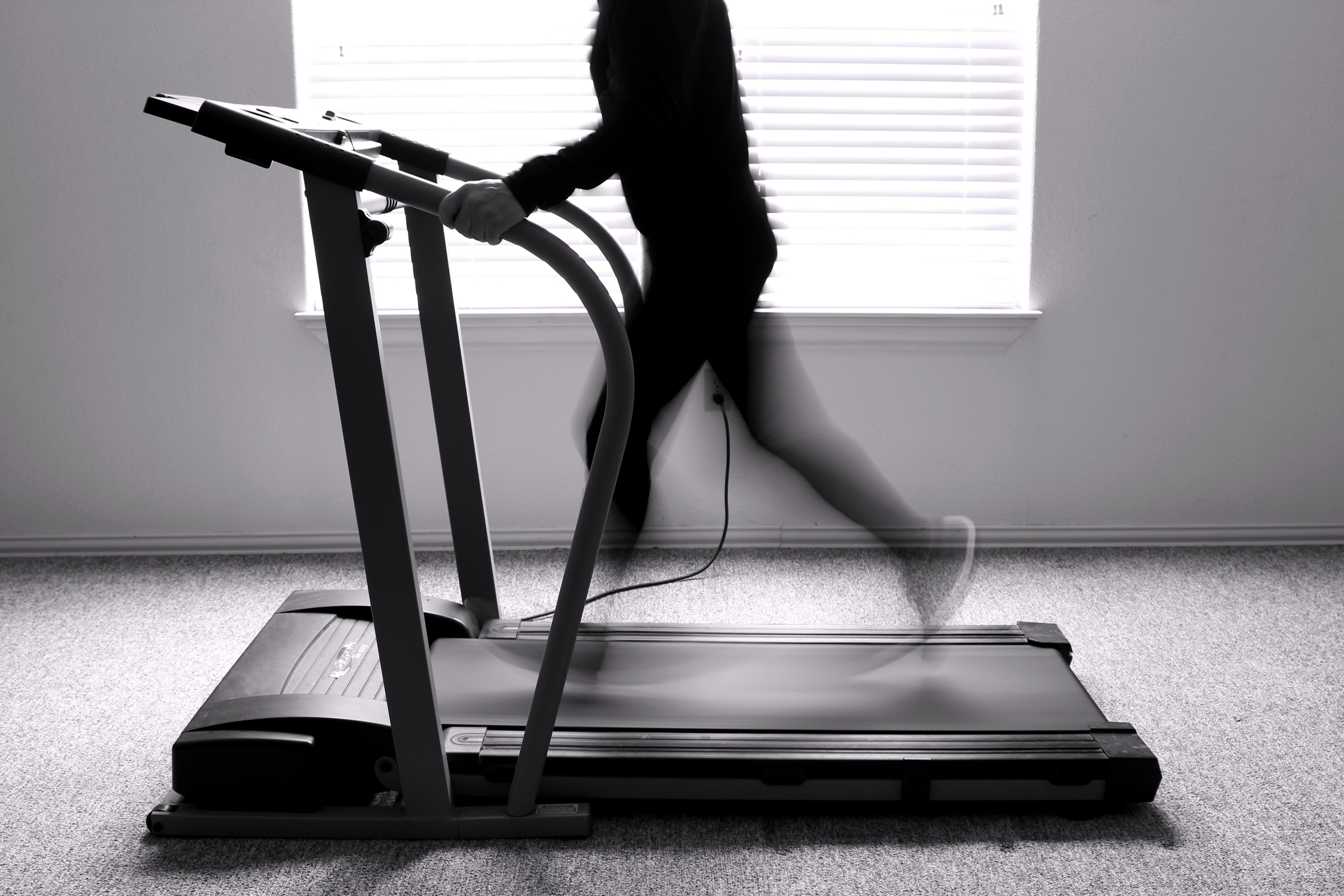
Running on a treadmill is one form of physical activity that can be done at home or at a gym.

Physical activity can be related to a person's professional activities, non-work related daily activities like walking or cycling, or it can be in the form of activities such as recreation or team sports. The specific type of activity can be tailored to populations such as children, pregnant women, and elderly adults. Tailored activity to one's fitness level also encourages the body to heal properly and prevent any injuries as a result of exercise.

Physical inactivity leads to less energy expenditure and is a factor that impacts obesity rates in both children and adults. Physical inactivity has become a worldwide concern since inactivity also elevates the risk of heart disease. With a regular active lifestyle it can reduce the risk for noncommunicable diseases like diabetes, heart disease, and dyslipidemia (high cholesterol). Physical activity not only reduces the risk of noncommunicable diseases, but it also can benefit the body such as improving sleep patterns, reducing both anxiety and depression, and of course, helps weight loss and weight management.

=== Basal metabolic rate ===
Basal metabolic rate (BMR) is one of the main components of a person's daily energy expenditure. It is defined as the amount of energy that is expended during a given amount of time by a person at rest. This energy at rest is used to pump blood throughout the body, maintain proper brain function, break down toxins, and ensure other bodily functions. Technically speaking, BMR is the energy the body expends during the following specific conditions: immediately after waking up, while in a resting state, and after fasting for 12–14 hours. Sometimes the term Resting Metabolic Rate (RMR) is used in place of BMR, but RMR is not solely measured under the previously listed stringent conditions and it is about 10% more than BMR.

The BMR is directly proportional to a person's lean body mass. In other words, the more lean body mass a person has, the higher their BMR. BMR is also affected by acute illnesses and increases with burns, fractures, infections, fevers, etc. It can be measured via direct and indirect calorimetry. However, it is also possible to approximately estimate BMR using several equations that factor in a person's age, sex, height, and weight. Some of the most popular and accurate equations used to calculate BMR are the original Harris-Benedict equations, the revised Harris-Benedict equations, and the Mifflin St. Jeor equation.

The original Harris-Benedict Equations are as follows:

- BMR (Males) in Kcals/day = 66.47 + 13.75 (weight in kg) + 5.0 (height in cm) - 6.76 (age in years)
- BMR (Females) in Kcals/day = 655.1 + 9.56 (weight in kg) + 1.85 (height in cm) – 4.68 (age in years)

The revised Harris-Benedict Equations are as follows:

- BMR (Males) in Kcals/day = 88.36 + 13.40 (weight in kg) + 4.8 (height in cm) – 5.68 (age in years)
- BMR (Females) in Kcals/day = 447.59 + 9.25 (weight in kg) + 3.10 (height in cm) – 4.33 (age in years)

The Mifflin St. Jeor Equation is as follows:

- BMR (Males) in Kcals/day = 9.99 (weight in kg) + 6.25 (height in cm) – 4.92 (age in years) + 5
- BMR (Females) in Kcals/day = 9.99 (weight in kg) + 6.25 (height in cm) – 4.92 (age in years) – 161

The Mifflin St. Jeor Equation has been found to be the most accurate predictor of BMR compared to BMR measured by direct and indirect calorimetry.

=== Body mass index ===
Body mass index (BMI) is a value used to get a general sense of a person's overall mass and is calculated using a person's height and weight. It is more often used than weight alone to determine if an individual is underweight, normal weight, overweight, or obese. The following two equations can used to calculate BMI depending on the units used for height (meters vs. inches) and weight (kilograms vs. pounds):

$\mathrm{BMI} = \frac{\text{weight}_\text{kg}}{{\text{height}_\text{m}}^2}$

or

$\mathrm{BMI} = \frac{\text{weight}_\text{lbs}}{{\text{height}_\text{in}}^2} \times 703$

Though BMI is often used to help assess for excess weight, it is not a perfect representation of a person's body fat percentage. For example, an individual can have a higher than normal BMI but a normal body fat percentage if they have higher than average muscle mass. This is because excess muscle contributes to a higher weight. Since BMI is not a perfect representation of a person's body fat percentage, other measurements like waist circumference are often used to better assess for unhealthy excess weight.

The following table shows how different ranges of BMIs are often categorized into underweight, normal weight, overweight, and obese:

Waist circumference may be used as an alternative method to assess weight.

Classification of Overweight and Obesity by Body Mass Index (BMI)
Category	BMI
Underweight	< 18.5
Normal Weight	18.5 – 24.9
Overweight	25.0 – 29.9
Obesity (Class I)	30.0 – 34.9
Obesity (Class II)	35.0 – 39.9
Obesity (Class III)	≥ 40.0

On average, groups of people with "obese" BMIs may have a higher risk of developing illnesses like diabetes, hypertension, dyslipidemia (high cholesterol), liver disease, and some cancers. "Underweight" BMIs may indicate malnutrition or other health problems. However, BMI has limitations when used to describe individual health rather than describing populations of people.

== Complicating factors ==
=== Thermogenic effect of food ===
The thermogenic effect of food is another component of a person's daily energy expenditure and refers to the amount of energy it takes the body to digest, absorb, and metabolize nutrients in the diet. The amount of energy expended while processing food differs by individual but on average it amounts to about 10% the number of calories consumed during a given time period. Processing proteins and carbohydrates has more of a thermogenic effect than does processing fats.

=== Medications ===
Certain medications can cause either weight loss or weight gain. Side effects are often listed for each medication and should be considered when attempting to manage a person's weight. Semaglutide is an anti-obesity drug that is also used for blood sugar control.

=== Natural supplements ===
There are many different ways to manage weight and maintain a healthy lifestyle. Natural supplements not only help with weight management but taking natural supplements also help to build muscle, provide energy for the human body, and burn fat. Supplements such as magnesium, green tea, caffeine, vitamins, ginger, and turmeric are just a few of the many supplements that can support natural weight loss and burn fat.

=== Unhealthy weight loss ===
Some unhealthy weight loss illnesses can include cancer, diseases such as liver and kidney disease, diabetes, hyperthyroidism, and eating disorders such as anorexia and bulimia. It is important to know the difference between healthy weight loss and unhealthy weight loss.

=== Diseases ===
Medical conditions associated with weight gain include hypothyroidism, Cushing's syndrome, polyendocrine metabolic ovarian syndrome (PMOS), and congestive heart failure. Medical conditions such as cancer, gastrointestinal illness, psychiatric disorders, infections, endocrine disorders, and neurologic disorders may lead to weight loss.

==== Commonly associated with weight gain ====
Polyendocrine metabolic ovarian syndrome (PMOS), which is characterized by insulin resistance and hyperandrogenism, is a common condition that has been linked to obesity. A combination of genetics, lifestyle, and environment appear to contribute to the hormonal changes responsible for weight gain and obesity seen in individuals with PMOS.There appears to be a bidirectional relationship between obesity and PMOS, whereby PMOS increases the risk of obesity and similarly, obesity has been found to exacerbate PMOS hormonal differences and clinical symptoms. Obesity has been linked with pancreatic β-cell dysfunction and insulin resistance. In diabetes, impaired β-islet cells are responsible for the lack of blood glucose control. Individuals with a higher body mass index concerning for obesity may have increased levels of hormones, proinflammatory markers, and glycerol, which can contribute to insulin resistance. The combined effects of impaired pancreatic β-islet cells and insulin resistance increase the likelihood of developing diabetes.

In individuals with blood sugar levels in the prediabetic range, weight loss was demonstrated to have many benefits including improved glycemic control and a reduced risk of developing type 2 diabetes.

==== Commonly associated with weight loss ====
Common gastrointestinal disorders associated with weight loss are malabsorption due to Celiac disease or chronic pancreatitis. Depression and eating disorders such as anorexia nervosa can also contribute to weight loss. Infectious causes of weight loss include HIV/AIDS.

While Type 1 diabetes has been found to cause weight loss, type 2 diabetes has been associated with weight gain. Other endocrine causes of weight loss include hyperthyroidism and chronic adrenal insufficiency.

== Intentional weight loss ==
=== Diets ===
As weight loss depends partly on calorie intake, different kinds of calorie-reduced diets, such as those emphasizing particular macronutrients (low-fat, low-carbohydrate, etc.), have been shown to be equally effective as weight loss tools. Nonetheless, a diet low in saturated fat complemented with high fiber can be helpful for those who are found to be obese based on BMI. A low-carbohydrate diet can have the added benefits of blood sugar control in those with Type 2 Diabetes Mellitus. A low-carbohydrate diet can also improve weight loss, HDL, and cholesterol in certain individuals. Compared to a typical diet, low-carbohydrate, low-fat, and moderate macronutrient diets can all positively impact weight loss. However, weight regain is common, and the outcome of a diet can vary widely depending on the individual. Rather than focusing on the nuances of each diet type, molding one diet in a way that the person can continuously adhere in the long-term could be beneficial for weight loss.

DASH diet

The Dietary Approaches to Stop Hypertension (DASH) diet focuses on increasing the consumption of fruits, vegetables, whole grains and low-fat dairy products. DASH offers an intervention to manage elevated blood pressure and to prevent cardiovascular disease non-pharmacologically. Combining the DASH diet with a reduced sodium intake will further decrease blood pressure, but is not required for therapeutic effect. Indeed, it is effective at a wide range of sodium intake levels. More recent reviews of DASH have continued to advocate its efficacy as an affordable weight loss tool, but stress that diet adherence is key to produce the desired results.

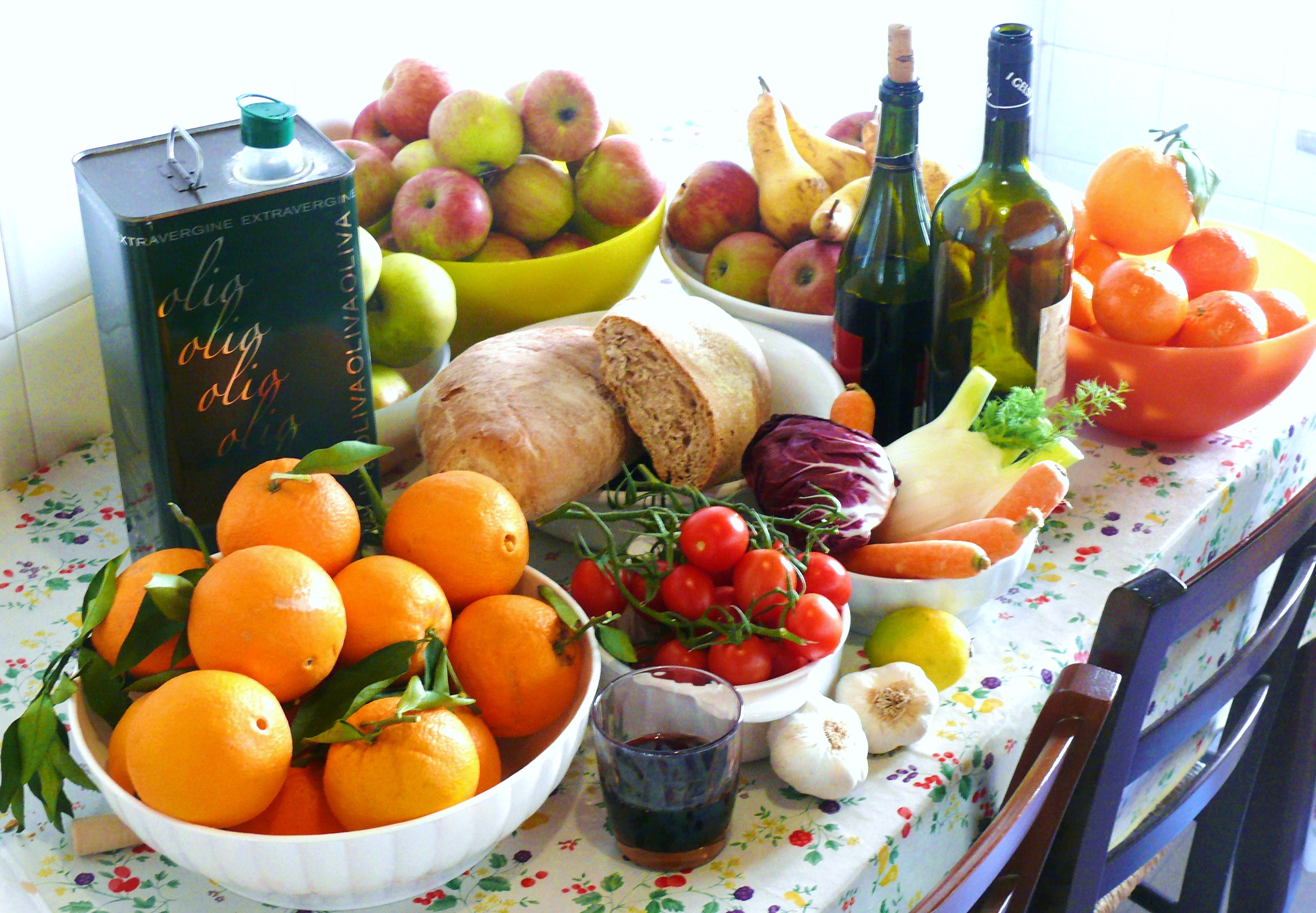
Fruits and vegetables are considered staples of the Mediterranean diet.

Mediterranean diet

The Mediterranean diet involves eating fruits, vegetables, whole grains and beans while replacing butter with extra-virgin olive oil and limiting red meats, dairy, sweets, and processed foods. It is effective for long term weight loss with added cardiovascular health benefits. For example, the Mediterranean diet can lead to decreased triglyceride and lipid levels as well as improved blood pressure readings. It can also improve blood sugar levels in those diagnosed with Type 2 Diabetes Mellitus.

Ketogenic diet

The ketogenic or "keto" diet involves intake of less than 50 g of carbohydrates daily along with increased fat and protein amounts. One type of ketogenic or low carbohydrate diet is the "Atkins" Diet, which does not restrict protein and fat amounts. Other ketogenic diets restrict the total amount of daily proteins and fats.

Plant-based diet

The plant-based diet is largely based on consumption of beans, grains, fruits, and vegetables and removal of meat, fish, and occasionally dairy and egg products from intake. In other words, fiber and unsaturated fat intake is increased and consumption of higher calorie meats and saturated fats is decreased. This diet has been shown to reduce BMI and introduce positive body composition changes when compared to a carnivore diet. Plant-based diets provide a lot of fiber in the meals which allows the body to lose weight and keep that weight off. Removing fried foods such as french fries, donuts, potato chips, and fried chicken, and sticking to an all plant-based diet comes with a lot of positive and healthy benefits.

Intermittent fasting

Intermittent fasting (IF) involves consistent fasting blocks of time where fewer or no calories are consumed. Intermittent fasting has been shown to improve fasting blood glucose levels and insulin resistance with a concurrent reduction in BMI.

=== Strategies ===
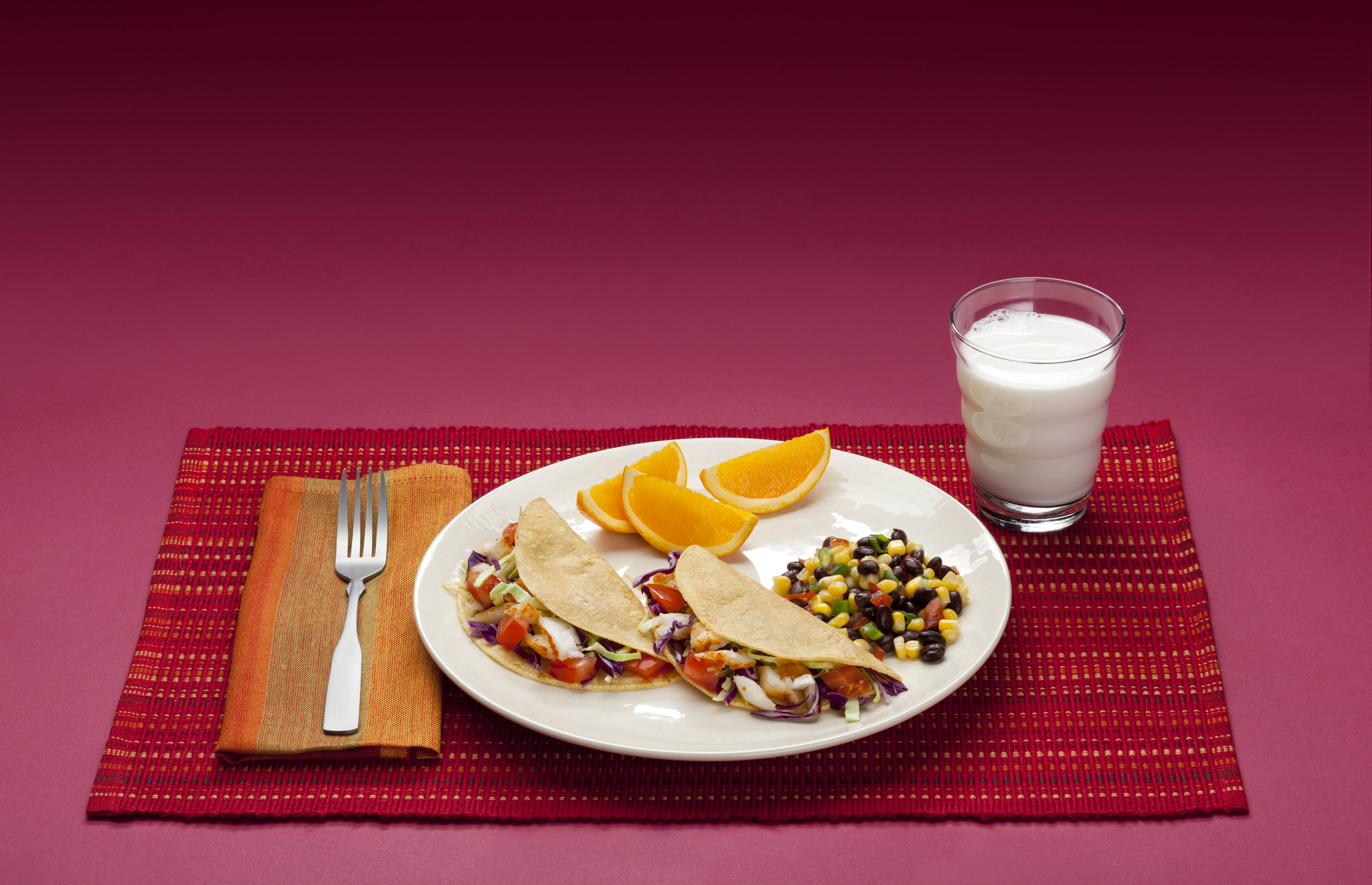
A dinner example of portion sizes relative to food groups

==== Modifying plate size ====
Some studies have suggested that using smaller plates might help people to consume smaller portion sizes.

Modifying portion sizes may impact energy intake. Those who are presented with larger portion sizes do not report to have high levels of satiety. In other words, hunger and satiety signals could be ignored with large portion sizes. In a study focused on portion sizes, participants consumed 31% less calories with the small portion sized of a 6-inch submarine sandwich compared with the large portion size of a 12-inch submarine sandwich. Increased portions have occurred simultaneously with the increase in obesity rates. Large portion sizes could be one of the factors contributing to the current increase in average body weight in the US. Evidence from a systematic review of 72 randomized controlled trials indicates that people consistently eat more food when offered larger portion, package, or tableware sizes as opposed to smaller size alternatives.

==== Choosing low-calorie foods ====
The majority of guidelines agree that a calorie deficit, particularly 500-750 kcal daily, can be recommended to those who want to lose weight. A moderate decrease in caloric intake will lead to a slow weight loss, which is often more beneficial than a rapid weight loss for long term weight management. For example, low fat meats reduce the total amount of calories and cholesterol consumed.

==== Increasing protein intake ====
A high protein diet relative to a low-fat or high-carbohydrate diet may increase thermogenesis and decrease appetite leading to weight reduction, particularly 3-6 months into a diet when rapid weight loss is observed. However, these advantages may be reduced later at 12–24 months into a diet during the slow weight loss phase.

==== Eating more soup ====
Studies have demonstrated that when compared to solid foods, soup ingestion decreases the amount of energy intake and increases feelings of satiety. When soup is consumed before a meal, there is a 20% decrease in the number of calories consumed during said meal.

==== Eating more dairy ====
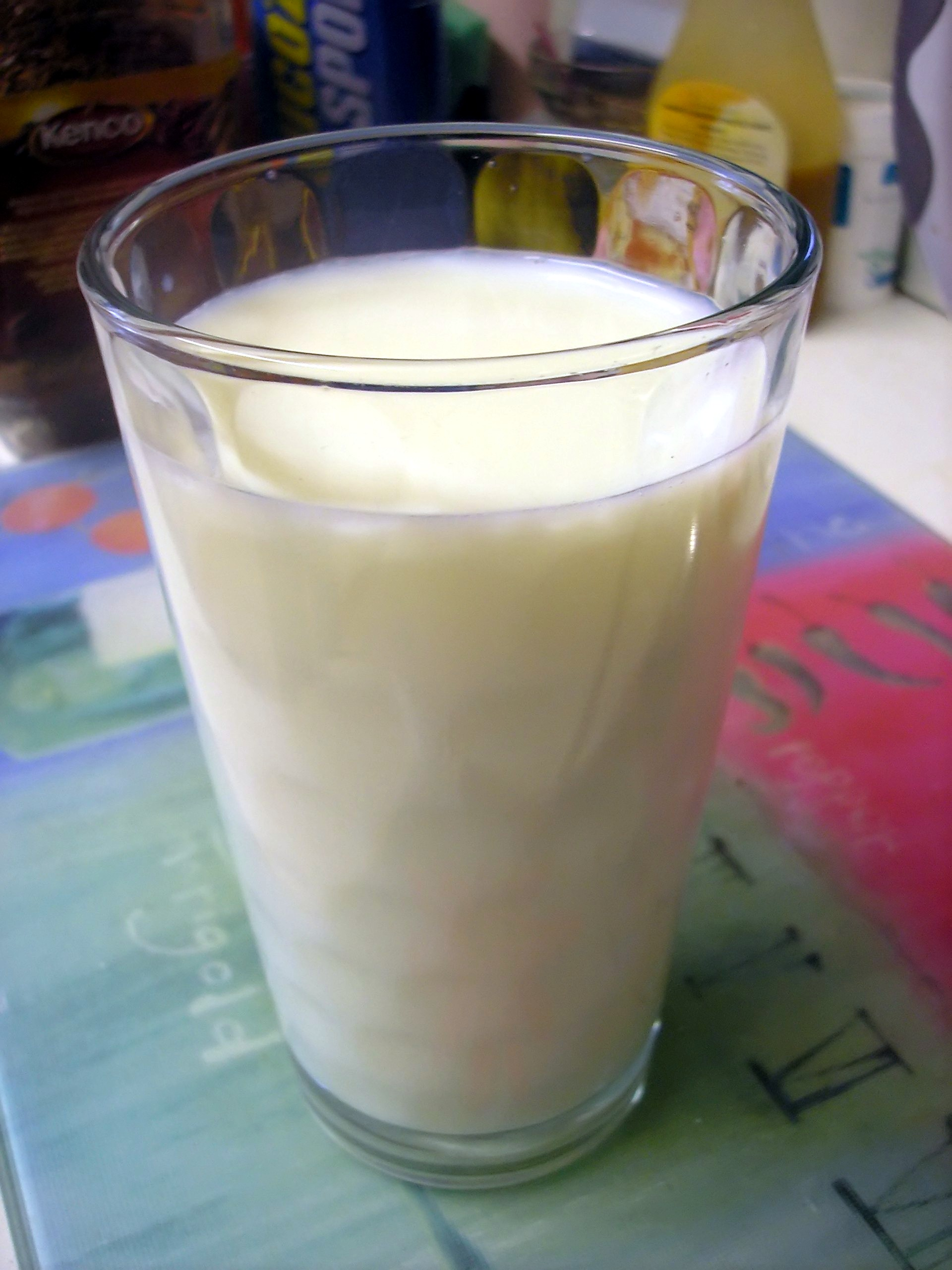
Milk intake has been advocated as a weight loss strategy due to its calcium and other nutrients.

Studies have shown that a diet high in dairy decreases total body fat. This occurs because a high amount of dietary calcium increases the amount of energy and fat excreted from the body. Other studies have noted that dairy sources of calcium lead to greater weight loss than supplemental calcium intake. This could be due to the bioactive components of dairy sources, especially when combined with a lower calorie diet. Since most natural dairy products contain fat content, there is a common understanding that this may cause weight gain. However, dairy contains ingredients such as whey protein and certain combinations of protein/calcium nutrients that induce a positive effect on satiety, increase energy loss, and assists weight loss.

==== Eating more vegetables ====
Fruits and vegetables have been shown to increase satiety and decrease hunger signals. These food groups have a low energy density, mainly due to the high water content and partly due to the fiber content. The reduction of energy density has been shown to enhance satiety. The water content adds satisfying weight without excess calories and fiber slows gastric emptying. Studies have also shown that fiber decreases hunger and also decreases total energy intake.

==== Increasing fiber intake ====
Fruits and vegetables are two sources of fiber as discussed above. Dietary fiber has been suggested to aid weight management by inducing satiety, decreasing absorption of macronutrients and promoting secretion of gut hormones. Dietary fiber consists of non-digestible carbohydrates and lignin, which are a structural component in plants.

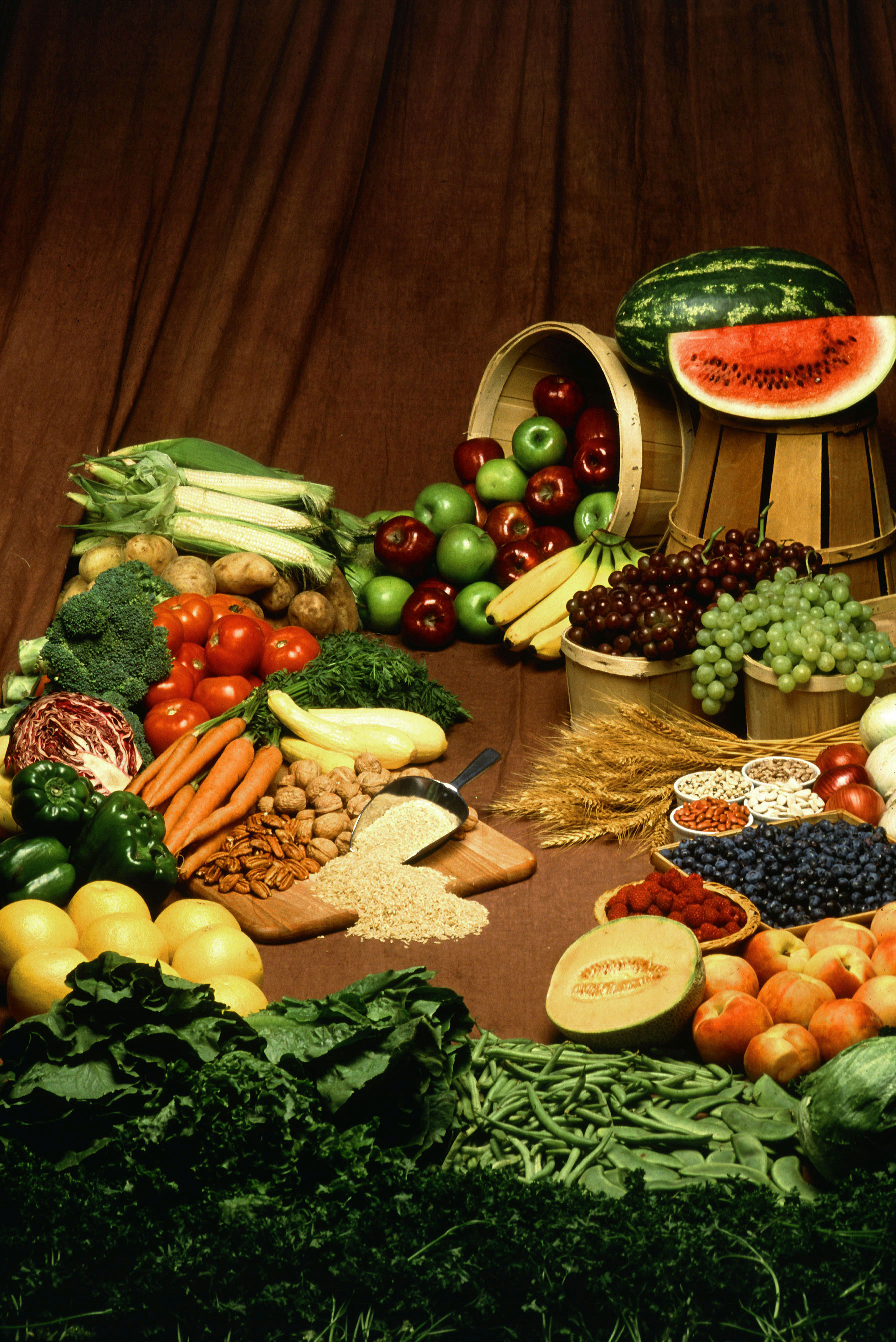
Fruits and vegetables contain fiber which has been shown to improve satiety and help with weight loss.

Due to the high volume or water content of fiber-rich foods, fiber displaces available calories and nutrients from the diet. Consumption of viscous fibers delays gastric emptying, which may cause an extended feeling of fullness. Satiety is also induced by increasing chewing, which limits food intake by promoting the secretion of saliva and gastric juice, resulting in an expansion of the stomach. In addition, hormone secretion is affected during fiber ingestion. Insulin response is reduced and cholecystokinin (CCK) in the small intestine is increased. Insulin regulates blood glucose levels while CCK adjusts gastric emptying, pancreatic secretion, and gall bladder contraction. There is a direct correlation between CCK and satiety after foods of different fiber contents are consumed.

In general, large intakes of dietary fiber at breakfast have been associated with less food intake at lunchtime. Fiber may have the added benefit of helping consumers reduce food intake throughout the day, but results of studies examining this possibility have been conflicting.

==== Increasing resistant starch intake ====
Resistant starch is a type of non-digestible, fermentable fiber resistant to amylase digestion in the small intestine. It is broken down to short-chain fatty acids by microflora in the large intestine. It is commonly found in cooked and cooled potatoes, green bananas, beans and legumes. The short chain fatty acids can lead to further oxidation of fat and a higher energy expenditure. Resistant starch dilutes energy density of food intake, maintains a bulking effect similar to non-fermentable fiber, and increases the expression of gut hormones PYY and GLP-1. The increase in gut hormone expression affects neuronal pathways in the brain that contribute to long-term energy balance and improved overall health of the intestines.

==== Increasing caffeine intake ====
Caffeine and black coffee have been associated with increased energy expenditure and subsequent weight loss. Caffeine belongs to a class of compounds called methylxanthines and is present in coffee, tea, cocoa, chocolate and some cola drinks. Caffeine induces a thermogenic effect in the body by increasing sympathetic nervous system activity, which is an important regulator of energy expenditure.

==== Increasing green tea intake ====
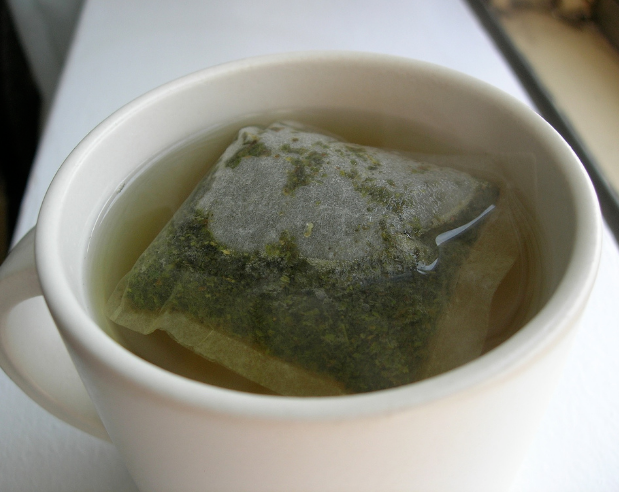
Green tea contains catechins that may aid weight loss.

Catechins are polyphenols that are a major component of green tea extract. Green tea has been associated with decreasing blood glucose, inhibiting hepatic and body fat accumulation, and stimulating thermogenesis due to the catechins present in formulations. Moreover, catechins in the brain play a major role in satiety. Independent of the caffeine content, green tea has also been shown to increase energy expenditure and fat oxidation in humans.

While green tea intake alone may not significantly reduce weight or BMI, combining intake with other strategies aimed at weight loss could be helpful for both loss and weight maintenance.

Adjunctive Lifestyle Therapies:

Emerging evidence suggests that integrating medical weight loss treatments with structured lifestyle interventions—such as personalized nutrition, physical activity plans, and psychological support—enhances long-term outcomes. Studies indicate that combining pharmacotherapy with behavioral counseling can lead to significantly greater weight reduction and maintenance compared to medication alone Adjunctive Lifestyle Therapies:

Emerging evidence suggests that integrating medical weight loss treatments with structured lifestyle interventions—such as personalized nutrition, physical activity plans, and psychological support—enhances long-term outcomes. Studies indicate that combining pharmacotherapy with behavioral counseling can lead to significantly greater weight reduction and maintenance compared to medication alone.

== See also ==
- Anti-obesity medication
- Dieting
- Nutrigenomics
- Nutrition
- Weight loss
- Weight gain
- Orthorexia
