= Institute of Medicine Equation =

The Institute of Medicine Equation was published in September 2002. It is the equation which is behind the 2005 Dietary Guidelines for Americans and the new food pyramid, MyPyramid.

The Institute of Medicine equation uses a different approach to most others. The equation doesn't measure basal metabolic rate, but uses experiments based on doubly labelled water. The scientists at the Institute of Medicine said in their report that the factorial method tended to underestimate calorie expenditure.

== Equations ==
The Estimated Energy Requirement, $\text{EER}$, is the estimated number of daily kilocalories, or Calories, an individual requires in order to maintain his or her current weight. For a person with a body mass of $m$ (kg), height of $h$ (m), age of $a$ (years) and Physical Activity $\text{PA}$, this is given by

- Adult Men: $\text{EER}=662-(9.53 \times a)+ \text{PA} \times ((15.91 \times m)+(539.6 \times h))$
- Adult Women: $\text{EER}=354-(6.91 \times a)+\text{PA}\times ((9.36 \times m)+(726 \times h))$
- Boys Age 3-18: $\text{EER}=88.5-(61.9 \times a)+\text{PA} \times ((26.7 \times m)+(903 \times h))$
- Girls Age 3-18: $\text{EER}=135.3-(30.8 \times a)+\text{PA}\times ((10 \times m)+(934 \times h))$
- Toddlers aged 2: $\text{EER}=89 \times m-80$

These equations are for healthy weight children and adults. Correction formulae are used for overweight and obese individuals. These corrections for children and adolescents have been debated by S. J. Woodruff, R. M. Hanning, and S. I. Barr in a paper in Obesity Reviews published January 1, 2009. The issue is whether or not the different formulae are actually necessary or possibly even harmful if overestimate occurs and thus contributes to an even higher and unhealthier body weight in these individuals. However, they are as follows:

- Obese Girls Age 3-18: $\text{EER}=389-(41.2 \times a)+\text{PA}\times ((15.0 \times m)+(701.6 \times h))$
- Obese Boys Age 3-18: $\text{EER}=-114-(50.9 \times a)+\text{PA}\times ((19.5 \times m)+(1161.4 \times h))$

$\text{PA}$ is the Physical Activity coefficient. The activity coefficients are tabulated below:

Activity Level	Boys aged 3–18	Obese boys aged 3–18	Girls aged 3–18	Obese girls aged 3–18	Adult men	Adult women
Sedentary	1	1	1	1	1	1
Moderately Active	1.13	1.12	1.16	1.18	1.11	1.12
Active	1.26	1.24	1.31	1.35	1.25	1.27
Very Active	1.42	1.45	1.56	1.6	1.48	1.45

Sedentary means only the light physical activity associated with independent living, moderately active means about half an hour of moderate to vigorous exercise in addition to this. Active means at least an hour of exercise and very active means being physically active for several hours each day.

== See also ==
- Harris–Benedict equation
- Schofield equation
