= Biological thermodynamics =

Study of energy in living systems

Biological thermodynamics (Thermodynamics of biological systems) is a science that explains the nature and general laws of thermodynamic processes occurring in living organisms as nonequilibrium thermodynamic systems that convert the energy of the Sun and food into other types of energy. The nonequilibrium thermodynamic state of living organisms is ensured by the continuous alternation of cycles of controlled biochemical reactions, accompanied by the release and absorption of energy, which provides them with the properties of phenotypic adaptation and a number of others.

== History ==
In 1935, the first scientific work devoted to the thermodynamics of biological systems was published - the book of the Hungarian-Russian theoretical biologist Erwin S. Bauer (1890-1938) "Theoretical Biology". E. Bauer formulated the "Universal Law of Biology" in the following edition: "All and only living systems are never in equilibrium and perform constant work at the expense of their free energy against the equilibrium required by the laws of physics and chemistry under existing external conditions". This law can be considered the 1st law of thermodynamics of biological systems.

In 1957, German-British physician and biochemist Hans Krebs and British-American biochemist Hans Kornberg in the book "Energy Transformations in Living Matter" first described the thermodynamics of biochemical reactions. In their works, H. Krebs and Hans Kornberg showed how in living cells, as a result of biochemical reactions, adenosine triphosphate (ATP) is synthesized from food, which is the main source of energy of living organisms (the Krebs–Kornberg cycle).

In 2006, the Israeli-Russian scientist Boris Dobroborsky (1945) published the book "Thermodynamics of Biological Systems", in which the general principles of functioning of living organisms from the perspective of nonequilibrium thermodynamics were formulated for the first time and the nature and properties of their basic physiological functions were explained.

== The main provisions of the theory of thermodynamics of biological systems ==
A living organism is a thermodynamic system of an active type (in which energy transformations occur), striving for a stable nonequilibrium thermodynamic state. The nonequilibrium thermodynamic state in plants is achieved by continuous alternation of phases of solar energy consumption as a result of photosynthesis and subsequent biochemical reactions, as a result of which adenosine triphosphate (ATP) is synthesized in the daytime, and the subsequent release of energy during the splitting of ATP mainly in the dark. Thus, one of the conditions for the existence of life on Earth is the alternation of light and dark time of day.

In animals, the processes of alternating cycles of biochemical reactions of ATP synthesis and cleavage occur automatically. Moreover, the processes of alternating cycles of biochemical reactions at the levels of organs, systems and the whole organism, for example, respiration, heart contractions and others occur with different periods and externally manifest themselves in the form of biorhythms. At the same time, the stability of the nonequilibrium thermodynamic state, optimal under certain conditions of vital activity, is provided by feedback systems through the regulation of biochemical reactions in accordance with the Lyapunov stability theory. This principle of vital activity was formulated by B. Dobroborsky in the form of the 2nd law of thermodynamics of biological systems in the following wording:

The stability of the nonequilibrium thermodynamic state of biological systems is ensured by the continuous alternation of phases of energy consumption and release through controlled reactions of synthesis and cleavage of ATP.

The following consequences follow from this law:

1. In living organisms, no process can occur continuously, but must alternate with the opposite direction: inhalation with exhalation, work with rest, wakefulness with sleep, synthesis with cleavage, etc.

2. The state of a living organism is never static, and all its physiological and energy parameters are always in a state of continuous fluctuations relative to the average values both in frequency and amplitude.

This principle of functioning of living organisms provides them with the properties of phenotypic adaptation and a number of others.

== See also ==
- Bioenergetics
- Ecological energetics
- Basal metabolic rate
- Harris-Benedict Equations
- Stress (biology)
