= System for Observing Play and Recreation in Communities =

A System for Observing Play and Recreation in Communities (SOPARC) is a reliable and valid observation tool for assessing park and recreation areas, including park users’ physical activity levels, gender, age, and ethnicity groupings. It also collects information on park characteristics including accessibility, usability, supervision, and organization. The use of SOPARC in park monitoring would allow for more consistent and comprehensive monitoring of parks. The summary data (e.g. the number of park users, demographics, frequency by activity types) obtained using SOPARC is easily understood by practitioners, policymakers, and the public. SOPARC has been adapted to numerous studies to understand the role of park conditions on park use, compare park data, and inform park system planning and programming.

Traditionally, the park use patterns have been studied by direct observation - either in person or video recording. Compared to survey or interview of park users, the strength of direct observation is that it allows for the collection of data on large numbers of people in a relatively short period without placing a burden on participants. The observational method entailing the observation and description of subjects' behavior is a systematic investigation in behavioral science.

== Background ==
Dr. Thomas L. McKenzie, an Emeritus Professor of Exercise and Nutritional Sciences at San Diego State University, and his research team have developed several systematic observation tools for assessing physical activity in various contexts. In chronological order, they are (a) System for Observing Fitness Instruction Time (SOFIT), (b) Behaviors of Eating and Activity for Children's Health: Evaluation System (BEACHES), (c) System for Observing Play and Leisure in Youth (SOPLAY), (d) System for Observing Play and Active Recreation in Communities (SOPARC), (f) System for Observing Children's Activity and Relationships during Play (SOCARP), and (g) System for Observing Physical Activity and Recreation in Natural Areas (SOPARNA). These instruments deal with physical education lessons (SOFIT), homes (BEACHES), schools (SOPLAY), parks (SOPARC), playgrounds (SOCARP), and natural areas (SOPARNA).

The focus of these six systematic observation tools is physical activity. Dr. McKenzie and his team argue the primary advantages of systematic observation over other methods of assessing physical activity (e.g., self-reports, accelerometers, pedometers, heart rate monitoring, doubly labeled water) are that it is a direct method and it allows for the simultaneous generation of information on both the physical environment and social environment. Thus, systematic observation is especially appealing when a researcher tries to understand the impacts of environmental interventions on physical activity.

The original SOFIT instrument measured five levels of physical activity – lying down, sitting, standing, walking, and very active. Based on subsequent validation work (e.g., Rowe et al., 2004), the first three categories have been merged into a single category (i.e., sedentary) because of their similarity in energy expenditure, and thus, the recent instruments including SOPARC use three categories – sedentary (i.e., lying down, sitting, or standing), moderate (e.g., walking, shifting weight from foot to foot), and vigorous (i.e., intensity greater than a walk).

== Methodology ==
SOPARC, like the other six tools developed by Dr. McKenzie's team, uses ‘momentary time sampling techniques’ in which systematic and periodic scans of individuals and contextual factors within pre-determined target areas in the context are made. During an area scan (i.e., an observation sweeping from left to right), the activity of the individual is coded as sedentary, moderate, or vigorous. Summary counts describe the number of users by gender, age, and race/ethnicity. The protocol, data coding form, mapping strategies, and other information for conducting SOPARC is available online. A free 27-minute SOPLAY/SOPARC Introduction, Practice, and Assessment Training DVD is available from Active Living Research. The electronic download is available to download as a form of iTunes podcasts.

Observations can be recorded on either paper or electronic software. The digital methods are more recommended as software can be developed that can instantly summarize the data as it is entered. An iPad-only application, iSOPARC, is developed by CIAFEL, a research center at the University of Porto, with the contribution of Dr.McKenzie, the original developer of SOPARC. The iSOPARC is an application that implements the SOPARC protocol to generate park use data from the field and to store, process and export it. Main features of iSOPARC are a digital counter, target area mapping, project-based data management, and data export. The app is free and available from Apple app store. Other than iSOPARC, RAND had provided a free application available online that can be used by observers with an Internet connection but has been discontinued.

== Applications ==
=== Monitoring of park environment and park uses ===
Considering its multiple benefits to society and nature, an urban park is a crucial place for promoting physical activity. However, the monitoring of park condition and park uses has not been standardized and popularized, which results in only a few cities monitoring park uses. The use of SOPARC in park monitoring would allow for more consistent and comprehensive monitoring of parks. The summary data (e.g. the number of park users, demographics, frequency by activity types) obtained using SOPARC is easily understood by practitioners, policymakers, and the public. Also, the development of an electronic data collection tool such as iSOPARC now enables researchers to enter, store, and analyze data more easily.

Especially for public health perspective, the SOPARC could measure the level of physical activity occurring in a park, which then could calculate energy expenditure estimates for a park. Existing studies have measured total metabolic equivalents (METs) per park per day using the data generated from the SOPARC observations. One MET-hour is the energy expended at rest for one hour. Based on measures of energy expenditure, sedentary behavior is roughly the equivalent of 1.5 METs, moderate physical activity is 3 METs, and vigorous activity 6 METs. To estimate how much physical activity a park generates, it is possible to aggregate the total METs across park users. Quantifying the total number of park users and MET-hours expended in a park creates a benchmark to assess performance in the future or to compare park services within and across jurisdictions.

=== Research on park use or park-based physical activity ===
As of September 6, 2016, the author could find 312 articles in Google Scholar using the search term, “System for Observing Play and Recreation in Communities.” In a review paper of 34 articles using SOPARC, Evenson et al.(2016) find that "there was a wide range of park users (mean 1.0 to 152.6 people/park/observation period), with typically more males than females visiting parks and older adults less than other age groups." Also, they show that "park user physical activity levels varied greatly across studies, with youths generally more active than adults and younger children more active than adolescents."
