= Schofield equation =

Equation for estimating daily calorie needs

The Schofield Equation is a method of estimating the basal metabolic rate (BMR) of adult men and women published in 1985.

This is the equation used by the WHO in their technical report series. The equation that is recommended to estimate BMR by the US Academy of Nutrition and Dietetics is the Mifflin-St. Jeor equation.

The equations for estimating BMR in kJ/day (kilojoules per day) from the body mass W (kg) are:

Men:

Age	Equation (kJ/day)	SEE
< 3	249 × W - 127	292
3–10	95 × W + 2110	280
10–18	74 × W + 2754	441
18–30	63 × W + 2896	641
30–60	48 × W + 3653	700
> 60	49 × W + 2459	686

Women:

Age	Equation (kJ/day)	SEE
< 3	244 × W - 130	246
3–10	85 × W + 2033	292
10–18	56 × W + 2898	466
18–30	62 × W + 2036	497
30–60	34 × W + 3538	465
> 60	38 × W + 2755	451

The equations for estimating BMR in kcal/day (kilocalories per day) from body mass (kg) are:

Men:

Age	Equation (kcal/day)	SEE
< 3	59.512 × W - 30.4	70
3–10	22.706 × W + 504.3	67
10–18	17.686 × W + 658.2	105
18–30	15.057 × W + 692.2	153
30–60	11.472 × W + 873.1	167
> 60	11.711 × W + 587.7	164

Women:

Age	Equation (kcal/day)	SEE
< 3	58.317 × W - 31.1	59
3–10	20.315 × W + 485.9	70
10–18	13.384 × W + 692.6	111
18–30	14.818 × W + 486.6	119
30–60	8.126 × W + 845.6	111
> 60	9.082 × W + 658.5	108

Key:

W = Body weight in kilograms

SEE = Standard error of estimation

The raw figure obtained by the equation should be adjusted up or downwards, within the confidence limit suggested by the quoted estimation errors, and according to the following principles:

Subjects leaner and more muscular than usual require more energy than the average. Obese subjects require less. Patients at the young end of the age range for a given equation require more energy. Patients at the high end of the age range for a given equation require less energy.

Effects of age and body mass may cancel out: an obese 30-year-old or an athletic 60-year-old may need no adjustment from the raw figure.

== Physical activity levels ==
To find total body energy expenditure (actual energy needed per day), the base metabolism must then be multiplied by a physical activity level factor. These are as follows:

Activity	Male	Female	Description
Sedentary	1.3	1.3	Very physically inactive, inactive in both work and leisure.
Lightly active	1.6	1.5	Daily routine includes some walking, or intense exercise once or twice per week. Most students are in this category.
Moderate activity	1.7	1.6	Intense exercise lasting 20–45 minutes at least three time per week, or a job with a lot of walking, or a moderate intensity job.
Very active	2.1	1.9	Intense exercise lasting at least an hour per day, or a heavy physical job, such as a mail carrier or an athlete in training.
Extremely active	2.4	2.2	Extremely active means an athlete on an unstoppable training schedule or a very demanding job, such as working in the armed forces or shoveling coal.

The FAO/WHO uses different PALs in their recommendations when recommending how to calculate TEE. See Table 5.3 of their working document. Energy Requirements of Adults, Report of a Joint FAO/WHO/UNU Expert Consultation.

These equations were published in 1989 in the dietary guidelines and formed the RDA's for a number of years. The activity factor used by the USDA was 1.6. In the UK, a lower activity factor of 1.4 is used. The equation has now been replaced by the Institute of Medicine Equation in September 2002 in the US, however is still currently used by the FAO/WHO/UNU.

== See also ==
- Harris–Benedict equation
- Institute of Medicine Equation
