= Caloric deficit =

Consumption of less calories than expended

A caloric deficit (also known as calorie deficit, in British English calorific deficit) is any shortage in the number of calories consumed relative to the number of calories needed for maintenance of current body weight (energy homeostasis).

A deficit can be created by decreasing calories consumed by lower food intake, such as by swapping high-calorie foods for lower calorie options or by reducing portion sizes. A deficit can also be created by increasing output (burning calories) without a corresponding increase in input. Increased output is created by increasing physical activity, from increased caloric requirements necessary to heal an injury, or from growth. Studies show that combining aerobic exercise with a hypocaloric diet is best for weight loss. There are also some substances, including caffeine, which can create a small (3-5%) increase in caloric expenditure, via a variety of pathways that include increasing physical activity levels and increasing thermogenesis (heat output), and/or by reducing caloric input via appetite suppression. Drugs and herbal treatments creating a more extreme metabolic effect exist; however, they cause extreme increases of heart rate and thermogenesis that can cause death in even very healthy and athletic individuals, and these drugs are not widely sold.

As the calories required for energy homeostasis decreases as the organism's mass decreases, if a moderate deficit is maintained eventually a new (lower) weight will be reached and maintained, and the organism will no longer be at caloric deficit. A permanent severe deficit, on the other hand, which contains too few calories to maintain a healthy weight level, will eventually result in starvation and death.

To reduce 1 kg (2.2 lbs) of weight, about 7000 kcal deficit is required. On the other hand, for weight maintenance, guidelines have suggested a range of 1,600 to 2,400 calories for women and 2,200 to 3,000 for men. Anything below this range is considered a low-calorie diet, which is designed to create caloric deficits.

== See also ==
- Calorie restriction
- Weight loss
- Diet
- Nutrition
- Exercise
