= DLW =

DLW can stand for:

- the Delaware, Lackawanna and Western Railroad in the United States
- the Delhi Waveriders, a field hockey franchise based in Delhi
- Doubly labeled water, water made of uncommon isotopes, used for tracing purposes
- Deutsch Land Wirtschaft (German Land Economy), a political party in Germany
