= Physical activity level =

Way of expressing a person's daily physical activity

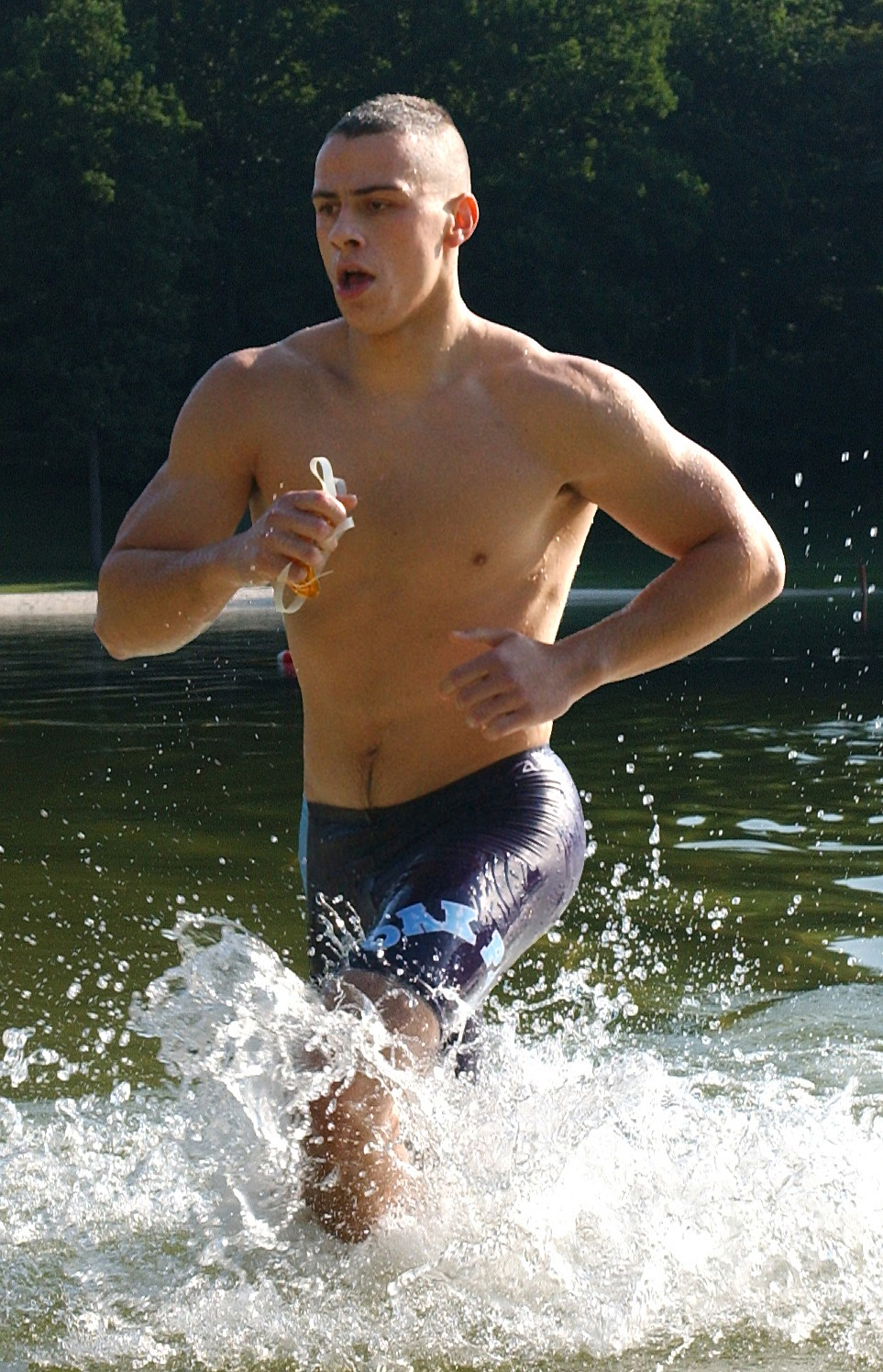
United States Marine triathlete in 2005.

The physical activity level (PAL) is a way to express a person's daily physical activity as a number and is used to estimate their energy expenditure. In combination with the basal metabolic rate (BMR), it can be used to compute the amount of food energy a person needs to consume to maintain a particular lifestyle.

== Definition ==
The physical activity level is defined for a non-pregnant, non-lactating adult as that person's total energy expenditure (TEE) in a 24-hour period, divided by his or her basal metabolic rate (BMR):

$$\text{PAL}=\frac{TEE_{24h}}{\text{BMR}}$$

The level of physical activity can also be estimated based on a list of the physical activities a person performs from day to day. Each activity is connected to a number, the physical activity ratio. The physical activity level is then the time-weighted average of the physical activity ratios.

== Examples ==
The following table shows indicative numbers for the Physical activity level for several lifestyles:

Lifestyle	Example	PAL
Extremely inactive	Cerebral palsy patient	<1.40
Sedentary	Office worker getting little or no exercise	1.40-1.69
Moderately active	Construction worker or person running one hour daily	1.70-1.99
Vigorously active	Agricultural worker (non mechanized) or person swimming two hours daily	2.00-2.4
Extremely active	Competitive cyclist	>2.40

== See also ==
- Schofield equation
