= Dale Schoeller =

- Occupation: Biomedical physiologist

Dale A. Schoeller is an American biomedical physiologist based at the University of Wisconsin in Madison.

== Work ==
Schoeller's main work involves the measurement of human energy demands using a technique known as the doubly labeled water method.

The doubly labeled water method was invented in the 1950s by Lifson and colleagues at the University of Minnesota. It permits measurement of energy demands of subjects unencumbered by the traditional apparatus necessary to measure gas exchange. The cost of oxygen-18 isotope however precluded its use to all but small animals. Advances in isotope ratio mass spectrometry in the late 1970s however brought studies of humans within the range of financial feasibility.

Schoeller was the first person to apply the method to human subjects. He made seminal contributions to the development of the methodology for human applications throughout the 1980s and remains one of the world's foremost authorities in its use.
