= Carl Otto Rosendahl =

Botanist (1875–1956)

- Born: 1875
- Died: 1956 (aged 80–81)
- Education: University of Minnesota
- Scientific career
- Fields: Botany, mycology
- Doctoral students: Arthur Cronquist
- Author abbrev. (botany): Rosend.

Carl Otto Rosendahl (1875–1956) was a botanist, whose areas of interest were mycology and spermatophytes. He both preceded and succeeded James Arthur Harris (1880–1930) as Head of the Department of Botany at the University of Minnesota.

Arthur Cronquist (1919–1992), a botanist known for the Cronquist system, made his doctorate at the University of Minnesota under C.O. Rosendahl, earning his PhD in 1944.

== Publications ==
- The Problem of Subspecific Categories. Carl Otto Rosendahl, American Journal of Botany, vol. 36, no. 1, 1949

== See also ==
- List of botanists by author abbreviation (P–S)
