= Field metabolic rate =

Measurement of the metabolic rate of a wild animal

Field metabolic rate (FMR) refers to a measurement of the metabolic rate of a free-living animal.

== Method ==
Measurement of the field metabolic rate is made using the doubly labeled water method, although alternative techniques, such as monitoring heart rates, can also be used. The advantages and disadvantages of the alternative approaches have been reviewed by Butler et al. Several summary reviews have been published.
