= Metabolic age =

Age approximation using basal metabolic rate

Metabolic age is calculated by comparing one's basal metabolic rate to the average of one's chronological age group.

All the components in the body require various levels of energy to be maintained. Body fat requires much less energy than lean muscle, as lean muscle is much more metabolically active and therefore requires more energy expenditure to remain in homeostasis. If comparing two individuals, with all variables being equal, the person with more lean muscle mass will have a higher basal metabolic rate, and therefore, a lower metabolic age in comparison to those with the identical chronological age.
