= Abnormal basal metabolic rate =

- Specialty: Endocrinology

Abnormal basal metabolic rate refers to a high or low basal metabolic rate (BMR). It has numerous causes, both physiological (part of the body's normal function) and pathological (associated with disease).

== Causes ==
=== Physiological ===
An abnormal basal metabolic rate is not necessarily indicative of disease; a number of physiological factors can alter the BMR by influencing cellular metabolic activity. For instance, males are more likely than females to have a high BMR, and in women, the BMR may rise to abnormal levels during pregnancy or lactation. An individual's BMR varies greatly with age: infants and children typically have a high BMR, required for growth, while the elderly have a low BMR. Tall, thin people have a higher BMR than their shorter counterparts, even with the same weight, due to the greater surface area of their skin. The metabolic rate also decreases during sleep and increases in exercise, and individuals who exercise regularly have a higher BMR than those who are sedentary. Environmental temperature also has an effect: the BMR is increased in both heat and cold.

=== Pathological ===
A common pathological cause for a high BMR is fever, since a rise in body temperature increases the rate of cellular metabolic reactions. It is estimated that for every degree Fahrenheit of rise in body temperature, the BMR increases by 7 percent.

Thyroid disease also has a marked effect on BMR, since thyroid hormones regulate the rate of cellular metabolism. Hyperthyroidism—in which there is an increase in the production of thyroid hormones—leads to a high BMR, while hypothyroidism—in which thyroid hormones are depleted—causes a low BMR.

Prolonged periods of abnormal nutrition cause an adaptive change in BMR; this helps the body to maintain a stable body weight in response to the change in food supply. In prolonged malnutrition, the BMR declines, while in prolonged overnutrition, the BMR is increased. Cancer sometimes causes an increase in BMR, perhaps because the cancer cells that form tumors have a high level of metabolic activity.
