= Non-exercise activity thermogenesis =

Metabolic energy use excluding exercise

Non-exercise activity thermogenesis (NEAT), also known as non-exercise physical activity (NEPA), is energy expenditure during activities that are not part of a structured exercise program. NEAT includes physical activity at the workplace, hobbies, standing instead of sitting, walking around, climbing stairs, doing chores, and fidgeting. Besides differences in body composition, it represents most of the variation in energy expenditure across individuals and populations, accounting from 6-10 percent to as much as 50 percent of energy expenditure in highly active individuals.

== Relationship with obesity ==
NEAT is the main component of activity-related energy expenditure in obese individuals, as most do not do any physical exercise. NEAT, also known as nonresting energy expenditure, is also lower in obese individuals than the general population.

NEAT may be reduced in individuals who have lost weight, which some hypothesize contributes to difficulties in achieving and sustaining weight loss.

In Western countries, occupations have shifted from physical labor to sedentary work, which results in a loss of energy expenditure. Strenuous physical labor can require an excess of 1500 or more kilocalories per day compared to desk work.

== Relationship with exercise ==
It is debated whether there is a significant reduction in NEAT after beginning a structured exercise program.

== Health benefits ==
Lack of NEAT and development of obesity are posited as an explanation for health harms for prolonged sitting.

== Measurement ==
Accelerometers and questionnaires can be used to estimate NEAT.
