= Weight loss =

Reduction of the total body mass

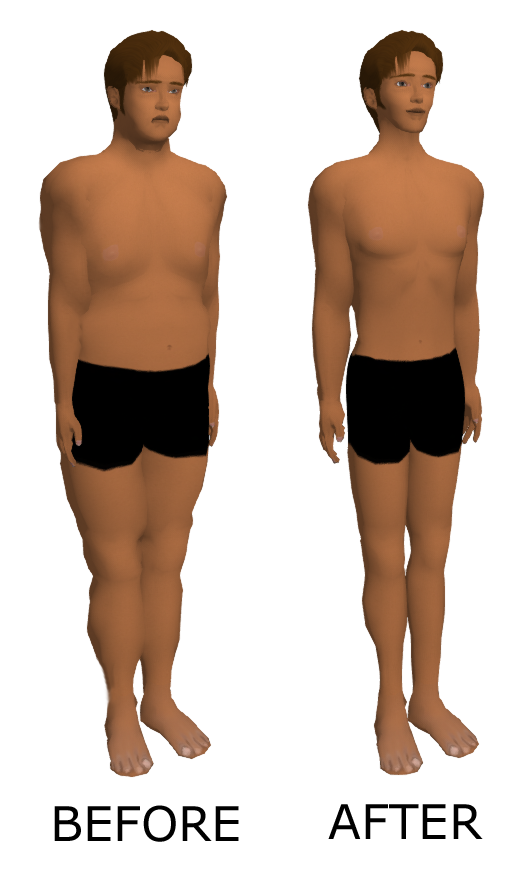

In medicine, health, or physical fitness, weight loss is a reduction of the total body mass, by a mean loss of fluid, body fat (adipose tissue), or lean mass (namely bone mineral deposits, muscle, tendon, and other connective tissue). Weight loss can either occur unintentionally because of malnourishment or an underlying disease, or from a conscious effort to improve an actual or perceived overweight or obese state. "Unexplained" weight loss that is not caused by reduction in calorific intake or increase in exercise is called cachexia and may be a symptom of a serious medical condition.

== Description ==
Weight loss typically occurs when fewer calories are consumed than is expended by daily activities, physiological processes and physical exercise (known as a caloric deficit). If enough weight is lost due to a reduction in body fat, an individual may move from being overweight (25.0-29.9) or obese (30+) into a healthy weight range (18.5-24.9); however, continued weight loss beyond this point can lead to becoming underweight (< 18.5).

== Intentional ==
Intentional weight loss is the loss of total body mass as a result of efforts to improve fitness and health, or to change appearance through slimming. Weight loss is the main treatment for obesity, and there is substantial evidence this can prevent progression from prediabetes to type 2 diabetes with a 7–10% weight loss and manage cardiometabolic health for diabetic people with a 5–15% weight loss.

Weight loss in individuals who are overweight or obese can reduce health risks, increase fitness, and may delay the onset of diabetes. It could reduce pain and increase movement in people with osteoarthritis of the knee. Weight loss can lead to a reduction in hypertension (high blood pressure), however whether this reduces hypertension-related harm is unclear. Weight loss is achieved by adopting a lifestyle in which fewer calories are consumed than are expended. Depression, stress or boredom may contribute to unwanted weight gain or loss depending on the individual, and in these cases, individuals are advised to seek medical help. A 2010 study found that dieters who got a full night's sleep lost more than twice as much fat as sleep-deprived dieters. Though hypothesized that supplementation of vitamin D may help, studies do not support this. The majority of dieters regain weight over the long term. According to the UK National Health Service and the Dietary Guidelines for Americans, those who achieve and manage a healthy weight do so most successfully by being careful to consume just enough calories to meet their needs, and being physically active.

For weight loss to be permanent, changes in diet and lifestyle must be permanent as well. There is evidence that counseling or exercise alone do not result in weight loss, whereas dieting alone results in meaningful long-term weight loss, and a combination of dieting and exercise provides the best results. Meal replacements, orlistat, a very-low-calorie diet, and primary care intensive medical interventions can also support meaningful weight loss.

=== Techniques ===
==== Adjustments to eating patterns ====
The least intrusive weight loss methods, and those most often recommended, are adjustments to eating patterns. The World Health Organization recommends that people reduce eating processed foods high in saturated fats, sugar and salt. Self-monitoring of diet, exercise, and weight are beneficial strategies for weight loss, particularly early in weight loss programs. Research indicates that those who log their foods about three times per day and about 20 times per month are more likely to achieve clinically significant weight loss. Permanent weight loss depends on maintaining a negative energy balance and not the type of macronutrients (such as carbohydrate) consumed.

Higher satiety values diets can contribute to weight loss through increasing satiety and decreasing appetite. High protein diets have shown greater efficacy in the short term (under 12 months) for people eating ad libitum due to increased thermogenesis and satiety, however this effect tends to dissipate over time.

==== Exercise ====
Exercise can reduce weight. Weight training has been recommended as a type of exercise to burn fat, because of its ability to increase muscle mass, which increases metabolism. Both long-term exercise programs and anti-obesity medications reduce abdominal fat volume.

==== Hydration ====
Increasing water intake can reduce weight by increasing thermogenesis, by reducing food intake, and by increasing fat oxidation. Persons dieting for weight loss have demonstrated the weight-reducing effects of increased water consumption. Among adults in the U.S. there is a significant association between inadequate hydration and obesity.

==== Medications ====
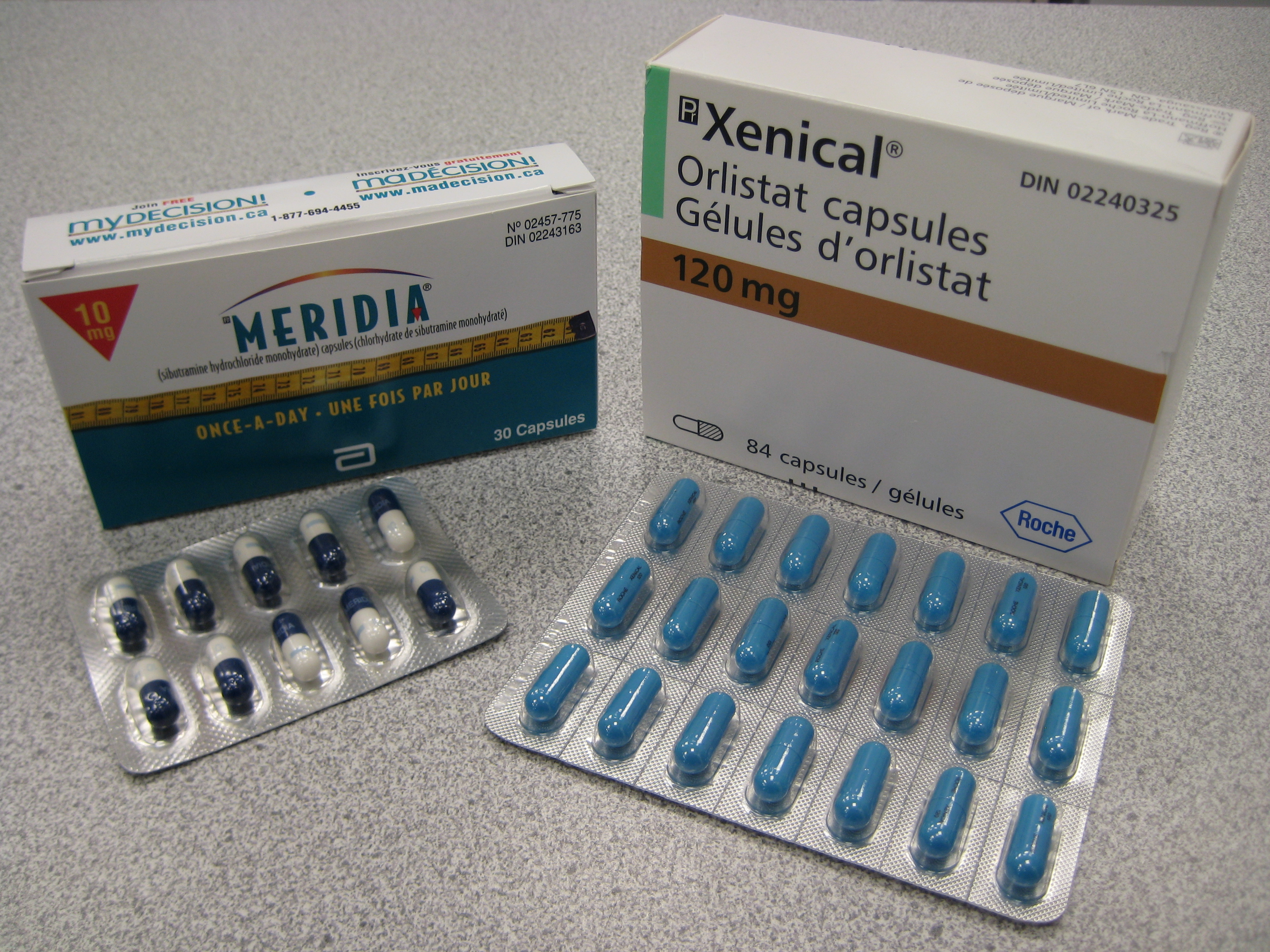
Orlistat (Xenical), a commonly used anti-obesity medication, and sibutramine (Meridia), a withdrawn medication due to cardiovascular side effects

Other methods of weight loss include use of anti-obesity drugs that decrease appetite, block fat absorption, or reduce stomach volume. Obesity has been resistant to drug-based therapies, with a 2021 review stating that existing medications are "often delivering insufficient efficacy and dubious safety". Semaglutide has also become popular recently as an aid in weight loss. It is particularly beneficial for those with type 2 diabetes and obesity.

==== Bariatric surgery ====
Bariatric surgery may be indicated in cases of severe obesity. Two common bariatric surgical procedures are gastric bypass and gastric banding. Both can be effective at limiting the intake of food energy by reducing the size of the stomach, but as with any surgical procedure both come with their own risks that should be considered in consultation with a physician.

=== Weight loss industry ===
There is a substantial market for products which claim to make weight loss easier, quicker, cheaper, more reliable, or less painful. These include books, DVDs, CDs, cremes, lotions, pills, rings and earrings, body wraps, body belts and other materials, fitness centers, clinics, personal coaches, weight loss groups, and food products and supplements. Dietary supplements, though widely used, are not considered a healthy option for weight loss, and have no clinical evidence of efficacy. Herbal products have not been shown to be effective.

In 2008, between US$33 billion and $55 billion was spent annually in the US on weight-loss products and services, including medical procedures and pharmaceuticals, with weight-loss centers taking between 6 and 12 percent of total annual expenditure. Over $1.6 billion per year was spent on weight-loss supplements. About 70 percent of Americans' dieting attempts are of a self-help nature.

In Western Europe, sales of weight-loss products, excluding prescription medications, topped €1,25 billion (£900 million/$1.4 billion) in 2009.

The scientific soundness of commercial diets by commercial weight management organizations varies widely, being previously non-evidence-based, so there is only limited evidence supporting their use, because of high attrition rates. Commercial diets result in modest weight loss in the long term, with similar results regardless of the brand, and similarly to non-commercial diets and standard care. Comprehensive diet programs, providing counseling and targets for calorie intake, are more efficient than dieting without guidance ("self-help"), although the evidence is very limited. The National Institute for Health and Care Excellence devised a set of essential criteria to be met by commercial weight management organizations to be approved.

== Unintentional ==
=== Characteristics ===
Unintentional weight loss may result from loss of body fats, loss of body fluids, muscle atrophy, or a combination of these. It is generally regarded as a medical problem when at least 10% of a person's body weight has been lost in six months or 5% in the last month. Another criterion used for assessing weight that is too low is the body mass index (BMI). However, even lesser amounts of weight loss can be a cause for serious concern in a frail elderly person.

Unintentional weight loss can occur because of an inadequately nutritious diet relative to a person's energy needs (generally called malnutrition). Disease processes, changes in metabolism, hormonal changes, medications or other treatments, disease- or treatment-related dietary changes, or reduced appetite associated with a disease or treatment can also cause unintentional weight loss. Poor nutrient utilization can lead to weight loss, and can be caused by fistulae in the gastrointestinal tract, diarrhea, drug-nutrient interaction, enzyme depletion and muscle atrophy.

Continuing weight loss may deteriorate into wasting, a vaguely defined condition called cachexia. Cachexia differs from starvation in part because it involves a systemic inflammatory response. It is associated with poorer outcomes. In the advanced stages of progressive disease, metabolism can change so that they lose weight even when they are getting what is normally regarded as adequate nutrition and the body cannot compensate. This leads to a condition called anorexia cachexia syndrome (ACS) and additional nutrition or supplementation is unlikely to help. Symptoms of weight loss from ACS include severe weight loss from muscle rather than body fat, loss of appetite and feeling full after eating small amounts, nausea, anemia, weakness and fatigue.

Serious weight loss may reduce quality of life, impair treatment effectiveness or recovery, worsen disease processes and be a risk factor for high mortality rates. Malnutrition can affect every function of the human body, from the cells to the most complex body functions, including:

- immune response;
- wound healing;
- muscle strength (including respiratory muscles);
- renal capacity and depletion leading to water and electrolyte disturbances;
- thermoregulation; and
- menstruation.

Malnutrition can lead to vitamin and other deficiencies and to inactivity, which in turn may pre-dispose to other problems, such as pressure sores. Unintentional weight loss can be the characteristic leading to diagnosis of diseases such as cancer and type 1 diabetes. In the UK, up to 5% of the general population is underweight, but more than 10% of those with lung or gastrointestinal diseases and who have recently had surgery. According to data in the UK using the Malnutrition Universal Screening Tool ('MUST'), which incorporates unintentional weight loss, more than 10% of the population over the age of 65 is at risk of malnutrition. A high proportion (10–60%) of hospital patients are also at risk, along with a similar proportion in care homes.

=== Causes ===
==== Disease-related ====
Disease-related malnutrition can be considered in four categories:

Overview of disease-related causes for weight loss
Problem	Cause
Impaired intake	Poor appetite can be a direct symptom of an illness, or an illness could make eating painful or induce nausea. Illness can also cause food aversion. Inability to eat can result from: diminished consciousness or confusion, or physical problems affecting the arm or hands, swallowing or chewing. Eating restrictions may also be imposed as part of treatment or investigations. Lack of food can result from: poverty, difficulty in shopping or cooking, and poor quality meals.
Impaired digestion &/or absorption	This can result from conditions that affect the digestive system.
Altered requirements	Changes to metabolic demands can be caused by illness, surgery and organ dysfunction.
Excess nutrient losses	Losses from the gastrointestinal can occur because of symptoms such as vomiting or diarrhea, as well as fistulae and stomas. There can also be losses from drains, including nasogastric tubes. Other losses: Conditions such as burns can be associated with losses such as skin exudates.

Weight loss issues related to specific diseases include:

- As chronic obstructive pulmonary disease (COPD) advances, about 35% of patients experience severe weight loss called pulmonary cachexia, including diminished muscle mass. Around 25% experience moderate to severe weight loss, and most others have some weight loss. Greater weight loss is associated with poorer prognosis. Theories about contributing factors include appetite loss related to reduced activity, additional energy required for breathing, and the difficulty of eating with dyspnea (labored breathing).
- Cancer, a very common and sometimes fatal cause of unexplained (idiopathic) weight loss. About one-third of unintentional weight loss cases are secondary to malignancy. Cancers to suspect in patients with unexplained weight loss include gastrointestinal, prostate, hepatobiliary (hepatocellular carcinoma, pancreatic cancer), ovarian, hematologic or lung malignancies.
- People with HIV often experience weight loss, and it is associated with poorer outcomes. Wasting syndrome is an AIDS-defining condition.
- Gastrointestinal disorders are another common cause of unexplained weight loss – in fact they are the most common non-cancerous cause of idiopathic weight loss. Possible gastrointestinal etiologies of unexplained weight loss include: celiac disease, peptic ulcer disease, inflammatory bowel disease (crohn's disease and ulcerative colitis), pancreatitis, gastritis, diarrhea, chronic mesenteric ischemia and many other GI conditions.
- Infection. Some infectious diseases can cause weight loss. Fungal illnesses, endocarditis, many parasitic diseases, AIDS, Whipple's disease and some other subacute or occult infections may cause weight loss.
- Renal disease. Patients who have uremia often have poor or absent appetite, vomiting and nausea. This can cause weight loss.
- Cardiac disease. Cardiovascular disease, especially congestive heart failure, may cause unexplained weight loss.
- Connective tissue disease
- Oral, taste or dental problems (including infections) can reduce nutrient intake leading to weight loss.

==== Therapy-related ====
Medical treatment can directly or indirectly cause weight loss, impairing treatment effectiveness and recovery that can lead to further weight loss in a vicious cycle. Many patients will be in pain and have a loss of appetite after surgery. Part of the body's response to surgery is to direct energy to wound healing, which increases the body's overall energy requirements. Surgery affects nutritional status indirectly, particularly during the recovery period, as it can interfere with wound healing and other aspects of recovery. Surgery directly affects nutritional status if a procedure permanently alters the digestive system. Enteral nutrition (tube feeding) is often needed. However a policy of 'nil by mouth' for all gastrointestinal surgery has not been shown to benefit, with some weak evidence suggesting it might hinder recovery. Early post-operative nutrition is a part of Enhanced Recovery After Surgery protocols. These protocols also include carbohydrate loading in the 24 hours before surgery, but earlier nutritional interventions have not been shown to have a significant impact.

==== Social conditions ====
Social conditions such as poverty, social isolation and inability to get or prepare preferred foods can cause unintentional weight loss, and this may be particularly common in older people. Nutrient intake can also be affected by culture, family and belief systems. Ill-fitting dentures and other dental or oral health problems can also affect adequacy of nutrition.

Loss of hope, status or social contact and spiritual distress can cause depression, which may be associated with reduced nutrition, as can fatigue.

== Myths ==
Some popular beliefs attached to weight loss have been shown to either have less effect on weight loss than commonly believed or are actively unhealthy. According to Harvard Health, the idea of metabolic rate being the "key to weight" is "part truth and part myth" as while metabolism does affect weight loss, external forces such as diet and exercise have an equal effect. They also commented that the idea of changing one's rate of metabolism is under debate. Diet plans in fitness magazines are also often believed to be effective but may actually be harmful by limiting the daily intake of important calories and nutrients which can be detrimental depending on the person and are even capable of driving individuals away from weight loss.

== Health effects ==
Obesity is a risk factor for certain conditions, including diabetes, cancer, cardiovascular disease, high blood pressure, and non-alcoholic fatty liver disease. Reduction of obesity lowers those risks. A 1 kilogram (2.2 lb) loss of body weight has been associated with an approximate 1 millimetre of mercury (0.13 kPa) drop in blood pressure. Intentional weight loss is associated with cognitive performance improvements in overweight and obese individuals.

== See also ==
- Anorexia
- Cigarette smoking for weight loss
- Weight gain
