= Tritiated water =

Radioactive form of water

Tritium oxide
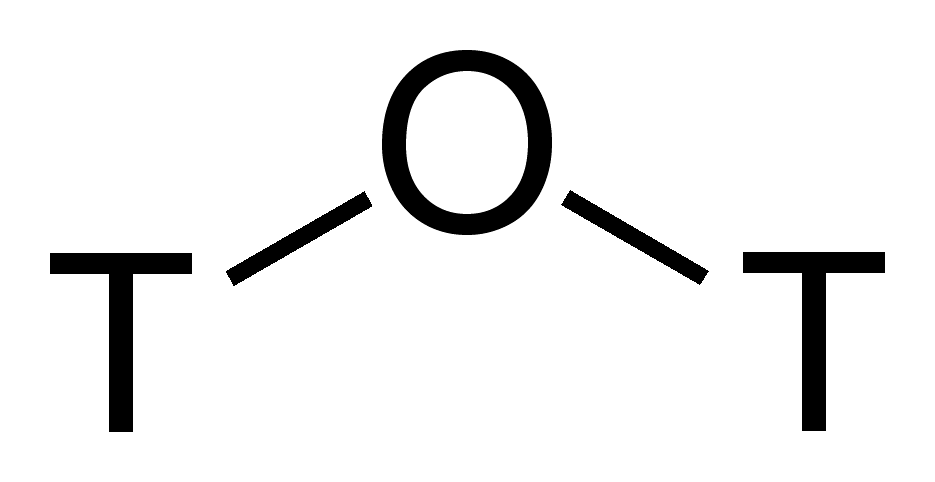
- All types of isotopically substituted water molecules have this structure.

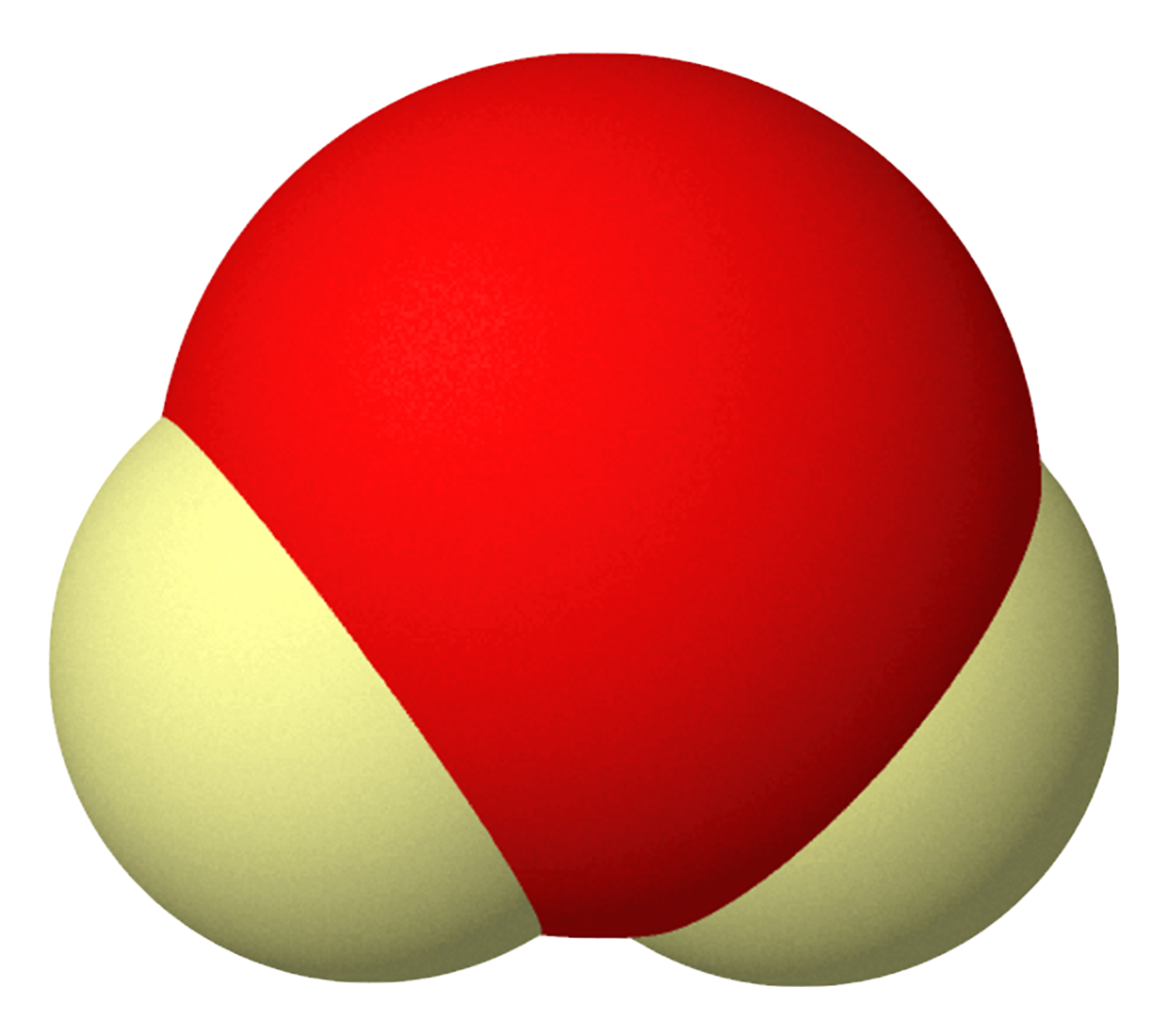

Names
- IUPAC name [^{3}H]_{2}-water
- Systematic IUPAC name (^{3}H_{2})Water
- Other names: Super-heavy water; Tritium oxide; Ditritium oxide

Identifiers
CAS Number	14940-65-9
3D model (JSmol)	Interactive image
ChEBI	CHEBI:29374
ChemSpider	94563
MeSH	tritium+oxide
PubChem CID	104752
CompTox Dashboard (EPA)	DTXSID80894747
- InChI: InChI=1S/H2O/h1H2/i/hT2 Key: XLYOFNOQVPJJNP-PWCQTSIFSA-N
- SMILES: [3H]O[3H]

Properties
Chemical formula	T_{2}O or ^{3}H_{2}O
Molar mass	22.0315 g·mol^{−1}
Appearance	Colorless liquid
Density	1.21 g/mL
Melting point	4.48 °C (40.06 °F; 277.63 K)
Boiling point	101.51 °C (214.72 °F; 374.66 K)
Acidity (pK_{a})	15.21
- Except where otherwise noted, data are given for materials in their standard state (at 25 °C [77 °F], 100 kPa). verify (what is ?) Infobox references

Tritiated water is a radioactive form of water in which the usual protium atoms are replaced with tritium atoms. In its pure form it may be called tritium oxide (T_{2}O or ^{3}H_{2}O) or super-heavy water. Pure T_{2}O is a colorless liquid, and it is corrosive due to self-radiolysis. Diluted, tritiated water is mainly H_{2}O plus some HTO (^{3}HOH). It is also used as a tracer for water transport studies in life-science research. Furthermore, since it naturally occurs in minute quantities, it can be used to determine the age of various water-based liquids, such as vintage wines.

The name super-heavy water helps distinguish the tritiated material from heavy water, which contains deuterium instead.

== Self-radiolysis ==
Tritiated water is primarily studied as a dilute solution within light water. Here, the proportion of the light, hydrogen tritium oxide is strongly favoured versus the more negligible heavy, double tritium oxide, as the conversion reaction has an equilibrium constant of 3.42 at room temperature.

$$\ce{H2O + T2O <=>> 2HTO}$$

The molecules then experience beta decay and formation of the hydroxyl or tritoxyl radical via:

$$\ce{HTO ->\  ^{3}He^{+} \  +\  \beta^{-}   +  \ \bar{\nu} \ +\  OH^{.}}$$

$$\ce{T2O ->\  ^{3}He^{+} \  +\  \beta^{-}   +  \ \bar{\nu} \ +\  OT^{.}}$$

The average electron energy of the beta decay is 5.7 keV. The energy required to break hydrogen-oxygen bonds in water is three orders of magnitude lower at 5.2 eV. This leads to many radiolysis events:

$$\ce{H2O \; ->[\text{beta rays}] \; e^{-}_{aq}, HO*, H*, HO2*, H3O^+, OH^-, H2O2, H2}$$

Many subsequent reactions occur, but primarily result in recombination to water, or the escape of molecular hydrogen and oxygen gas, alongside the helium-3.

Studies of tritiated water often prefer to describe the concentration by the measurable radiation level in curies per liter (Ci/L) or terabecquerels per liter (TBq/L), rather than the species proportion.

In one CEA study, relatively highly tritiated water at 1,800 Ci/L or 74 TBq/L (0.12% HTO, negligible T_{2}O) was left to self-radiolyze for 56 days in three volumes. In the 300 mL volume, the primary gases collected were H_{2} at 2.54 mmol, O_{2} at 1.31 mmol, and ^{3}He at 0.13 mmol. Thus in this geometry, for each tritium decay, roughly twenty water molecules were permanently dissociated.

== Applications ==
Tritiated water can be used to measure an organism's total body water (TBW). Unlike doubly labeled water this method relies on scintillation counting. Tritiated water distributes itself into all body compartments relatively quickly. The concentration of tritiated water in urine is assumed to be similar to the concentration of tritiated water in the body. TBW is determined from the following relation:

$$\text{body water volume} = \frac{\text{mass ingested} - \text{mass excreted}}{\text{concentration}}$$

== Health risks ==
Tritium is radioactive and a low energy beta emitter.

While HTO is produced naturally by cosmic ray interactions in the stratosphere, it is also produced by human activities and can increase local concentrations and be considered an air and water pollutant. Anthropogenic sources of tritiated water include nuclear weapons testing, nuclear power plants, nuclear reprocessing and consumer products such as self-illuminating watches and signs.

HTO has a short biological half-life in the human body of 7 to 14 days, which both reduces the total effects of single-incident ingestion and precludes long-term bioaccumulation of HTO from the environment. The biological half life of tritiated water in the human body, which is a measure of body water turn-over, varies with the season. Studies on the biological half life of occupational radiation workers for free water tritium in a coastal region of Karnataka, India, show that the biological half life in the winter season is twice that of the summer season.

If tritium exposure is suspected or known, drinking uncontaminated water will help replace the tritium from the body. Increasing sweating, urination or breathing can help the body expel water and thereby the tritium contained in it. However, care should be taken that neither dehydration nor a depletion of the body's electrolytes results as the health consequences of those things (particularly in the short term) can be more severe than those of tritium exposure.
