= James Arthur Harris =

Botanist and biometrician (1880–1930)

James Arthur Harris (1880–1930) was a botanist and biometrician, known for the Harris–Benedict equation.

He was the head of the department of botany at the University of Minnesota from 1924 to 1930. (He was both preceded and succeeded by Carl Otto Rosendahl.)

In 1922, he was elected as a fellow of the American Statistical Association.
