= Doubly labeled water =

Water made of uncommon hydrogen and oxygen isotopes

Doubly labeled water is water in which both the hydrogen and the oxygen have been partly or completely replaced (i.e. labeled) with an uncommon isotope of these elements for tracing purposes.

In practice, for both practical and safety reasons, almost all recent applications of the "doubly labeled water" (DLW) method use water labeled with heavy but non-radioactive forms of each element (deuterium, ^{2}H; and oxygen-18, ^{18}O). In theory, radioactive heavy isotopes of the elements could be used for such labeling; this was the case in many early applications of the method.

In particular, DLW can be used for a method to measure the average daily metabolic rate of an organism over a period of time (often also called the Field metabolic rate, or FMR, in non-human animals). This is done by administering a dose of DLW, then measuring the elimination rates of ^{2}H and ^{18}O in the subject over time (through regular sampling of heavy isotope concentrations in body water, by sampling saliva, urine, or blood). At least two samples are required: an initial sample (after the isotopes have reached equilibrium in the body), and a second sample some time later. The time between these samples depends on the size of the animal. In small animals, the period may be as short as 24 hours; in larger animals (such as adult humans), the period may be as long as 14 days.

The method was invented in the 1950s by Nathan Lifson and colleagues at the University of Minnesota. However, its use was restricted to small animals until the 1980s because of the high cost of oxygen-18. Advances in mass spectrometry during the 1970s and early 1980s reduced the amount of isotope required, which made it feasible to apply the method to larger animals, including humans. The first application to humans was in 1982, by Dale Schoeller, over 25 years after the method was initially discovered. A complete summary of the technique is provided in a book by British biologist John Speakman.

== Mechanism of the test ==
The technique measures a subject's carbon dioxide production during the interval between first and last body water samples. The method depends on the details of carbon metabolism in our bodies. When cellular respiration breaks down carbon-containing molecules to release energy, carbon dioxide is released as a byproduct. The oxygen atoms in CO_{2} exist in equilibrium with the isotopes of oxygen in body water. Therefore if the oxygen in water is labeled with ^{18}O, then CO_{2} produced by respiration will contain labeled oxygen. In addition, as CO_{2} travels from the site of respiration through the cytoplasm of a cell, through the interstitial fluids, into the bloodstream and then to the lungs some of it is reversibly converted to bicarbonate. So, after consuming water labeled with ^{18}O, the ^{18}O equilibrates with the body's bicarbonate and dissolved carbon dioxide pool (through the action of the enzyme carbonic anhydrase). As carbon dioxide is exhaled, ^{18}O is lost from the body. This was discovered by Lifson in 1949. However, ^{18}O is also lost through body water loss (such as urine and evaporation of fluids). However, deuterium (the second label in the doubly labeled water) is lost only when body water is lost. Thus, the loss of deuterium in body water over time can be used to mathematically compensate for the loss of ^{18}O by the water-loss route. This leaves only the remaining net loss of ^{18}O in carbon dioxide. This measurement of the amount of carbon dioxide lost is an excellent estimate for total carbon dioxide production. Once this is known, the total metabolic rate may be estimated from simplifying assumptions regarding the ratio of oxygen used in metabolism (and therefore heat generated), to carbon dioxide eliminated (see respiratory quotient). This quotient can be measured in other ways, and almost always has a value between 0.7 and 1.0, and for a mixed diet is usually about 0.8.

In lay terms:

- Metabolism can be calculated from oxygen-in/CO_{2}-out.
- DLW ('tagged' water) is traceable hydrogen (deuterium), and traceable oxygen (^{18}O).
- The ^{18}O leaves the body in two ways: (i) exhaled CO_{2}, and (ii) water loss in (mostly) urine, sweat, and breath.
- But the deuterium leaves only in the second way (water loss).

From deuterium loss, we know how much of the tagged water left the body as water. And, since the concentration of ^{18}O in the body's water is measured after the labeling dose is given, we also know how much of the tagged oxygen left the body in the water. (A simpler view is that the ratio of deuterium to ^{18}O in body water is fixed, so total loss-rate of deuterium from the body multiplied by this ratio, immediately gives the loss rate of ^{18}O in water.) Measurement of ^{18}O dilution with time gives the total loss of this isotope by all routes (by water and respiration). Since the ratio of ^{18}O to total water oxygen in the body is measured, we can convert ^{18}O loss in respiration to total oxygen lost from the body's water pool via conversion to carbon dioxide. How much oxygen left the body as CO_{2} is the same as the CO_{2} produced by metabolism, since the body only produces CO_{2} by this route. The CO_{2} loss tells us the energy produced, if we know or can estimate the respiratory quotient (ratio of CO_{2} produced to oxygen used).

== Practical isotope administration ==
DLW may be administered by injection, or orally (the usual route in humans). Since the isotopes will be diluted in body water, there is no need to administer them in a state of high isotopic purity, no need to employ water in which all or even most atoms are heavy atoms, or even to begin with water which is doubly labeled. It is also unnecessary to administer exactly one atom of ^{18}O for every two atoms of deuterium. This matter in practice is governed by the economics of buying ^{18}O enriched water, and the sensitivity of the mass-spectrographic equipment available.

In practice, doses of doubly labeled water for metabolic work are prepared by simply mixing a dose of deuterium oxide (heavy water) (90 to 99%) with a second dose of H_{2}^{18}O, which is water which has been separately enriched with ^{18}O (though usually not to a high level, since doing this would be expensive, and unnecessary for this use), but otherwise contains normal hydrogen. The mixed water sample then contains both types of heavy atoms, in a far higher degree than normal water, and is now "doubly labeled." The free interchange of hydrogens between water molecules (via normal ionization) in liquid water ensures that the pools of oxygen and hydrogen in any sample of water (including the body's pool of water) will be separately equilibrated in a short time with any dose of added heavy isotope(s).

== Applications ==
The doubly labeled water method is particularly useful for measuring average metabolic rate (field metabolic rate) over relatively long periods of time (a few days or weeks), in subjects for which other types of direct or indirect calorimetric measurements of metabolic rate would be difficult or impossible. For example, the technique can measure the metabolism of animals in the wild state, with the technical problems being related mainly to how to administer the dose of isotope, and collect several samples of body water at later times to check for differential isotope elimination.

Most animal studies involve capturing the subject animals and injecting them, then holding them for a variable period before the first blood sample has been collected. This period depends on the size of the animal involved and varies between 30 minutes for very small animals to 6 hours for much larger animals. In both animals and humans, the test is made more accurate if a single determination of respiratory quotient has been made for the organism eating the standard diet at the time of measurement, since this value changes relatively little (and more slowly) compared with the much larger metabolic rate changes related to thermoregulation and activity.

Because the heavy hydrogen and oxygen isotopes used in the standard DLW measurement are non-radioactive, and also non-toxic in the doses used (see heavy water), the DLW measurement of mean metabolic rate has been used extensively in human volunteers, and even in infants and pregnant women. The technique has been used on over 200 species of wild animals (mostly birds, mammals and some reptiles). Applications of the method to animals have been reviewed. A paper in 2021 summarized the results of over 6400 measurements using the technique in humans aged between 8 days and 96 years old.

DLW (^{2}H_{2}^{18}O) can also be used for unusually warm ice and unusually dense water, as it has a higher melting point than and is denser than either light water or what is normally meant by "heavy water" (^{2}H_{2}^{16}O). ^{2}H_{2}^{18}O melts at 4.00~4.04°C (39.2~39.27°F) and the liquid reaches its maximum density of 1.21684~1.21699 g/cm^{3} at 11.43~11.49°C (52.57~52.68°F).

== See also ==
- Tritiated water
- Tritium
