= Calorie restriction =

Dietary regime

Calorie restriction (CR, also known as caloric restriction or energy restriction) is a dietary regimen that reduces the energy intake from foods and beverages below energy requirements, without incurring malnutrition. The possible effect of calorie restriction on body weight management, longevity, and aging-associated diseases has been an active area of research.

== Dietary guidelines ==
Caloric intake control, and reduction for overweight individuals, is recommended by US dietary guidelines and science-based societies.

Calorie restriction is recommended for people with diabetes and prediabetes, in combination with physical exercise and a weight loss goal of 5-15% for diabetes and 7-10% for prediabetes to prevent progression to diabetes. Mild calorie restriction may be beneficial for pregnant women to decrease weight gain (without weight loss), if needed or advised by a doctor, and reduce perinatal risks for both the mother and child. For overweight or obese individuals, calorie restriction may improve health through weight loss, although a gradual weight regain of 1–2 kg (2.2–4.4 lb) per year may occur.

=== Risks of malnutrition ===
The term "calorie restriction" as used in the study of aging refers to dietary regimens that reduce calorie intake without incurring malnutrition. If a restricted diet is not designed to include essential nutrients, malnutrition may result in serious deleterious effects, as shown in the Minnesota Starvation Experiment. This study was conducted during World War II on a group of lean men, who restricted their calorie intake by 45% for six months and composed roughly 77% of their diet with carbohydrates. As expected, this malnutrition resulted in metabolic adaptations, such as decreased body fat, improved lipid profile, and decreased resting heart rate. The experiment also caused negative effects, such as anemia, edema, muscle wasting, weakness, dizziness, irritability, lethargy, and depression.

Typical low-calorie diets may not supply sufficient nutrient intake that is typically included in a calorie restriction diet.

=== Possible side effects ===
People losing weight during calorie restriction risk developing side effects, such as cold sensitivity, menstrual irregularities, infertility, or hormonal changes.

== Research ==
=== Humans ===
Decreasing caloric intake by 20-30%, while fulfilling nutrient requirements, has been found to remedy diseases of aging, including cancer, cardiovascular disease, dementia, and diabetes in humans, and result in an average loss of 7.9 kilograms (17 lb) in body weight, but because of the long lifespan of humans, evidence that calorie restriction could prevent age-related disease in humans remains under preliminary research. While calorie restriction leads to weight and fat loss, the precise amount of calorie intake and associated fat mass for optimal health in humans is not known. Moderate amounts of calorie restriction may have harmful effects on certain population groups, such as lean people with low body fat.

=== Life extension ===
As of 2021, intermittent fasting and calorie restriction remain under preliminary research to assess the possible effects on disease burden and increased lifespan during aging, although the relative risks associated with long-term fasting or calorie restriction remain undetermined.

Intermittent fasting refers to periods with intervals during which no food but only clear fluids are ingested – such as a period of daily time-restricted eating with a window of 8 to 12 hours for any caloric intake – and could be combined with overall calorie restriction and variants of the Mediterranean diet which may contribute to long-term cardiovascular health and longevity.

In the 1982 rat experiment, eating less lengthened life without a lower calorie intake for each gram of body weight, and across their lives the restricted animals took in more calories per gram than the ones fed freely, so the authors say the results do not support a slower metabolism as the reason.

=== Minnesota Starvation Experiment ===
The Minnesota Starvation Experiment examined the physical and psychological effects of extreme calorie restriction on 32 young and lean 24-year-old men during a 40% reduction in energy intake for 6 months. The study was designed to mimic dietary conditions during World War II. Participants could only eat 1800 kcal per day, but were required to walk 5 km per day and expend 3000 calories. The men lost about 25% of their body weight of which 67% was fat mass and 17% fat-free mass. The quality of the diet was insufficient, as it was intended to accurately represent the diet during war due to the inadequate consumption of protein, and a lack of fruits and vegetables. Despite the extreme calorie restriction, the experiment was not representative of true calorie-restrictive diets, which adhere to intake guidelines for macronutrients and micronutrients. Chronic weakness, decreased aerobic capacity, and painful lower limb edema were caused by the malnourished calorie restrictive diet. Emotional distress, confusion, apathy, depression, hysteria, hypochondriasis, suicidal thoughts, and loss of sex drive were among the abnormal psychological behaviors that occurred within six weeks.

=== Intensive care ===
As of 2019, current clinical guidelines recommend that hospitals ensure that the patients get fed with 80–100% of energy expenditure, the normocaloric feeding. A systematic review investigated whether people in intensive care units have different outcomes with normocaloric feeding or hypocaloric feeding, and found no difference. However, a comment criticized the inadequate control of protein intake, and raised concerns that hypocaloric feeding safety should be further assessed with underweight critically ill people.

=== Non-human primates ===
A calorie restriction study started in 1987 by the National Institute on Aging showed that calorie restriction did not extend years of life or reduce age-related deaths in non-obese rhesus macaques. It did improve certain measures of health, however. These results were publicized as being different from the Wisconsin rhesus macaque calorie restriction study, which also started in 1987 and showed an increase in the lifespan of rhesus macaques following calorie restriction.

In a 2017 report on rhesus monkeys, caloric restriction in the presence of adequate nutrition was effective in delaying the effects of aging. Older age of onset, female sex, lower body weight and fat mass, reduced food intake, diet quality, and lower fasting blood glucose levels were factors associated with fewer disorders of aging and with improved survival rates. Specifically, reduced food intake was beneficial in adult and older primates, but not in younger monkeys. The study indicated that caloric restriction provided health benefits with fewer age-related disorders in elderly monkeys and, because rhesus monkeys are genetically similar to humans, the benefits and mechanisms of caloric restriction may apply to human health during aging.

=== Activity levels ===
Calorie restriction preserves muscle tissue in nonhuman primates and rodents. Muscle tissue grows when stimulated, so it has been suggested that the calorie-restricted test animals exercised more than their companions on higher calories, perhaps because animals enter a foraging state during calorie restriction. However, studies show that overall activity levels are no higher in calorie restriction than ad libitum animals in youth.

=== Sirtuin-mediated mechanism ===
Preliminary research indicates that sirtuins are activated by fasting and serve as "energy sensors" during metabolism. Sirtuins, specifically Sir2 (found in yeast) have been implicated in the aging of yeast, and are a class of highly conserved, NAD^{+}-dependent histone deacetylase enzymes. Sir2 homologs have been identified in a wide range of organisms from bacteria to humans.

== See also ==
- Calorie deficit
- CR Society International
- C. elegans Ageing research
- DNA damage theory of aging Dietary restriction
- Fasting
- Intermittent fasting
- List of diets
- Okinawa diet
- Very low calorie diet
