= Harris–Benedict equation =

Method used to estimate an individual's basal metabolic rate

The Harris–Benedict equation (also called the Harris-Benedict principle) is a method used to estimate an individual's basal metabolic rate (BMR).

The estimated BMR value may be multiplied by a number that corresponds to the individual's activity level; the resulting number is the approximate daily kilocalorie intake to maintain current body weight.

The Harris-Benedict equation may be used to assist weight loss — by reducing the kilocalorie intake number below the estimated maintenance intake of the equation.

== Calculating the Harris-Benedict BMR ==
The original Harris–Benedict equations were published in 1918 and 1919.

| Sex | Calculations of BMR |
|---|---|
| Male | ${BMR}={a_m}M+{b_m}H-{c_m}T+d_m$ |
| Female | ${BMR}={a_f}M+{b_f}H-{c_f}T+d_f$ |

where M is the subject's mass, H is the subject's height, T is the subject's age, $a_m=13.7516 {kg}^{-1} {kcal}\ d^{-1}$, $b_m = 5.0033 {cm}^{-1} {kcal}\ d^{-1}$, $c_m=6.755 {kcal}\ a^{-1} d^{-1}$, $d_m=66.473 {kcal}\ d^{-1}$, $a_f=9.5634 {kg}^{-1} {kcal}\ d^{-1}$, $b_f = 1.8496 {cm}^{-1} {kcal}\ d^{-1}$, $c_f=4.6756 {kcal}\ a^{-1} d^{-1}$, and $d_f=655.0955 {kcal}\ d^{-1}$.

The coefficients were revised by Roza and Shizgal in 1984.

| a_{m} | $13.397 {kg}^{-1} {kcal}\ d^{-1}$ |
| a_{f} | $9.247 {kg}^{-1} {kcal}\ d^{-1}$ |
| b_{m} | $4.799 {cm}^{-1} {kcal}\ d^{-1}$ |
| b_{f} | $3.098 {cm}^{-1} {kcal}\ d^{-1}$ |
| c_{m} | $5.677 {kcal}\ a^{-1} d^{-1}$ |
| c_{f} | $4.330 {kcal}\ a^{-1} d^{-1}$ |
| d_{m} | $88.362 {kcal}\ d^{-1}$ |
| d_{f} | $447.593 {kcal}\ d^{-1}$ |

The 95% confidence range for men is ±213.0 kcal/day, and ±201.0 kcal/day for women.

The coefficients were again revised by Mifflin and St Jeor in 1990:

| a_{m}=a_{f} | $10 {kg}^{-1} {kcal}\ d^{-1}$ |
| b_{m}=b_{f} | $6.25 {cm}^{-1} {kcal}\ d^{-1}$ |
| c_{m}=c_{f} | $5 {kcal}\ a^{-1} d^{-1}$ |
| d_{m} | $5 {kcal}\ d^{-1}$ |
| d_{f} | $-161 {kcal}\ d^{-1}$ |

== History ==
The Harris-Benedict equation sprang from a study by James Arthur Harris and Francis Gano Benedict, which was published in 1919 by the Carnegie Institution of Washington in the monograph A Biometric Study Of Basal Metabolism In Man. A 1984 revision improved its accuracy. Mifflin et al. published an equation more predictive for modern lifestyles in 1990. Later work produced BMR estimators that accounted for lean body mass.

== Issues in dietary use ==
As the BMR equations do not attempt to take into account body composition, identical results can be calculated for a very muscular person, and an overweight person, who are both the same height, weight, age and gender. As muscle and fat require differing amounts of calories to maintain, the TEE estimates will not be accurate for such cases.

The paper behind the latest update (Mifflin et al) to the BMR formula states all participants in their study fall within the 'normal' and 'overweight' body mass index (BMI) categories, and so the results also do not necessarily apply to those in the 'underweight' or 'obese' BMI categories.

== See also ==
- Food energy
- Resting metabolic rate
- Institute of Medicine Equation
- Schofield equation
