= Energy expenditure =

Energy burned by the human body

Energy expenditure, often estimated as the total daily energy expenditure (TDEE), is the amount of energy burned by the human body.

== Causes of energy expenditure ==
=== Resting metabolic rate ===
Resting metabolic rate generally composes human 60 to 75 percent of TDEE. Because adipose tissue does not use much energy to maintain, fat free mass is a better predictor of metabolic rate. A taller person will typically have less fat mass than a shorter person at the same weight and therefore burn more energy. Men also carry more skeletal muscle tissue on average than women, and other sex differences in organ size account for sex differences in metabolic rate. Obese individuals burn more energy than lean individuals due to increase in the amount of calories needed to maintain adipose tissue and other organs that grow in size in response to obesity. At rest, the largest fractions of energy are burned by the skeletal muscles, brain, and liver; around 20 percent each. Increasing skeletal muscle tissue can increase metabolic rate.

=== Activity ===
Energy burned during physical activity includes the exercise activity thermogenesis (EAT) and non-exercise activity thermogenesis (NEAT).

=== Thermic effect of food ===
Thermic effect of food is the amount of energy burned digesting food, around 10 percent of TDEE. Proteins are the component of food requiring the most energy to digest.

== Changing energy expenditure ==
=== Weight change ===
Losing or gaining weight affects the energy expenditure. Reduced energy expenditure after weight loss can be a major challenge for people seeking to avoid weight regain after weight loss. It is controversial whether losing weight causes a decrease in energy expenditure greater than expected by the loss of adipose tissue and fat-free mass during weight loss. This excess reduction is termed adaptive thermogenesis and it is estimated that it might compose 50 to 100 kcal/day in people actively losing weight. Some studies have reported that it disappears after a short period of weight stability, while others report longer-lasting effects.

=== Changing the activity level ===
Increasing exercise is recommended as a way to increase energy expenditure in individuals seeking to lose weight.

=== Drugs ===
Some drugs used for weight loss work by increasing energy expenditure. Two of the earliest weight loss drugs, 2,4-dinitrophenol and thyroid hormone, increase cellular energy metabolism, but both were withdrawn from use due to risks. Adrenergic agonists, especially those that work on the beta-2 adrenergic receptor, increase energy expenditure. Although some such as clenbuterol are used without medical approval for weight loss, none have achieved approval for this indication due to cardiac risks.

Other drugs such as atypical antipsychotics are believed to reduce energy expenditure.

== Effects ==
Energy expenditure is a leading factor in regulating appetite and energy intake in humans.

== Measurement ==
Formulas have been devised to estimate energy expenditure in humans, but they may not be accurate. Specifically they may not account for the effect of certain illnesses or the elderly. Not all formula are accurate in overweight or obese individuals.

Traditional models for measuring human energy expenditure assumes that one's total daily energy expenditure (TDEE) is the simple additive sum of the measurement of each part of the body (e.g., resting metabolic rate, skeletal movement, and non-movement energy expenditures such as reproduction, digestion, immune system, etc.). Yet recent evidence suggests that the additive model may be accurate only up to an initial daily energy tipping point, after which the sum of the activities do not result in more energy expenditure, thus reflecting a constrained metabolic system. This is called the constrained daily energy expenditure model.

Wearable devices can help estimate energy expenditure from physical activity but their accuracy varies.

The Mifflin-St Jeor Equation provides a useful starting point. It estimates resting energy expenditure (REE) from your weight, height, age, and sex. Then, that estimate can be used with an activity factor to estimate TDEE.
