= Basal metabolic rate =

Rate of energy expenditure by an endotherm at rest

Basal metabolic rate (BMR) is the rate of energy expenditure per unit time by endothermic animals at rest. It is reported in energy units per unit time ranging from watt (joule/second) to ml O_{2}/min or joule per hour per kg body mass J/(h·kg). Proper measurement requires a strict set of criteria to be met. These criteria include being in a physically and psychologically undisturbed state and being in a thermally neutral environment while in the post-absorptive state (i.e., not actively digesting food). In bradymetabolic animals, such as fish and reptiles, the equivalent term standard metabolic rate (SMR) applies. It follows the same criteria as BMR, but requires the documentation of the temperature at which the metabolic rate was measured. This makes BMR a variant of standard metabolic rate measurement that excludes the temperature data, a practice that has led to problems in defining "standard" rates of metabolism for many mammals.

Metabolism comprises the processes that the body needs to function. Basal metabolic rate is the amount of energy per unit of time that a person needs to keep the body functioning at rest. Some of those processes are breathing, blood circulation, controlling body temperature, cell growth, brain and nerve function, and contraction of muscles. Basal metabolic rate affects the rate that a person burns calories and ultimately whether that individual maintains, gains, or loses weight. The basal metabolic rate accounts for about 70% of the daily calorie expenditure by individuals. It is influenced by several factors. In humans, BMR typically declines by 1–2% per decade after age 20, mostly due to loss of fat-free mass, although the variability between individuals is high.

== Description ==
The body's generation of heat is known as thermogenesis and it can be measured to determine the amount of energy expended. BMR generally decreases with age, and with the decrease in lean body mass (as may happen with aging). Increasing muscle mass has the effect of increasing BMR. Aerobic (resistance) fitness level, a product of cardiovascular exercise, while previously thought to have effect on BMR, has been shown in the 1990s not to correlate with BMR when adjusted for fat-free body mass. But anaerobic exercise does increase resting energy consumption (see "aerobic vs. anaerobic exercise"). Illness, previously consumed food and beverages, environmental temperature, and stress levels can affect one's overall energy expenditure as well as one's BMR.

Indirect calorimetry laboratory with canopy hood (dilution technique)

BMR is measured under very restrictive circumstances when a person is awake. An accurate BMR measurement requires that the person's sympathetic nervous system not be stimulated, a condition which requires complete rest. A more common measurement, which uses less strict criteria, is resting metabolic rate (RMR).

BMR may be measured by gas analysis through either direct or indirect calorimetry, though a rough estimation can be acquired through an equation using age, sex, height, and weight. Studies of energy metabolism using both methods provide convincing evidence for the validity of the respiratory quotient (RQ), which measures the inherent composition and utilization of carbohydrates, fats and proteins as they are converted to energy substrate units that can be used by the body as energy.

== Phenotypic flexibility ==
BMR is a flexible trait (it can be reversibly adjusted within individuals), with, for example, lower temperatures generally resulting in higher basal metabolic rates for both birds and rodents. There are two models to explain how BMR changes in response to temperature: the variable maximum model (VMM) and variable fraction model (VFM). The VMM states that the summit metabolism (or the maximum metabolic rate in response to the cold) increases during the winter, and that the sustained metabolism (or the metabolic rate that can be indefinitely sustained) remains a constant fraction of the former. The VFM says that the summit metabolism does not change, but that the sustained metabolism is a larger fraction of it. The VMM is supported in mammals, and, when using whole-body rates, passerine birds. The VFM is supported in studies of passerine birds using mass-specific metabolic rates (or metabolic rates per unit of mass). This latter measurement has been criticized by Eric Liknes, Sarah Scott, and David Swanson, who say that mass-specific metabolic rates are inconsistent seasonally.

In addition to adjusting to temperature, BMR also may adjust before annual migration cycles. The red knot (ssp. islandica) increases its BMR by about 40% before migrating northward. This is because of the energetic demand of long-distance flights. The increase is likely primarily due to increased mass in organs related to flight. The end destination of migrants affects their BMR: yellow-rumped warblers migrating northward were found to have a 31% higher BMR than those migrating southward.

In humans, BMR is directly proportional to a person's lean body mass. In other words, the more lean body mass a person has, the higher their BMR; but BMR is also affected by acute illnesses and increases with conditions like burns, fractures, infections, fevers, etc. In menstruating females, BMR varies to some extent with the phases of their menstrual cycle. Due to the increase in progesterone, BMR rises at the start of the luteal phase and stays at its highest until this phase ends. There are different findings in research how much of an increase usually occurs. Small sample, early studies, found various figures, such as; a 6% higher postovulatory sleep metabolism, a 7% to 15% higher 24 hour expenditure following ovulation, and an increase and a luteal phase BMR increase by up to 12%. A study by the American Society of Clinical Nutrition found that an experimental group of female volunteers had an 11.5% average increase in 24 hour energy expenditure in the two weeks following ovulation, with a range of 8% to 16%. This group was measured via simultaneously direct and indirect calorimetry and had standardized daily meals and sedentary schedule in order to prevent the increase from being manipulated by change in food intake or activity level. A 2011 study conducted by the Mandya Institute of Medical Sciences found that there is no significant difference in BMR during a woman's follicular phase and menstrual cycle, however the calories burned per hour is significantly higher (up to 18%) during the luteal phase. Increased state anxiety (stress level) also temporarily increased BMR.

== Physiology ==
The primary organ responsible for regulating metabolism is the hypothalamus. The hypothalamus is located on the diencephalon and forms the floor and part of the lateral walls of the third ventricle of the cerebrum. The chief functions of the hypothalamus are:

1. control and integration of activities of the autonomic nervous system (ANS)
  - The ANS regulates contraction of smooth muscle and cardiac muscle, along with secretions of many endocrine organs such as the thyroid gland (associated with many metabolic disorders).
  - Through the ANS, the hypothalamus is the main regulator of visceral activities, such as heart rate, movement of food through the gastrointestinal tract, and contraction of the urinary bladder.
2. production and regulation of feelings of rage and aggression
3. regulation of body temperature
4. regulation of food intake, through two centers:
  - The feeding center or hunger center is responsible for the sensations that cause us to seek food. When sufficient food or substrates have been received and leptin is high, then the satiety center is stimulated and sends impulses that inhibit the feeding center. When insufficient food is present in the stomach and ghrelin levels are high, receptors in the hypothalamus initiate the sense of hunger.
  - The thirst center operates similarly when certain cells in the hypothalamus are stimulated by the rising osmotic pressure of the extracellular fluid. If thirst is satisfied, osmotic pressure decreases.

All of these functions taken together form a survival mechanism that causes us to sustain the body processes that BMR measures.

=== Variation and causes ===
The basic metabolic rate varies between individuals. One 2005 study of 150 adults representative of the population in Scotland reported basal metabolic rates from as low as 1,027 kilocalories (4,300 kJ) per day to as high as 2,499 kilocalories (10,460 kJ), with a mean BMR of 1,500 kilocalories (6,300 kJ) per day.

The early work of the scientists J. Arthur Harris and Francis G. Benedict showed that approximate values for BMR could be derived using body surface area (computed from height and weight), age, and sex, along with the oxygen and carbon dioxide measures taken from calorimetry. (Exercise physiology textbooks have tables to show the conversion of height and body surface area as they relate to weight and basal metabolic values.)

Studies also showed that by eliminating the sex differences that occur with the accumulation of adipose tissue by expressing metabolic rate per unit of "fat-free" or lean body mass, the values between sexes for basal metabolism are essentially the same. The aforementioned 2005 study in particular found that 62% of the variation in BMR among participants was explained by differences in fat free mass (FFM). Other factors explaining the variation included fat mass (7%), age (2%), and experimental error including within-subject difference (2%). The rest of the variation (27%) was unexplained. This remaining difference was not explained by sex, leptin levels, triiodothyronine levels, or by differing tissue size of highly energetic organs such as the brain.

In a 2012 study of 8780 white obese subjects, it was found that body weight and fat-free mass had similar predictive power when used to estimate BMR, their respective combination with gender and age being able to explain 59% or 60% of the variation. Gender plays a role in determining BMR in children and adolescents, but not in adults. In addition, the age-related reduction in BMR is mostly explained by the decrease in FFM.

The BMR of the average person has also changed over time. A cross-sectional study of more than 1400 subjects in Europe and the US showed that once adjusted for differences in body composition (lean and fat mass) and age, BMR has fallen over the past 35 years. The decline was also observed in a meta-analysis of more than 150 studies dating back to the early 1920s, translating into a decline in total energy expenditure of about 6%.

=== BMR estimation formulas ===
Several equations to predict the number of calories required by humans have been published from the early 20th–21st centuries.

==== Equations based on total body weight ====
Historically, accurate measurements of body composition were difficult to obtain. As technologies to measure lean body mass directly (e.g. Dual-energy X-ray absorptiometry) did not exist when early researchers developed these equations, they relied on total body weight, height, age, and sex as proxies for metabolic activity. In each of the formulas below:

- P is total heat production at complete rest,
- m is mass (kg),
- h is height (cm),
- a is age (years).

The original Harris–Benedict equation (1919)

The most notable early formula was the Harris–Benedict equation, published in 1919:

for men, $P = \left( \frac{13.7516 m}{1~\text{kg}} + \frac{5.0033 h}{1~\text{cm}} - \frac{6.7550 a}{1~\text{year}} + 66.4730 \right) \frac{\text{kcal}}{\text{day}},$
for women, $P = \left( \frac{9.5634 m}{1~\text{kg}} + \frac{1.8496 h}{1~\text{cm}} - \frac{4.6756 a}{1~\text{year}} + 655.0955 \right) \frac{\text{kcal}}{\text{day}}.$

The difference in BMR for men and women is mainly due to differences in body mass. For example, a 55-year-old woman weighing 130 pounds (59 kg) and 66 inches (168 cm) tall would have a BMR of 1,272 kilocalories (5,320 kJ) per day.

The revised Harris–Benedict equation (1984)

In 1984, the original Harris–Benedict equations were revised using new data. In comparisons with actual expenditure, the revised equations were found to be more accurate:

for men, $P = \left( \frac{13.397 m}{1~\text{kg}} + \frac{4.799 h}{1~\text{cm}} - \frac{5.677 a}{1~\text{year}} + 88.362 \right) \frac{\text{kcal}}{\text{day}},$
for women, $P = \left( \frac{9.247 m}{1~\text{kg}} + \frac{3.098 h}{1~\text{cm}} - \frac{4.330 a}{1~\text{year}} + 447.593 \right) \frac{\text{kcal}}{\text{day}}.$

It was the best prediction equation until 1990, when Mifflin et al. introduced the equation:

The Mifflin–St Jeor equation (1990)

$$P = \left( \frac{10.0 m}{1~\text{kg}} + \frac{6.25 h}{1~\text{cm}} - \frac{5.0 a}{1~\text{year}} + s \right) \frac{\text{kcal}}{\text{day}},$$

where s is +5 for males and −161 for females.

According to this formula, the woman in the example above has a BMR of 1,204 kilocalories (5,040 kJ) per day. During the last 100 years, lifestyles have changed, and Frankenfield et al. showed it to be about 5% more accurate.

Lazzer body-weight formulas (2010)

The following formulas are based on a population of obese white people participating an Italian study.

$$P_{\text{children and adolescents}} = \left( \frac{50 m}{1~\text{kg}} - \frac{57 a}{1~\text{year}} + 1007 s + 3804\right) \frac{\text{kJ}}{\text{day}},$$
$$P_{\text{adult}} = \left( \frac{46 m}{1~\text{kg}} - \frac{14 a}{1~\text{year}} + 1140 s + 3252 \right) \frac{\text{kJ}}{\text{day}},$$

where s is 0 for females and 1 for males.

==== Equations based on lean body mass ====
These formulas take into account lean body mass, which makes them potentially more accurate for individuals with body compositions that differ significantly from the average (such as athletes and obese people). In the following:

- l is the lean body mass (LBM in kg)
- f is the body fat percentage, where l = m (1 - f / 100).

The Katch–McArdle formula (2006)

The Katch–McArdle formula is used to predict resting daily energy expenditure (RDEE). The Cunningham formula is commonly cited to predict RMR instead of BMR; however, the formulas provided by Katch–McArdle and Cunningham are the same.

$$P = 370 + 21.6 \cdot l.$$

According to this formula, if the woman in the example has a body fat percentage of 30%, her resting daily energy expenditure (the authors use the term of basal and resting metabolism interchangeably) would be 1262 kcal per day.

Lazzer lean-mass formulas (2010)

The following formulas are based on a population of obese white people participating an Italian study.

$$P_{\text{children and adolescents}} = \left( \frac{99 l}{1~\text{kg}} - \frac{28 a}{1~\text{year}} + 749 s + 3640\right) \frac{\text{kJ}}{\text{day}},$$
$$P_{\text{adult}} = \left( \frac{82 l}{1~\text{kg}} - \frac{10 a}{1~\text{year}} - 44 s + 3517 \right) \frac{\text{kJ}}{\text{day}}.$$

where s is 0 for females and 1 for males.

Comparing the adult lean-mass formula to the adult body-mass formula, one finds that the weight of gender is markedly reduced. (In fact, the confidence interval of the slope includes 0, showing that gender has no statistically significant effect.) The slope for age is also markedly smaller, supporting the idea that age-related decline in BMR is mostly explained by loss of lean mass.

== Biochemistry ==
Energy expenditure breakdown
Liver	27%
Brain	19%
Skeletal muscle	18%
Kidneys	10%
Heart	7%
Other organs	19%

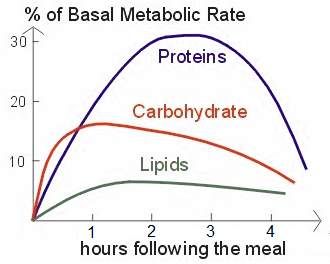
Postprandial thermogenesis: increases in basal metabolic rate occur at different degrees depending on consumed food composition.

About 70% of a human's total energy expenditure is due to the basal life processes taking place in the organs of the body (see table). About 20% of one's energy expenditure comes from physical activity and another 10% from thermogenesis, or digestion of food (postprandial thermogenesis). All of these processes require an intake of oxygen along with coenzymes to provide energy for survival (usually from macronutrients like carbohydrates, fats, and proteins) and expel carbon dioxide, due to processing by the Krebs cycle.

For the BMR, most of the energy is consumed in maintaining fluid levels in tissues through osmoregulation, and only about one-tenth is consumed for mechanical work, such as digestion, heartbeat, and breathing.

Exergonic reactions are energy-releasing reactions and are generally catabolic. Endergonic reactions require energy and include anabolic reactions and the contraction of muscle. Metabolism is the total of all catabolic, exergonic, anabolic, and endergonic reactions.

Adenosine triphosphate (ATP) is the intermediate molecule that drives the exergonic transfer of energy to switch to endergonic anabolic reactions used in muscle contraction. This is what causes muscles to work which can require a breakdown, and also to build in the rest period, which occurs during the strengthening phase associated with muscular contraction. ATP is composed of adenine, a nitrogen containing base, ribose, a five carbon sugar (collectively called adenosine), and three phosphate groups. ATP is a high energy molecule because it stores large amounts of energy in the chemical bonds of the two terminal phosphate groups. The breaking of these chemical bonds in the Krebs Cycle provides the energy needed for muscular contraction.

=== Glucose ===
Because the ratio of hydrogen to oxygen atoms in all carbohydrates is always the same as that in water—that is, 2 to 1—all of the oxygen consumed by the cells is used to oxidize the carbon in the carbohydrate molecule to form carbon dioxide. Consequently, during the complete oxidation of a glucose molecule, six molecules of carbon dioxide and six molecules of water are produced and six molecules of oxygen are consumed.

The overall equation for this reaction is

$$\ce{C6H12O6 + 6 O2 -> 6 CO2 + 6 H2O}$$

(30–32 ATP molecules produced depending on type of mitochondrial shuttle, 5–5.33 ATP molecules per molecule of oxygen.)

Because the gas exchange in this reaction is equal, the respiratory quotient (R.Q.) for carbohydrate is unity or 1.0:

$$\text{R.Q.} = \frac{\ce{6 CO2}}{\ce{6 O2}} = 1.0.$$

=== Fats ===
The chemical composition for fats differs from that of carbohydrates in that fats contain considerably fewer oxygen atoms in proportion to atoms of carbon and hydrogen. When listed on nutritional information tables, fats are generally divided into six categories: total fats, saturated fatty acid, polyunsaturated fatty acid, monounsaturated fatty acid, dietary cholesterol, and trans fatty acid. From a basal metabolic or resting metabolic perspective, more energy is needed to burn a saturated fatty acid than an unsaturated fatty acid. The fatty acid molecule is broken down and categorized based on the number of carbon atoms in its molecular structure. The chemical equation for metabolism of the twelve to sixteen carbon atoms in a saturated fatty acid molecule shows the difference between metabolism of carbohydrates and fatty acids. Palmitic acid is a commonly studied example of the saturated fatty acid molecule.

The overall equation for the substrate utilization of palmitic acid is

$$\ce{C16H32O2 + 23 O2 -> 16 CO2 + 16 H2O}$$

(106 ATP molecules produced, 4.61 ATP molecules per molecule of oxygen.)

Thus the R.Q. for palmitic acid is 0.696:

$$\text{R.Q.} = \frac{\ce{16 CO2}}{\ce{23 O2}} = 0.696.$$

=== Proteins ===
Proteins are composed of carbon, hydrogen, oxygen, and nitrogen arranged in a variety of ways to form a large combination of amino acids. Unlike fat the body has no storage deposits of protein. All of it is contained in the body as important parts of tissues, blood hormones, and enzymes. The structural components of the body that contain these amino acids are continually undergoing a process of breakdown and replacement. The respiratory quotient for protein metabolism can be demonstrated by the chemical equation for oxidation of albumin:

$$\ce{C72H112N18O22S + 77 O2 -> 63 CO2 + 38 H2O + SO3 + 9 CO(NH2)2}$$

The R.Q. for albumin is 0.818:

$$\text{R.Q.} = \frac{\ce{63 CO2}}{\ce{77 O2}} = 0.818.$$

The reason this is important in the process of understanding protein metabolism is that the body can blend the three macronutrients and based on the mitochondrial density, a preferred ratio can be established which determines how much fuel is utilized in which packets for work accomplished by the muscles. Protein catabolism (breakdown) has been estimated to supply 10% to 15% of the total energy requirement during a two-hour aerobic training session. This process could severely degrade the protein structures needed to maintain survival such as contractile properties of proteins in the heart, cellular mitochondria, myoglobin storage, and metabolic enzymes within muscles.

The oxidative system (aerobic) is the primary source of ATP supplied to the body at rest and during low intensity activities and uses primarily carbohydrates and fats as substrates. Protein is not normally metabolized significantly, except during long term starvation and long bouts of exercise (greater than 90 minutes.) At rest approximately 70% of the ATP produced is derived from fats and 30% from carbohydrates. Following the onset of activity, as the intensity of the exercise increases, there is a shift in substrate preference from fats to carbohydrates. During high intensity aerobic exercise, almost 100% of the energy is derived from carbohydrates, if an adequate supply is available.

=== Aerobic vs. anaerobic exercise ===
Studies published in 1992 and 1997 indicate that the level of aerobic fitness of an individual does not have any correlation with the level of resting metabolism. Both studies find that aerobic fitness levels do not improve the predictive power of fat free mass for resting metabolic rate.

However, recent research from the Journal of Applied Physiology, published in 2012, compared resistance training and aerobic training on body mass and fat mass in overweight adults (STRRIDE AT/RT). When time commitment is evaluated against health benefit, aerobic training is the optimal mode of exercise for reducing fat mass and body mass as a primary consideration, and resistance training is good as a secondary factor when aging and lean mass are a concern. Resistance training causes injuries at a much higher rate than aerobic training. Compared to resistance training, it was found that aerobic training resulted in a significantly more pronounced reduction of body weight by enhancing the cardiovascular system which is what is the principal factor in metabolic utilization of fat substrates. Resistance training if time is available is also helpful in post-exercise metabolism, but it is an adjunctive factor because the body needs to heal sufficiently between resistance training episodes, whereas the body can accept aerobic training every day. RMR and BMR are measurements of daily consumption of calories. The majority of studies that are published on this topic look at aerobic exercise because of its efficacy for health and weight management.

Anaerobic exercise, such as weight lifting, builds additional muscle mass. Muscle contributes to the fat-free mass of an individual and therefore effective results from anaerobic exercise will increase BMR. However, the actual effect on BMR is controversial and difficult to enumerate. Various studies suggest that the resting metabolic rate of trained muscle is around 55 kJ/kg per day; it then follows that even a substantial increase in muscle mass — say 5 kg — would make only a minor impact on BMR.

== Longevity ==
In 1926, Raymond Pearl proposed that longevity varies inversely with basal metabolic rate (the "rate of living hypothesis"). Support for this hypothesis comes from the fact that mammals with larger body size have longer maximum life spans (large animals do have higher total metabolic rates, but the metabolic rate at the cellular level is much lower, and the breathing rate and heartbeat are slower in larger animals) and the fact that the longevity of fruit flies varies inversely with ambient temperature. Additionally, the life span of houseflies can be extended by preventing physical activity. This theory has been bolstered by several new studies linking lower basal metabolic rate to increased life expectancy, across the animal kingdom—including humans. Calorie restriction and reduced thyroid hormone levels, both of which decrease the metabolic rate, have been associated with higher longevity in animals.

However, the ratio of total daily energy expenditure to resting metabolic rate can vary between 1.6 and 8.0 between species of mammals. Animals also vary in the degree of coupling between oxidative phosphorylation and ATP production, the amount of saturated fat in mitochondrial membranes, the amount of DNA repair, and many other factors that affect maximum life span.

One problem with understanding the associations of lifespan and metabolism is that changes in metabolism are often confounded by other factors that may affect lifespan. For example, under calorie restriction whole body metabolic rate goes down with increasing levels of restriction, but body temperature also follows the same pattern. By manipulating the ambient temperature and exposure to wind it was shown in mice and hamsters that body temperature is a more important modulator of lifespan than metabolic rate.

== Medical considerations ==
A person's metabolism varies with their physical condition and activity. Weight training can have a longer impact on metabolism than aerobic training, but there are no known mathematical formulas that can exactly predict the length and duration of a raised metabolism from trophic changes with anabolic neuromuscular training.

A decrease in food intake will typically lower the metabolic rate as the body tries to conserve energy. Researcher Gary Foster estimates that a very low calorie diet of fewer than 800 calories a day would reduce the metabolic rate by more than 10 percent.

The metabolic rate can be affected by some drugs: antithyroid agents (drugs used to treat hyperthyroidism) such as propylthiouracil and methimazole bring the metabolic rate down to normal, restoring euthyroidism. Some research has focused on developing antiobesity drugs to raise the metabolic rate, such as drugs to stimulate thermogenesis in skeletal muscle.

The metabolic rate may be elevated in stress, illness, and diabetes. Menopause may also affect metabolism.

== See also ==
- Abnormal basal metabolic rate
- Field metabolic rate
- Harris–Benedict equation
- Human-body emission
- Hypothyroidism
- Metabolic age
- Metabolic syndrome
- Schofield equation
- Thermic effect of food
