= Bradymetabolism =

Organisms with a high active metabolism

Bradymetabolism refers to organisms with a high active metabolism and a considerably slower resting metabolism. Bradymetabolic animals can often undergo dramatic changes in metabolic speed, according to food availability and temperature. Many bradymetabolic creatures in deserts and in areas that experience extreme winters are capable of "shutting down" their metabolisms to approach near-death states, until favorable conditions return (see hibernation and estivation).

Several variants of bradymetabolism exists. In mammals, the animals normally have a fairly high metabolism, only dropping to low levels in times of little food. In most reptiles, the normal metabolic rate is quite low, but can be raised when needed, typically in short bursts of activity in connection with capturing prey.

== Etymology ==
The term is from Greek brady (βραδύ) "slow" and metaballein (μεταβάλλειν) "turn quickly."

== See also ==
- ectotherm
- homeotherm
- bradyaerobic
- tachyaerobic
- tachymetabolic
