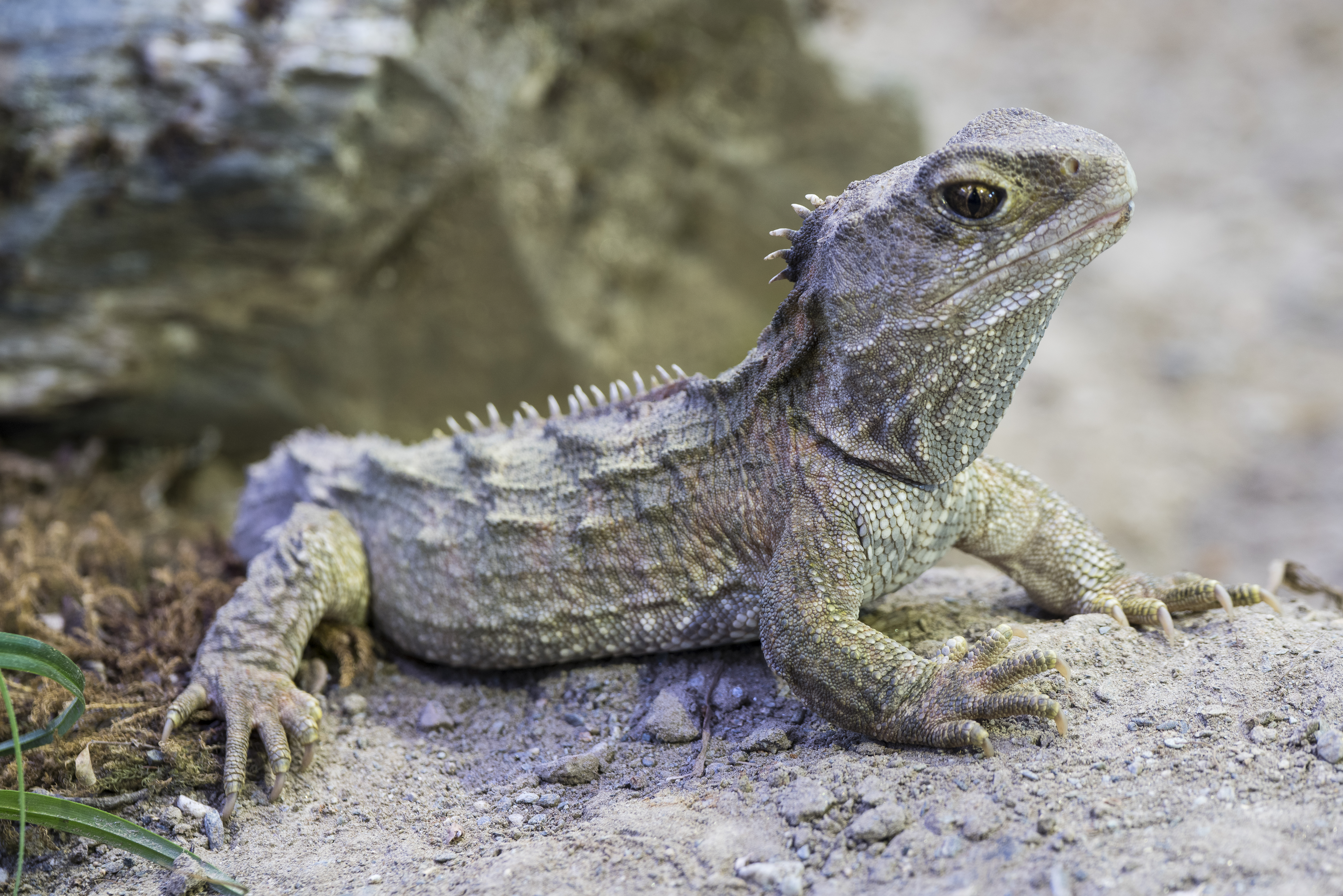
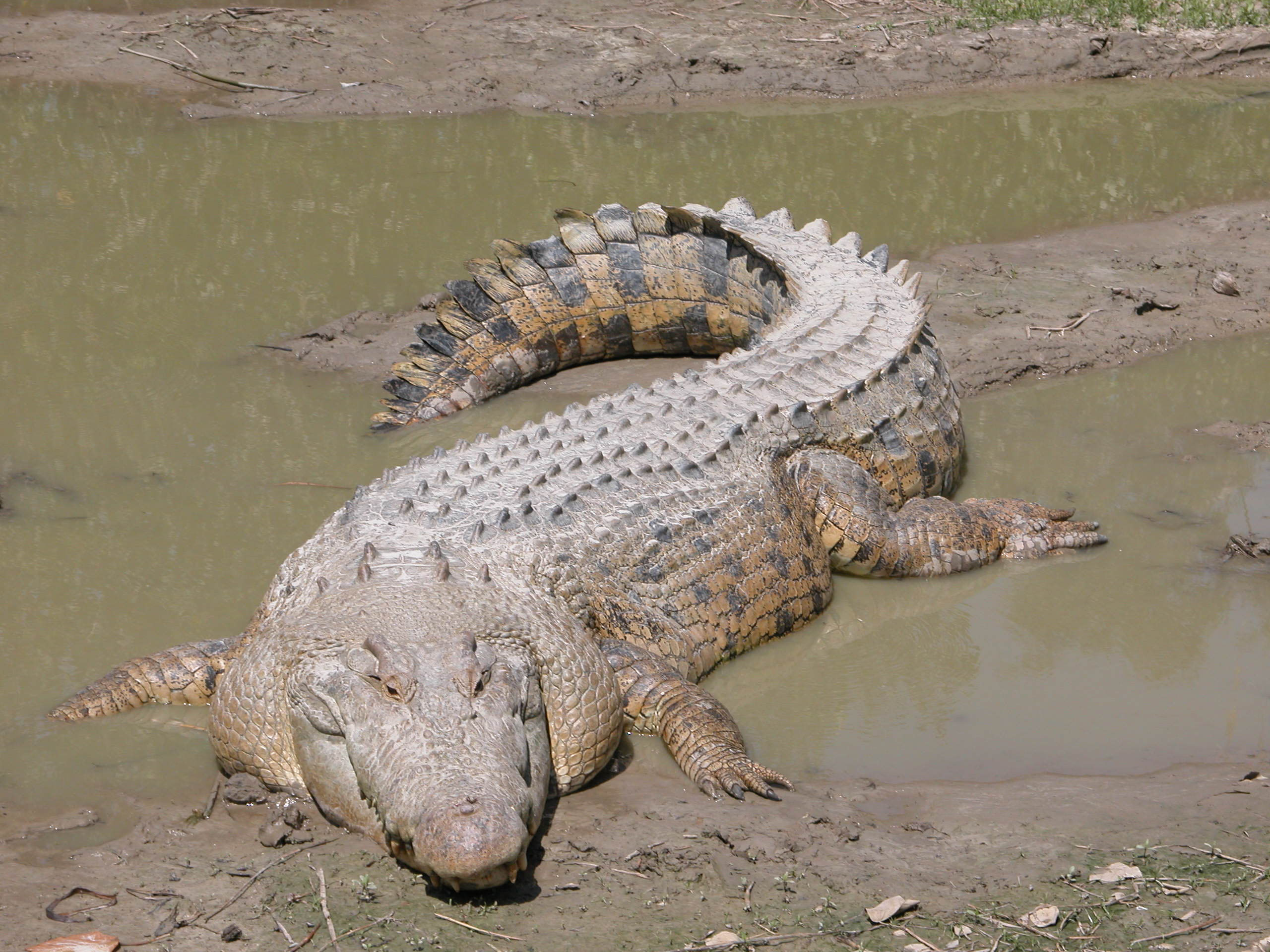
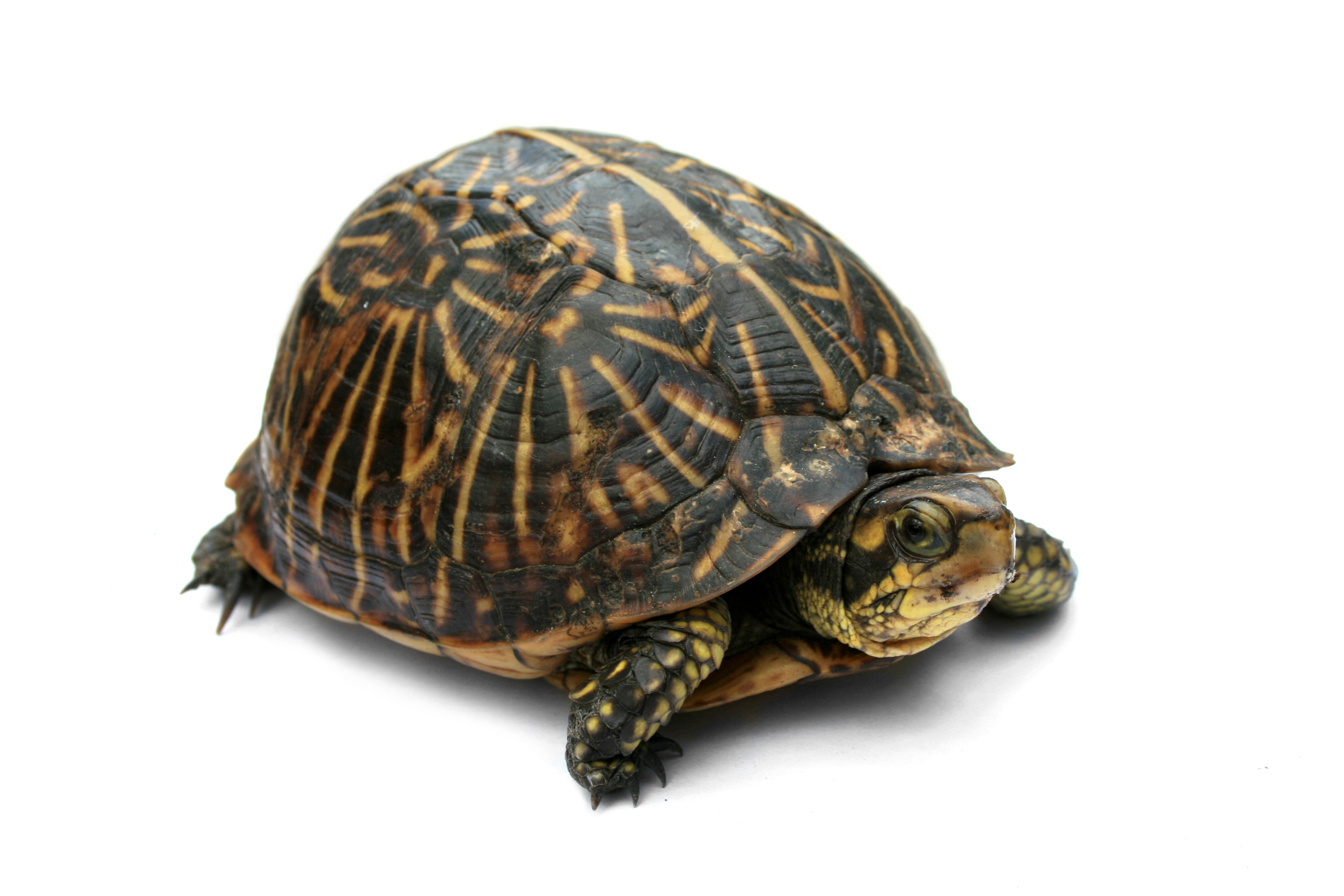
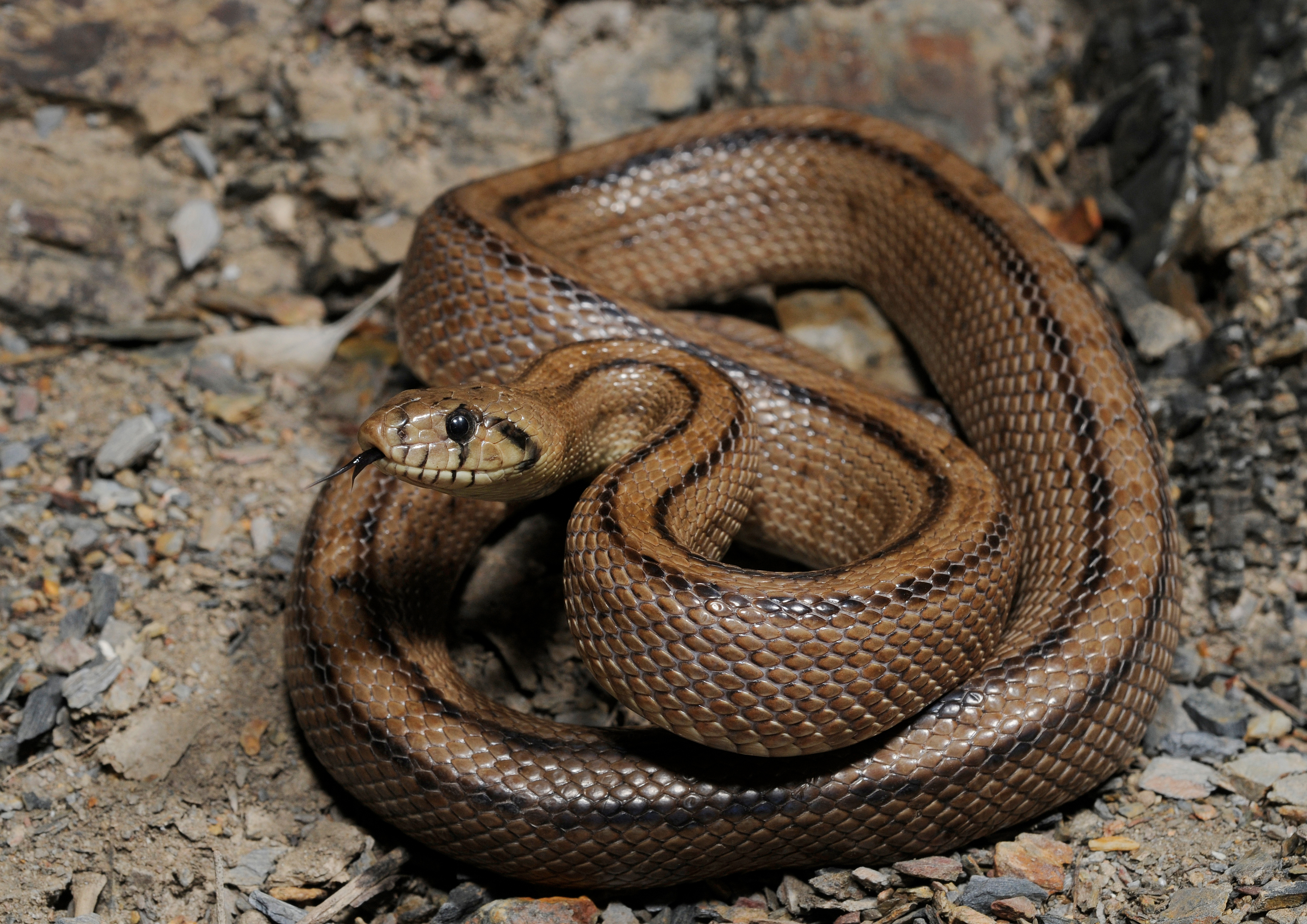
- From left to right in each row, top to bottom: tuatara (Rhynchocephalia), saltwater crocodile (Crocodilia), common box turtle (Testudines), ladder snake (Squamata)

Scientific classification
- Kingdom: Animalia
- Phylum: Chordata
- Clade: Sauropsida
- Class: Reptilia; Laurenti, 1768

Extant groups
- Lepidosauria; Rhynchocephalia (tuatara and relatives); Squamata (lizards and snakes); Archelosauria; Testudines (turtles); Archosauria; Crocodilia; Dinosauria (includes birds); See text for extinct groups.

Cladistically included but traditionally excluded taxa
- Aves (birds, nested within Dinosauria)

= Reptile =

Reptiles Temporal range: Late Carboniferous–Present

Class of animals

Reptiles, as commonly defined, are tetrapod vertebrate animals with an ectothermic metabolism and amniotic development. Reptiles traditionally comprise four orders: Testudines (turtles), Crocodilia, Squamata (lizards and snakes) and Rhynchocephalia (tuatara), with about 12,000 extant species listed in the Reptile Database. The study of the traditional reptile orders, customarily in combination with the study of modern amphibians, is called herpetology.

Reptiles have been subject to several conflicting taxonomic definitions. In classical evolutionary taxonomy, reptiles are gathered together under the class Reptilia (/rɛpˈtɪliə/ rep-TIL-ee-ə), which corresponds to common usage. Modern cladistic taxonomy regards that group as paraphyletic, since genetic and paleontological evidence has determined that birds (class Aves) are the only surviving group of Dinosauria, a major clade of diapsids that are more closely related to crocodilians than to other living reptiles, and thus birds are nested among reptiles (under the clade Archosauria) from a phylogenetic perspective. Many cladistic systems therefore redefine Reptilia as a clade (monophyletic group) including birds, though the precise definition of this clade varies between authors. A similar concept is clade Sauropsida, which refers to all amniotes more closely related to modern reptiles than to mammals.

The earliest known members of the reptile lineage appeared during the late Carboniferous period, having evolved from advanced reptiliomorph tetrapods which became increasingly adapted to life on dry land. Genetic and fossil data argues that the two largest lineages of reptiles, Archosauromorpha (crocodilians, birds, and kin) and Lepidosauromorpha (lizards, and kin), diverged during the Permian period. In addition to the living reptiles, there are many diverse groups that are now extinct, in some cases due to mass extinction events. In particular, the Cretaceous–Paleogene extinction event wiped out the pterosaurs, plesiosaurs, and all non-avian dinosaurs alongside many species of crocodyliforms and squamates (e.g., mosasaurs). Modern non-bird reptiles inhabit all the continents except Antarctica.

Extant reptiles range in size from the tiny Jaragua dwarf gecko (Sphaerodactylus ariasae), which only grow up to 17 mm (0.7 in); to the saltwater crocodile (Crocodylus porosus), which can reach over 6 m (19.7 ft) in length and weigh over 1,000 kg (2,200 lb). As tetrapods, reptiles generally have four limbs or, in the case of snakes and legless lizards, are descended from four-limbed ancestors but have lost the limbs through evolution. Unlike the anamniotic amphibians, reptiles do not rely on waterbodies for reproduction and have no aquatic larval stage. Most reptiles are oviparous with shelled eggs, although several species of squamates are viviparous, as were some extinct marine reptile clades. As amniotes, reptile eggs have extraembryonic membranes that retain water and facilitate biochemical exchange with the external environment, allowing reptiles to reproduce on dry land, even in extreme, arid habitats. Viviparous species have the eggs developing and hatching inside the mother's body, usually by internal incubation, although some species can nourish the eggs as fetuses through various forms of placenta analogs, with some providing initial parental care for their hatchlings.

== Classification ==
=== Classical taxonomy and research ===
Reptiles, from Nouveau Larousse Illustré, 1897–1904, notice the inclusion of amphibians (below the crocodilians)

In the 13th century, the category of reptile was recognized in Europe as consisting of a miscellany of egg-laying creatures, including "snakes, various fantastic monsters, lizards, assorted amphibians, and worms", as recorded by Beauvais in his Mirror of Nature. In the 18th century, the reptiles were, from the outset of classification, grouped with the amphibians. Linnaeus, working from species-poor Sweden, where the common adder and grass snake are often found hunting in water, included all reptiles and amphibians in class "III – Amphibia" in his Systema Naturæ. The terms reptile and amphibian were largely interchangeable, reptile (from Latin repere, 'to creep') being preferred by the French. J.N. Laurenti was the first to formally use the term Reptilia for an expanded selection of reptiles and amphibians basically similar to that of Linnaeus. Today, the two groups are still commonly treated under the single heading herpetology.

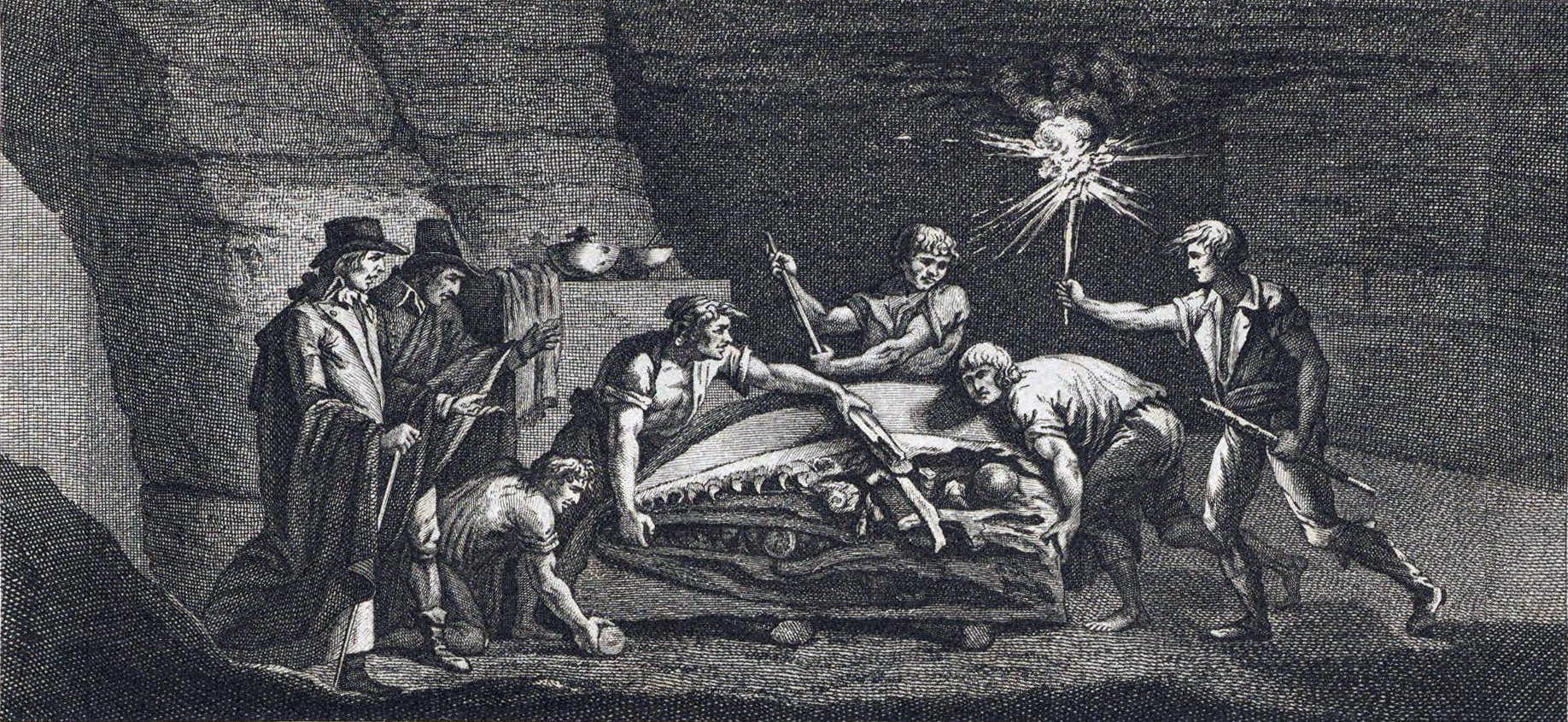
"Antediluvian monster", a Mosasaurus discovered in a Maastricht limestone quarry, 1770 (18th-century engraving)

It was not until the beginning of the 19th century that it became clear that reptiles and amphibians are, in fact, quite different animals, and P.A. Latreille erected the class Batracia (1825) for the latter, dividing the tetrapods into the four familiar classes of reptiles, amphibians, birds, and mammals. The British anatomist T.H. Huxley made Latreille's definition popular and, together with Richard Owen, expanded Reptilia to include the various fossil "antediluvian monsters", including dinosaurs and the mammal-like (synapsid) Dicynodon he helped describe. This was not the only possible classification scheme: In the Hunterian lectures delivered at the Royal College of Surgeons in 1863, Huxley grouped the vertebrates into mammals, sauroids, and ichthyoids (the latter containing the fishes and amphibians). He subsequently proposed the names of Sauropsida and Ichthyopsida for the latter two groups. In 1866, Haeckel demonstrated that vertebrates could be divided based on their reproductive strategies, and that reptiles, birds, and mammals were united by the amniotic egg.

The terms Sauropsida ("lizard faces") and Theropsida ("beast faces") were used again in 1916 by E.S. Goodrich to distinguish between lizards, birds, and their relatives on the one hand (Sauropsida) and mammals and their extinct relatives (Theropsida) on the other. Goodrich supported this division by the nature of the hearts and blood vessels in each group, and other features, such as the structure of the forebrain. According to Goodrich, both lineages evolved from an earlier stem group, Protosauria ("first lizards") in which he included some animals today considered reptile-like amphibians, as well as early reptiles.

In 1956, D.M.S. Watson observed that the first two groups diverged very early in reptilian history, so he divided Goodrich's Protosauria between them. He also reinterpreted Sauropsida and Theropsida to exclude birds and mammals, respectively. Thus his Sauropsida included Procolophonia, Eosuchia, Millerosauria, Chelonia (turtles), Squamata (lizards and snakes), Rhynchocephalia, Crocodilia, "thecodonts" (paraphyletic basal Archosauria), non-avian dinosaurs, pterosaurs, ichthyosaurs, and sauropterygians.

In the late 19th century, a number of definitions of Reptilia were offered. The biological traits listed by Lydekker in 1896, for example, include a single occipital condyle, a jaw joint formed by the quadrate and articular bones, and certain characteristics of the vertebrae. The animals singled out by these formulations, the amniotes other than the mammals and the birds, are still those considered reptiles today.

The synapsid/sauropsid division supplemented another approach, one that split the reptiles into four subclasses based on the number and position of temporal fenestrae, openings in the sides of the skull behind the eyes. This classification was initiated by Henry Fairfield Osborn and elaborated and made popular by Romer's classic Vertebrate Paleontology. Those four subclasses were:

- Anapsida – no fenestrae – cotylosaurs and chelonia (turtles and relatives) (Note: This taxonomy does not reflect modern molecular evidence, which places turtles within Diapsida.)
- Synapsida – one low fenestra – pelycosaurs and therapsids (the 'mammal-like reptiles')
- Euryapsida – one high fenestra (above the postorbital and squamosal) – protorosaurs (small, early lizard-like reptiles) and the marine sauropterygians and ichthyosaurs, the latter called Parapsida in Osborn's work.
- Diapsida – two fenestrae – most reptiles, including lizards, snakes, crocodilians, dinosaurs and pterosaurs.

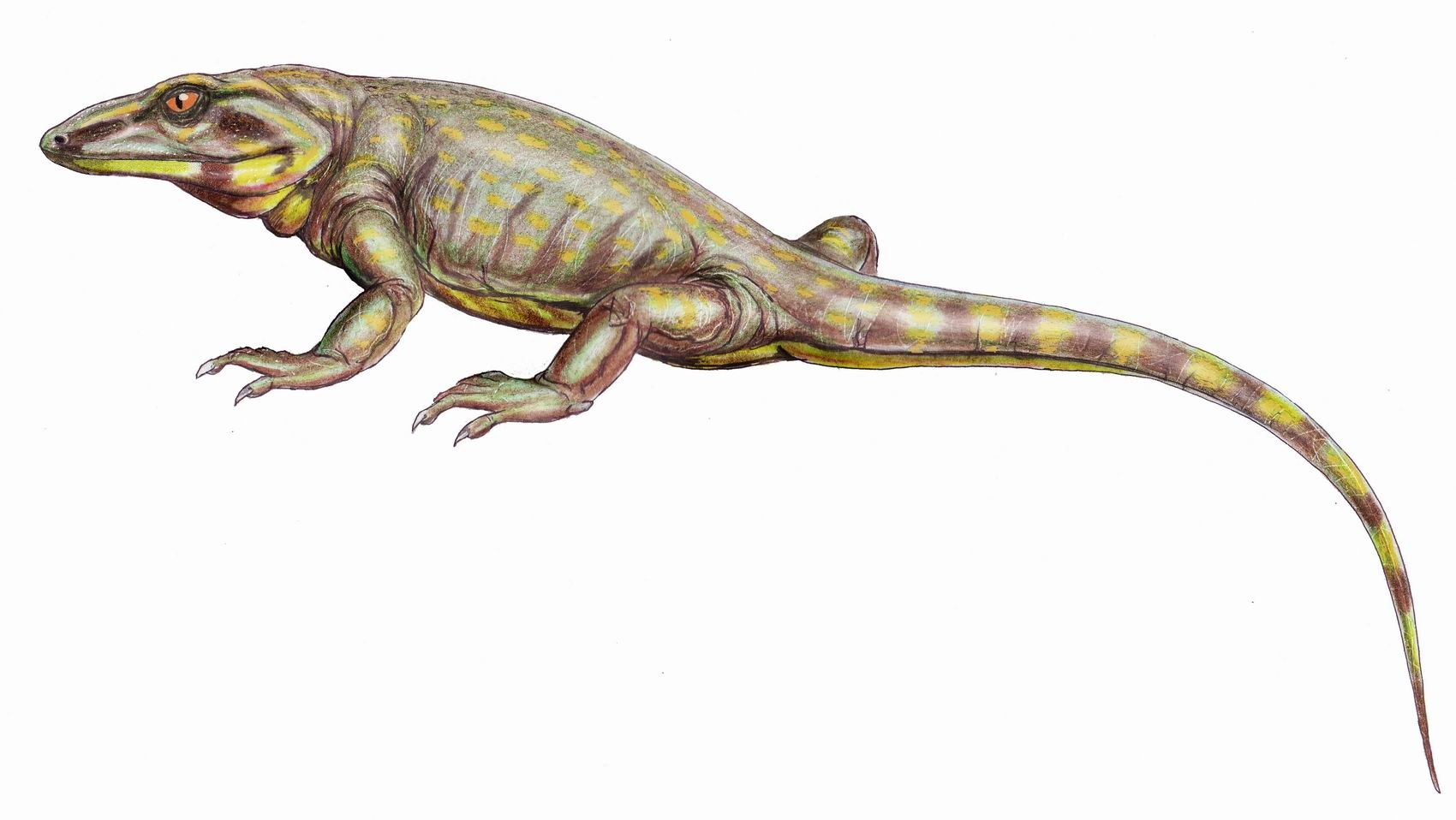
Phylogenetic classifications group the traditional "mammal-like reptiles", like this Varanodon, with other synapsids, not with extant reptiles

The composition of Euryapsida was uncertain. Ichthyosaurs were, at times, considered to have arisen independently of the other euryapsids, and given the older name Parapsida. Parapsida was later discarded as a group for the most part (ichthyosaurs being classified as incertae sedis or with Euryapsida). However, four (or three if Euryapsida is merged into Diapsida) subclasses remained more or less universal for non-specialist work throughout the 20th century. It has largely been abandoned by recent researchers: In particular, the anapsid condition has been found to occur so variably among unrelated groups that it is not now considered a useful distinction.

=== Phylogenetics and modern definition ===
By the early 21st century, vertebrate paleontologists were beginning to adopt phylogenetic taxonomy, in which all groups are defined in such a way as to be monophyletic; that is, groups which include all descendants of a particular ancestor. The reptiles as historically defined are paraphyletic, since they exclude both birds and mammals. These respectively evolved from dinosaurs and from early therapsids, both of which were traditionally called "reptiles". Birds are more closely related to crocodilians than the latter are to the rest of extant reptiles. Colin Tudge wrote:

Mammals are a clade, and therefore the cladists are happy to acknowledge the traditional taxon Mammalia; and birds, too, are a clade, universally ascribed to the formal taxon Aves. Mammalia and Aves are, in fact, subclades within the grand clade of the Amniota. But the traditional class Reptilia is not a clade. It is just a section of the clade Amniota: The section that is left after the Mammalia and Aves have been hived off. It cannot be defined by synapomorphies, as is the proper way. Instead, it is defined by a combination of the features it has and the features it lacks: reptiles are the amniotes that lack fur or feathers. At best, the cladists suggest, we could say that the traditional Reptilia are 'non-avian, non-mammalian amniotes'.

Despite the early proposals for replacing the paraphyletic Reptilia with a monophyletic Sauropsida, which includes birds, that term was never adopted widely or, when it was, was not applied consistently.

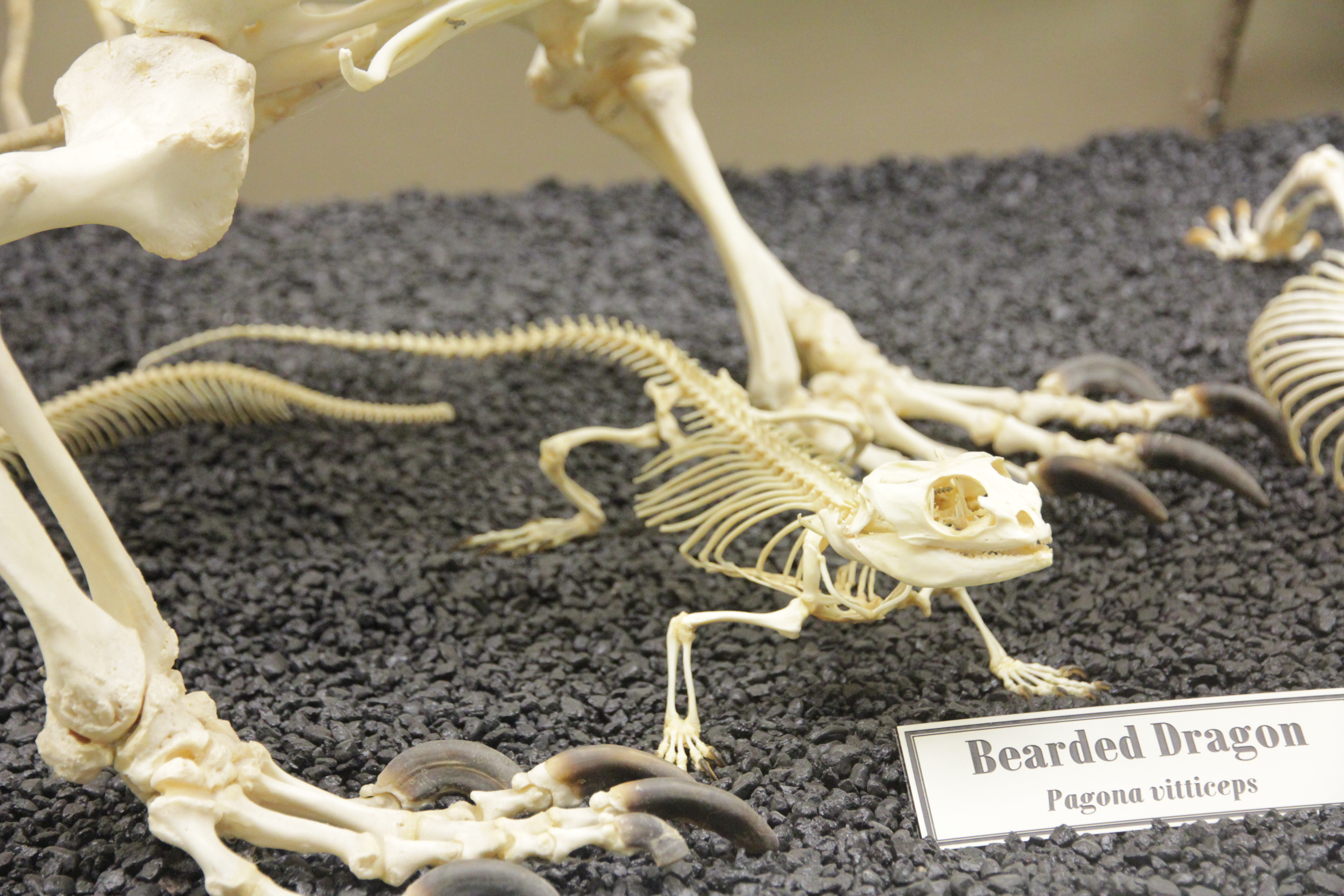
Bearded dragon (pogona) skeleton on display at the Museum of Osteology

When Sauropsida was used, it often had the same content or even the same definition as Reptilia. In 1988, Jacques Gauthier proposed a cladistic definition of Reptilia as a monophyletic node-based crown group containing turtles, lizards and snakes, crocodilians, and birds, their common ancestor and all its descendants. While Gauthier's definition was close to the modern consensus, nonetheless, it became considered inadequate because the actual relationship of turtles to other reptiles was not yet well understood at this time. Major revisions since have included the reassignment of synapsids as non-reptiles, and classification of turtles as diapsids. Gauthier 1994 and Laurin and Reisz 1995's definition of Sauropsida defined the scope of the group as distinct and broader than that of Reptilia, encompassing Mesosauridae as well as Reptilia sensu stricto.

A variety of other definitions were proposed by other scientists in the years following Gauthier's paper. The first such new definition, which attempted to adhere to the standards of the PhyloCode, was published by Modesto and Anderson in 2004. Modesto and Anderson reviewed the many previous definitions and proposed a modified definition, which they intended to retain most traditional content of the group while keeping it stable and monophyletic. They defined Reptilia as all amniotes closer to Lacerta agilis and Crocodylus niloticus than to Homo sapiens. This stem-based definition is equivalent to the more common definition of Sauropsida, which Modesto and Anderson synonymized with Reptilia, since the latter is better known and more frequently used. Unlike most previous definitions of Reptilia, however, Modesto and Anderson's definition includes birds, as they are within the clade that includes both lizards and crocodilians.

=== Taxonomy ===
General classification of extinct and living reptiles, focusing on major groups.

- Sauropsida/ Reptilia sensu lato
  - †Araeoscelidia?
  - †Parareptilia (polyphyletic)
    - Diapsida/Neodiapsida
      - †Drepanosauromorpha (placement uncertain)
      - †Younginiformes (likely paraphyletic)
      - †Ichthyosauromorpha (placement uncertain)
      - †Thalattosauria (placement uncertain)
      - †Sauropterygia (placement uncertain)
      - †Choristodera (placement uncertain)
      - †Kuehneosauridae (placement uncertain)
      - Sauria/ Reptilia sensu stricto
        - Lepidosauromorpha
          - Lepidosauria
            - Rhynchocephalia (tuatara)
            - Squamata (lizards and snakes)
        - Pantestudines (turtles and kin, placement uncertain)
        - Archosauromorpha
          - †Protorosauria (paraphyletic)
          - †Rhynchosauria
          - †Allokotosauria
          - Archosauriformes
            - †Phytosauria
            - Archosauria
              - Pseudosuchia
                - Crocodilia (crocodilians)
              - Avemetatarsalia/Ornithodira
                - †Pterosauria
                - Dinosauria
                  - †Ornithischia
                  - Saurischia (including birds (Aves))

=== Phylogeny ===
The cladogram presented here illustrates the "family tree" of reptiles, and follows a simplified version of the relationships found by M.S. Lee, in 2013. All genetic studies have supported the hypothesis that turtles are diapsids; some have placed turtles within Archosauromorpha, though a few have recovered turtles as Lepidosauromorpha instead. The cladogram below used a combination of genetic (molecular) and fossil (morphological) data to obtain its results.

- Amniota
  - Synapsida (mammals and their extinct relatives)
  - Sauropsida / Reptilia (total group)
    - †Parareptilia
      - †Millerettidae
      - unnamed
        - †Eunotosaurus
        - †Ankyramorpha
          - †Lanthanosuchidae
          - †Procolophonia
            - †Pareiasauromorpha
            - †Procolophonoidea
    - Eureptilia
      - †Captorhinidae
      - Romeriida
        - †Paleothyris
        - Diapsida
          - †Araeoscelidia
          - Neodiapsida
            - †Claudiosaurus
            - - †Younginiformes
              - Crown Reptilia/ Sauria
                - Pan-Lepidosauria/ Lepidosauromorpha
                  - †Kuehneosauridae
                  - Lepidosauria
                    - Rhynchocephalia (tuatara and their extinct relatives)
                    - Squamata (lizards and snakes)
                - Archelosauria/ Archosauromorpha s. l.
                  - Pan-Testudines/ Pantestudines
                    - †Eosauropterygia
                    - - †Placodontia
                      - - †Sinosaurosphargis
                        - - †Odontochelys
                          - Testudinata
                            - †Proganochelys
                            - Testudines (turtles)
                  - Pan-Archosauria
                    - †Choristodera
                    - Archosauromorpha s. s.
                      - †Prolacertiformes
                      - - - †Rhynchosauria
                          - †Trilophosaurus
                        - Archosauriformes (crocodilians, birds, dinosaurs and extinct relatives)

Cladogram after Simões et al. 2022

- Sauropsida
  - †Acleistorhinidae
  - - †Millerettidae
    - - †Mesosauria
      - - †Procolophonia
        - Neodiapsida
          - †Younginiformes
          - - †Eunotosaurus
            - - †Weigeltisauridae
              - Sauria
                - Lepidosauromorpha
                  - Rhynchocephalia (tuatara and their extinct relatives)
                  - Squamata (lizards and snakes)
                - Archelosauria
                  - Pantestudines (turtles and extinct relatives)
                  - Archosauromorpha
                    - - †Ichthyosauromorpha
                      - - †Sauropterygia
                        - †Thalattosauria
                    - - †Protorosauria
                        - †Protorosauridae
                        - - †Tanystropheidae
                          - - †Drepanosauromorpha
                            - †Kuehneosauridae
                      - - - †Allokotosauria
                          - †Rhynchosauria
                        - Archosauriformes (crocodilians, birds, and their extinct relatives)

Revised view after the parsimony analysis of Jenkins et al. 2026.

- Sauropsida Reptilia s.l.
  - †Araeoscelidia
  - - †Bolosauridae
    - - †Ankyramorpha
        - †Acleistorhinidae
        - †Procolophonia
          - †Pareiasauromorpha
          - †Procolophonoidea
      - - †Mesosauria
        - - - †Ascendonanus
            - †Orovenator
            - †Cabarzia
          - Parapleurota
            - †Millerettidae (including Eunotosaurus)
            - Neodiapsida
              - †Saurosternon
              - - †Younginidae
                - - †Tangasauridae
                  - - †Claudiosaurus
                    - - †Weigeltisauridae
                      - †Drepanosauromorpha
                      - Sauria Reptilia s. s.
                        - Lepidosauromorpha
                          - †Paliguana
                          - - †Sophineta
                            - - - †Marmoretta
                                - †Megachirella
                              - Lepidosauria
                                - Squamata
                                - Rhynchocephalia
                        - Archosauromorpha
                          - †Sauropterygia (including Plesiosauria)
                          - - †Protorosaurus
                            - Archelosauria
                              - Pantestudines
                              - - †Tanystropheidae
                                - - †Prolacerta
                                  - - †Allokotosauria
                                    - - †Rhynchosauria
                                      - - †Teyujagua
                                        - Archosauriformes (including Archosauria)

=== The position of turtles ===
The placement of turtles has historically been highly variable. Classically, turtles were considered to be related to the primitive anapsid reptiles. In their comparative analysis of the timing of organogenesis, Werneburg and Sánchez-Villagra (2009) found support for the hypothesis that turtles belong to a separate clade within Sauropsida, outside the saurian clade altogether. Molecular work has usually placed turtles within the diapsids. As of 2013, three turtle genomes have been sequenced. The results place turtles as a sister clade to the archosaurs, the group that includes crocodilians, non-avian dinosaurs, and birds. A 2026 study found that they were nested within Archosauromorpha, with strong morphological support.

== Evolutionary history ==
=== Origin of the reptiles ===
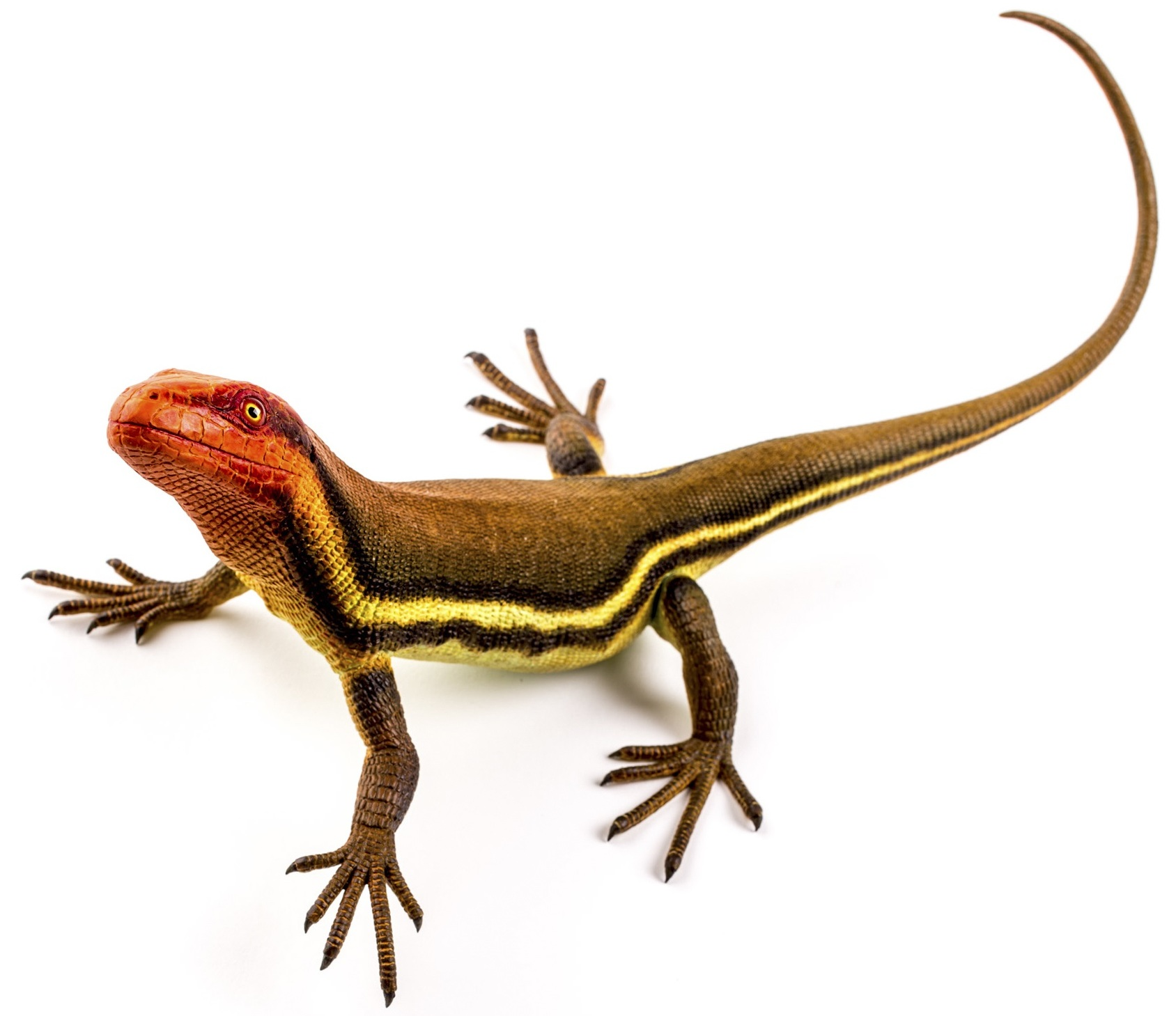
Restoration of Hylonomus from the Late Carboniferous of Canada, traditionally considered the oldest known reptile, but whose placement in the group has recently been questioned.

The origin of the reptiles lies about 310–320 million years ago, in the steaming swamps of the late Carboniferous period, when the first reptiles evolved from advanced reptiliomorphs.

The oldest known animal that may have been an amniote is Casineria (though it may have been a temnospondyl). A series of footprints from the fossil strata of Nova Scotia dated to 315 Ma show typical reptilian toes and imprints of scales. These tracks are now attributed to Hylonomus, historically widely regarded as the oldest known reptile, but whose placement in the group has been recently questioned. It was a small, lizard-like animal, about 20 to 30 centimetres (7.9 to 11.8 in) long, with numerous sharp teeth indicating an insectivorous diet. Other examples include Westlothiana (currently considered a reptiliomorph rather than a true amniote) and Paleothyris, both of similar build and presumably similar habit.

However, microsaurs have been at times considered true reptiles, so an earlier origin is possible. Among the unambiguous true reptiles from the Carboniferous are Erpetonyx and Carbonodraco, both from North America.

=== Rise of the reptiles ===
The earliest amniotes, including stem-reptiles (those amniotes closer to modern reptiles than to mammals), were largely overshadowed by larger stem-tetrapods, such as Cochleosaurus, and remained a small, inconspicuous part of the fauna until the Carboniferous Rainforest Collapse. This sudden collapse affected several large groups. Primitive tetrapods were particularly devastated, while stem-reptiles fared better, being ecologically adapted to the drier conditions that followed. Primitive tetrapods, like modern amphibians, need to return to water to lay eggs; in contrast, amniotes, like modern reptiles – whose eggs possess a shell that allows them to be laid on land – were better adapted to the new conditions. Amniotes acquired new niches at a faster rate than before the collapse and at a much faster rate than primitive tetrapods. They acquired new feeding strategies including herbivory and carnivory, previously only having been insectivores and piscivores. From this point forward, reptiles dominated communities and had a greater diversity than primitive tetrapods, setting the stage for the Mesozoic (known as the Age of Reptiles).

A 2021 examination of reptile diversity in the Carboniferous and the Permian suggests a much higher degree of diversity than previously thought, comparable or even exceeding that of synapsids. Thus, the "First Age of Reptiles" was proposed.

=== Anapsids, synapsids, diapsids, and sauropsids ===
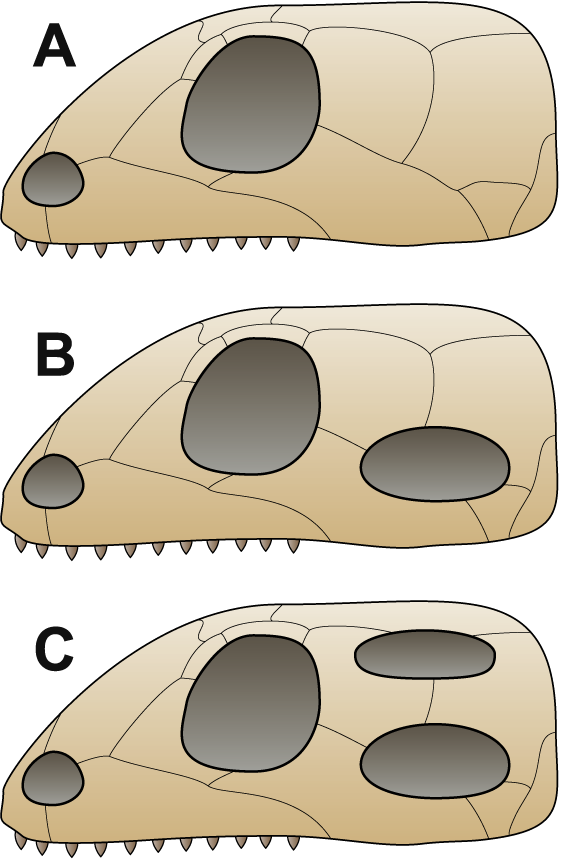
A = Anapsid, B = Synapsid, C = Diapsid

It was traditionally assumed that the first reptiles retained an anapsid skull inherited from their ancestors. This type of skull has a skull roof with only holes for the nostrils, eyes and a pineal eye. The discoveries of synapsid-like openings (see below) in the skull roof of the skulls of several members of Parareptilia (the group containing most of the amniotes traditionally referred to as "anapsids"), including lanthanosuchoids, millerettids, bolosaurids, some nycteroleterids, some procolophonoids and at least some mesosaurs made it more ambiguous and it is currently uncertain whether the ancestral amniote had an anapsid-like or synapsid-like skull. These animals are traditionally referred to as "anapsids", and form a paraphyletic basic stock from which other groups evolved. Very shortly after the first amniotes appeared, a lineage called Synapsida split off; this group was characterized by a temporal opening in the skull behind each eye giving room for the jaw muscle to move. These are the "mammal-like amniotes", or stem-mammals, that later gave rise to the true mammals. Soon after, another group evolved a similar trait, this time with a double opening behind each eye, earning them the name Diapsida ("two arches"). The function of the holes in these groups was to lighten the skull and give room for the jaw muscles to move, allowing for a more powerful bite. Historically, while the late Carboniferous-early Permian lizard-like reptile group Araeoscelidia, which are (generally) morphologically diapsid, were considered to be the earliest representatives of the clade Diapsida, phylogenetic studies from the 2020s has brought into serious doubt their relationship with other diapsids (Neodiapsida), and they have been found as very early diverging branch of Reptilia or even outside of Reptilia entirely.

Turtles have been traditionally believed to be surviving parareptiles, on the basis of their anapsid skull structure, which was assumed to be primitive trait. The rationale for this classification has been disputed, with some arguing that turtles are diapsids that evolved anapsid skulls, improving their armor. Later morphological phylogenetic studies with this in mind placed turtles firmly within Diapsida. All molecular studies have strongly upheld the placement of turtles within diapsids, most commonly as a sister group to extant archosaurs.

=== Permian reptiles ===
With the close of the Carboniferous, the amniotes became the dominant tetrapod fauna. While primitive, terrestrial reptiliomorphs still existed, the synapsid amniotes evolved the first truly terrestrial megafauna (giant animals) in the form of pelycosaurs, such as Edaphosaurus and the carnivorous Dimetrodon. In the mid-Permian period, the climate became drier, resulting in a change of fauna: The pelycosaurs were replaced by the therapsids.

Many stem reptile groups continued to flourish throughout the Permian. The herbivorous pareiasaurs were the first lineage of reptiles to reach a large body size, with the largest representatives of the group having a body mass estimated to exceed 1,000 kilograms (2,200 lb). One of the best known early stem-reptiles is Mesosaurus, a genus from the Early Permian of Southern Africa and South America that had returned to water and gained webbed feet, feeding on crustaceans in marine or lagoonal environments. The earliest true diapsids (Neodiapsida), such as Youngina, appeared during the Middle-Late Permian. The Weigeltisauridae, a group of diapsids from the Late Permian, are the oldest known tetrapods to have engaged in flight, using novel rod-like bones extending from the trunk which formed wings to glide between trees. The ancestors of modern reptiles (which belong to the clade Sauria) had diverged from each other by the Late Permian, as evidenced by species such as the monitor lizard-like Protorosaurus known from the Late Permian of Europe, which is clearly an archosauromorph, more closely related to archosaurs (crocodilians and birds) than to lizards, snakes or turtles.

=== Mesozoic reptiles ===
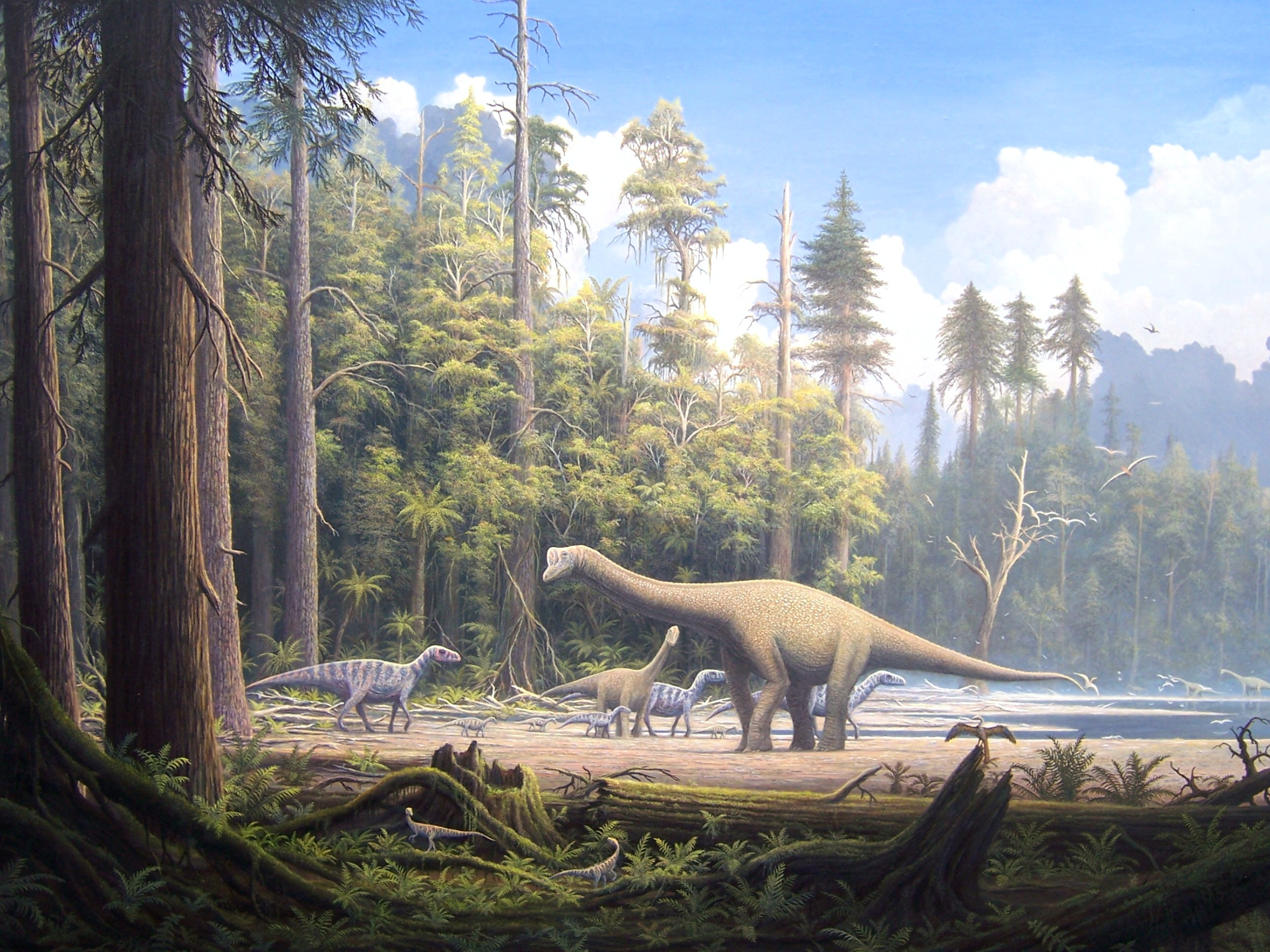
Mesozoic scene showing typical reptilian megafauna: dinosaurs including Europasaurus holgeri, iguanodonts, and Archaeopteryx lithographica perched on the foreground tree stump

The close of the Permian saw the greatest mass extinction known (see the Permian–Triassic extinction event), an event prolonged by the combination of two or more distinct extinction pulses. Most of the earlier parareptile and synapsid megafauna disappeared, being replaced by the true reptiles, particularly archosauromorphs. These were characterized by elongated hind legs and an erect pose, the early forms looking somewhat like long-legged crocodiles. The archosaurs became the dominant group during the Triassic period, though it took 30 million years before their diversity was as great as the animals that lived in the Permian. Archosaurs developed into the well-known dinosaurs and pterosaurs, as well as the ancestors of crocodilians. Since reptiles, first rauisuchians and then dinosaurs, dominated the Mesozoic era, the interval is popularly known as the "Age of Reptiles". The dinosaurs also developed smaller forms, including the feather-bearing smaller theropods. In the Cretaceous period, these gave rise to the first true birds.

The sister group to Archosauromorpha is Lepidosauromorpha, containing lizards and tuataras, as well as their fossil relatives. Lepidosauromorpha contained at least one major group of the Mesozoic sea reptiles: the mosasaurs, which lived during the Cretaceous period. The phylogenetic placement of other main groups of fossil sea reptiles – the ichthyopterygians (including ichthyosaurs) and the sauropterygians, which evolved in the early Triassic – is more controversial. Different authors linked these groups either to lepidosauromorphs or to archosauromorphs, and ichthyopterygians were also argued to be diapsids that did not belong to the least inclusive clade containing lepidosauromorphs and archosauromorphs.

=== Cenozoic reptiles ===
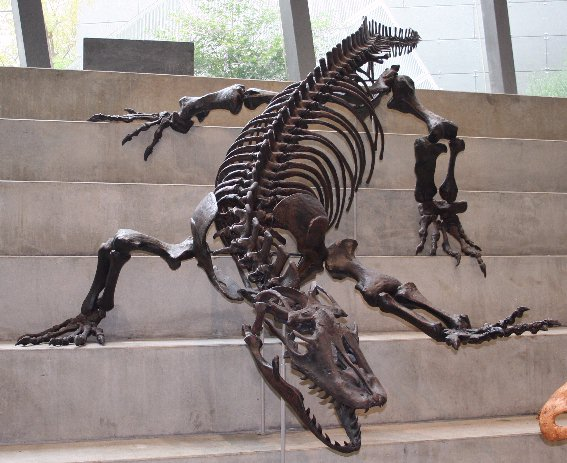
Varanus priscus was a giant carnivorous goanna lizard, perhaps as long as 7 metres and weighing up to 1,940 kilograms

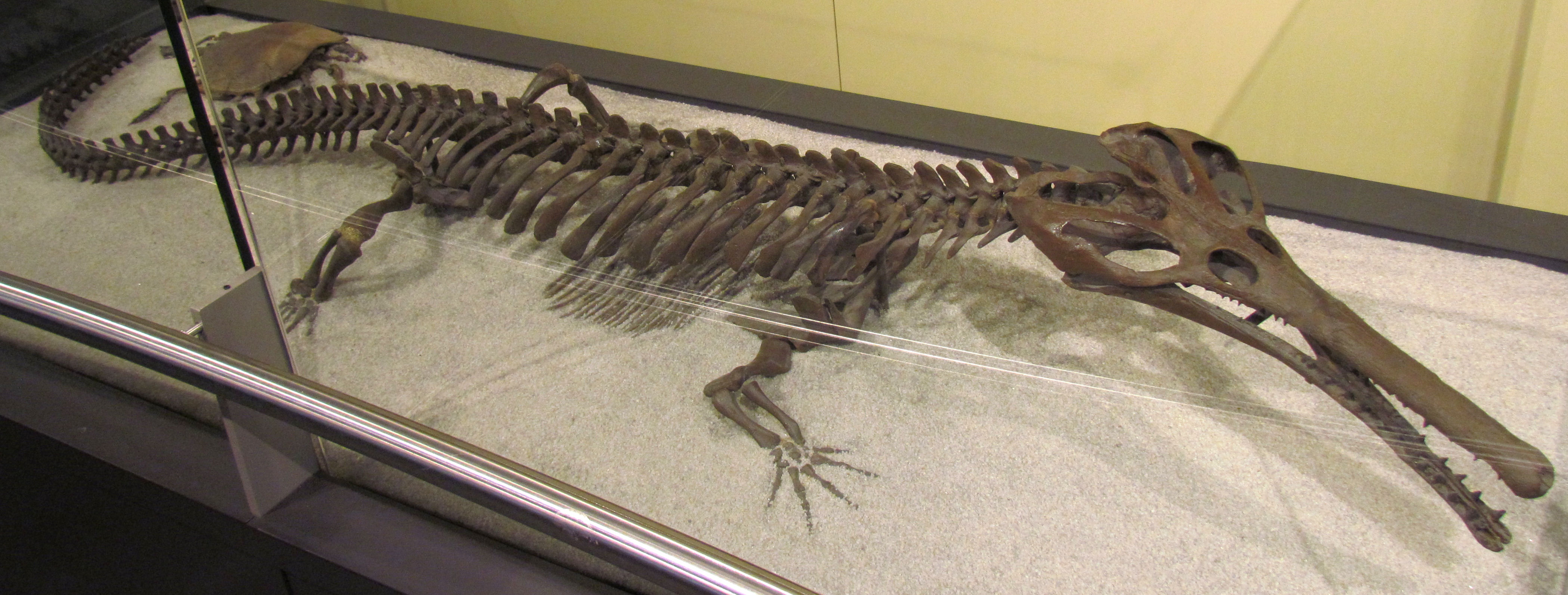
Skeleton of Champsosaurus, a choristodere, the latest surviving order of extinct reptiles. The last known choristoderes are known from the Miocene, around 11.3 million years ago

The close of the Cretaceous period saw the demise of the Mesozoic era reptilian megafauna (see the Cretaceous–Paleogene extinction event, also known as K-T extinction event). Of the large marine reptiles, only sea turtles were left; and of the non-marine large reptiles, only the semi-aquatic crocodilians and broadly similar choristoderes survived the extinction, with last members of the latter, the lizard-like Lazarussuchus, becoming extinct in the Miocene. Of the great host of dinosaurs dominating the Mesozoic, only the small beaked birds survived. This dramatic extinction pattern at the end of the Mesozoic led into the Cenozoic. Mammals and birds filled the empty niches left behind by the reptilian megafauna and, while reptile diversification slowed, bird and mammal diversification took an exponential turn. However, reptiles were still important components of the megafauna, particularly in the form of large and giant tortoises.

After the extinction of most archosaur and marine reptile lines by the end of the Cretaceous, reptile diversification continued throughout the Cenozoic. Squamates took a massive hit during the K–Pg event, only recovering ten million years after it, but they underwent a great radiation event once they recovered, and today squamates make up the majority of living reptiles (> 95%). Approximately 10,000 extant species of traditional reptiles are known, with birds adding about 10,000 more, almost twice the number of mammals, represented by about 5,700 living species (excluding domesticated species).

Species diversity of living reptiles (2013)
Reptile group	Described species	Percent of reptile species
Squamates	9193	96.3%
Lizards	5634	59%
Snakes	3378	35%
Amphisbaenians	181	2%
Turtles	327	3.4%
Crocodilians	25	0.3%
Rhynchocephalians	1	0.01%
Total	9546	100%

== Morphology and physiology ==
=== Circulation ===
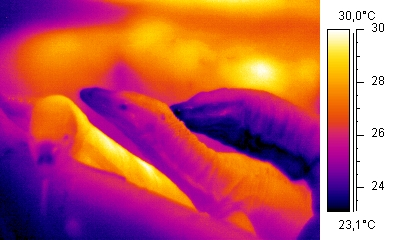
Thermographic image of monitor lizards

All lepidosaurs and turtles have a three-chambered heart consisting of two atria, one variably partitioned ventricle, and two aortas that lead to the systemic circulation. The degree of mixing of oxygenated and deoxygenated blood in the three-chambered heart varies depending on the species and physiological state. Under different conditions, deoxygenated blood can be shunted back to the body or oxygenated blood can be shunted back to the lungs. This variation in blood flow has been hypothesized to allow more effective thermoregulation and longer diving times for aquatic species, but has not been shown to be a fitness advantage.

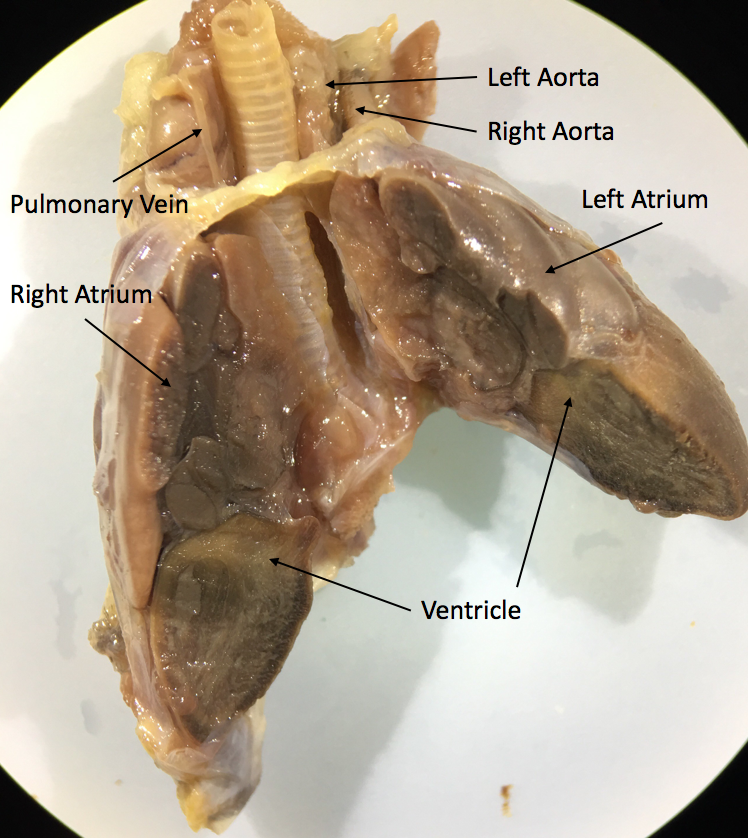
Juvenile iguana heart bisected through the ventricle, bisecting the left and right atrium

For example, iguana hearts, like the majority of the squamate hearts, are composed of three chambers–two atria and one ventricle–and cardiac involuntary muscles. The main structures of the heart are the sinus venosus, the pacemaker, the left atrium, the right atrium, the atrioventricular valve, the cavum venosum, cavum arteriosum, the cavum pulmonale, the muscular ridge, the ventricular ridge, pulmonary veins, and paired aortic arches.

Some squamate species (e.g., pythons and monitor lizards) have three-chambered hearts that become functionally four-chambered hearts during contraction. This is made possible by a muscular ridge that subdivides the ventricle during ventricular diastole and completely divides it during ventricular systole. Because of this ridge, some of these squamates are capable of producing ventricular pressure differentials that are equivalent to those seen in mammalian and avian hearts.

Crocodilians have an anatomically four-chambered heart, similar to birds, but also have two systemic aortas and are therefore capable of bypassing their pulmonary circulation. In turtles, the ventricle is not perfectly divided, so a mix of aerated and nonaerated blood can occur.

=== Metabolism ===
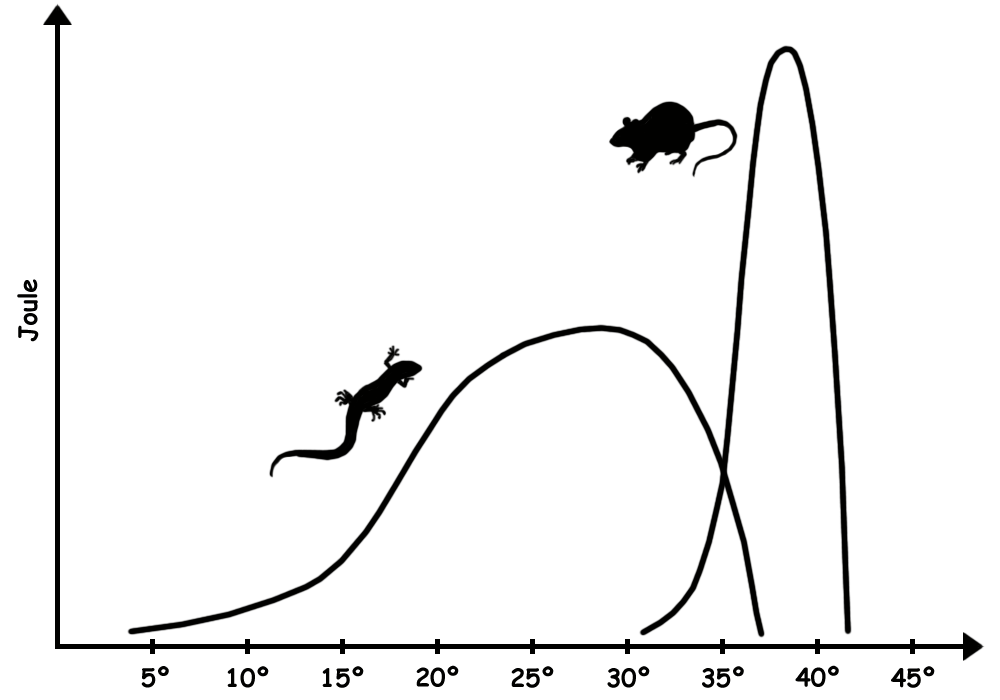
Sustained energy output (joules) of a typical reptile versus a similar size mammal as a function of core body temperature. The mammal has a much higher peak output, but can only function over a very narrow range of body temperature.

Modern non-avian reptiles exhibit some form of cold-bloodedness (i.e. some mix of poikilothermy, ectothermy, and bradymetabolism) so that they have limited physiological means of keeping the body temperature constant and often rely on external sources of heat. Due to a less stable core temperature than birds and mammals, reptilian biochemistry requires enzymes capable of maintaining efficiency over a greater range of temperatures than in the case for warm-blooded animals. The optimum body temperature range varies with species, but is typically below that of warm-blooded animals; for many lizards, it falls in the 24–35 °C (75–95 °F) range, while extreme heat-adapted species, like the American desert iguana Dipsosaurus dorsalis, can have optimal physiological temperatures in the mammalian range, between 35 and 40 °C (95 and 104 °F). While the optimum temperature is often encountered when the animal is active, the low basal metabolism makes body temperature drop rapidly when the animal is inactive.

As in all animals, reptilian muscle action produces heat. In large reptiles, like leatherback turtles, the low surface-to-volume ratio allows this metabolically produced heat to keep the animals warmer than their environment even though they do not have a warm-blooded metabolism. This form of homeothermy is called gigantothermy; it has been suggested as having been common in large dinosaurs and other extinct large-bodied reptiles.

The benefit of a low resting metabolism is that it requires far less fuel to sustain bodily functions. By using temperature variations in their surroundings, or by remaining cold when they do not need to move, reptiles can save considerable amounts of energy compared to endothermic animals of the same size. A crocodile needs from a tenth to a fifth of the food necessary for a lion of the same weight and can live half a year without eating. Lower food requirements and adaptive metabolisms allow reptiles to dominate the animal life in regions where net calorie availability is too low to sustain large-bodied mammals and birds.

It is generally assumed that reptiles are unable to produce the sustained high energy output necessary for long distance chases or flying. Higher energetic capacity might have been responsible for the evolution of warm-bloodedness in birds and mammals. However, investigation of correlations between active capacity and thermophysiology show a weak relationship. Most extant reptiles are carnivores with a sit-and-wait feeding strategy; whether reptiles are cold blooded due to their ecology is not clear. Energetic studies on some reptiles have shown active capacities equal to or greater than similar sized warm-blooded animals.

=== Respiratory system ===
X-ray fluoroscopy videos of a female American alligator showing contraction of the lungs while breathing

All reptiles breathe using lungs. Aquatic turtles have developed more permeable skin, and some species have modified their cloaca to increase the area for gas exchange. Even with these adaptations, breathing is never fully accomplished without lungs. Lung ventilation is accomplished differently in each main reptile group. In squamates, the lungs are ventilated almost exclusively by the axial musculature. This is also the same musculature that is used during locomotion. Because of this constraint, most squamates are forced to hold their breath during intense runs. Some, however, have found a way around it. Varanids, and a few other lizard species, employ buccal pumping as a complement to their normal "axial breathing". This allows the animals to completely fill their lungs during intense locomotion, and thus remain aerobically active for a long time. Tegu lizards are known to possess a proto-diaphragm, which separates the pulmonary cavity from the visceral cavity. While not actually capable of movement, it does allow for greater lung inflation, by taking the weight of the viscera off the lungs.

Crocodilians actually have a muscular diaphragm that is analogous to the mammalian diaphragm. The difference is that the muscles for the crocodilian diaphragm pull the pubis (part of the pelvis, which is movable in crocodilians) back, which brings the liver down, thus freeing space for the lungs to expand. This type of diaphragmatic setup has been referred to as the "hepatic piston". The airways form a number of double tubular chambers within each lung. On inhalation and exhalation air moves through the airways in the same direction, thus creating a unidirectional airflow through the lungs. A similar system is found in birds, monitor lizards and iguanas.

Most reptiles lack a secondary palate, meaning that they must hold their breath while swallowing. Crocodilians have evolved a bony secondary palate that allows them to continue breathing while remaining submerged (and protect their brains against damage by struggling prey). Skinks (family Scincidae) also have evolved a bony secondary palate, to varying degrees. Snakes took a different approach and extended their trachea instead. Their tracheal extension sticks out like a fleshy straw, and allows these animals to swallow large prey without suffering from asphyxiation.

==== Turtles and tortoises ====
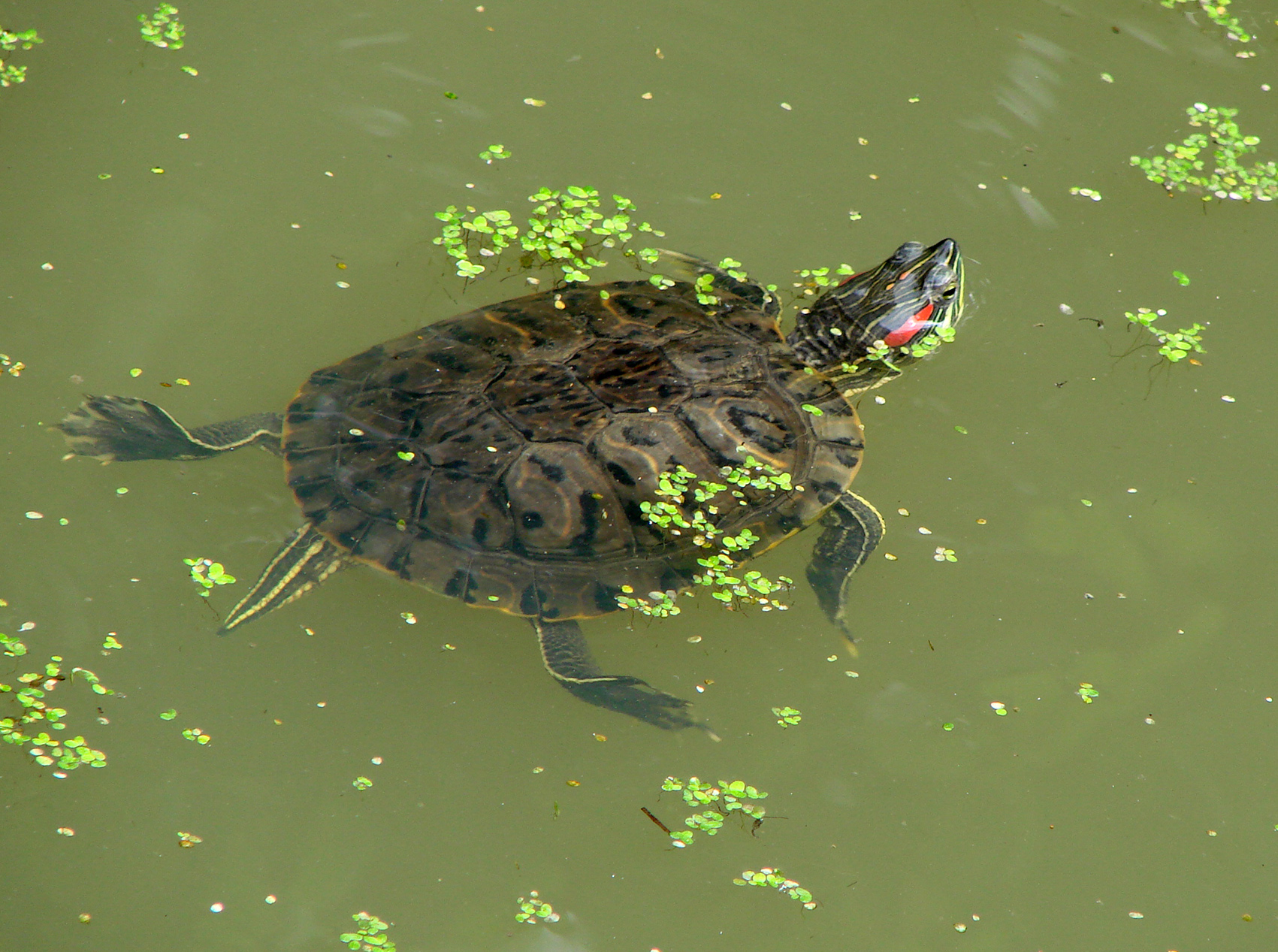
Red-eared slider taking a gulp of air

How turtles breathe has been the subject of much study. To date, only a few species have been studied thoroughly enough to get an idea of how those turtles breathe. The varied results indicate that turtles have found a variety of solutions to this problem.

The difficulty is that most turtle shells are rigid and do not allow for the type of expansion and contraction that other amniotes use to ventilate their lungs. Some turtles, such as the Indian flapshell (Lissemys punctata), have a sheet of muscle that envelops the lungs. When it contracts, the turtle can exhale. When at rest, the turtle can retract the limbs into the body cavity and force air out of the lungs. When the turtle protracts its limbs, the pressure inside the lungs is reduced, and the turtle can suck air in. Turtle lungs are attached to the inside of the top of the shell (carapace), with the bottom of the lungs attached (via connective tissue) to the rest of the viscera. By using a series of special muscles (roughly equivalent to a diaphragm), turtles are capable of pushing their viscera up and down, resulting in effective respiration, since many of these muscles have attachment points in conjunction with their forelimbs (indeed, many of the muscles expand into the limb pockets during contraction).

Breathing during locomotion has been studied in three species, and they show different patterns. Adult female green sea turtles do not breathe as they crutch along their nesting beaches. They hold their breath during terrestrial locomotion and breathe in bouts as they rest. North American box turtles breathe continuously during locomotion, and the ventilation cycle is not coordinated with the limb movements. This is because they use their abdominal muscles to breathe during locomotion. The last species to have been studied is the red-eared slider, which also breathes during locomotion, but takes smaller breaths during locomotion than during small pauses between locomotor bouts, indicating that there may be mechanical interference between the limb movements and the breathing apparatus. Box turtles have also been observed to breathe while completely sealed up inside their shells.

=== Sound production ===
Compared with frogs, birds, and mammals, reptiles are less vocal. Sound production is usually limited to hissing, which is produced merely by forcing air though a partly closed glottis and is not considered to be a true vocalization. The ability to vocalize exists in crocodilians, some lizards and turtles; and typically involves vibrating fold-like structures in the larynx or glottis. Some geckos and turtles possess true vocal cords, which have elastin-rich connective tissue.

==== Hearing in snakes ====
Hearing in humans relies on 3 parts of the ear; the outer ear that directs sound waves into the ear canal, the middle ear that transmits incoming sound waves to the inner ear, and the inner ear that helps in hearing and keeping their balance. Unlike humans and other mammals, snakes do not possess an outer ear, a middle ear, and a tympanum but have an inner ear structure with cochleas directly connected to their jawbone. They are able to feel the vibrations generated from the sound waves in their jaw as they move on the ground. This is done by the use of mechanoreceptors, sensory nerves that run along the body of snakes directing the vibrations along the spinal nerves to the brain. Snakes have a sensitive auditory perception and can tell which direction sound being made is coming from so that they can sense the presence of prey or predator but it is still unclear how sensitive snakes are to sound waves traveling through the air.

=== Skin and claws ===
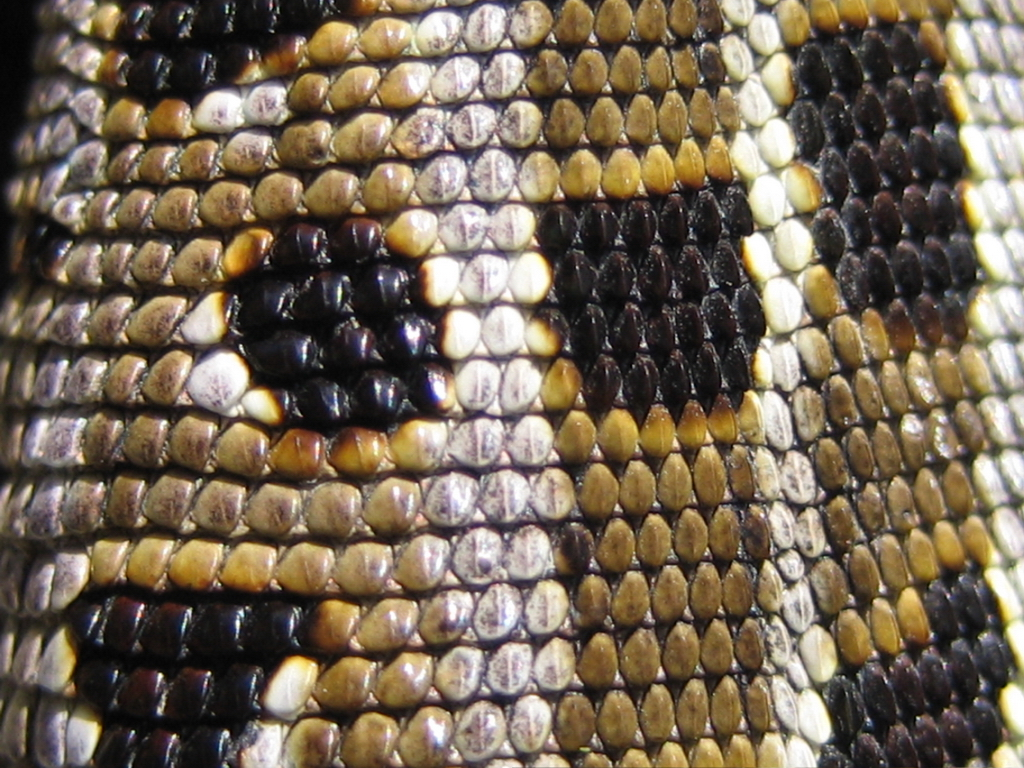
Skin of a sand lizard, showing squamate reptiles iconic scales

Reptilian skin is covered in a horny cornified epidermis, making it watertight and enabling reptiles to live on dry land, in contrast to amphibians. Compared to mammalian skin, that of reptiles is rather thin and lacks the thick dermal layer that produces leather in mammals. The scaly skin typical of reptiles was likely inherited from the mutual common ancestor of amniotes, as early synapsids (as well as close relatives of amniotes like diadectomorphs) also had scaly reptile-like skin. This epidermis has differentiated alpha- and beta-keratin layers. Reptile skin varies from being highly pliable (snakes, geckoes) to inflexible (crocodilians, many turtles, many lepidosaurs) and the scales from highly overlapping (skinks and snakes) to having very little overlap (crocodilians, geckoes and agamids). Some areas of the body may not covered in scales (such as large areas of the body in turtles), but still generally have a rough appearance. Large plate-like scales, such as those covering the shells of turtles and the bodies of crocodilians, are referred to as scutes. The tips of reptile digits are generally capped with hard, curved cornified claws.

==== Shedding ====
Reptiles shed their skin continuously throughout their lifetime. Lepidosaurians (lizards, snakes and the tuatara) tend to shed large pieces or the entire body covering of the skin all at once (or alternatively over a longer timespan of a few days to a few weeks), while crocodilians and turtles tend to continuously shed their skin, with small flakes coming off at irregular intervals. Shedding frequency can vary due to a number of factors, such as higher temperatures resulting in increased shedding rates. Some reptiles will consume their own shed skin. Younger reptiles shed more because of their rapid growth rate. Once full size, the frequency of shedding drastically decreases. The process of shedding involves forming a new layer of skin under the old one. Proteolytic enzymes and lymphatic fluid is secreted between the old and new layers of skin. Consequently, this lifts the old skin from the new one allowing shedding to occur. Snakes will shed from the head to the tail while lizards shed in a "patchy pattern". Dysecdysis, a common skin disease in snakes and lizards, will occur when ecdysis, or shedding, fails. There are numerous reasons why shedding fails and can be related to inadequate humidity and temperature, nutritional deficiencies, dehydration and traumatic injuries. Nutritional deficiencies decrease proteolytic enzymes while dehydration reduces lymphatic fluids to separate the skin layers. Traumatic injuries on the other hand, form scars that will not allow new scales to form and disrupt the process of ecdysis.

=== Excretion ===
Excretion is performed mainly by two small kidneys. In diapsids, uric acid is the main nitrogenous waste product; turtles, like mammals, excrete mainly urea. Unlike the kidneys of mammals and birds, reptile kidneys are unable to produce liquid urine more concentrated than their body fluid. This is because they lack a specialized structure called a loop of Henle, which is present in the nephrons of birds and mammals. Because of this, many reptiles use the colon to aid in the reabsorption of water. Some are also able to take up water stored in the bladder. Excess salts are also excreted by nasal and lingual salt glands in some reptiles.

In all reptiles, the urinogenital ducts and the rectum both empty into an organ called a cloaca. In some reptiles, a midventral wall in the cloaca may open into a urinary bladder, but not all. It is present in all turtles and tortoises as well as most lizards, but is lacking in the monitor lizard, the legless lizards. It is absent in the snakes and crocodilians.

Many turtles and lizards have proportionally very large bladders. Charles Darwin noted that the Galapagos tortoise had a bladder which could store up to 20% of its body weight. Such adaptations are the result of environments such as remote islands and deserts where water is very scarce. Other desert-dwelling reptiles have large bladders that can store a long-term reservoir of water for up to several months and aid in osmoregulation.

Turtles have two or more accessory urinary bladders, located lateral to the neck of the urinary bladder and dorsal to the pubis, occupying a significant portion of their body cavity. Their bladder is also usually bilobed with a left and right section. The right section is located under the liver, which prevents large stones from remaining in that side while the left section is more likely to have calculi.

=== Digestion ===
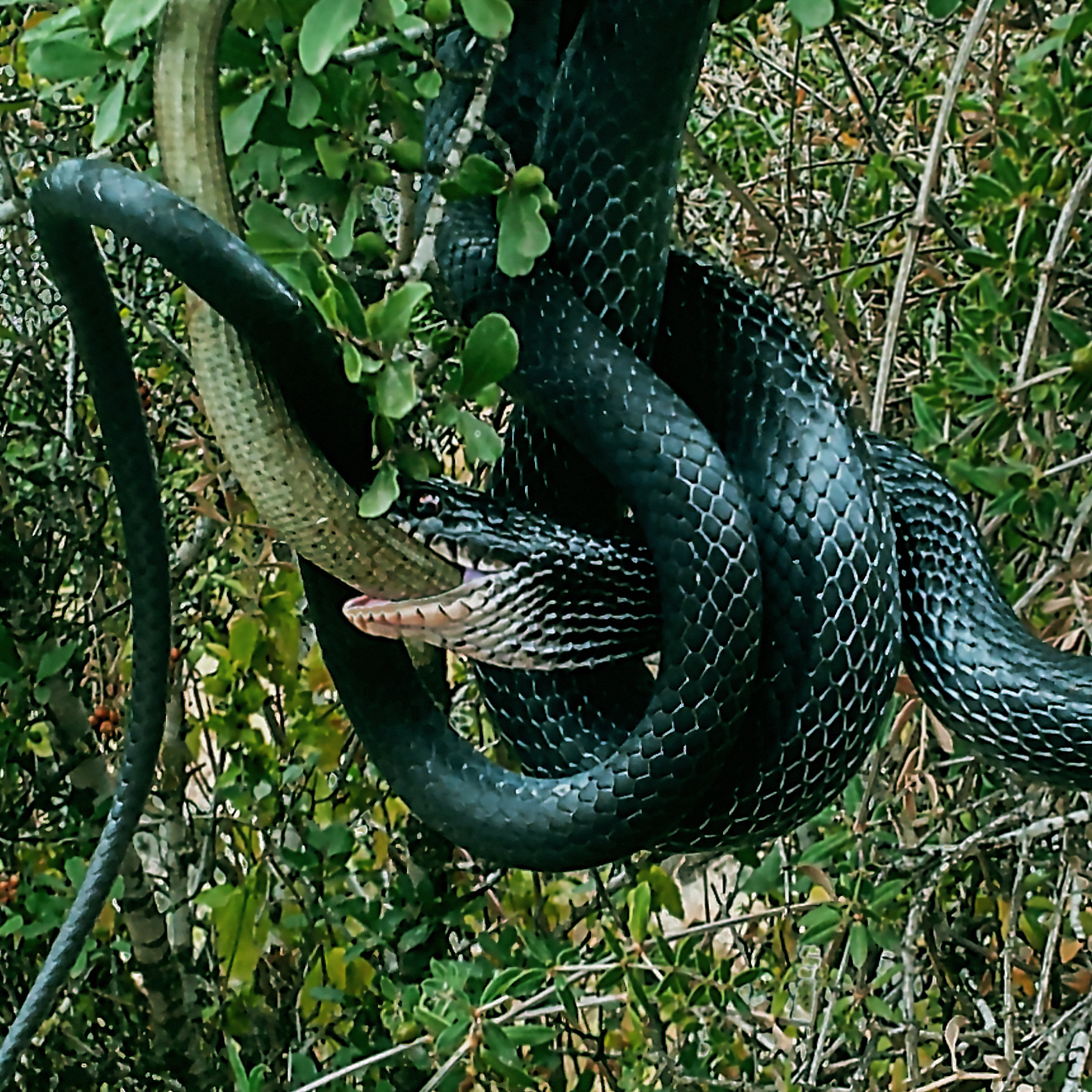
A colubrid snake, Dolichophis jugularis, eating a legless lizard, Pseudopus apodus. Most reptiles are carnivorous, and many primarily eat other reptiles and small mammals.

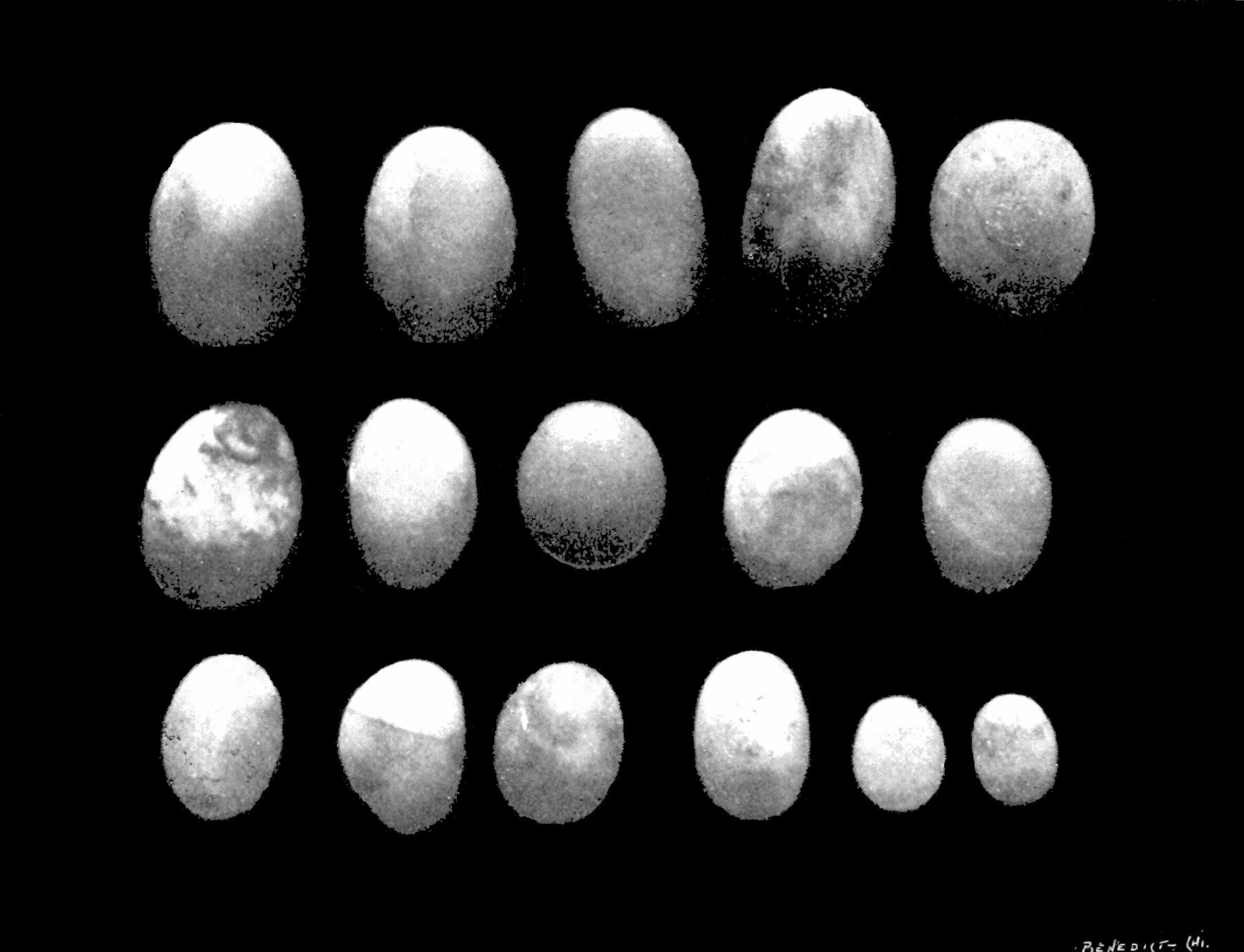
Gastroliths from a plesiosaur

Most reptiles are insectivorous or carnivorous and have simple and comparatively short digestive tracts due to meat being fairly simple to break down and digest. Digestion is slower than in mammals, reflecting their lower resting metabolism and their inability to divide and masticate their food. Their poikilotherm metabolism has very low energy requirements, allowing large reptiles like crocodiles and large constrictors to live from a single large meal for months, digesting it slowly.

While modern reptiles are predominantly carnivorous, during the early history of reptiles several groups produced some herbivorous megafauna: in the Paleozoic, the pareiasaurs; and in the Mesozoic several lines of dinosaurs. Today, turtles are the only predominantly herbivorous reptile group, but several lines of agamas and iguanas have evolved to live wholly or partly on plants.

Herbivorous reptiles face the same problems of mastication as herbivorous mammals but, lacking the complex teeth of mammals, many species swallow rocks and pebbles (so called gastroliths) to aid in digestion: The rocks are washed around in the stomach, helping to grind up plant matter. Fossil gastroliths have been found associated with both ornithopods and sauropods, though whether they actually functioned as a gastric mill in the latter is disputed. Salt water crocodiles also use gastroliths as ballast, stabilizing them in the water or helping them to dive. A dual function as both stabilizing ballast and digestion aid has been suggested for gastroliths found in plesiosaurs.

=== Nerves ===
The reptilian nervous system contains the same basic part of the amphibian brain, but the reptile cerebrum and cerebellum are slightly larger. Most typical sense organs are well developed with certain exceptions, most notably the snake's lack of external ears (middle and inner ears are present). There are twelve pairs of cranial nerves. Due to their short cochlea, reptiles use electrical tuning to expand their range of audible frequencies.

=== Vision ===
Most reptiles are diurnal animals. The vision is typically adapted to daylight conditions, with color vision and more advanced visual depth perception than in amphibians and most mammals.

Reptiles usually have excellent vision, allowing them to detect shapes and motions at long distances. They often have poor vision in low-light conditions. Birds, crocodilians and turtles have three types of photoreceptor: rods, single cones and double cones, which gives them sharp color vision and enables them to see ultraviolet wavelengths. The lepidosaurs appear to have lost the duplex retina and only have a single class of receptor that is cone-like or rod-like depending on whether the species is diurnal or nocturnal. In many burrowing species, such as blind snakes, vision is reduced.

Many lepidosaurs have a photosensory organ on the top of their heads called the parietal eye, which are also called third eye, pineal eye or pineal gland. This "eye" does not work the same way as a normal eye does as it has only a rudimentary retina and lens and thus, cannot form images. It is, however, sensitive to changes in light and dark and can detect movement.

Some snakes have extra sets of visual organs (in the loosest sense of the word) in the form of pits sensitive to infrared radiation (heat). Such heat-sensitive pits are particularly well developed in the pit vipers, but are also found in boas and pythons. These pits allow the snakes to sense the body heat of birds and mammals, enabling pit vipers to hunt rodents in the dark. (Note: "The copperhead is a pit viper and, like others pit vipers, it has heat-sensitive pit organs on each side of its head between the eye and the nostril. These pits detect objects that are warmer than the environment and enable copperheads to locate nocturnal, mammalian prey.")

Most reptiles, as well as birds, possess a nictitating membrane, a translucent third eyelid which is drawn over the eye from the inner corner. In crocodilians, it protects its eyeball surface while allowing a degree of vision underwater. However, many squamates, geckos and snakes in particular, lack eyelids, which are replaced by a transparent scale. This is called the brille, spectacle, or eyecap. The brille is usually not visible, except for when the snake molts, and it protects the eyes from dust and dirt.

=== Reproduction ===
Crocodilian egg diagram (1) eggshell, (2) yolk sac, (3) yolk (nutrients), (4) vessels, (5) amnion, (6) chorion, (7) air space, (8) allantois, (9) albumin (egg white), (10) amniotic sac, (11) crocodile embryo, (12) amniotic fluid

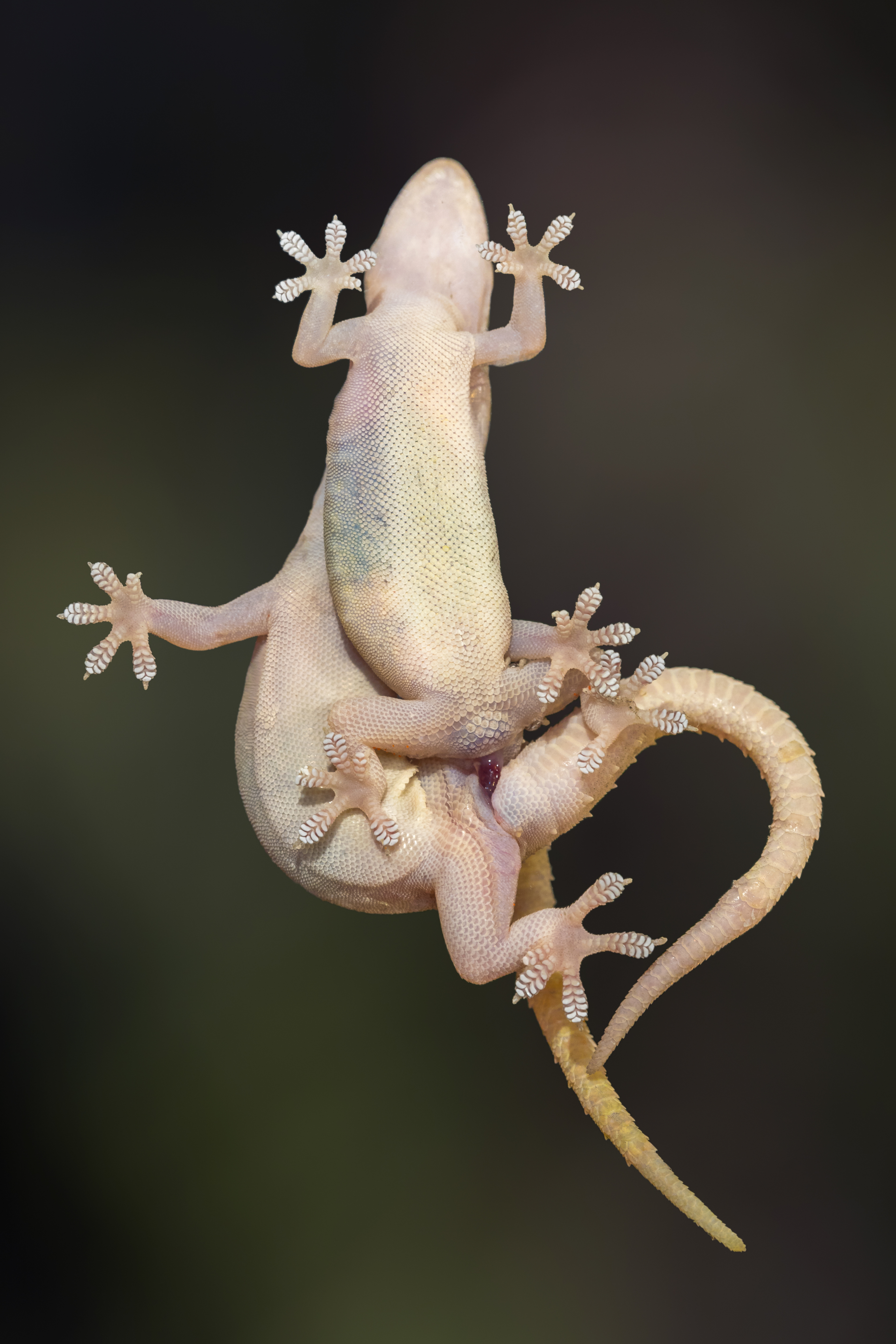
Common house geckos mating, ventral view with hemipenis inserted in the cloaca

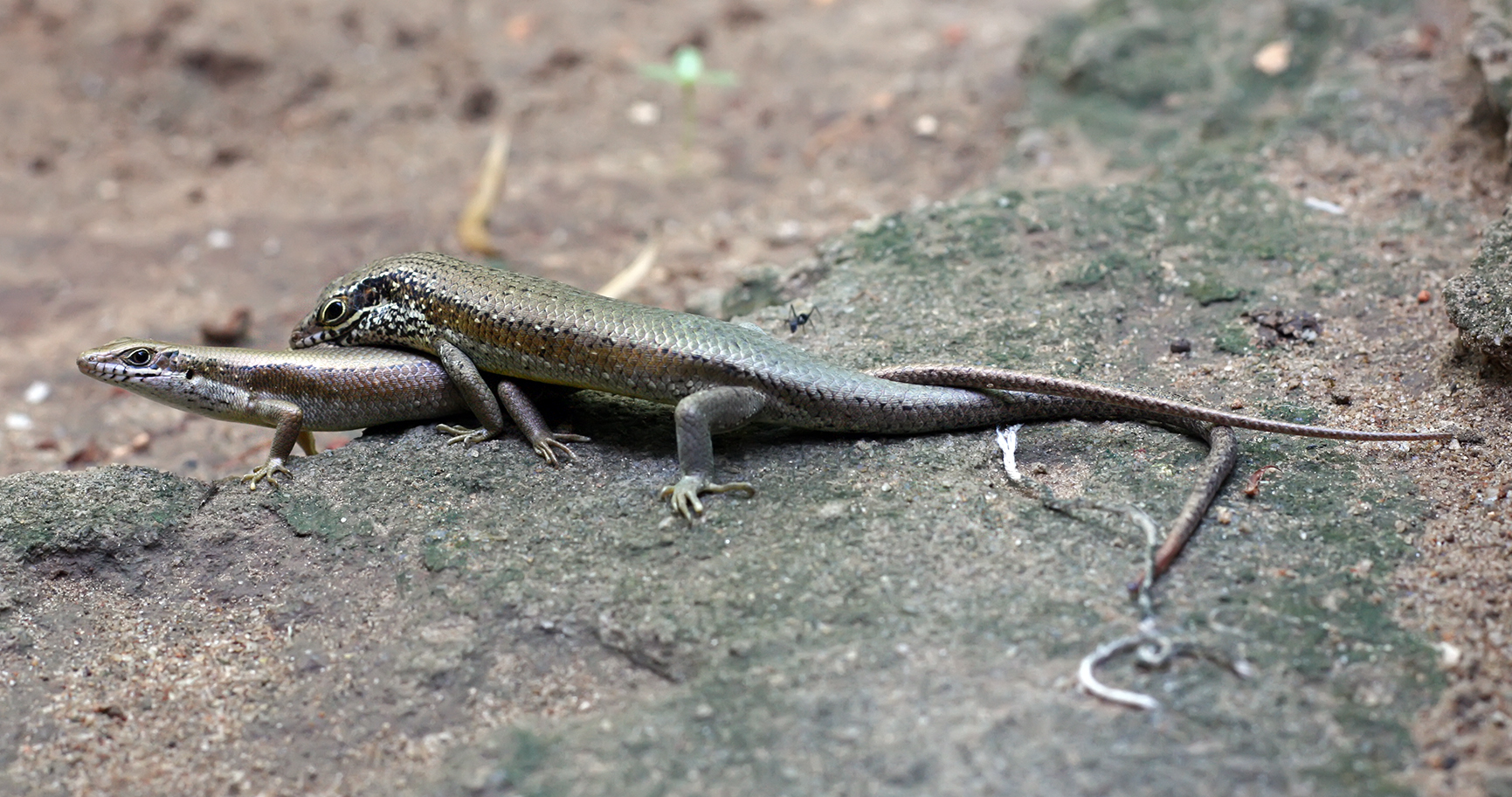
Most reptiles reproduce sexually, for example this Trachylepis maculilabris skink

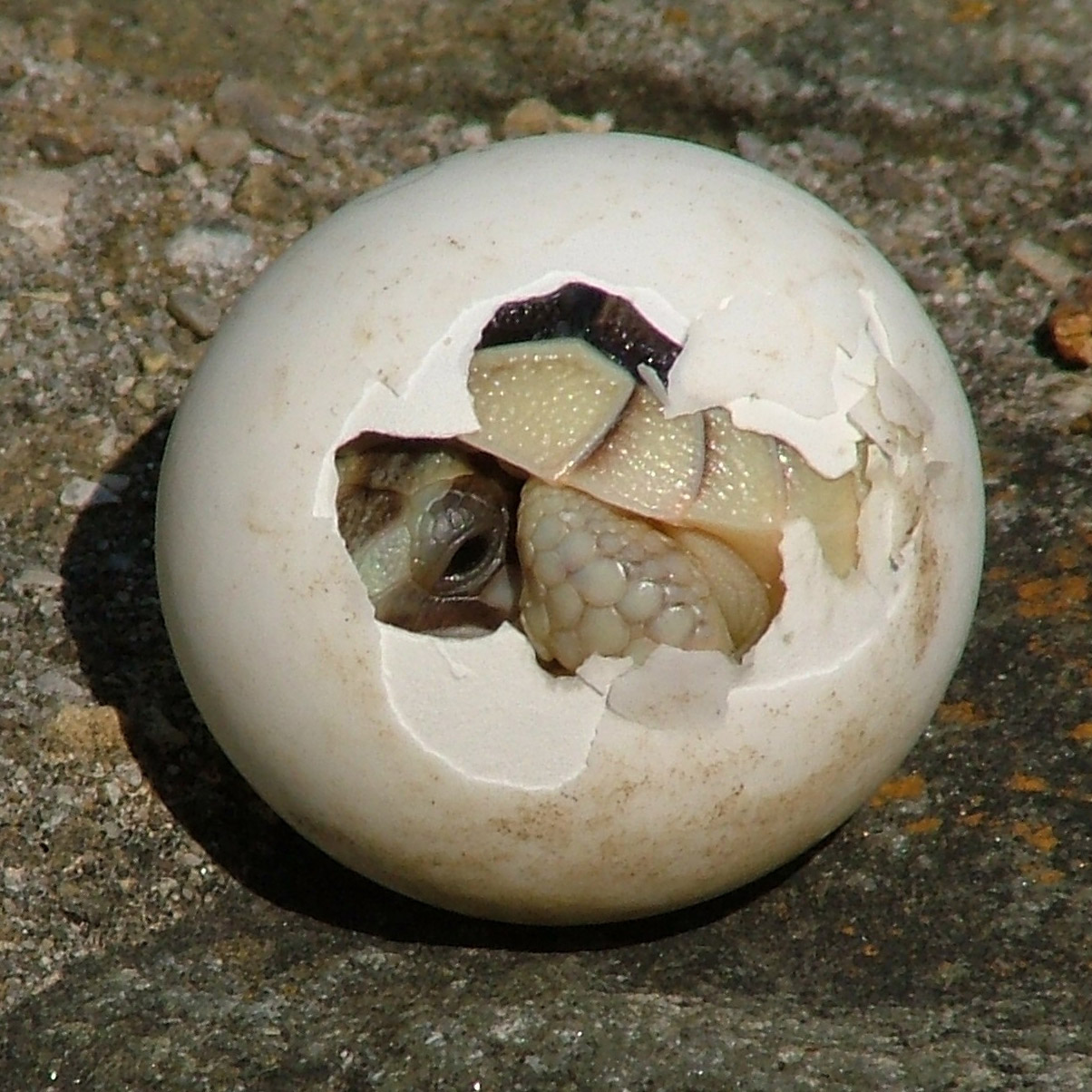
Reptiles have amniotic eggs with hard or leathery shells, requiring internal fertilization when mating.

Reptiles generally reproduce sexually, though some are capable of asexual reproduction. All reproductive activity occurs through the cloaca, the single exit/entrance at the base of the tail where waste is also eliminated. Most reptiles have copulatory organs, which are usually retracted or inverted and stored inside the body. In turtles and crocodilians, the male has a single median penis, while squamates, including snakes and lizards, possess a pair of hemipenes, only one of which is typically used in each session. Tuatara, however, lack copulatory organs, and so the male and female simply press their cloacas together as the male discharges sperm.

Most reptiles lay amniotic eggs covered with leathery or calcareous shells. An amnion (5), chorion (6), and allantois (8) are present during embryonic life. The eggshell (1) protects the crocodile embryo (11) and keeps it from drying out, but it is flexible to allow gas exchange. The chorion (6) aids in gas exchange between the inside and outside of the egg. It allows carbon dioxide to exit the egg and oxygen gas to enter the egg. The albumin (9) further protects the embryo and serves as a reservoir for water and protein. The allantois (8) is a sac that collects the metabolic waste produced by the embryo. The amniotic sac (10) contains amniotic fluid (12) which protects and cushions the embryo. The amnion (5) aids in osmoregulation and serves as a saltwater reservoir. The yolk sac (2) surrounding the yolk (3) contains protein and fat rich nutrients that are absorbed by the embryo via vessels (4) that allow the embryo to grow and metabolize. The air space (7) provides the embryo with oxygen while it is hatching. This ensures that the embryo will not suffocate while it is hatching. There are no larval stages of development. Viviparity and ovoviviparity have evolved in squamates and many extinct clades of reptiles. Among squamates, many species, including all boas and most vipers, use this mode of reproduction. The degree of viviparity varies; some species simply retain the eggs until just before hatching, others provide maternal nourishment to supplement the yolk, and yet others lack any yolk and provide all nutrients via a structure similar to the mammalian placenta. The earliest documented case of viviparity in reptiles is the Early Permian mesosaurs, although some individuals or taxa in that clade may also have been oviparous because a putative isolated egg has also been found. Several groups of Mesozoic marine reptiles also exhibited viviparity, such as mosasaurs, ichthyosaurs, and Sauropterygia, a group that includes pachypleurosaurs and Plesiosauria.

Asexual reproduction has been identified in squamates in six families of lizards and one snake. In some species of squamates, a population of females is able to produce a unisexual diploid clone of the mother. This form of asexual reproduction, called parthenogenesis, occurs in several species of gecko, and is particularly widespread in the teiids (especially Aspidocelis) and lacertids (Lacerta). In captivity, Komodo dragons (Varanidae) have reproduced by parthenogenesis.

Parthenogenetic species are suspected to occur among chameleons, agamids, xantusiids, and typhlopids.

Some reptiles exhibit temperature-dependent sex determination (TDSD), in which the incubation temperature determines whether a particular egg hatches as male or female. TDSD is most common in turtles and crocodiles, but also occurs in lizards and tuatara. To date, there has been no confirmation of whether TDSD occurs in snakes.

=== Longevity ===
Giant tortoises are among the longest-lived vertebrate animals (over 100 years by some estimates) and have been used as a model for studying longevity. DNA analysis of the genomes of Lonesome George, the iconic last member of Chelonoidis abingdonii, and the Aldabra giant tortoise Aldabrachelys gigantea led to the detection of lineage-specific variants affecting DNA repair genes that might contribute to our understanding of increased lifespan.

== Cognition ==
Reptiles were traditionally considered less intelligent on average than mammals and birds, but this is increasingly suspected to be the result of poor methodologies in past research and overreliance on brain size as indicators of intelligence rather than a genuine trait of reptiles. The size of their brain relative to their body is much less than that of mammals, the encephalization quotient being about one tenth of that of mammals, though larger reptiles can show more complex brain development. Larger lizards, like the monitors, are known to exhibit complex behavior, including cooperation and cognitive abilities allowing them to optimize their foraging and territoriality over time. Crocodiles have relatively larger brains and show a fairly complex social structure. The Komodo dragon is even known to engage in play, as are turtles, which are also considered to be social creatures, and sometimes switch between monogamy and promiscuity in their sexual behavior. One study found that wood turtles were better than white rats at learning to navigate mazes. Another study found that giant tortoises are capable of learning through operant conditioning, visual discrimination and retained learned behaviors with long-term memory. Sea turtles have been regarded as having simple brains, but their flippers are used for a variety of foraging tasks (holding, bracing, corralling) in common with marine mammals.

There is evidence that reptiles are sentient and able to feel emotions including anxiety and pleasure.

== Defense mechanisms ==
Many small reptiles, such as snakes and lizards, that live on the ground or in the water are vulnerable to being preyed on by all kinds of carnivorous animals. Thus, avoidance is the most common form of defense in reptiles. At the first sign of danger, most snakes and lizards crawl away into the undergrowth, and turtles and crocodiles will plunge into water and sink out of sight.

=== Camouflage and warning ===
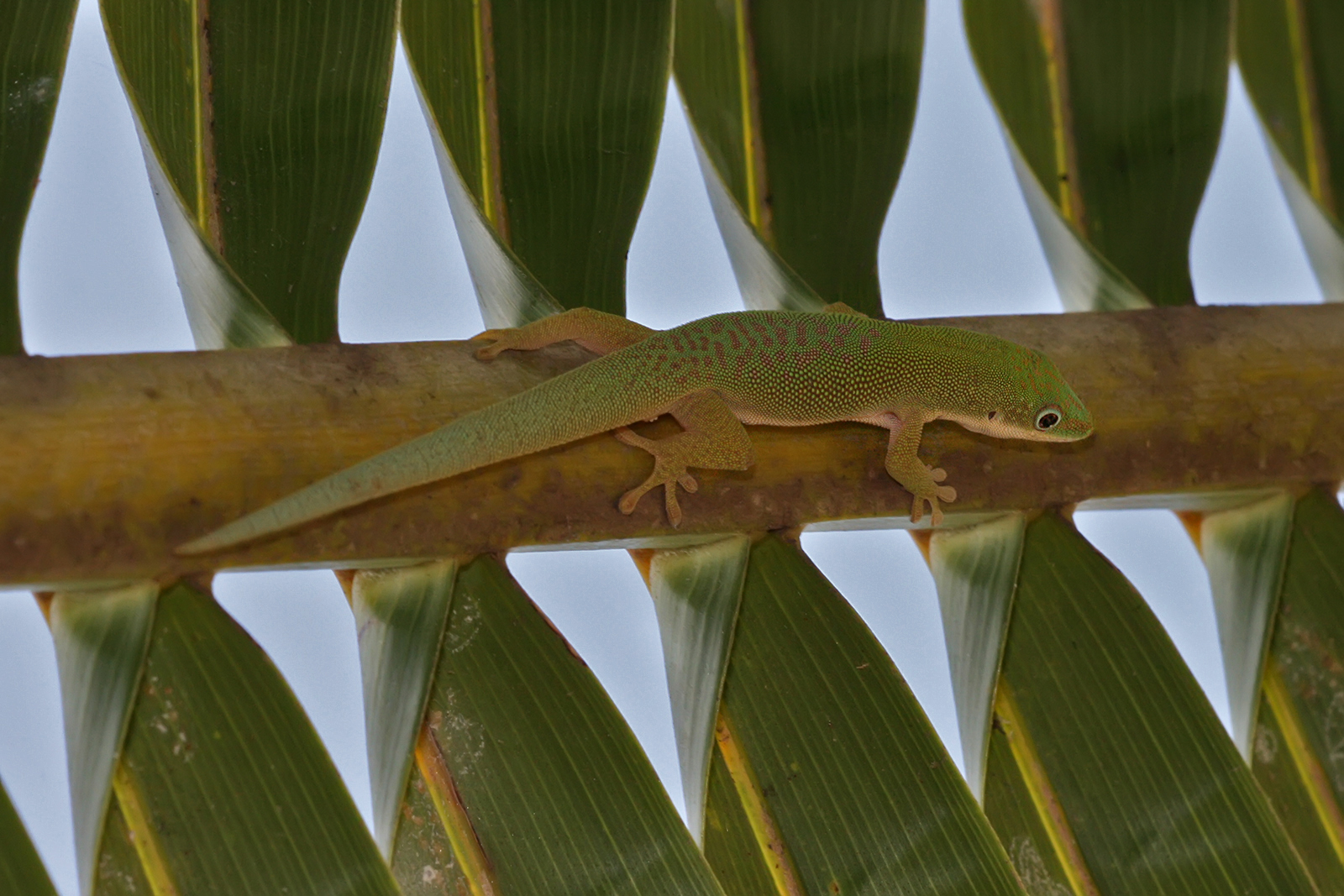
A camouflaged Phelsuma deubia on a palm frond

Reptiles tend to avoid confrontation through camouflage. Two major groups of reptile predators are birds and other reptiles, both of which have well-developed color vision. Thus the skins of many reptiles have cryptic coloration of plain or mottled gray, green, and brown to allow them to blend into the background of their natural environment. Aided by the reptiles' capacity for remaining motionless for long periods, the camouflage of many snakes is so effective that people or domestic animals are most typically bitten because they accidentally step on them.

When camouflage fails to protect them, blue-tongued skinks will try to ward off attackers by displaying their blue tongues, and the frill-necked lizard will display its brightly colored frill. These same displays are used in territorial disputes and during courtship. If danger arises so suddenly that flight is useless, crocodiles, turtles, some lizards, and some snakes hiss loudly when confronted by an enemy. Rattlesnakes rapidly vibrate the tip of the tail, which is composed of a series of nested, hollow beads to ward off approaching danger.

In contrast to the normal drab coloration of most reptiles, the lizards of the genus Heloderma (the Gila monster and the beaded lizard) and many of the coral snakes have high-contrast warning coloration, warning potential predators they are venomous. A number of non-venomous North American snake species have colorful markings similar to those of the coral snake, an oft cited example of Batesian mimicry.

=== Alternative defense in snakes ===
Camouflage does not always fool a predator. Snake species adopt different defensive tactics and use a complicated set of behaviors when attacked. Some species, like cobras or hognose snakes, first elevate their head and spread out the skin of their neck in an effort to look large and threatening. Failure of this strategy may lead to other measures practiced particularly by cobras, vipers, and closely related species, which use venom to attack. The venom is modified saliva, delivered through fangs from a venom gland. Some non-venomous snakes, such as American hognose snakes or European grass snake, play dead when in danger; some, including the grass snake, exude a foul-smelling liquid to deter attackers.

=== Defense in crocodilians ===
When a crocodilian is concerned about its safety, it will gape to expose the teeth and tongue. If this does not work, the crocodilian gets a little more agitated and typically begins to make hissing sounds. After this, the crocodilian will start to change its posture dramatically to make itself look more intimidating. The body is inflated to increase apparent size. If absolutely necessary, it may decide to attack an enemy.

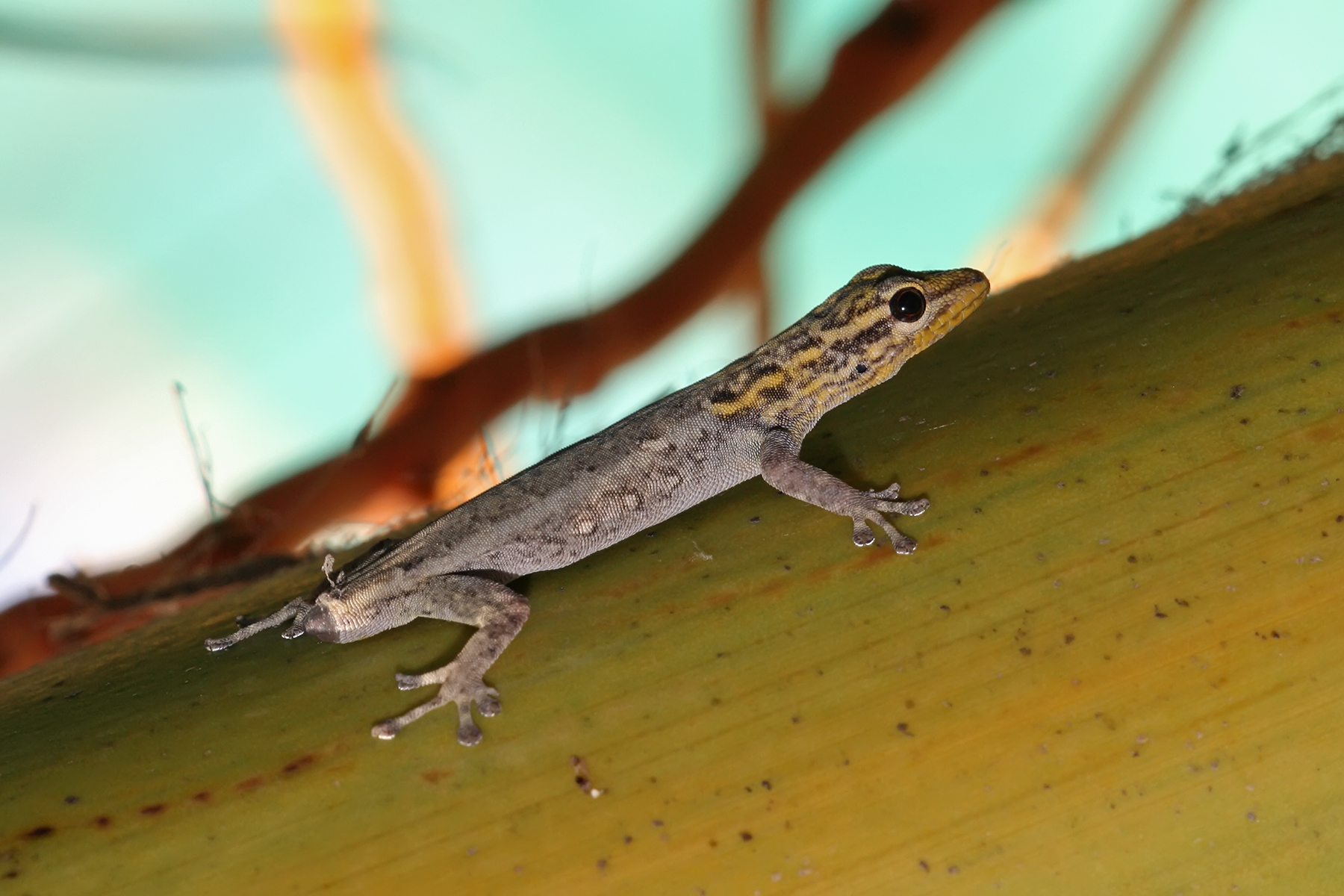
A White-headed dwarf gecko with shed tail

Some species try to bite immediately. Some will use their heads as sledgehammers and literally smash an opponent, some will rush or swim toward the threat from a distance, even chasing the opponent onto land or galloping after it. The main weapon in all crocodilians is the bite, which can generate very high bite force. Many species also possess canine-like teeth. These are used primarily for seizing prey, but are also used in fighting and display.

=== Shedding and regenerating tails ===
Geckos, skinks, and some other lizards that are captured by the tail will shed part of the tail structure through a process called autotomy and thus be able to flee. The detached tail will continue to thrash, creating a deceptive sense of continued struggle and distracting the predator's attention from the fleeing prey animal. The detached tails of leopard geckos can wiggle for up to 20 minutes. The tail grows back in most species, but some, like crested geckos, lose their tails for the rest of their lives. In many species the tails are of a separate and dramatically more intense color than the rest of the body so as to encourage potential predators to strike for the tail first. In the shingleback skink and some species of geckos, the tail is short and broad and resembles the head, so that the predators may attack it rather than the more vulnerable front part.

Reptiles that are capable of shedding their tails can partially regenerate them over a period of weeks. The new section will however contain cartilage rather than bone, and will never grow to the same length as the original tail. It is often also distinctly discolored compared to the rest of the body and may lack some of the external sculpting features seen in the original tail.

== Relations with humans ==
=== In cultures and religions ===
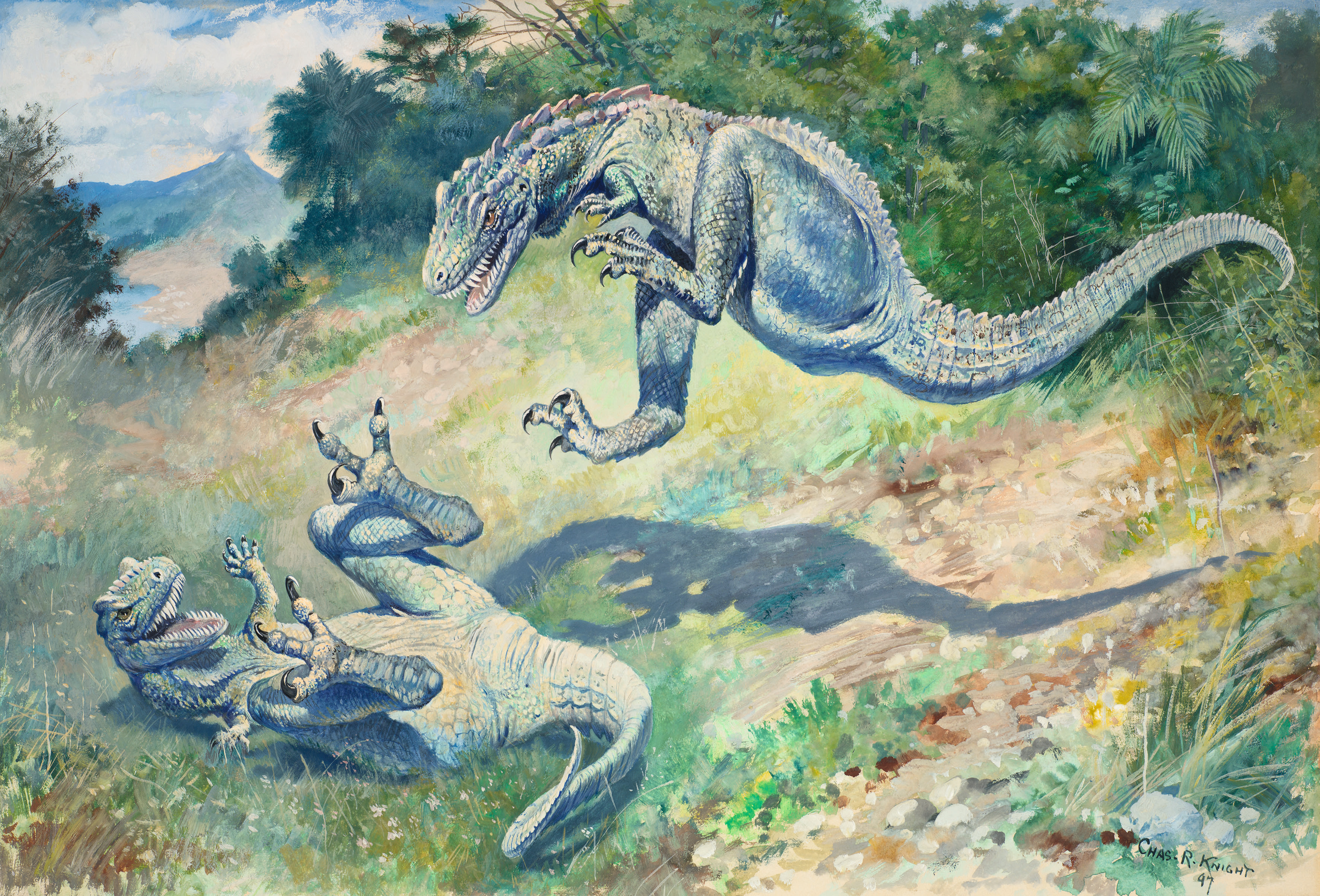
Painting of fighting "Laelaps" (now Dryptosaurus) by Charles R. Knight (1897)

Dinosaurs have been widely depicted in culture since the English palaeontologist Richard Owen coined the name dinosaur in 1842. As soon as 1854, the Crystal Palace Dinosaurs were on display to the public in south London. One dinosaur appeared in literature even earlier, as Charles Dickens placed a Megalosaurus in the first chapter of his novel Bleak House in 1852. (Note: "Michaelmas term lately over, and the Lord Chancellor sitting in Lincoln's Inn Hall. Implacable November weather. As much mud in the streets, as if the waters had but newly retired from the face of the earth, and it would not be wonderful to meet a Megalosaurus, forty feet long or so, waddling like an elephantine lizard up Holborne Hill.") The dinosaurs featured in books, films, television programs, artwork, and other media have been used for both education and entertainment. The depictions range from the realistic, as in the television documentaries of the 1990s and first decade of the 21st century, to the fantastic, as in the monster movies of the 1950s and 1960s.

The snake or serpent has played a powerful symbolic role in different cultures. In Egyptian history, the Nile cobra adorned the crown of the pharaoh. It was worshipped as one of the gods and was also used for sinister purposes: murder of an adversary and ritual suicide (Cleopatra). In Greek mythology, snakes are associated with deadly antagonists, as a chthonic symbol, roughly translated as earthbound. The nine-headed Lernaean Hydra that Hercules defeated and the three Gorgon sisters are children of Gaia, the earth. Medusa was one of the three Gorgon sisters who Perseus defeated. Medusa is described as a hideous mortal, with snakes instead of hair and the power to turn men to stone with her gaze. After killing her, Perseus gave her head to Athena who fixed it to her shield called the Aegis. The Titans are depicted in art with their legs replaced by bodies of snakes for the same reason: They are children of Gaia, so they are bound to the earth. In Hinduism, snakes are worshipped as gods, with many women pouring milk on snake pits. The cobra is seen on the neck of Shiva, while Vishnu is depicted often as sleeping on a seven-headed snake or within the coils of a serpent. There are temples in India solely for cobras sometimes called Nagraj (King of Snakes), and it is believed that snakes are symbols of fertility. In the annual Hindu festival of Nag Panchami, snakes are venerated and prayed to. In religious terms, the snake and jaguar are arguably the most important animals in ancient Mesoamerica. "In states of ecstasy, lords dance a serpent dance; great descending snakes adorn and support buildings from Chichen Itza to Tenochtitlan, and the Nahuatl word coatl meaning serpent or twin, forms part of primary deities such as Mixcoatl, Quetzalcoatl, and Coatlicue." In Christianity and Judaism, a serpent tempts Adam and Eve with the forbidden fruit from the Tree of Knowledge of Good and Evil.

The turtle has a prominent position as a symbol of steadfastness and tranquility in religion, mythology, and folklore from around the world. A tortoise's longevity is suggested by its long lifespan and its shell, which was thought to protect it from any foe. In the cosmological myths of several cultures a World Turtle carries the world upon its back or supports the heavens.

=== Medicine ===
The Rod of Asclepius symbolizes medicine

Deaths from snakebites are uncommon in many parts of the world, but are still counted in tens of thousands per year in India. Snakebite can be treated with antivenom made from the venom of the snake. To produce antivenom, a mixture of the venoms of different species of snake is injected into the body of a horse in ever-increasing dosages until the horse is immunized. Blood is then extracted; the serum is separated, purified and freeze-dried. The cytotoxic effect of snake venom is being researched as a potential treatment for cancers.

Gila monsters produce compounds that reduce plasma glucose; one of these substances is now used in the anti-diabetes drug exenatide (Byetta), a glucagon-like peptide-1 (GLP-1) receptor agonist like semiglutide (Ozempic). Another toxin from Gila monster saliva has been studied for use as an anti-Alzheimer's drug.

Geckos have also been used as folk medicine, especially in China, without any evidence that they have any active compounds. Turtles have been used in Chinese traditional medicine for thousands of years, with every part of the turtle believed to have medical benefits (again, without scientific evidence). Growing demand for turtle meat has placed pressure on vulnerable wild populations of turtles.

=== Commercial farming ===
Crocodiles are protected in many parts of the world, and are farmed commercially. Their hides are tanned and used to make leather goods such as shoes and handbags; crocodile meat is also considered a delicacy. The most commonly farmed species are the saltwater and Nile crocodiles. Farming has resulted in an increase in the saltwater crocodile population in Australia, as eggs are usually harvested from the wild, so landowners have an incentive to conserve their habitat. Crocodile leather is made into wallets, briefcases, purses, handbags, belts, hats, and shoes. Crocodile oil has been used for various purposes.

Snakes are also farmed, primarily in East and Southeast Asia, and their production has become more intensive in the last decade. Snake farming has been troubling for conservation in the past as it can lead to overexploitation of wild snakes and their natural prey to supply the farms. However, farming snakes can limit the hunting of wild snakes, while reducing the slaughter of higher-order vertebrates like cows. The energy efficiency of snakes is higher than expected for carnivores, due to their ectothermy and low metabolism. Waste protein from the poultry and pig industries is used as feed in snake farms. Snake farms produce meat, snake skin, and antivenom.

Turtle farming is another known but controversial practice. Turtles have been farmed for a variety of reasons, ranging from food to traditional medicine, the pet trade, and scientific conservation. Demand for turtle meat and medicinal products is one of the main threats to turtle conservation in Asia. Though commercial breeding would seem to insulate wild populations, it can stoke the demand for them and increase wild captures. Even the potentially appealing concept of raising turtles at a farm to release into the wild is questioned by some veterinarians who have had some experience with farm operations. They caution that this may introduce into the wild populations infectious diseases that occur on the farm, but have not (yet) been occurring in the wild.

=== Reptiles in captivity ===
A herpetarium is a zoological exhibition space for reptiles and amphibians.

In the Western world, some snakes (especially relatively docile species such as the ball python and corn snake) are sometimes kept as pets. Numerous species of lizard are kept as pets, including bearded dragons, iguanas, anoles, and geckos (such as the popular leopard gecko and the crested gecko).

Turtles and tortoises are increasingly popular pets, but keeping them can be challenging due to their particular requirements, such as temperature control, the need for UV light sources, and a varied diet. The long lifespans of turtles and especially tortoises mean they can potentially outlive their owners. Good hygiene and significant maintenance is necessary when keeping reptiles, due to the risks of Salmonella and other pathogens. Regular hand-washing after handling is an important measure to prevent infection.

== See also ==
- Amphibian and reptile tunnel
- List of reptiles
- Lists of reptiles by region
- Reptile Database
