= Tachyaerobic =

Tachyaerobic is a term used in biology to describe the muscles of large animals and birds that are able to maintain high levels or physical activity because their hearts make up at least 0.5-0.6 percent of their body mass and maintain high blood pressures. A reptile displaying equal size to a tachyaerobic mammal does not have the same capabilities. Tachyaerobic animals' hearts beat more quickly, produce more oxygen, and distribute blood at a quicker rate than reptiles.

The use of tachyaerobic muscles is important to animals such as giraffes that need blood circulated through a large body size quickly.

== See also ==
- Bradyaerobic
