= Bradyaerobic =

Term used to describe animals with low levels of oxygen consumption

Bradyaerobic is a term used in biology that describes an animal that has low levels of oxygen consumption.

By necessity a bradyaerobic animal can engage in short low or high low-level aerobic exercise, followed by brief anaerobically powered bursts of energy. Bradyaerobes can be sprinters, but not long-distance animals.
