= List of natural hygienists =

Natural hygienists (also called orthopaths) are people who practice orthopathy. The following people are recognized as notable natural hygienists, either currently or historically.

== A ==
- Harriet N. Austin

== B ==
- Sanford Bennett
- Paul Bragg

== C ==
- Paul Carton

== D ==
- Emmet Densmore
- Arnold DeVries
- H. Jay Dinshah
- Susanna Way Dodds

== E ==
- Arnold Ehret

== G ==
- Jesse Mercer Gehman
- Symon Gould
- Sylvester Graham

== H ==
- Annie Riley Hale
- Linda Hazzard

== J ==
- James Caleb Jackson
- Isaac Jennings
- James Hervey Johnson

== K ==
- Ben Klassen
- Henry Valentine Knaggs

== M ==
- Frank McCoy
- Eli Peck Miller

== N ==
- Mary Gove Nichols

== O ==
- Felix Leopold Oswald

== P ==
- Charles Edward Page
- Edward Earle Purinton

== S ==
- Herbert M. Shelton
- Joel Shew
- Walter Siegmeister
- Edmund Bordeaux Szekely

== T ==
- George H. Taylor
- John Henry Tilden
- Russell Thacher Trall

== W ==
- Robert Walter
- George S. Weger
