= Martin Luther Holbrook =

American physician (1831–1902)

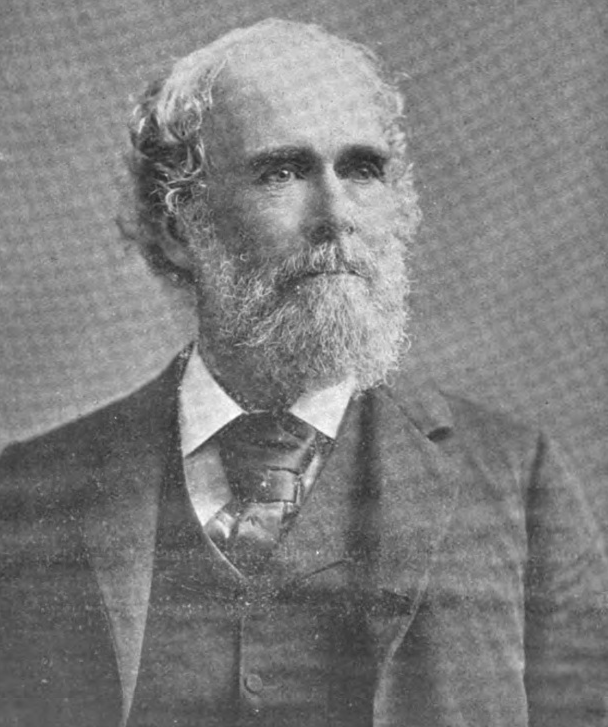
- Born: February 3, 1831; Mantua Township, Portage County, Ohio
- Died: August 12, 1902 (aged 71); New York City
- Occupations: Physician, writer

Martin Luther Holbrook (February 3, 1831 - August 12, 1902) was an American physician and vegetarianism activist associated with the natural hygiene and physical culture movements.

== Biography ==
Holbrook was born in Mantua Township, Portage County, Ohio. Holbrook graduated from Ohio Agricultural College and edited the Ohio Farmer (1859-1861). During 1861–1863, Holbrook worked with Dio Lewis in Boston to promote physical culture and hygiene. He graduated from Lewis's Normal School of Physical Culture. He moved to New York City and obtained his medical degree from the Hygeio-Therapeutic College in 1864.

Holbrook was coproprietor of the New Hygienic Institute at Laight Street in New York City, the property was previously Russell Trall's water-cure institution. He was a founder of Miller, Wood and Holbrook firm and Miller, Wood & Co publishers of medical books. He later published under his own name, M. L. Holbrook and was an important publisher of medical and hygienic literature up until the 1890s. The printing press was located at Laight Street in New York City. It shared the same address as Russell Trall's New York Hygeio-Therapeutic College. Also at the same address, in 1865 the three directors opened the first Victorian Turkish baths in Manhattan, barely two years after the first such bath was opened in the US.

Holbrook was a vegetarian and promoted abstinence from alcohol, coffee, meat, tea, and tobacco. He translated the German raw food book Fruit and Bread by Gustav Schlickeysen. The book promoted a fruitarian diet of uncooked fruits, grains and nuts.

Holbrook was an advocate of chastity. His 1894 book on the subject recommended a physical culture regimen to increase the body's strength and diminish "morbid craving for unnatural and unreasonable indulgence of the passional nature." He was a prominent eugenicist and authored the 1897 book Stirpiculture, later re-printed as Homo-Culture.

Holbrook's Eating for Strength, published in 1888 contains several hundred vegetarian recipes.

== The Herald of Health ==
From 1866, Holbrook was a long-term editor for Russell Trall's The Herald of Health (it became the Journal of Hygiene in 1893). He edited the journal until 1898. It was a very popular journal.

In 1898, the journal was renamed Omega and was edited by Holbrook and Charles Alfred Tyrrell. It merged with Physical Culture.

== Selected publications ==
Holbrook's publications can be found in the New York Public Library.

- Parturition without Pain: A Code of Directions for Escaping the Primal Curse (1874)
- Hygiene of the Brain and Nerves and the Cure of Nervousness (1878)
- How to Strengthen the Memory (1886)
- Dr. Holbrook's American Cookery (1888)
- Eating for Strength (1888)
- Physical, Intellectual, and Moral Advantages of Chastity (1894)
- Stirpiculture: Or, the Improvement of Offspring Through Wiser Generation (1897)
- Homo-Culture: Or, the Improvement of Offspring Through Wiser Generation (1899)
