= Robert Walter (physician) =

American physician

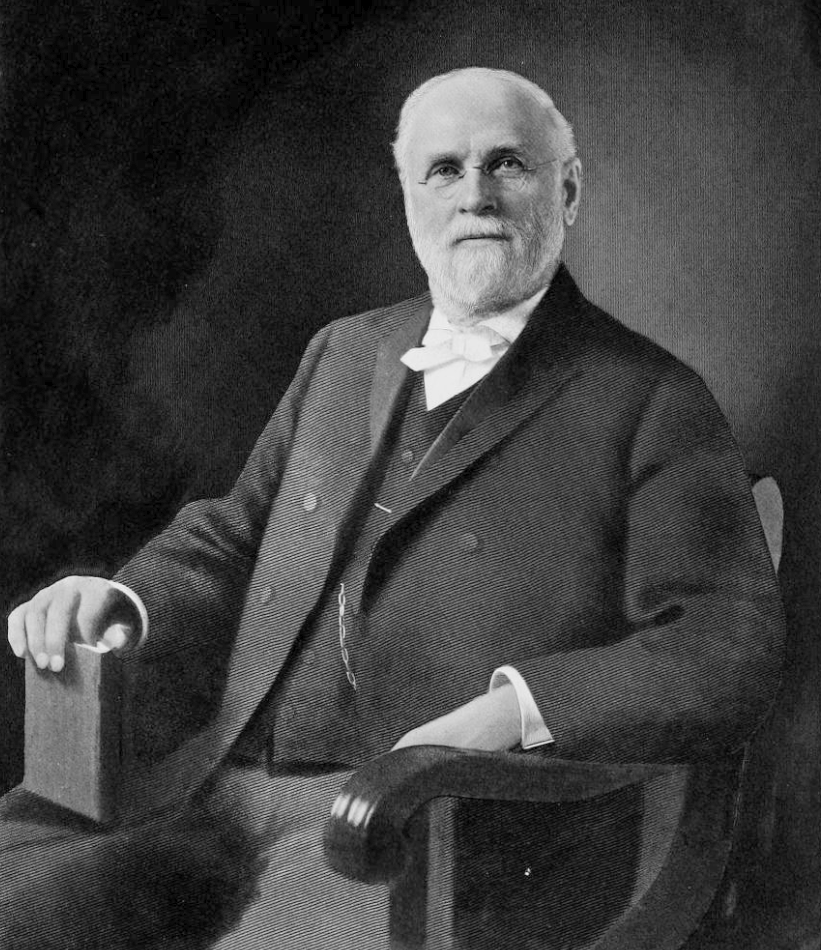
- Born: February 14, 1841; Acton, Canada West
- Died: October 26, 1921 (aged 80); Reading, Pennsylvania
- Occupations: Physician, writer

Signature
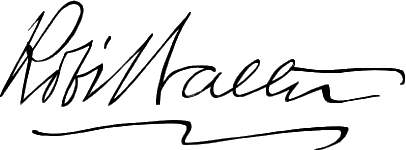

Robert Walter (February 14, 1841 – October 26, 1921) was a Canadian American physician and natural hygiene proponent.

== Biography ==
Walter was born in Acton, Canada West. As a young man he moved to Danville, New York, where he studied medicine. He graduated from the Hygeio-Therapeutic College of New York in 1873 and the Hahnemann Medical College of Philadelphia in 1888. He worked as a homeopath and hydrotherapist for twenty-five years. He married Eunice C. Lippincott in 1872. They had three daughters and two sons. In 1876, he established the Walter Sanitarium in Walter's Park, Pennsylvania. His book Vital Science makes frequent reference to Biblical literature. Walter was a member of the Society of Friends.

Walter authored the natural hygiene book The Exact Science of Health, in 1903. It was negatively reviewed in medical journals. The book espoused fasting, homeopathic medicine and vitalism. Walter opposed conventional medicine and believed that disease could be cured by people avoiding food and flushing the bowel several times a day. He was an early advocate of colon cleansing. A review in the International Medical Magazine commented that "there are some valuable hygienic suggestions in the book, but they are buried among a mass of platitudes and other unscientific extraneous matter." A review in the American Journal of the Medical Sciences noted that it "bristles with scientific inaccuracies and still more mischievous perversions and misinterpretations of facts." Walter was criticized for not keeping up to date with the progress of modern medical science.

Walter died on October 26, 1921, in Reading, Pennsylvania.

== Selected publications ==
- Vital Science Based Upon Life's Great Law: The Analogue of Gravitation (1899)
- The Exact Science of Health (1903)
- The Power That Cures (The New England Medical Gazette, 1914)

== See also ==
- Susanna Way Dodds
