= George H. Taylor (physician) =

American physician (1821–1896)

George Herbert Taylor
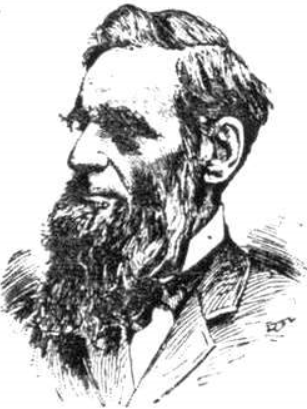
- Born: January 4, 1821; Williston, Vermont
- Died: December 9, 1896 (aged 75); New York City
- Education: New York Medical College
- Occupations: Physician, writer

George Herbert Taylor (January 4, 1821 – December 9, 1896) was an American physician and inventor associated with the natural hygiene and physical culture movements. He was known for his practice of homeopathy and introducing Swedish massage to the United States.

== Biography ==
Taylor was born in Williston, Vermont. In 1852, he graduated at the New York Medical College and practiced hydropathy. He worked at Russell Trall's New York Hydropathic and Physiological School as a consulting physician until 1863. From 1854 to 1855, Taylor worked with hydrotherapist Joel Shew. Taylor became a convert to homeopathy and travelled to study Swedish massage at the Royal Gymnastic Central Institute under Lars Branting. Taylor's brother was physician Charles Fayette Taylor. They opened a hydropathic facility.

During 1858–1859, Taylor travelled to Herman Sätherberg's Institute of Kinesipathy in Stockholm to continue his studies. When he returned home he founded the Institute of the Swedish Movement Cure in New York City and his brother joined his practice. In 1862, Olivia Langdon was treated at the institute. He also established the Improved Movement Cure Institute in New York City.

In 1860, Taylor authored the book An Exposition of the Swedish Movement-Cure. His book Diseases of Women was the first book to recommend massage for gynaecological problems. Taylor designed exercise and mechanical massage equipment. He invented mechanical massage apparatus to expand the chest and lift the contents of the pelvis.

Taylor was an advocate of natural hygiene. He believed that correct breathing and diet, gymnastics and mechanical massage could replace medical intervention and restore health.

Taylor died in New York City on December 9, 1896.

== Selected publications ==
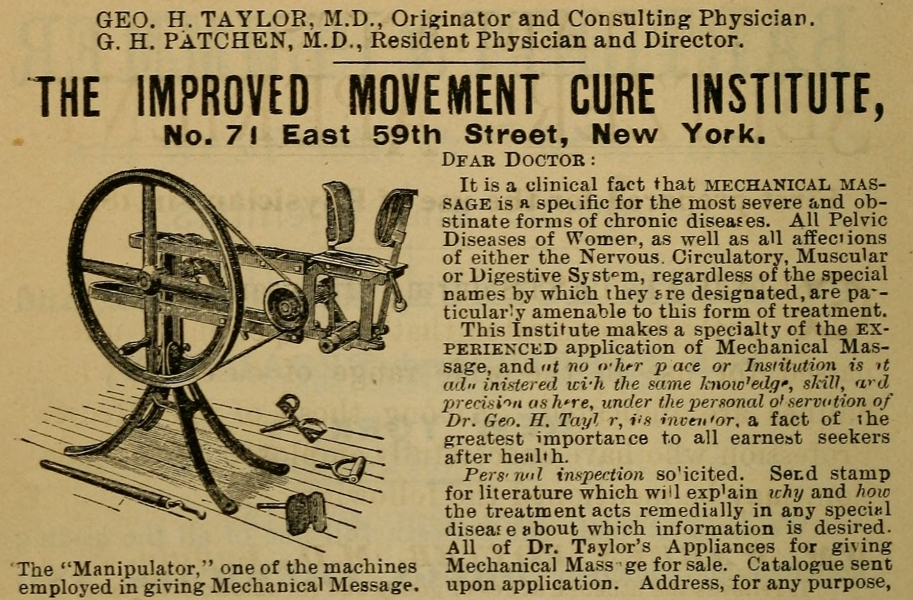
Improved Movement Cure Institute advert, 1887

- An Exposition of the Swedish Movement-Cure (1860)
- Diseases of Women (1871)
- Paralysis and Diseases of the Nerves, and the Remedial Use of Transmitted Motor Energy (1871)
- Health by Exercise (1880)
- Health for Women (1880)
- Massage (1887)
- Pelvic and Hernial Therapeutics (1885)
- Massage Mechanical Processes (1887)
- Mechanical Aids in the Treatment of Chronic Forms of Disease (1893)

== See also ==
- Pehr Henrik Ling
- Russell Thacher Trall
