= Eli Peck Miller =

American physician and vegetarian (1828–1912)

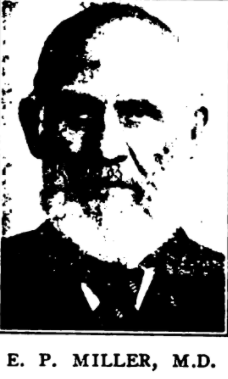
- Born: 1828
- Died: 19 December 1912 (aged 83–84)
- Occupations: Physician, writer

Eli Peck Miller (1828 – 19 December 1912), best known as E. P. Miller was an American physician, hydrotherapist, vegetarian and natural hygiene advocate.

== Biography ==
Miller was an 1862 graduate of the New York Hygeio-Therapeutic College and an 1864 graduate of Bellevue Hospital Medical College. Miller combined hydrotherapy with diet as complementary therapeutics. He opposed the use of alcohol and tobacco. Miller was a Christian who held the view that suffering was the result of sin, and disease could be caused by eating the wrong foods. He recommended that his clients abstain from coffee, strong milk, pickles, spices and tea.

Early in his career Miller worked with hydrotherapist Russell Trall. Miller was a physician and later became a proprietor, with Dr A L Wood, of the New York Hygienic Institute in Laight Street, New York City NY. In March 1865, they added Victorian Turkish baths to their establishment. An 1870 advertising booklet shows that by then Miller and his wife had left the Institute. The following year they opened the Bath Hotel on West 26th Street. This incorporated "Dr Miller's Turkish, Roman and Electric Baths", which remained open until at least 1886.

From 1865, Miller was the editor of The Herald of Health and Journal of Physical Culture. This journal was the successor of The Herald of Health edited by Russell Trall. In 1893, the journal changed title to the Journal of Hygiene and Herald of Health.

Miller died of pneumonia on 19 December 1912, aged 84.

== Beliefs ==
=== Phrenology ===
Miller was a phrenologist and contributed articles to The Phrenological Journal and Science of Health. His hygienic institute conducted phrenological examinations. In 1875, Louisa May Alcott was one of his notable clients.

=== Spiritualism ===
Miller converted to spiritualism after attending seances of the Eddy brothers.

=== Vegetarianism ===
Miller became a vegetarian in 1850. He was a dyspeptic and stated that a vegetarian diet aided his recovery. He became interested in vegetarianism through reading the works of Russell Trall. In 1860, Miller spoke at the Eleventh Annual Meeting of the American Vegetarian Society.

In 1909, Miller wrote that "I am over half way to my 81st birthday. I have not eaten flesh, fish or fowl for many years. I do not use milk unless it is sterilized or pasteurized."

== Selected publications ==
- A Treatise on the Cause of Exhausted Vitality (New York: Gray & Green, 1867)
- How to Bathe (New York: American News Company, 1869)
- Dyspepsia (New York: Miller, Haynes & Company, 1870)
- Vital Force (1869)
- The Improved Turkish Bath (New York: Miller, Haynes & Company, 1870)
- A Father's Advice (New York: E. P. Miller, 1881)
- Food of Man Part 1, Part 2 (The Phrenological Journal and Science of Health, 1902)
- Curing Consumption by the Use of the Juices of Vegetables (The Phrenological Journal and Science of Health, 1905)
- Everlasting Life (The Phrenological Journal and Science of Health, 1905)
- Making Vegetarians by the Millions (The Phrenological Journal and Science of Health, 1906)
- The Natural Age of Man (The Phrenological Journal and Science of Health, 1906)
- True Solution to the Money Question (1908)
- What to Eat (The Vegetarian Magazine, 1908)
