= Figs or Pigs? =

1896 treatise on Vegetarianism by James Madison Allen

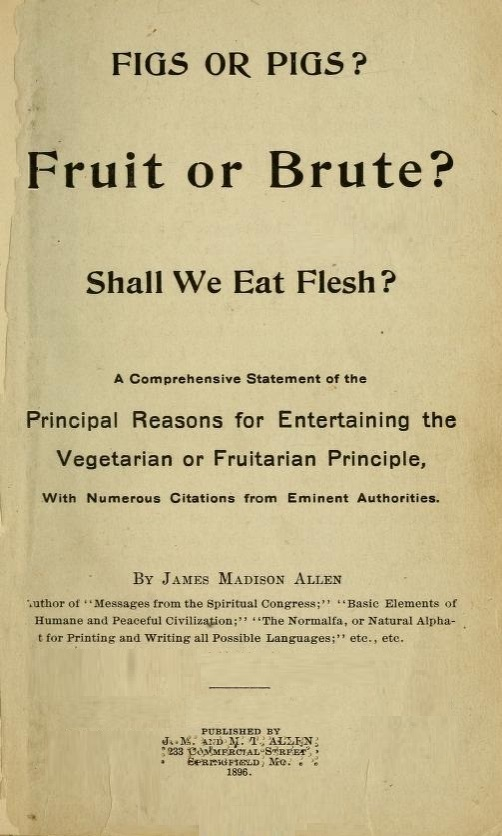
- Title page
- Author: James Madison Allen
- Language: English
- Genre: Vegetarianism
- Publisher: J. M. and M. T. Allen
- Publication date: 1896
- Publication place: United States
- Media type: Print (pamphlet)
- Pages: 39 pp
- ISBN: 9781470164386
- OCLC: 978629468
- LC Class: TX392 .A42
- Text: Figs or Pigs? at Wikisource

Figs or Pigs? is an 1896 manual on vegetarianism and fruitarianism compiled by James Madison Allen, which contains observations from the author, as well as numerous quotations from eminent authors and authorities.

== Background ==
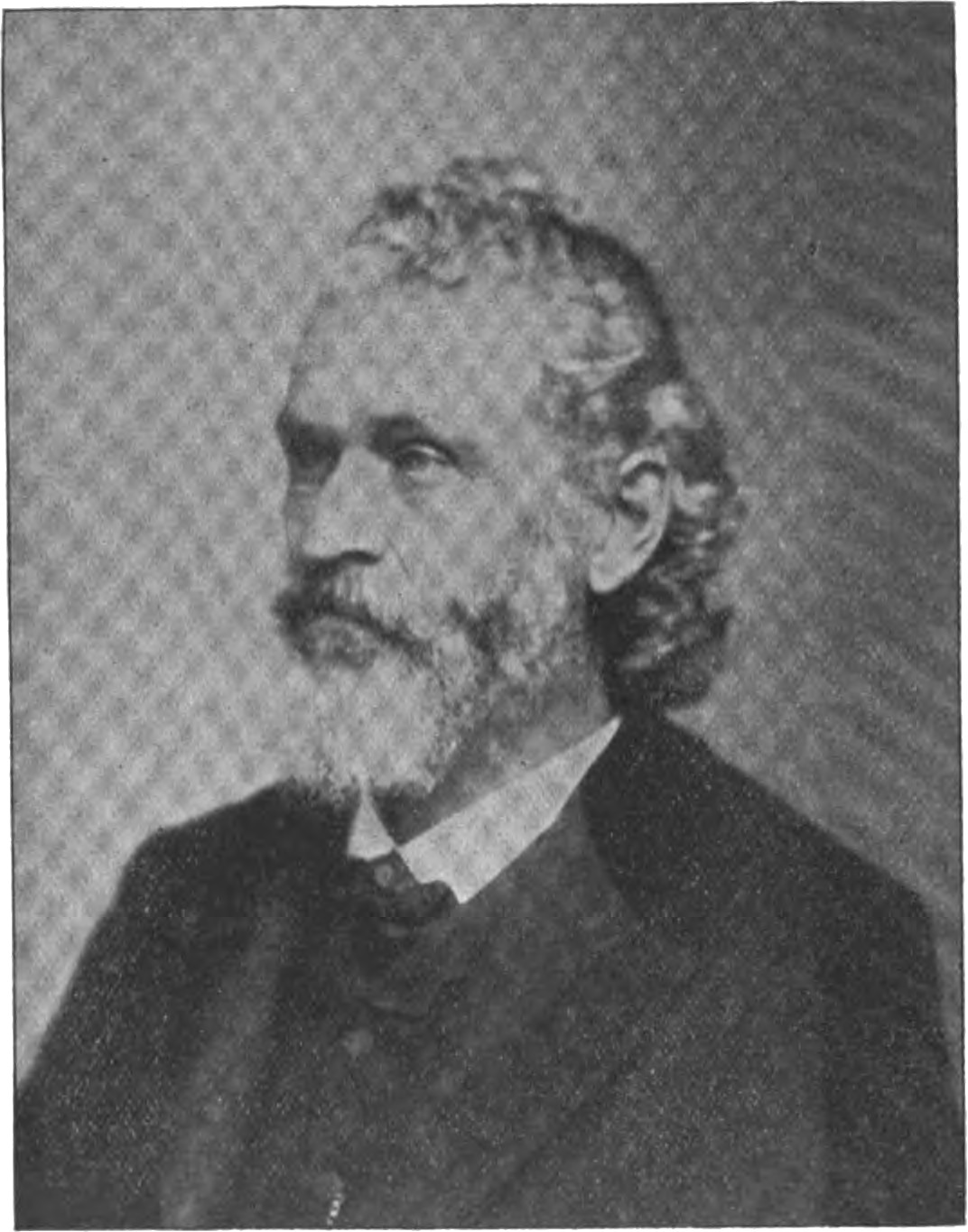
Rev. James Madison Allen, c. 1897

The author, Reverend James Madison Allen, became a vegetarian during his teenage years, after reading, observation, reflection, and instinct led him to determine that the use of animal food "tends to degrade and brutalize the human race." The April 1898 issue of Food, Home and Garden explains that at age sixteen, Allen commenced seven years of academic and collegiate study, taking up the study of phrenology, or the science of measuring the skull to predict mental traits, after a traveling lecturer introduced him to books published by Fowler and Wells, the most prolific disseminator of phrenological materials throughout the nineteenth century. It was during this period of his life that he proposed to his brother to abstain from meat for two weeks, and that he had "never once since eaten nor been tempted to eat a mouthful of dead (or live) hog."

Prior to writing Figs or Pigs?, Allen published Earnest Words: Messages from the Spiritual Congress, a booklet on spirituality and consciousness, Basic Elements of a New System of Life, designed as a foundation of a Humane & Peaceful Civilization, which is on social systems of ethics and spiritual philosophy; and The Normalfa, or Natural Alphabet for Printing and Writing all Possible Languages, which proposes a natural writing system; as well as several other publications.

== Publication ==
The 20 x 12 centimeter pamphlet, Figs or Pigs?, with the subtitle Fruit or Brute? Shall We Eat Flesh?, was published in 1896 by the author and M. T. Allen, from his house at 233 Commercial Street, in Springfield, Missouri. At 39 pages in total length, its publication in 1896 was a revised edition, and was sold as a "new and improved" version. Due to its formal, systematic approach, and the supporting theories which are presented to the reader, it is considered a treatise on vegetarianism, though, currently it is more accurately defined as one on veganism. (Note: Figs or Pigs? refers to the diet as vegetarian. The adopted or vernacular use of the term "vegetarian" refers to products which do not exclusively result in death to the animals. For example, milk, which does not result in death, or eggs, which are considered to be prenatal, and thus, by some medical definition, not living, may still fall under the term of a "vegetarian" diet. The author, however, makes no mention of these products for diet in this work, writing in the opening section that "no food should be used which necessitates slaughter. Even animal milk and its products, and eggs, would better be discarded; preparations of oat milk, etc., the sap of the South American 'cow tree,' nuts, vegetable oils, etc., substituted.") It is self-described as "a comprehensive statement of the principal reasons for entertaining vegetarian and fruitarian principle," by To-Morrow magazine as a "text book of the vegetarian philosophies," and "one of the best Manuels [sic] of Vegetarianism [which] contains a valuable compendium of the arguments for a pure and human diet" by the Food, Home and Garden newsletter.

Limited in its publication, Figs or Pigs? was initially sold for 15 cents per issue, though, by the following decade, the price had increased to 25 cents. It was added to several libraries within the first few years, including the Public Library of the City of Boston. It could also be purchased at request from the author, by writing to his home in Springfield, Missouri. Although Allen was in the Christian ministry, Figs or Pigs? is a vegetarian publication which is markedly not presented in a religious way.

=== Content ===
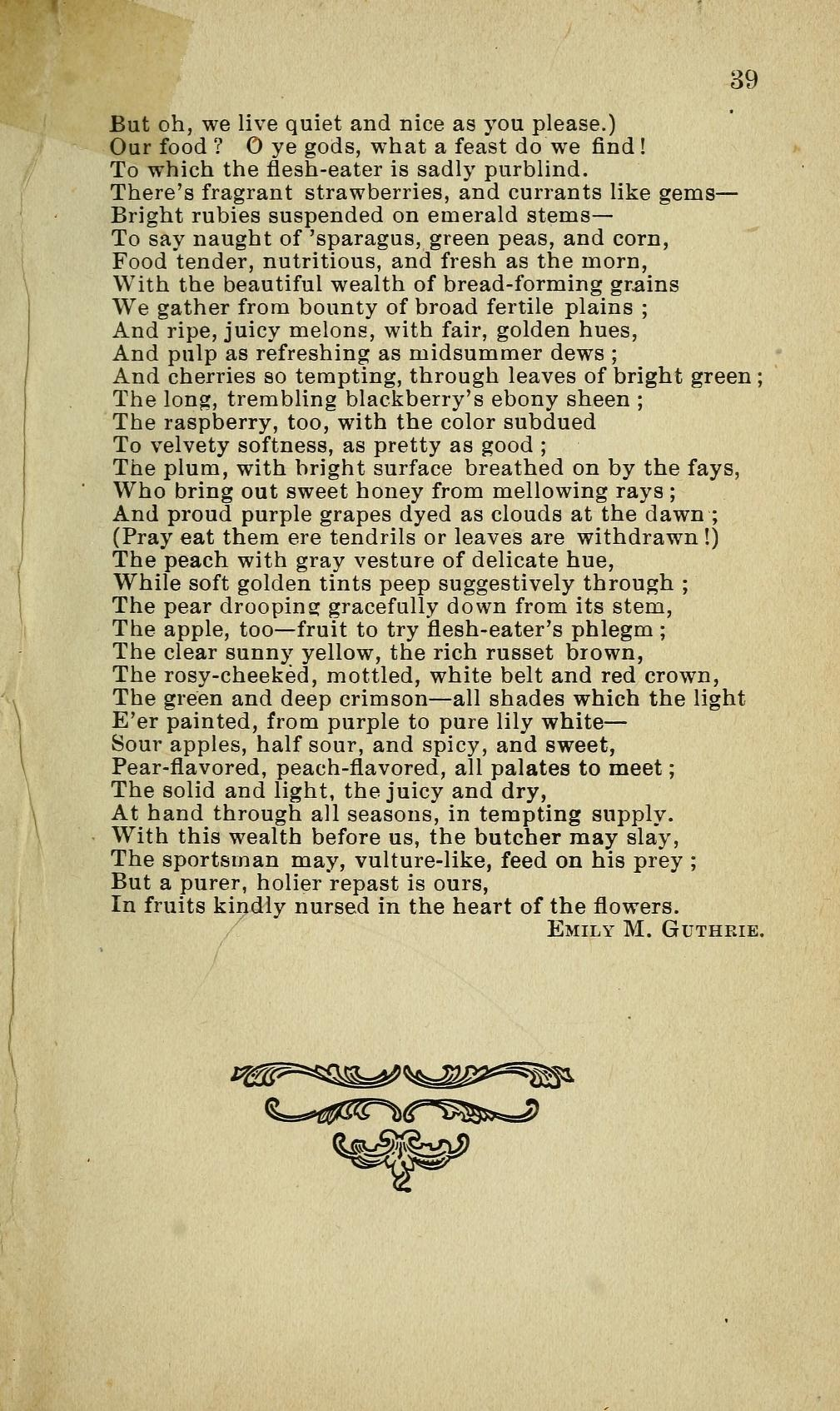
The final page, with a poem by Emily M. Guthrie, "Vegetarian Life"

Figs or Pigs? begins with an opening section, entitled "Preliminary Observations," which addresses the general subject of diet and the elements of nutrition, and the philosophical standings of vegetarianism and fruitarianism in the present society. It is then split into twelve subsections, which are "Anatomical," "Physiological and Hygienical," "Pathological," "Psychological," "Phrenological and Moral," "Chemical," "Agricultural," "Economical and Laborial," "Gustatorial and Sentimental," "Intuitional," "Historical," and "Eventual." At the end of the pamphlet is a "Supplementary" section. Allen writes, in the opening section, that the vegetarian movement has been achieving "such prominence in Europe and America that a convenient and inexpensive Manual or Text Book" which covers the vegetarian and fruitarian philosophies has "become a necessity." Each subsection begins with an overview, followed by four to six excerpts or quotations, regarding the topic.

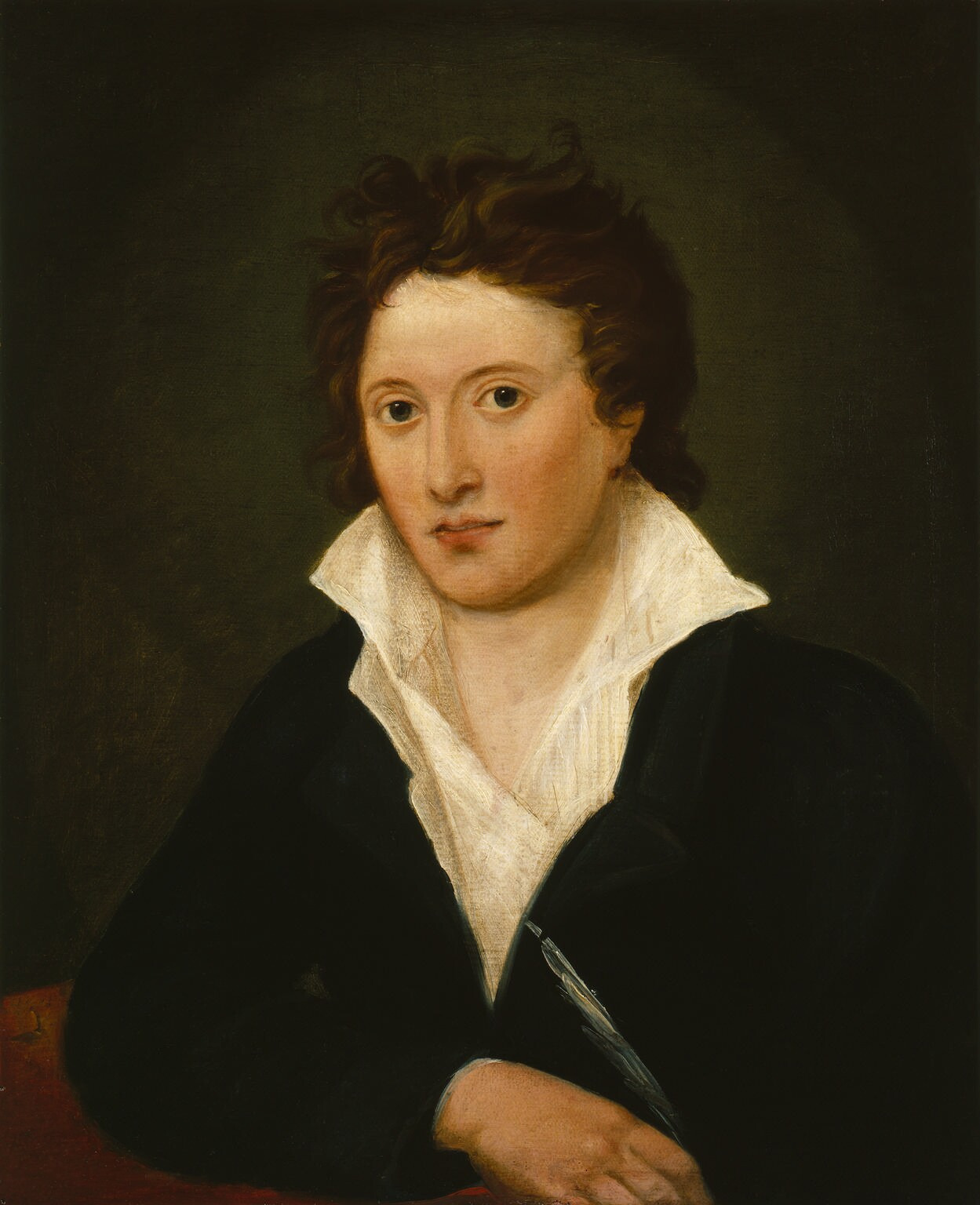
Several quotations by the poet Percy Bysshe Shelley are found in the pamphlet.

The publication is noted, by The Vegetarian Magazine, for containing quotations from leading philosophers, doctors, and authors, such as teacher and philosopher Amos Bronson Alcott, zoologist Baron Cuvier, politician and inventor Benjamin Franklin, doctor and businessman John Harvey Kellogg, naturalist Carl Linnaeus, Greek biographer Plutarch, romantic poet Percy Bysshe Shelley, philosopher and poet Henry David Thoreau, and physician Dr. R. T. Trall. Several news outlets are cited in Figs or Pigs?, including The London Lancet and the New York Tribune, as well as the Encyclopedia Americana. It also contains logical deductions by the author from his own experiences and observations, who himself, was a vegetarian for forty five years at the time of publication. Some of Allen's observations include, that since animals obtain their food, either directly if herbivorous, or indirectly if carnivorous, from the plant kingdom, it "follows that we gain nothing, chemically considered, by taking our sustenance at second hand from the animals," and that "to "own" animals is to be owned by animals." He also, somewhat humorously surmises, that to cook with meat, in the pursuit of health, is "disastrous[,] physically and morally impossible, as to follow the fashion magazines!"

Figs or Pigs? is interspersed with several complete poems, namely, "Civilized Cannibals" by J. O. Barrett, "Song of the Vegetarian" by Arcadian, "Vegetarian Life" by Emily M. Guthrie, and an anonymous poem entitled "The Lesson the Cockroach Taught." It also contains portions of poems, including "Metamorphoses" by the Roman poet Ovid, "A Guiltless Feast" by the Irish novelist Oliver Goldsmith, and fourteen lines excerpted from "Queen Maab" by Shelley.

In the "Historical" subsection, Allen recalls many Greek and Roman officials, who wrote about vegetarianism. He also mentions the Homolgians, or Pythagorians, who were also vegetarians; the Persian emperor Cyrus the Great's conquesting, vegetarian army; and soldiers of the French military leader Napoleon's army, who subsisted on oatmeal and potatoes. References are made, in this subsection, to the longstanding health of tribes which rely primarily on vegetation for food; the many modern cases of outstanding longevity of life from a natural diet; and congregations, such as the Philadelphia's Society of Bible Christians, who boasted more than 100 members of 20 years of vegetarian adherence. There is a list, with remarks, of approximately 50 modern or living vegetarian physicians, dentists, professors, writers, and clergymen.

The subsection "Economical and Laborial" contains a table which compares the cost of raising cattle versus growing various vegetables, noting that the cost of living on "beef alone[...] would require two hundred and sixteen times as many items of cost, as [would] wheat."

In the supplementary section, the author compiles a list of foods derived from the plant kingdom, itemizing what he describes as plants which are mealy, oily, and fleshy, as well as listing roots, stems, and saps, among others.

== Reviews ==
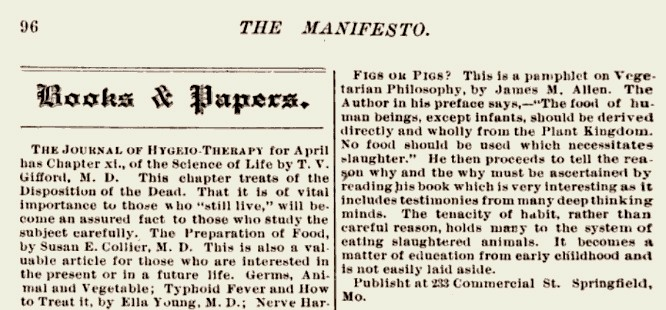
Review, in the right column, as it appears in The Manifesto

Contemporary reviews for Figs or Pigs? were positive. In the year that it was published, Food, Home and Garden calls it a "a very excellent compilation of Vegetarian facts and arguments," while a writer for The Manifesto describes Figs or Pigs? as "interesting [with] testimonies from many deep thinking minds," surmising that it is the "tenacity of habit, rather than careful reason [which] holds many to the system of eating slaughtered animals." 15 years after its publication, The Vegetarian Magazine says, "needless to say the theories and proofs for fruit instead of brute are incontestable," adding that "this is a book which none should fail to read who are looking for reasons for adopting the best diet." The review concludes saying that it is "an interesting and instructive guide to vegetarianism."

The pamphlet is also used as a citation for several publications, regarding veganism, as well as diet and hygiene. Volume II of Hygienic Systems by naturopath Herbert M. Shelton regards Figs or Pigs? as a "little book on fruitarianism which I have in my possession," and responds to the title by saying that the "question is a pertinent one and its correct answer is freighted with increased health and happiness for everyone."

Figs or Pigs? was reprinted in hardcover and paperback in 2016, by London based-publisher Forgotten Books. It has also been made available in eBook format by several digital publishing companies.
