= Natural hygiene =

Natural hygiene can refer to:

- Orthopathy, a school of medical thought founded by Sylvester Graham or Herbert M. Shelton
- The hygiene hypothesis

== See also ==
- Natural Cures movement of Europe
