= Susanna Way Dodds =

American hydrotherapist

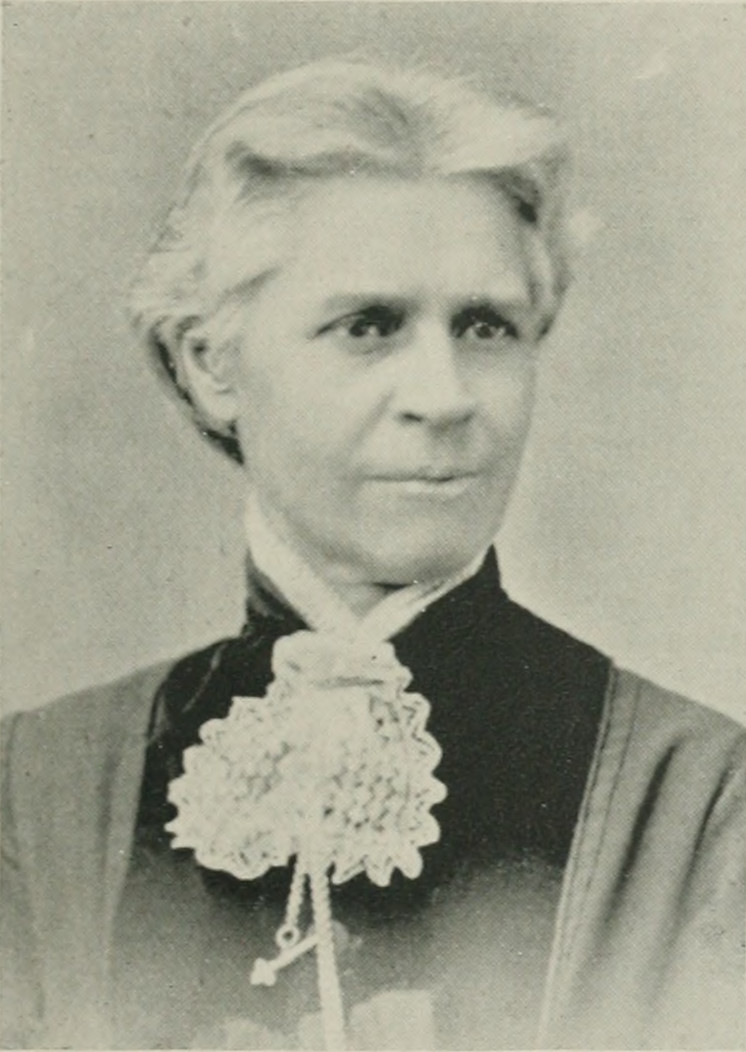
- Born: November 10, 1830; Randolph County, Indiana, United States
- Died: January 20, 1911 (aged 80); Long Beach, California, United States
- Occupations: Physician, writer

Susanna Way Dodds (November 10, 1830 – January 20, 1911) was an American physician, hydrotherapist and natural hygiene proponent.

== Biography ==
Dodds was born in Randolph County, near Richmond, Indiana. She was a vegetarian and advocate of women's rights. Dodds was the fourth woman in America to become a physician. In 1864, she graduated from Russell T. Trall's New York Hygeio-Therapeutic College. Dodds practiced medicine in St. Louis from 1886 to 1909.

Dodds' sister-in-law Mary was also a physician. Dodds and her husband Andrew espoused a hygienic method of treating disease. In 1878, Dodds and her sister opened a sanitarium, the Dodds' Hygeian Home. In 1887, they established the Hygienic College of Physicians and Surgeons in St. Louis, Missouri. They did not use any drugs except in cases for relieving pain. They focused on "natural methods of treatment: diet, exercise, massage, electricity and hydrotherapy in all of its manifold applications". Dodds proposed a strict hygienic vegetarian diet which forbid the consumption of baking powder, meat, milk, soda, spices and sweeteners. She published the magazine, The Sanitarian.

Dodds was Vice-President of the Vegetarian Society of America. Natural hygienist Herbert M. Shelton was influenced by Dodds.

== Death ==
Dodds died on January 20, 1911, from senile debility at Long Beach, California. After Dodds died in 1911, her sister continued to manage the Hygienic College until she sold it in 1912.

== Publications ==
- The Diet Question (1884)
- Health in the Household: Or, Hygienic Cookery (1891)
- Race Culture: Mother and Child (1910)
- Drugless Medicine: Hygeiotherapy (1915)
