= Isaac Jennings =

American physician (1788–1874)

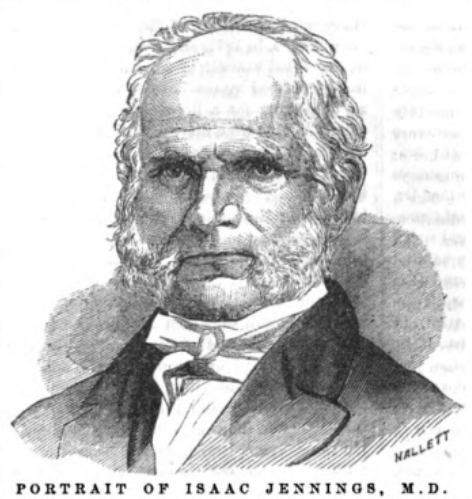
- Born: November 7, 1788; Fairfield, Connecticut
- Died: March 13, 1874 (aged 85); Oberlin, Ohio
- Occupations: Physician, writer

Isaac Jennings (November 7, 1788 – March 13, 1874) was an American medical doctor and writer who pioneered orthopathy (natural hygiene).

== Biography ==
Jennings was born on November 7, 1788, in Fairfield, Connecticut. He studied medicine with Eli Ives of New Haven. He was licensed to practice medicine and located himself in Trumbull, Connecticut. He moved his practice to Derby, Connecticut, in 1820. Jennings graduated from Yale School of Medicine in 1812. He obtained his M.D. from Yale in 1828.

Jennings practiced conventional medicine for many years but became discouraged with its results. In 1822, Jennings began to give his patients without knowledge, placebos of bread pills and coloured water tonics. His patients health improved but caused controversy when his secret was revealed and his patients requested medicine. He refused to prescribe medicine and his career was damaged. It was noted that "his unorthodox view involved him in many controversies and diminished his practice to some extent." The experiment convinced him that drugs were worthless and by the 1830s, he even discarded placebos. He believed that only nature could "restore her damaged machinery and revitalize it." He described medicine as a "gross delusion".

In 1839, he became a member of the Board of Trustees of the Oberlin College. In 1847 at the college, he wrote his book Medical Reform. In his 1867 book The Tree of Life, he defined orthopathy as "from orthos, right, true, erect; and pathos, affection. Nature is always upright—moving in the right direction." His system of orthopathy was known as the "do-nothing cure", "do-nothing mode of treating disease", "let alone plan" and the "no-medicine plan". He prescribed bathing, rest and a vegetarian diet as part of his system.

His no-medicine plan was based on the idea of vitalism. He believed that nature does its best to keep the human system in health and to give the best opportunity for the "vital forces" to work, the patient must rest and not be disturbed by medicine or stimulants. He was a congregationalist and deacon in Derby and Oberlin. Jennings was a temperance activist and opposed the use of alcohol and all drugs. He was a vegetarian and opposed the consumption of coffee, tea, tobacco, meat and spices. He considered the use of coffee and tea to be injurious and a "great sin in the church".

In 1867, the Buffalo Medical and Surgical Journal described Jennings' methods of utilizing bread pills as "down right quackery and imposition" and a "disgrace to the regular profession". A review of his book The Tree of Life suggested it was "without a particle of merit" and the ideas would not be popular with people of the present day.

Jennings died of pneumonia on March 13, 1874, in Oberlin, Ohio.

Jennings influenced many natural hygienists including Felix L. Oswald, Russell T. Trall, Herbert M. Shelton, Hilton Hotema and many others. He has been listed as a father of the hygiene movement.

== Publications ==
- Medical Reform: A Treatise on Man's Physical Being and Disorders (1847)
- The Philosophy of Human Life (1852)
- The Tree of Life: Or, Human Degeneracy, its Nature and Remedy: Based on the Elevating Principle of Orthopathy (1867)

== See also ==
- Sylvester Graham
