= National Health Association =

The National Health Association (NHA) is a 501(c)(3) nonprofit organization in the United States that promotes the health benefits of a plant-based diet

== History ==
The NHA was established as the American Natural Hygiene Society in 1948. One of the NHA's co-founders, Herbert Shelton, served as its first president. In 1998, the organization changed its name to the National Health Association.

== Activities ==
With the goal of educating the public on natural health practices, the NHA provides resources, organizes conferences, and publishes a magazine quarterly. The magazine is called Health Science.

== See also ==
- Herbert M. Shelton
