= American Vegetarian Party =

Largely defunct American political party

The American Vegetarian Party was a United States political party formed on July 28, 1947 at the Commodore Hotel in New York City, New York. It was founded by a group of five hundred delegates to the American Naturopathic Association's 1947 convention. The party held conventions and nominated candidates for President and Vice-President in several national elections, although they never seriously pursued ballot access or official recognition as a political party by election officials.

== Historical Vegetarian Party presidential tickets ==
=== 1948 ===
In 1947, 500 hundred delegates to the convention of the American Naturopathic Association (held in Manhattan, New York City) formed the party, and nominated its presidential ticket for the 1948 presidential election:

- John Maxwell (presidential nominee) - Maxwell was born in England, and thus determined to be ineligible to serve as president
- Symon Gould (vice-presidential nominee)

=== 1952 ===
- Daniel J. Murphy (Vegetarian Party presidential nominee) - Herbert C. Holdridge was originally the party's 1952 nominee for president, but in October, he withdrew and was replaced by Daniel J. Murphy.
- Symon Gould (1952 Vegetarian Party vice-presidential nominee)

=== 1956 ===
- Herbert M. Shelton (Vegetarian Party presidential nominee)
- Symon Gould (1956 Vegetarian Party vice-presidential nominee)

=== 1960 ===
- Symon Gould (1960 Vegetarian Party presidential nominee)
- Christopher Gian-Cursio (1960 Vegetarian Party vice-presidential nominee)

=== 1964 ===
- Symon Gould (nominated as 1964 Vegetarian Party candidate for president; however, Gould died in 1963)
- Abram Wolfson (1964 Vegetarian Party vice-presidential nominee)
