= Elma Gove =

American painter (1832–1921)

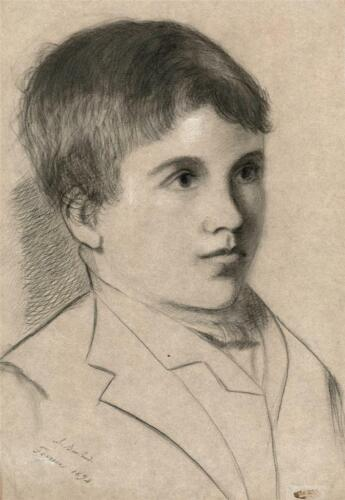
Elma Mary Gove (1832–1921)

Elma Mary Gove (1832–1921) was an American painter.

== Biography ==
Born in Weare, New Hampshire, Gove was the daughter of Hiram and Mary Sargent Gove; her father was a hatmaker who later became a self-trained physician, and her mother was an early advocate for women's rights. By 1848 the couple was estranged. They divorced in that year – one precipitating event was Hiram's kidnapping of Elma, which her mother soon put right. Mary soon remarried, and Elma travelled to New York City to study as an artist; in 1848 she enrolled in the antique class of the National Academy of Design for the year. She identified herself upon registration as a "painter", suggesting that she already had some experience in the role. With the annual show of 1849, at which she exhibited three crayon portraits, she began to participate in the Academy's exhibitions. Over the following fifteen years she continued to work in crayon, but she branched out into oils as well; at the 1851 annual exhibition she showed two portraits, including one of Eliphalet Nott. Gove continued showing at the Academy until 1864; she also presented work at the Pennsylvania Academy of the Fine Arts and the Boston Athenaeum. She was mainly a portraitist, but produced genre pieces and religious works as well. Her paintings were owned by James Renwick Brevoort and Edward W. Nichols, among others, and a portrait by her of Nichols is in the collection of the National Academy of Design.

Gove lived in New York from around 1849 at least until 1855; in 1857 and 1858 she is known to have been in Cincinnati. While there, she received a medal in 1857 for her crayon drawings, which she exhibited at the annual show of the Ohio Mechanics' Institute. Among her patrons in the city was Henry Worrall, who loaned one of her charcoal portraits to an exhibition of the Cincinnati Associated Artists in 1866. By 1859 she was back in Brooklyn, briefly, before establishing a studio at 806 Broadway. There she remained at least until 1864. By 1866 she was giving her address as Paris when providing work for exhibits; in 1870 she was noted as being on her way to Great Malvern. She married one Thomas Letchworth soon after arriving in England, and the couple had two children. It appears that she remained in England for the rest of her life.
