= Sanford Bennett =

American businessman

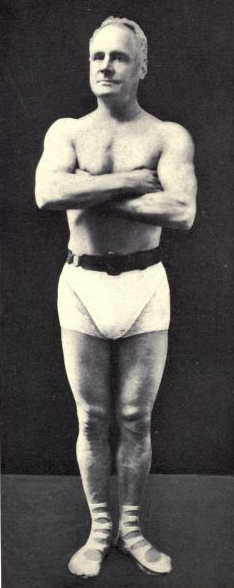
- Born: 1841; Philadelphia
- Died: 1926
- Occupation(s): Businessman, writer

Sanford Bennett (1841–1926) was an American businessman and writer associated with the physical culture movement, best known for his publications on anti-aging and natural hygiene.

== Biography ==
Bennett was born in Philadelphia. He invented an extensive exercise regime of self-care that involved muscular contraction and relaxation exercises for rejuvenating the body. His ideas were popularized in the San Francisco Chronicle in 1906 and in two books. Bennett added medical diagrams of the muscles and organs of the body to his descriptions of exercise routines. Bennett claimed that his exercise regime gave him youthful vigour and made him healthy and stronger. His exercises could be carried out in bed for a quarter or half-hour.

Bennett endorsed periodic fasting and a vegetarian diet characterized by "well-cooked vegetables". He recommended "nature's principal methods of inducing health—sunlight, pure air, pure water, nourishing food, cleanliness and exercise". His book Old Age, Its Cause and Prevention was published at least four times between 1912 and 1927. It was advertised by Bernarr Macfadden's Physical Culture Publishing Company. Bennett was a close friend of Bernarr Macfadden and his wife, Mary. He helped Macfadden to edit the Physical Culture magazine. Bennett practiced some strange eating habits. For example, he would regurgitate his food after a meal by vomiting in a brass bowl. Mary called him the "Old Roman Regurgitator."

Bennett died from choking on a chicken bone.

== Reception ==
Bennett's Exercising in Bed was reviewed in the Nature journal, which concluded "we have no doubt that the exercises suggested, if carried out, would be of considerable benefit, even if they did not actually rejuvenate or restore good looks, as the author claims."

Historian James F. Stark has commented that Bennett was "one of the most high-profile advocates of rejuvenating methods in the twentieth century prior to the First World War, and his exercises, promising rejuvenation at an old age, were hugely popular, particularly in the United States, as he embodied the powerful cultural cache of the physical culture movement, then at its height."

== Publications ==
- Exercising in Bed (1907)
- Old Age, Its Cause and Prevention (1912)
