= William Lambe (physician) =

English physician and vegan activist (1765–1847)

William Lambe FRCP
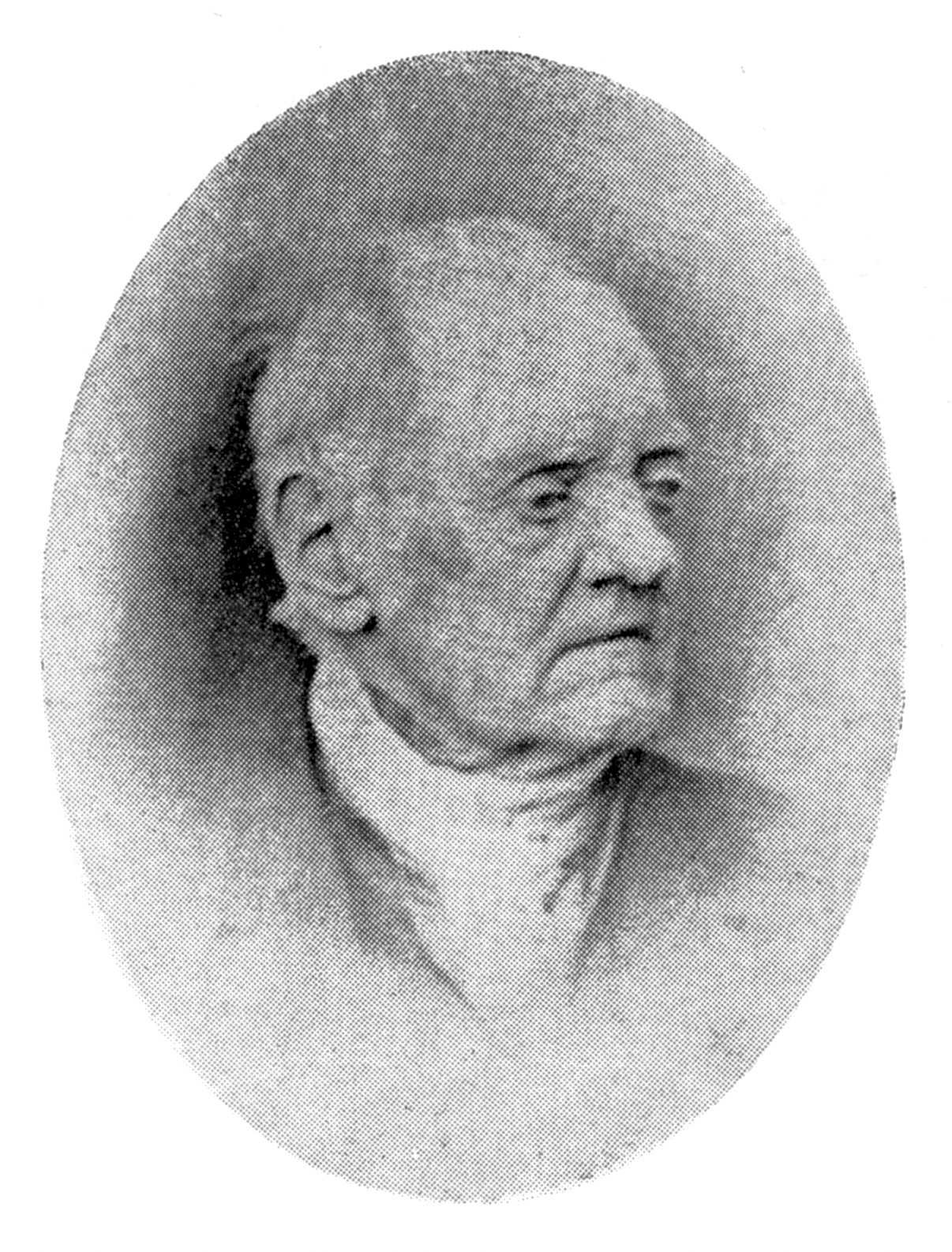
- Born: 26 February 1765; Warwick, England
- Died: 11 June 1847 (aged 82); Dilwyn, England
- Education: St John's College, Cambridge
- Occupations: Physician, writer

William Lambe (26 February 1765 – 11 June 1847) was an English physician and early veganism activist. He has been described as a pioneer of vegan nutrition.

== Biography ==
William Lambe was born in Warwick, the son of Lacon Lambe, a Hereford attorney. He was educated at Hereford Grammar School, where he was head boy, and St John's College, Cambridge, graduating B.D. (as fourth wrangler) in 1786, M.B. in 1789, and M.D. in 1802. He was admitted a fellow of his college on 11 March 1788.

In 1790 Lambe took over the practice of a Warwick friend and in the same year published his 'Analyses of the Leamington Water'. The results of further minute chemical examination of these waters were published by him in the fifth volume of the 'Transactions' of the Philosophical Society of Manchester. Moving to London about 1800, Lambe was admitted a Fellow of the College of Physicians in 1804, becoming a censor (examiner) and delivering the Croonian Lecture on several occasions between 1806 and 1828 and the Harveian Oration in 1818.

Lambe's London practice was in King's Road (now Theobald's Road), Bedford Row, where he attended three times a week. Many of his patients were needy people, from whom he would accept no fees. He retired from medical practice about 1840.

Lambe died on 11 June 1847 at Dilwyn, Herefordshire, and is buried in the family vault in the churchyard there. His son, William Lacon Lambe, also studied medicine and graduated M.B. in 1820 from Caius College, Cambridge.

== Vegetarianism ==
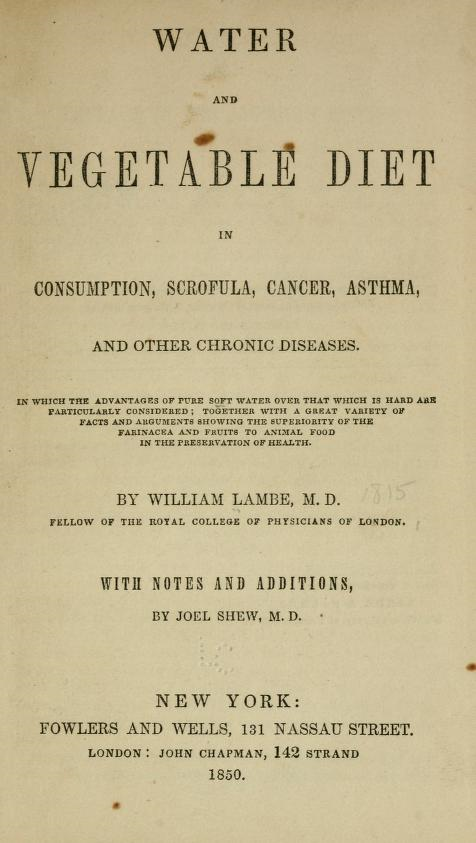
Water and Vegetable Diet, 1850 edition

Lambe was considered an eccentric by his contemporaries, mainly on the ground that he was a strict, but not fanatical, vegetarian and that his favourite prescription was filtered water.

Lambe suffered from a variety of chronic diseases so gave up animal food in 1806 and embraced a vegetable and distilled water diet. His health improved so he continued the diet on a permanent basis. Lambe tried the diet on several of his patients and published the results in a book in 1815. In 1816, there was an extensive review of Lambe's book in The Medico-Chirurgical Journal and Review. Lambe converted his patient John Frank Newton to vegetarianism.

Lambe believed that a distilled water and vegetarian diet could cure almost every known disease, including cancer. Lambe ate a very simple diet. For breakfast he ate bread with fruit or salad. His dinner consisted of vegetables, a pie, often an onion dumpling. For supper, he ate the same as his breakfast. Lambe did not drink coffee or tea and always walked, no matter the weather. As Lambe did not consume dairy or meat products, he has been described as an "early vegan pioneer".

Lambe's ideas were not popular amongst the medical community of his day. In 1843, Jonathan Pereira commented that Lambe "gained few, if any proselytes to his opinions and practice."

Lambe influenced the vegetarian movement in the United Kingdom. In The Ethics of Diet, 1833 Howard Williams concluded that "Dr. Lambe occupies an eminent position in the medical literature of vegetarianism, and he divides with his predecessor, Dr. Cheyne, the honour of being the founder of scientific dietetics in this country."

In 1873, Inspector-General Edward Hare authored a biography of Lambe.

== Works ==
He published a number of written works, including:

- Researches into the Properties of Spring Water, with Medical Cautions against the use of Lead in Water Pipes, Pumps, Cisterns, &c., 1803, 8vo.
- A Medical and Experimental Enquiry into the Origin, Symptoms, and Cure of Constitutional Diseases, particularly Scrofula, Consumption, Cancer, and Gout, 1805, 8vo; republished, with notes and additions by Joel Shew, New York, 1854.
- Reports of the Effects of a Peculiar Regimen on Scirrhous Tumours and Cancerous Ulcers, 1809, 8vo. The British Museum copy contains a manuscript letter from the author to Lord Erskine, and some remarks upon the work by the latter.
- Additional Reports on the Effects of a Peculiar Regimen, &c., London, 1815, 8vo. Extracts from these two works, with a preface and notes by E. Hare, and written in the corresponding style of phonography by I. Pitman, were published at Bath in 1869, 12mo.
- An Investigation of the Properties of Thames Water, London, 1828, 8vo.
- — (August 10, 1844). "On the Possibility of Supporting Life on a Vegetable Diet". The Lancet. 43 (1093): 610. doi:10.1016/S0140-6736(02)34347-2. PMC 10390020.
- Water and Vegetable Diet in Consumption, Scrofula, Cancer, Asthma, and Other Chronic Diseases, with notes and additions, by Joel Shew, M.D., New York: Fowlers and Wells, 1854.
