= Felix Leopold Oswald =

American naturalist and secularist

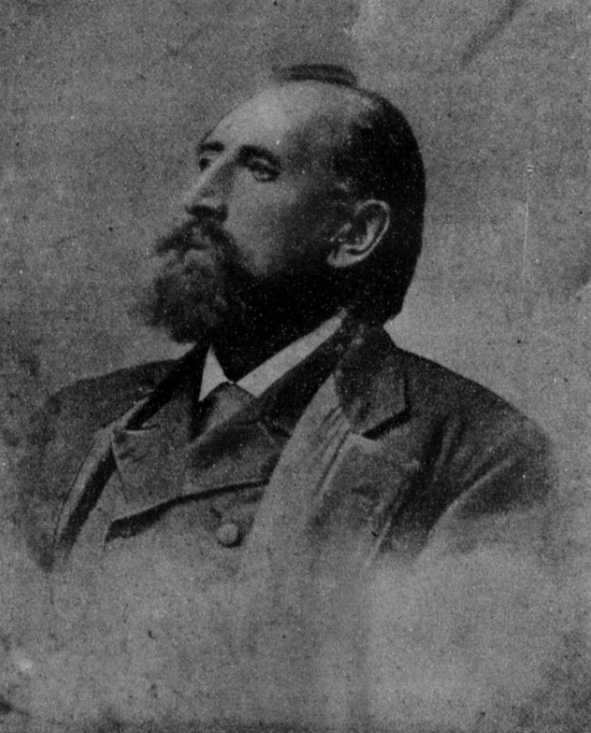
- Born: December 6, 1845; Namur, Belgium
- Died: September 27, 1906 (aged 60); Syracuse, New York
- Occupations: Physician, writer

Felix Leopold Oswald (December 6, 1845 – September 27, 1906) was a Belgian American physician, naturalist, secularist and freethought writer.

== Biography ==
Oswald was born in Namur, Belgium. He graduated from Brussels University in 1865. He studied at Gottingen and Heidelberg where he obtained his M.A. and M.D. degrees. In 1866, as a military doctor he joined a corps of Belgian volunteers in support of Emperor Maximilian I of Mexico. He travelled in Mexico and later settled in the United States.

Oswald was a conservationist. He was concerned about the negative effects of deforestation. He urged a legislative act to protect "the woods of all the upper ridges in hill countries." His writings on natural history experienced an extensive international readership.

He wrote many scientific articles. His articles were published in the Popular Science magazine, The Monist journal, The Open Court journal and the North American Review.

Oswald lived as a hermit and traveller, cooking his meals over an open fire. He was dubbed "the monkey man" as he had two or three pet monkeys that he allowed to move freely in his house. In 1905, his house including his monkeys were set on fire and destroyed.

== Natural hygiene ==
Oswald was supportive of natural hygiene, a movement which advocated fasting, vegetarian dieting, pure water, clean air and exercise. In 1889, Oswald wrote a series of articles under the general title, International Health Studies for John Harvey Kellogg's Good Health journal. Oswald was an anti-vaccinationist and associated with Bernarr Macfadden. In 1901, Macfadden's publishing company released Oswald's book Vaccination a Crime.

Oswald was influenced by Sylvester Graham, he referred to fasting as "the Graham starvation cure."

== Religion ==
Oswald was a freethought writer and naturalist who did not believe in the supernatural. Oswald has been described as an outspoken freethinker and one of the greatest advocates of the American freethought world.

He authored the book The Secret of the East in 1883 and an article in 1891 that argued Christianity was of Buddhist origin. Lewis G. Janes suggested that this idea was "discredited at the outset by the totally different conceptions of the God idea and the destiny of man after death in the two religions." James Thompson Bixby wrote a rebuttal to Oswald's article. He argued that "the resemblances alleged by Dr. Oswald, even if granted, would be insufficient to prove his case... the differences between the Gospel and Buddhism run deeper and are more positive than the like-nesses."

Edwin Arnold wrote that Oswald rejected the myths of Buddha and Christ for secular humanism, and that writers such as Oswald who wanted to "prove that Christianity was derived from Buddhism was a way of undermining its authority." Biblical scholars have rejected the theory that Christianity originated from Buddhism.

Oswald was influenced by the research of Rudolf Seydel. Orientalist Friedrich Max Müller rejected Oswald's thesis but respected his dedication to the subject. Müller commented that Oswald was "one of the more conscientious and fair-minded students of Buddhism."

== Death ==
Oswald died from a train crash at Syracuse, New York on September 27, 1906. Obituaries have described it as a tragic accident, whilst railway employees reported that he had committed suicide.

== Selected publications ==
- Oswald, F. L. (1877). The Climatic Influence of Vegetation — A Plea for Our Forests. Popular Science Monthly 11: 385–390.
- Summerland Sketches, or Rambles in the Backwoods of Mexico and Central America (1880)
- Physical Education; Or, The Health-Laws of Nature (1882)
- The Secret of the East: Or, the Origin of the Christian Religion (1883)
- Zoological Sketches: A Contribution to the Out-Door Study of Natural History (London: W. H. Allen, 1883)
- Household Remedies, for the Prevalent Disorders of the Human Organism (1885)
- Days and Nights in the Tropics (1887)
- The Poison Problem (1887)
- The Bible of Nature: Or, the Principles of Secularism: A Contribution to the Religion of the Future (1888)
- Oswald, F. L. (1891). Was Christ a Buddhist?. The Arena 3 (1): 193–201.
- Body and Mind (1901)
- Oriental Athletes (Physical Culture, 1901)
- Vaccination a Crime: With Comments on Other Sanitary Superstitions (Physical Culture Publishing Company, 1901)
- Macfadden's Fasting, Hydropathy and Exercise (1903)
- Vitality: How to Acquire and Conserve It (1905)
