= Arnold DeVries =

American alternative health writer

- Born: November 30, 1921; Kesley, Iowa, U.S.
- Died: February 16, 1996 (aged 74); Greene, Iowa, U.S.
- Occupation: Alternative health writer

Arnold Paul DeVries (November 30, 1921 – February 16, 1996) was an American natural hygienist, alternative health writer and pioneer of the Paleolithic diet. He authored several books on health and diet. He collaborated with the white supremacist Ben Klassen on his 1982 book, Salubrious Living.

== Early life ==
Arnold Paul DeVries was born in Kesley, Iowa, on November 30, 1921, and graduated from Aplington High School in 1939. He attended the University of Iowa. During World War II, he worked at an aircraft plant, and at the end of the war he worked as a bus driver in Los Angeles.

== Writings and views ==
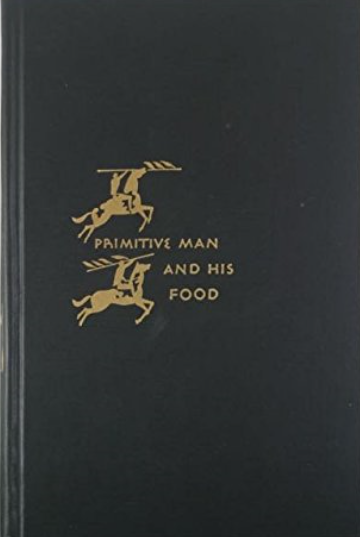
Primitive Man and His Food, 1952

His 1946 book, Fountain of Youth, advocated a fruitarian raw food diet. He later distanced himself from this viewpoint, consumed animal products, and embraced a Paleolithic diet in Primitive Man and His Food, 1952. He also started his own publishing company, Chandler Book Company. DeVries was associated with the Universal Church of the Master and was an ordained minister. The Universal Church of the Master is a religious organization that takes influence from Christianity and spiritualism. DeVries was involved in the natural hygiene movement. He recommended exercise, fasting, sleep, and avoidance of medical drugs.

DeVries was the co-author of Ben Klassen's 1982 book Salubrious Living. Twenty-one of the book’s twenty-two chapters were written by DeVries. It was basically a reprint of his 1946 book The Fountain of Youth. Klassen noted that apart from the introduction and last chapter on eugenics, "the entire balance of the text has been written by Arnold DeVries, who compiled the study in an excellent book entitled The Fountain of Youth." Historian George Michael noted that it was "surprising that DeVries would collaborate with Klassen with whom he seemingly disagreed on many issues." For example, DeVries admired Pacific Islanders for their physical beauty and criticized the dieting and lifestyles of Western culture. The book endorses fasting, sunbathing, fruitarian, and raw food dieting. DeVries eschewed medical treatment and believed that fasting could treat most illnesses.

DeVries believed that correct diet and exercise would improve one's beauty and health. He gave specific instructions for women to be fit mates for strong males. Klassen promoted this idea to "upgrade" the white race by improving the offspring. In the 1990s, Tommy Rydén, a Swedish white supremacist, founded the DeVries Institute, named after DeVries, through which he translated esoteric white supremacist health writings.

== Personal life and death ==
He married Dorice E. Shemtob in 1959, she died in 1981. He married Mary K. Parmely in 1981, they divorced in 1993. He had three daughters.

He died in Greene, Iowa, on February 16, 1996, from cancer.

== Publications ==
- Nude Culture (1946)
- The Fountain of Youth (1946)
- Primitive Man and His Food (1952)
- The Elixir of Life (1952)
- Dangers In Modern Foods (1958)
- Health From the Soil (1958)
- Therapeutic Fasting (1963)
- Salubrious Living (with Ben Klassen, 1982)

== See also ==
- Walter L. Voegtlin
