= Gustav Schlickeysen =

German naturopath (1843–1893)

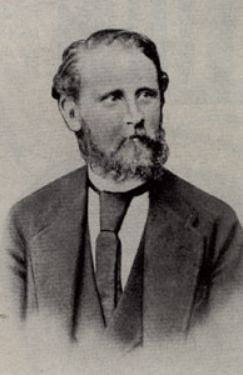
- Born: September 9, 1843; Berlin, Germany
- Died: 1893 (aged 49–50); Jersey City, New Jersey, U.S.
- Occupations: Naturopath, writer

Gustav Schlickeysen (September 9, 1843 – 1893) was a German naturopath and raw food advocate.

== Biography ==
In 1875, Schlickeysen attacked meat-eating for causing militarism and a "roaming, savage and warlike life". He argued that Germans should embrace a fruit and grain diet, appropriate to their natural home in the forest. He has been described as an "early propagandist of vegetarianism."

Schlickeysen was a fruitarian who proposed the use of "fruit medicine", he believed that raw fruits were "sunlight nutrition". He authored the book Fruit and Bread: A Scientific Diet, which advocated an uncooked diet of fruits, grains and nuts. It was translated by Martin Luther Holbrook. In 1877, Francis William Newman President of the Vegetarian Society criticized the book for condemning beans, lentils, honey, tea and all cooked foods. Newman considered Schlickeysen a "pernicious foe to our society" and the book fanatical.

== Publications ==
- Fruit and Bread: A Scientific Diet (Translated from the German by M. L. Holbrook, 1877)
