= Charles Edward Page =

American physician

Charles E. Page
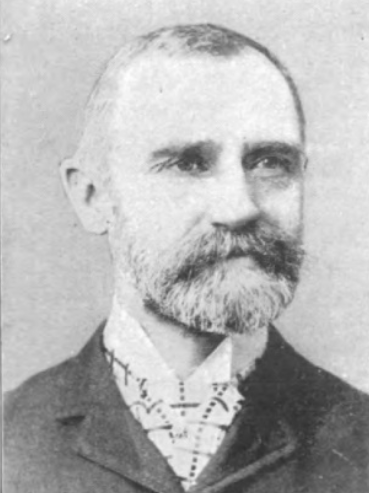
- Born: February 23, 1840; Norridgewock, Maine
- Died: November 23, 1925 (aged 85); Melrose Highlands, Massachusetts
- Occupations: Physician, hydrotherapist

Charles Edward Page (February 23, 1840 – November 23, 1925), was an American physician, hydrotherapist, natural hygiene advocate and anti-vaccinationist.

== Biography ==
Page was born in Norridgewock, Maine on February 23, 1840. Page was educated at the Eclectic Medical College, New York City. During the American Civil War, he enlisted as a private in the Thirteenth Massachusetts Volunteers. He was shot in the neck at Fredericksburg and for bravery was promoted as Lieutenant in the 87th Regiment, United States Colored Infantry. In 1863, Page was captured by Confederates at Brazier City and was held as prisoner of war for thirteen months. He was exchanged in 1864.

He practiced medicine in Boston. Page is listed in the 1902 medical registry as a "Form B" physician, which meant that he had applied for registration before January 1, 1895 and had practiced medicine for several years in Massachusetts up to June 7, 1894. He worked as a regular physician.

Page practiced hydrotherapy and defended the ideas of Simon Baruch. He was associated with the physical culture movement and wrote articles for Bernarr Macfadden's Physical Culture magazine. He was an early advocate of therapeutic fasting, which he believed could cure obesity.

== Anti-vaccination ==
Page was an opponent of vaccination. He criticized the germ theory of disease and defended the anti-vaccinationist Immanuel Pfeiffer. Page promoted the idea that improved sanitation was more effective than preventing smallpox than vaccination. He contended that smallpox could be eliminated if slum districts, houses, and backyards were completely cleansed. He 1916, he commented that the medical community were taking "coincidence for evidence", by attributing the decline in smallpox to vaccination, rather than to sanitation.

== Selected publications ==
- Horses: Their Feed and Their Feet (Fowler & Wells, 1883)
- The Natural Cure of Consumption (Fowler & Wells, 1884)
- Pneumonia and Typhoid Fever: A Study (Damrell & Upham, 1891)
- The Successful Treatment of Typhoid Fever. (Arena, 1892)
- What is Man's Natural Food (The Dental Register, 1896)
- Physiological Treatment (St. Louis Medical Gazette, 1898)
- Pneumonia: Points on Treatment (Health, 1899)
- Physiological, Or Rational, Treatment for Typhoid Fever (St. Louis Medical Gazette, 1899)
- Revolt of the Anti-Compulsory Vaccinationists in Boston (Physical Culture, 1901)
- Random Shots at the Unnaturalists: Hygienic vs. Unhygienic Methods (Physical Culture, 1902)
- Where Does Hygiene Lead Us With Reference to the Matters of Prevention of Cure of Disease (Physical Culture, 1902)
- Another View of the Bathing Problem (Physical Culture, 1903)
- Climate, Clothing and Suicides (The Dietetic & Hygienic Gazette, 1903)
- Curative Treatment of Pneumonia, with Points on Hydrotherapy and Therapeutic Fasting in Fevers (Medical Record, 1905)
