= Joel Shew =

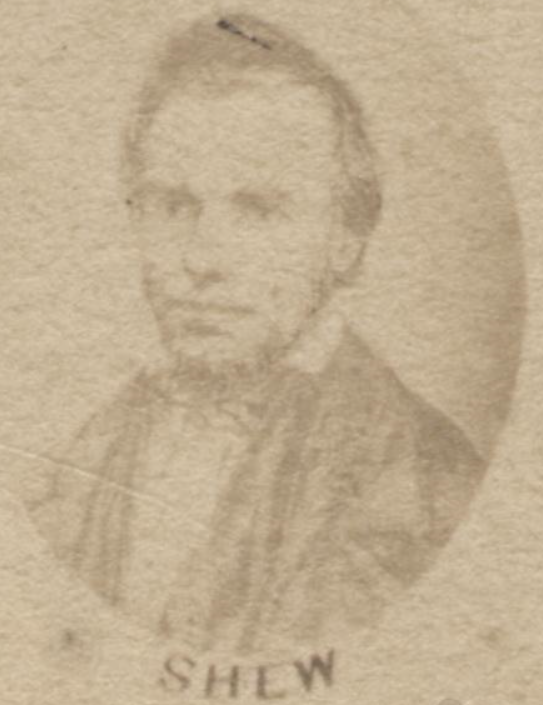
- Born: November 13, 1816; Providence, New York
- Died: October 6, 1855 (aged 38); Oyster Bay, Long Island
- Occupations: Hydrotherapist, writer

Joel Shew (November 13, 1816 – October 6, 1855) was an American medical doctor, hydrotherapist, and natural hygiene advocate.

== Biography ==
Shew was born in Providence, Saratoga County. He initially worked in a daguerreotype shop in Philadelphia before obtaining his medical degree in 1843. Shew developed an interest in hydrotherapy and traveled to Gräfenberg to study Vincenz Priessnitz's techniques. His wife, Marie Louise Shew, was also a hydrotherapist. They were friends with Mary Gove Nichols, who had temporarily lodged at their home. The Shews operated a hydrotherapy "water-cure" house and welcomed patients.

In 1844, Shew established the first water-cure institution in New York City. In May 1845, he opened the New Lebanon Springs Water-Cure Establishment, an institution costing approximately US$3,000. He served as the co-owner and advising physician, while David Campbell managed the institution for ten years. Shew was influenced by Sylvester Graham's dietary principles and promoted natural hygiene practices, including regular bathing, exercise, massage, and abstention from alcohol and tobacco. Historian Stephen Nissenbaum noted that "it is clear that Shew was a Grahamite before he discovered the water-cure". Both Shew and his wife were vegetarians.

In 1850, Shew contributed notes and additions to the American edition of William Lambe's Water and Vegetable Diet. He died in Oyster Bay, Long Island. An autopsy revealed that he had an enlarged liver and internal lesions, possibly due to chemical exposure from his earlier career as a photographer.

== The Water-Cure Journal ==
In 1845, Shew launched The Water-Cure Journal, which gained significant popularity and, by 1850, had a subscription list of 50,000. Russell Trall took over as editor in 1849, and the journal was later renamed The Herald of Health.

== Selected publications ==
- Facts in Hydropathy or Water Cure (1844)
- Water-Cure for Ladies (Marie Louise Shew, revised by Joel Shew, 1844)
- Hydropathy, Or, The Water-Cure (1845)
- The Water-Cure Manual (1847)
- Tobacco: Its History, Nature, and Effects on the Body and Mind (1849)
- Water and Vegetable Diet (William Lambe, notes and additions by Joel Shew, 1850)
- Consumption: Its Prevention and Cure by the Water Treatment (1851)
- The Hydropathic Family Physician (1854)
