= George S. Weger =

American physician (1874–1935)

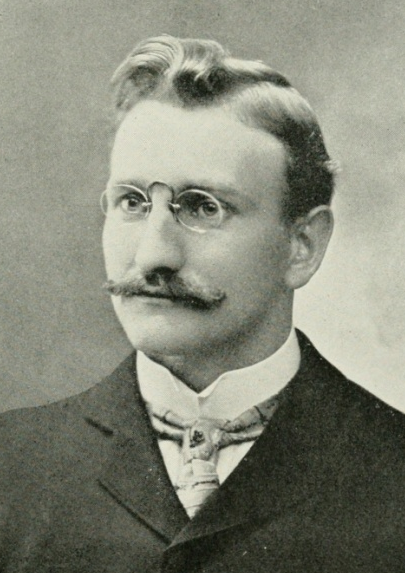
- Born: George Stephen Weger; September 2, 1874; Baltimore, Maryland, U.S.
- Died: January 16, 1935 (aged 60); Redlands, California, U.S.
- Education: Baltimore Medical College (Medical degree, 1898)
- Occupations: Physician, writer
- Spouse: Katie C. Trame (m. 1900)

George Stephen Weger (September 2, 1874 – January 16, 1935) was an American physician and natural hygiene proponent.

== Biography ==
Weger was born in Baltimore, Maryland. In 1895, he attended Baltimore Medical College and obtained his medical degree in 1898. From 1898, Weger worked as a physician in Delphos, Ohio. He was a devout Catholic. He married Katie C. Trame on October 1, 1900.

Weger practiced medicine in Delphos until 1912. He was general manager of Mueller Implement and Auto Company in Delphos. He was a member of the California State and San Bernardino County Medical Associations, Delphos Commercial Club and Vice President of the Society for the Prevention of Tuberculosis.

After 1912, Weger rejected conventional medicine and was associated with the natural hygiene movement. In his book Dietetic Disappointments and Failures, he recommended fasting, a fruit, vegetable and nut diet and for people to avoid drugs, flour, meat, salt, spices, alcohol, coffee, tea, all processed foods and sexual excitement. In 1920, the California State Journal of Medicine noted that "Weger, with an inchoate grouch against the medical profession, of which, we surmise, he is a misrepresentative member."

Weger was director and owner of Weger Health School in Redlands, California (1923–1935). He died at his school on January 16, 1935, from a heart attack. A chair was established at the Medical School of Columbia University in memory of Weger.

== Publications ==
- Health Lessons (1925)
- The Genesis and Control of Disease (1931)
- Dietetic Disappointments and Failures (1994 reprint)
