= Symon Gould =

American politician

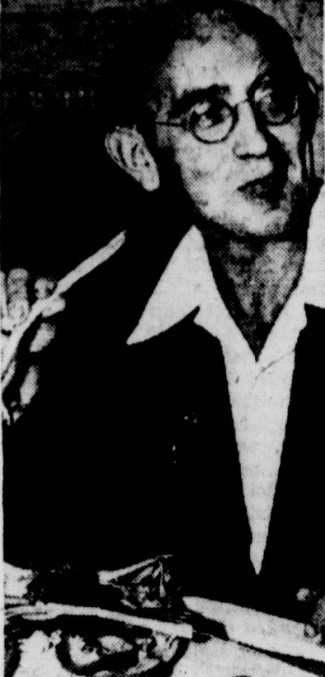
- Gould in 1943

Personal details
- Born: 1894
- Died: November 24, 1963 (aged 70) Roosevelt Hospital
- Party: American Vegetarian Party

Symon Gould (1894 – November 24, 1963) was an American politician and vegetarianism activist. He was the co-founder of the American Vegetarian Party, formed in 1948.

== Biography ==
Gould was a bibliophile, rare book dealer, and director of the American Library Service.

Gould was also the founder of the International Film Arts Guild, based in New York City. According to one account, he edited the American print of the silent film Nosferatu. Gould is credited with boosting the "art house theater" (or "little cinema") movement by his screenings at the Cameo Theatre in New York.

Gould died in of cancer at Roosevelt Hospital in 1963. He was 70 years old. Prior to his death, Gould resided on 150 West 47th Street in Midtown Manhattan.

== Vegetarianism ==
In 1948, Gould co-founded the American Vegetarian Party with John Maxwell, a naturopathic physician and restaurateur. Gould was editor of the American Vegetarian magazine. He was their candidate for President of the United States in the 1960 and 1964 presidential elections.

Gould was also secretary of the Vegetarian Society of New York and urged the government to take vegetarianism into account under any rationing plan during World War II. In 1946 in New York City, Gould moderated a debate sponsored by the League for Public Discussion on meat eating versus vegetarianism.

Gould was a lacto-vegetarian. He fasted for 21 days every year.

He was a promoter of Herbert M. Shelton's American Natural Hygiene Society.

Preceded by Herbert M. Shelton	American Vegetarian Party presidential candidate 1960 (lost), 1964 (lost)	Succeeded by —
Preceded by Daniel J. Murphy	American Vegetarian Party vice presidential candidate 1952 (lost), 1956 (lost)	Succeeded by Chistopher Gian-Cursio
