= Mary Gove Nichols =

American women's rights and health reform advocate

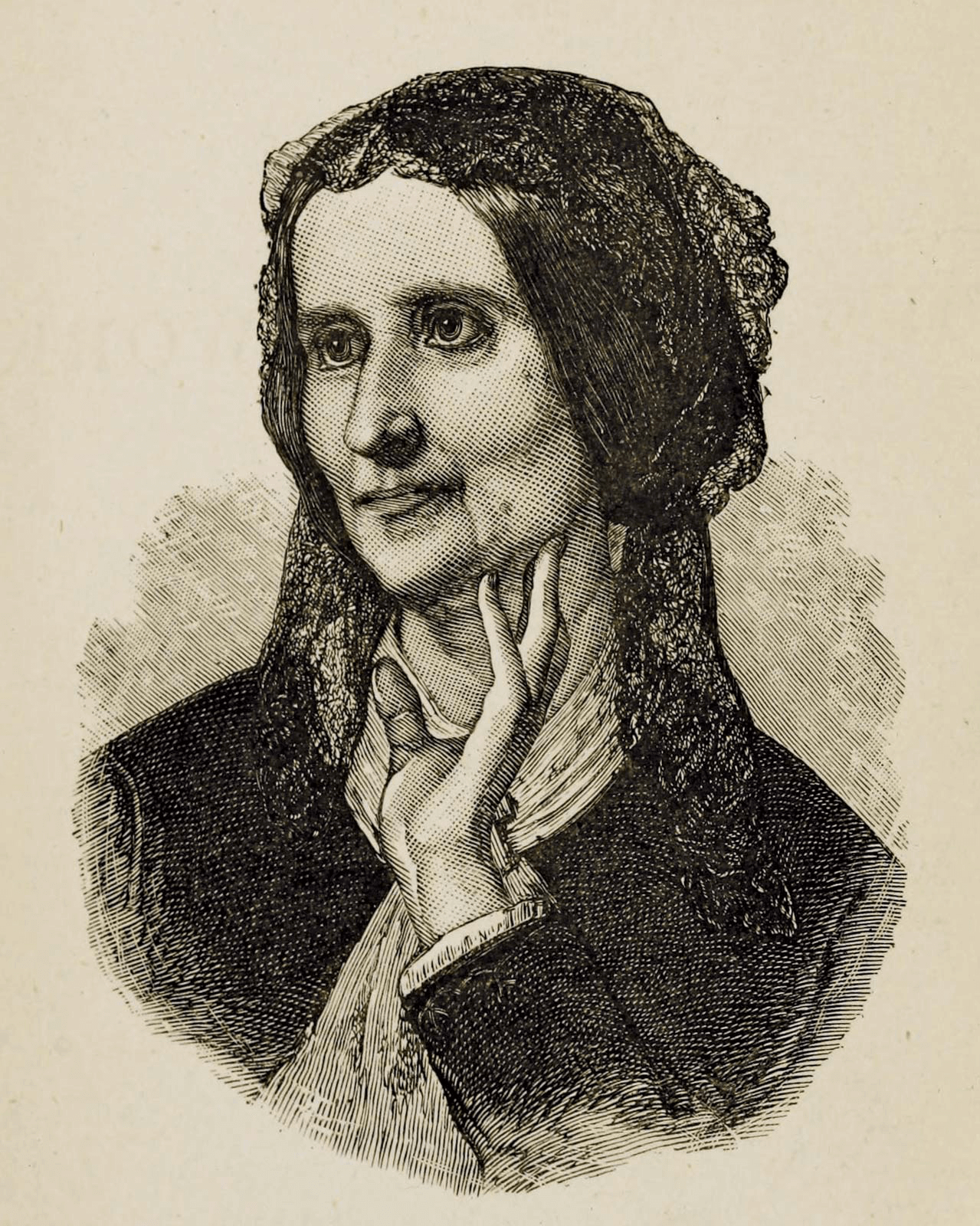
- Born: Mary Sargeant Neal; August 10, 1810; Goffstown, New Hampshire, United States
- Died: May 30, 1884 (aged 73); Brompton, London, England
- Other name: Mary Orme
- Occupations: Women's rights and health reform activist, writer
- Spouses: Hiram Gove (m. 1831; div. 1847) Thomas Low Nichols (m. 1848)
- Children: Elma Gove

Mary Sargeant Gove Nichols (née Neal; August 10, 1810 – May 30, 1884), also known by her pen name Mary Orme, was an American women's rights and health reform advocate, hydrotherapist, vegetarian socialist, and writer. Her later conversion to Catholicism caused her to abandon the free love movement and a fascination with séances, but she remained a health advocate and social progressive.

== Biography ==
=== Early life ===
Nichols was born in Goffstown, New Hampshire. Nichols and her first husband, Hiram Gove, moved to Lynn, Massachusetts, where Mary ran a girls' school, and this was where she began her health reform career.

After being abused, both sexually and emotionally, by her husband, Nichols made it her life's work to inform women of their bodies and their opportunities.

=== Career ===
Nichols studied the writings of Sylvester Graham and became a vegetarian around 1837. She was an influential proponent in the natural hygiene movement. She lectured to all-female audiences on anatomy, physiology, and hygiene to relieve women of what she saw as unnecessary physical and mental suffering. She recommended that women exercise daily, breathe fresh air, shower with cold water, avoid the fashionable tight-laced corsets of the day, and abstain from coffee and meat.

Nichols lectured for the Ladies Physiological Society, an offshoot of the American Physiological Society. She has been described as the "first woman in America to lecture on topics of anatomy and physiology and she included lessons on vegetarianism, and prevention and cure of sickness." Nichols believed that cancer could be cured with a vegetarian diet.

In July 1848, Nichols married T. L. Nichols, a writer who also had an interest in health reform and progressive views on women's rights. Together they planned to open a School of Health, School of Progress and School of Life in a three-story building they leased.

In 1851, Nichols and her husband founded a "water-cure" clinic, the American Hydropathic Institute in New York City. It offered a fee of $50, for people to become qualified "water cure" doctors. The institute's use of hydrotherapy is cited as a historical example of quackery. Nichols and her husband were advocates of bathing in cold water, fasting and occasional wet-sheet packing. Nichols contributed to the Water-Cure Journal, and published with her husband Nichols’ Journal of Health, Water-Cure, and Human Progress (1853–1858).

Nichols and her husband advocated free love and the belief that marriage was evil. She was the leading female advocate and the woman most looked up to in the free love movement, and her autobiography (Mary Lyndon: Or, Revelations of a Life: An Autobiography, 1860) became the first argument against marriage written from a woman's point of view. These beliefs alienated Nichols and her husband from others in the hydropathic community. In 1855, they moved to Cincinnati and opened the Memnonia Institute, a "school of life" at Yellow Springs, Ohio, in 1856. The name of the institute referred to the goddess of water, reflecting their interest in hydropathy, but also promoted asceticism, fasting, and spiritual penance. It had few members, lasting only one year.

Nichols also wrote novels and stories under the pseudonym Mary Orme. She wrote short stories for Godey's Lady's Book. Edgar Allan Poe praised her fiction. She and her husband were also socialists, being followers of Charles Fourier.

=== Conversion to Catholicism ===
Nichols and her husband both attended séances, at one point daily, believing themselves to be in communication with spirits. On one occasion in 1856, a séance resulted in Nichols and her husband experiencing visions of long-deceased Jesuit priests, including the Spanish saints Ignatius of Loyola and Francis Xavier. As a result, Nichols and her husband ceased their involvement in séances and the free love movement and converted to Catholicism, receiving instruction from the Jesuits of St. Xavier College and baptism at St. Francis Xavier Church in Cincinnati in 1857. Their conversion was seen as controversial among the Church hierarchy and the wider public.

=== Later life and death ===
Nichols and her husband moved to England at the outset of the Civil War. She died in Brompton, London, on May 30, 1884, from breast cancer.

== Personal life ==
Nichols first marriage was to Hiram Gove, an unsuccessful businessman, in 1831. Gove married Mary expecting financial support and obedience from his wife. She suffered four miscarriages and a chronic illness In 1841, after being abused by Gove, Nichols took her daughter and moved back with her parents, leaving her husband behind; he eventually agreed to a divorce in 1847 or 1848. Nichols' surviving daughter, Elma Gove, became a painter.

In July 1848, Nichols remarried to T. L. Nichols.

== Legacy ==
Herbert M. Shelton's book The Science and Fine Art of Natural Hygiene is dedicated to Gove and other natural hygienists.

== Selected publications ==
- Experience in Water-Cure (1849)
- Marriage: Its History, Character, and Results [with Thomas Low Nicholas, 1854]
- Mary Lyndon: Or, Revelations of a Life: An Autobiography (1860)
- A Woman's Work in Water Cure and Sanitary Education (1874)
