= Kesley, Iowa =

- Unincorporated community
- Location within the state of Iowa Kesley, Iowa (the United States)
- Coordinates: 42°39′45″N 92°54′37″W
- Country: United States
- State: Iowa
- County: Butler
- Elevation: 1,004 ft (306 m)
- Time zone: UTC-6 (Central (CST))
  - Summer (DST): UTC-5 (CDT)
- ZIP codes: 50649
- GNIS feature ID: 458060

Kesley is an unincorporated community in southwestern Butler County, Iowa, United States. It lies along local roads southwest of the city of Allison, the county seat of Butler County. Although Kesley is unincorporated, it has a post office with the ZIP code of 50649.

== History ==
A post office has been in operation in Kesley since 1900. The community was named for Kesley Green, a local farmer.

Kesley's population in 1915 was 52. The population was 127 in 1940.
