= Jesse Mercer Gehman =

American naturopath

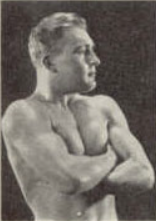
- Born: January 17, 1901
- Died: 1976 (aged 74–75)
- Occupations: Naturopath, writer

Jesse Mercer Gehman (January 17, 1901 – 1976) was an American naturopath, vegetarianism activist and amateur wrestler associated with the natural hygiene and physical culture movement.

== Biography ==
Gehman graduated from the American College of Naturopathy and Chiropractic in 1925. He obtained a doctorate in natural philosophy in 1931. He was a vegetarian and wrote articles for the American Vegetarian-Hygienist and the Health and Strength magazine.

Gehman was Chairman of the First American Vegetarian Convention held at Lake Geneva, Wisconsin in 1949. He was Vice-President of the International Vegetarian Union (1960–1977), he was also President of the American Naturopathic Association. Gehman was Benedict Lust's successor. He wrote an authorized biography of Lust, but the work was never published. Gehman worked as an associate editor for Bernarr Macfadden's Physical Culture magazine. He founded his own naturopathic resort near Harrisburg, Pennsylvania. Gehman was a founding member of the American Natural Hygiene Society.

Gehman was an anti-vaccinationist. He commented that naturopaths do not believe in "vaccination, inoculation, contagion, infection or drugs of any kind." His best known work Smoke Over America, examined the dangers of tobacco smoke. It was negatively reviewed in The Sanitarian journal as "poorly organized, unscientific, over-written." He was secretary of the Citizens Medical Reference Bureau from the 1930s–1950s, which had connections to the Anti-Vaccination League of America. He recommended clean living, exercise, fasting and a vegetarian diet to treat cancer, he commented that "the cure of cancer is in simple natural physical culture living".

Gehman was an amateur wrestler, under the name Jim Mercer. His brother was "Atomic" Marvin Mercer, a heavyweight wrestling champion.

== Publications ==
- Smoke Over America (1943)
- A Commemorative and Descriptive Book on the Light of Naturopathy (1947)
- Living Today for Tomorrow (1947)
- Is Smoking Harmful? (1950)
- Why?: Use Suncooked Juice Foods Daily (1959)

== See also ==
- H.J. Lutcher Stark Center for Physical Culture and Sports
- Orthopathy
