= New York Hydropathic and Physiological School =

Medical school in New York City, US

Coordinates: 40.7217°N 74.0054°W

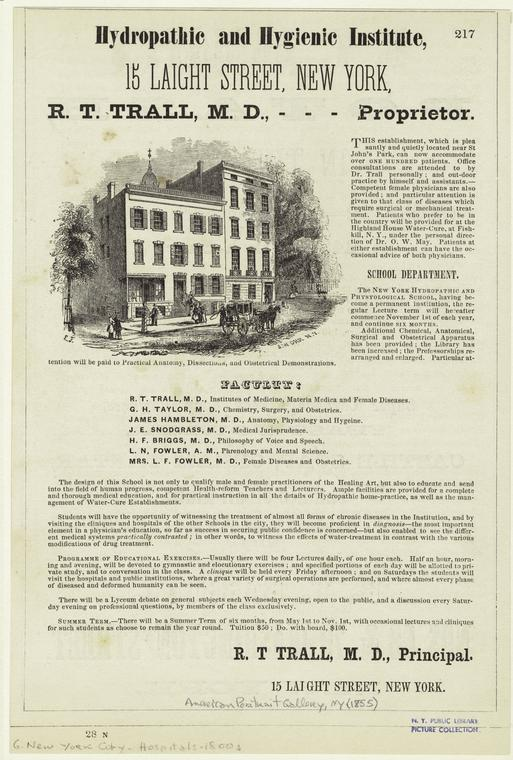
New York Hydropathic and Physiological School

The New York Hydropathic and Physiological School founded by Russell Thacher Trall on October 1, 1853, at 15 Laight Street, in New York City was a hydropathic and medical school known for its advocacy of natural therapies and vegetarianism.

== History ==
The New York Hydropathic and Physiological School is chiefly notable today as one of the first medical schools in the United States to admit women candidates for the Doctor of Medicine degree. New England Female Medical College in Boston was the first, opening its doors in 1848. In 1855 the school graduated 50 physicians, "...about half of which were women." By an act of the New York State Legislature in 1857 the school's name was changed to New York Hygeio-Therapeutic College and the school was authorized to confer the degree of Doctor of Medicine. In 1858, the school graduated another 60 physicians, and again the number of female graduates was about half that number.

The school emphasized hydropathy, also known as the "water cure," vegetarian dietary therapies, sanitation, hygiene, exercise, and abandoning most of the materia medica used by allopathic physicians. Founder Russell T. Trall was one of the first medical advocates of vegan nutrition The school moved to Florence, New Jersey by 1869 and continued in operation until 1875 when it was offered for sale. Trall died in 1877 and is buried in Florence, New Jersey.

== The Hygienic Institute ==
At the same address on Laight Street, Trall also operated The Hygienic Institute. In the 1860s E. P. Miller was its proprietor and resident physician, whilst Trall remained consulting physician. Its female physician was Ellen Goodell Smith. In 1864, it was reported that the institute had treated more than 10,000 patients.
