= Sylvester Graham =

American Presbyterian minister and dietary reformer (1794–1851)

The Reverend Sylvester Graham
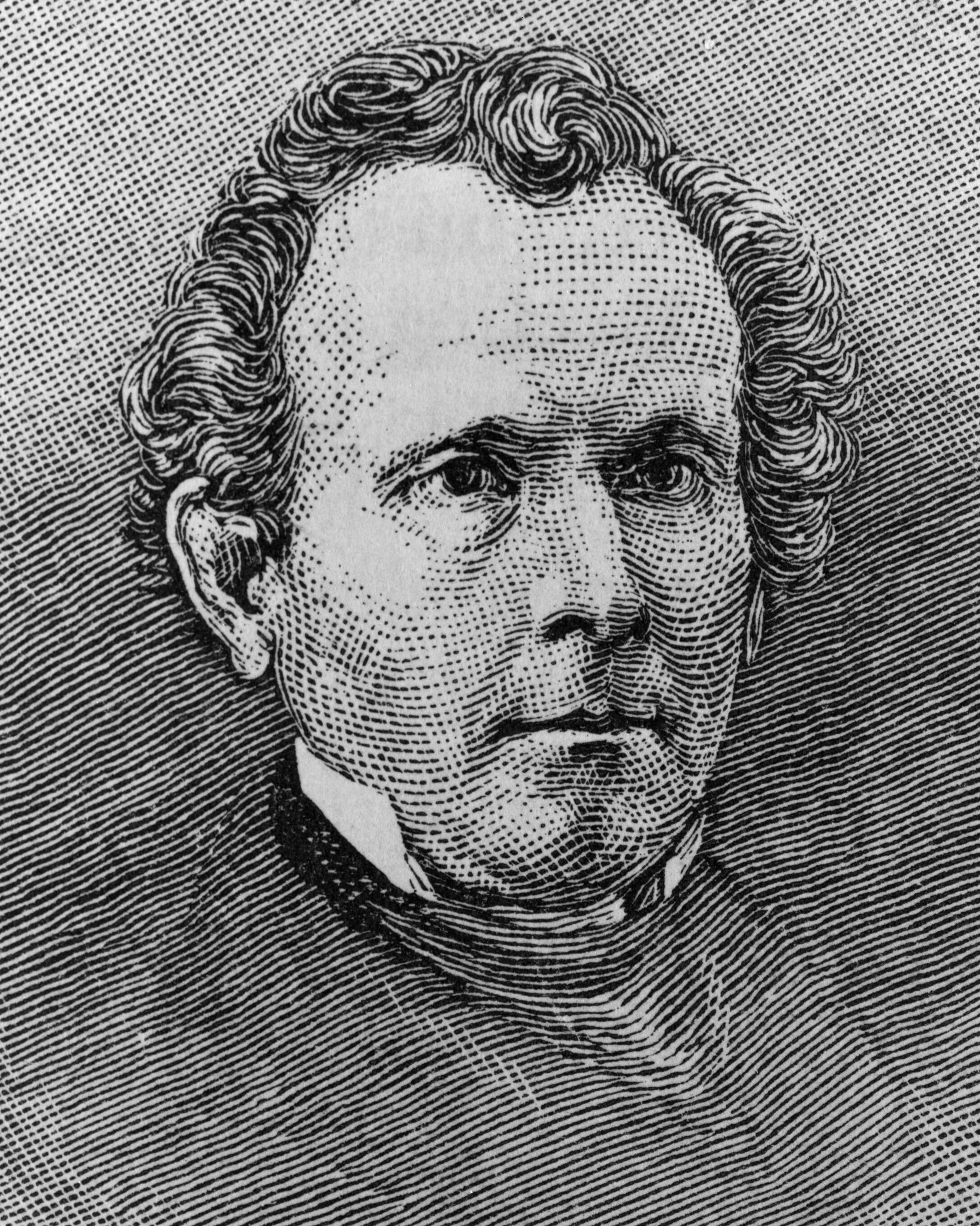
- Wood engraving of Graham, 1880
- Born: July 5, 1794; Suffield, Connecticut, U.S.
- Died: September 11, 1851 (aged 57); Northampton, Massachusetts, U.S.
- Education: Amherst Academy
- Occupations: Presbyterian minister, dietary reformer
- Spouse: Sarah Manchester Earl (m. 1824)
- Children: 3

Sylvester Graham (July 5, 1794 – September 11, 1851) was an American Presbyterian minister and dietary reformer. He was known for his emphasis on vegetarianism, the temperance movement, and eating whole-grain bread. His preaching inspired the graham flour, graham bread, and graham cracker products. Graham is often referred to as the "Father of Vegetarianism" in the United States of America. Graham's lectures caused riots on multiple occasions.

== Early life ==
Graham was born July 5, 1794 in Suffield, Connecticut, into a family of 17 children. His father, who was 72 years old at the time of Graham's birth, died when Graham was two years old. His mother was reported to have had mental health issues. During his childhood, Graham lived with various relatives. At one point, he was placed with a relative who operated a tavern, where he worked. Witnessing alcohol abuse during this time reportedly influenced his lifelong opposition to drinking, which was uncommon among his peers.

Graham was frequently in poor health and missed much of his formal education. Before pursuing the ministry, he worked in various occupations, including as a farmhand, cleaner, and teacher. He enrolled at Amherst Academy in his late twenties with the intention of becoming a minister, following the example of his father and grandfather. He withdrew after a year, reportedly due to unfavorable reactions from fellow students to his dramatic speaking style.

Following his departure from school, Graham experienced a period of social isolation and reportedly suffered a nervous breakdown. He relocated to Little Compton, Rhode Island, to recover. While there, he was cared for by a local woman, Sarah Manchester Earl. The two developed a relationship and were married on September 19, 1824. They had three children together: Sarah, Henry, and Caroline.

Graham continued his theological studies independently and, in 1828, began working as an itinerant preacher at the Bound Brook Presbyterian Church in Bound Brook, New Jersey.

== Career ==
In 1830, Graham accepted a position at the Philadelphia Temperance Society. He left six months later to focus on preaching health.

Graham's appointment and conversion to vegetarianism came as the 1826–1837 cholera pandemic was breaking in Europe, and Americans were terrified that it would reach the United States. Accepted medical opinion was that the best way to prevent contracting cholera was to eat plenty of meat, drink port wine, and avoid vegetables. Cholera was widely believed at the time to be a plague or a form of divine punishment.

Unlike most temperance societies of the period, which were typically led by clergy, the Philadelphia Temperance Society was headed by physicians who focused on the health effects of alcohol consumption. While involved with the group, Graham may have encountered two other prominent figures in early American vegetarianism: William Metcalfe, an English minister who founded a vegetarian church in Philadelphia, and William A. Alcott, a Philadelphia physician who wrote extensively on vegetarianism and authored the first American vegetarian cookbook. Graham was largely self-taught in physiology and developed the belief that meat, like alcohol, encouraged gluttony. He argued that both substances degraded the body and soul, with negative consequences for individuals, families, and society.

Graham's views were influenced by Treatise on Physiology by François-Joseph-Victor Broussais, published in Philadelphia in 1826, which argued that diet had a significant impact on health. He was also influenced by the works of German chemist Friedrich Accum, particularly Treatise on Adulteration of Foods and Culinary Poisons, which condemned the use of chemical additives in food—especially bread—and Treatise on the Art of Making Good and Wholesome Bread. At the time, wheat flour was often adulterated with substances such as alum, chalk, and plaster of Paris to increase volume, improve whiteness, or mask spoilage. Bread was typically made from finely ground white flour, which Graham criticized as "tortured", and leavened with brewer's yeast, also associated with beer production.

Like many in the temperance movement, Graham regarded physical pleasures, particularly sexual stimulation, with suspicion, viewing them as sources of lust that could lead to personal and societal harm. His thinking was shaped by the Bible and Christian theology, though interpreted in a distinctive manner. He believed that humans were intended to follow a plant diet, as exemplified by Adam and Eve in the Garden of Eden, and that disease and plague were consequences of violating natural law. Graham advocated for emotional restraint and argued that individuals should avoid anxiety and lust in order to maintain health, making him an early proponent of the idea that stress could contribute to illness.

Building on these beliefs, Graham developed a dietary and lifestyle regimen intended to promote purity and health at the individual, familial, and societal levels. This included drinking pure water, following a vegetarian diet centered on bread made at home from coarsely ground flour, and avoiding spices and other "stimulants". He also advocated for strict lifestyle practices such as sleeping on hard beds and avoiding warm baths. His approach has been described as an early form of preventive medicine. Graham's emphasis on home milling and baking reflected his broader vision of domestic life in America, in which women played a central role in sustaining the health of their families, as his wife had done for him.

Graham believed that following his prescribed diet would help prevent impure thoughts and, by extension, reduce masturbation, which he considered a cause of blindness and premature death. His 1834 publication On Self-Pollution contributed to the widespread anxiety about masturbation in antebellum America. He argued that masturbation was particularly harmful to children, given the perceived immaturity of their reproductive organs.

As a skilled and impassioned speaker, Graham drew public attention with a message that blended patriotism, theology, diet, lifestyle reform, and elements of the temperance movement. His views provoked strong reactions, attracting a following among concerned members of the public while angering bakers, butchers, and members of the medical establishment. During the 1832 cholera epidemic in New York, individuals who followed Graham’s regimen were reported to fare better, contributing to a surge in his popularity.

In 1837, he published Treatise on Bread and Bread-Making, which included a history of bread and instructions for preparing what became known as Graham bread. The book was reprinted in 2012 by Andrews McMeel Publishing as part of the American Antiquarian Cookbook Collection.

=== Grahamism ===
As Graham's influence grew, "Grahamism" developed into a broader movement. Followers—called "Grahamites"—and entrepreneurs began producing and marketing items such as Graham flour, Graham bread, and graham crackers, inspired by his teachings. His ideas influenced several prominent Americans, including journalist Horace Greeley and John Harvey Kellogg, the founder of the Battle Creek Sanitarium.

Grahamite boarding houses were established in the 1830s to promote and practice the lifestyle principles advocated by Graham. Residents adhered to a regimen that emphasized dietetic and hygienic reform, including cold baths, sleeping on hard mattresses, maintaining ventilation with open windows, a vegetarian diet featuring Graham bread, and drinking cold water. While the consumption of animal flesh was prohibited, eggs were permitted at breakfast and constituted an important part of the Grahamite diet.

=== American Physiological Society ===
In 1837, Colonel John Benson, Graham, and William Alcott founded the American Physiological Society (APS) in Boston to promote Grahamism. Alcott was first President of the Society. After a year, the Society was reported to have had 251 members, including 93 women. It lasted just three years.

Laura J. Miller commented that the Society was "the most visible association promoting natural foods principles until the American Vegetarian Society was founded in 1850". Many of the APS members suffered from chronic disease and became vegetarian. It has been described as "likely the first exclusively vegetarian organization in the United States". It was also the first American natural hygiene organization. A notable member of the APS was Mary Gove Nichols, who gave health lectures to women.

In 1837, Graham and David Cambell founded The Graham Journal of Health and Longevity. It was "designed to illustrate by facts, and sustain by reason and principles the science of human life as taught by Sylvester Graham". It was edited by Campbell, Secretary of the APR (1837–1839), and five volumes were published. In 1840, the journal merged with the Library of Health, edited by Alcott.

=== American Vegetarian Society ===
In 1850, Alcott, William Metcalfe, Russell Trall, and Graham founded the American Vegetarian Society in New York City, modeled on a similar organization established in Great Britain in 1847.

== Graham Riots ==
Sylvester Graham's lectures caused riots on multiple occasions by men opposed to his moral reform ideas. In 1837, his lectures in New York and Boston drew large crowds, but the lectures drew critics. Scholars point to the Lecture to Mothers as the cause of the riots. Graham only delivered the lecture three times and a riot was caused all three times.

In 1833, Graham's lectures in Providence, Rhode Island were disrupted by a riot. In June 1834, a riot took place at the Temple Street Church in Portland, Maine, where Graham was speaking because he tied vegetarianism to social justice. On June 27, 1834 at Portland City Hall an Anti-Graham Lecture was held. The riot happened when Graham delivered his Lecture to Mothers about sexual physiology that treated men and women as equals. Rioters threw rocks through the church windows. Newspaper editors in 1834 blamed the riot on Graham's vegetarianism.

In 1837, Graham's Boston lectures were disrupted by riots from local butchers and commercial bakers. Standing on the roof of the hotel where he was speaking, his supporters shoveled lime on the rioters.

== Death ==
Graham died of complications after receiving opium enemas, as directed by his doctor, at the age of 57 at home in Northampton, Massachusetts. His early death was the source of criticism and speculation. Historian Stephen Nissenbaum has written that Graham died "after violating his own strictures by taking liquor and meat in a last desperate attempt to recover his health".

Russell Trall, who had visited Graham, noted that he had strayed from a strict vegetarian diet and was prescribed meat by his doctor to increase his blood circulation. Trall wrote that before his death Graham regretted this decision and "fully and verily believed in the theory of vegetable diet as explained in his works".

After his death, vegetarians distanced themselves from Grahamism. However, his vegetarian message was disseminated far into the 20th century.

Food historians cite Graham as one of the earliest food faddists in America.

== Selected works ==
Of his numerous publications, the best known are:

- Treatise on Bread and Bread-Making (1837, and reissued in 2012 by Andrews McMeel Publishing)
- Lectures on the Science of Human Life (Boston, 1839), of which several editions of the two-volume work were printed in the United States and sales in England were widespread
- Lectures to Young Men on Chastity.
- A lecture on epidemic diseases generally: and particularly the spasmodic cholera (1833)
- A lecture to young men on chastity: intended also for the serious consideration of parents and guardians (1837)

== See also ==
- James Caleb Jackson, the farmer, journalist, abolitionist, and doctor who invented the first manufactured breakfast cereal
- Isaac Jennings, physician who pioneered orthopathy
- Maximilian Bircher-Benner, the Swiss doctor who developed muesli
- Popular Health Movement
- Roman Meal, the later whole grain American bread company
