= Herbert M. Shelton =

American naturopath

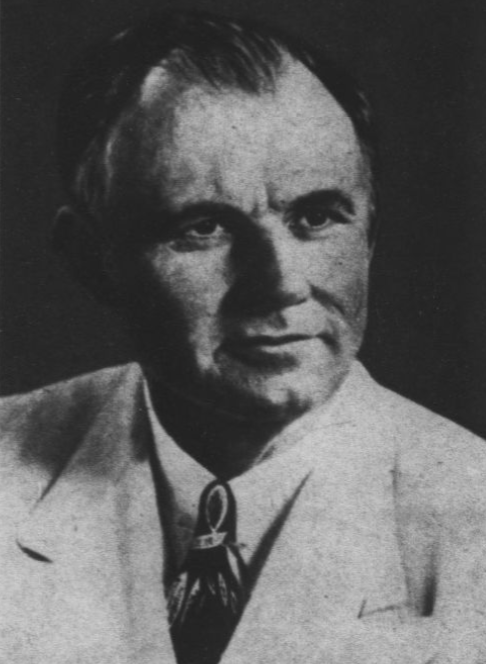
- Born: Herbert McGolfin Shelton; October 6, 1895; Wylie, Texas, U.S.
- Died: January 1, 1985 (aged 89)
- Known for: Alternative medicine, vegetarianism, Raw foodism, pacifism

Herbert McGolfin Shelton (October 6, 1895 – January 1, 1985) was an American naturopath, alternative medicine advocate, author, pacifist, vegan, and a supporter of rawism and fasting. Shelton was nominated by the American Vegetarian Party to run as its candidate for President of the United States in 1956. He saw himself as the champion of original natural hygiene ideas from the 1830s. His ideas have been described as quackery by critics.

== Early life ==
Shelton was born on October 6, 1895, in Wylie, Texas, to Thomas Mitchell Shelton and Mary Frances Gutherie Shelton, who were devoted Christians. As a child, Shelton took an interest in animals, especially their habits when sick as compared to when well. He was especially intrigued by their fasting when the farm animals became sick.

== Career ==
Shelton attended Bernarr Macfadden's College of Physcultopathy in Chicago and interned at Crane's Sanatorium in Elmhurst, Illinois. He also attended Lindlahr College of Natural Therapeutics for post-graduate work and served at Lindlahr's and Sahler's Sanatoriums. Shelton later continued post-graduate work at Peerless College of Chiropractic in Illinois and served an internship at Crandall Health School in Pennsylvania.

In 1921, he married Ida Pape, studied at the American School of Chiropractic, and graduated from the American School of Naturopathy with a Doctor of Naturopathic Medicine. Shelton claimed that cooking food denatures it, and that a healthy body has the ability to restore itself from illness without medical intervention. Although heavily criticized by his contemporaries for advocating fasting over medical treatment, Shelton's work served as an early influence for the raw food movement.

In 1922, Shelton self-published his first book, Fundamentals of Nature Cure. Seeing importance in the Hygienic Movement (influenced by Isaac Jennings and Sylvester Graham), he changed the title of this first book to An Introduction to Natural Hygiene. From 1934 to 1941, Shelton authored a seven-volume work The Hygienic System.

In 1939, Shelton published The Hygienic Review magazine which ran for four decades. In 1948, he founded the American Natural Hygiene Society which was renamed the National Health Association in 1998.

== Legal history ==
A pacifist, Shelton was jailed in 1917 for making an anti-draft statement in public during the height of World War I.

In 1927, Shelton was arrested, jailed, and fined three times for practicing medicine without a license. These arrests continued periodically through the next three decades. He was found guilty of violating the Medical Practice Act in 1932, and served 30 days on Rikers Island.

In 1942, Shelton was charged with negligent homicide and "treating and offering to treat a human being without a state medical license" for starving a patient to death. The case was never tried and the charges were later dropped.

In 1978, another patient died at one of his schools, this time of an apparent heart attack. After a two-year-long court battle, Shelton lost the lawsuit for negligence and was bankrupted by the judgment. His school was forced to close as a result.

== Death ==
By 1972, at the age of 77, Shelton became bedridden from a degenerative neuromuscular disease, believed to be Parkinson's disease. He died thirteen years later, unable to improve his own health despite many attempts. His peers were shocked to see him unable to walk, speak normally, or write.

Towards the end of his life, Shelton continued his involvement in Dr. Shelton's Health School. The school operated for 53 years, closing in 1981.

In 1989, four years after his death, a biography of Shelton called Yours for Health: The Life and Times of Herbert M. Shelton, was published by Jean A. Oswald.

== Bibliography ==
- Shelton, Herbert M. A Month of Menus: Featuring Natural Non-animal Foods, Deliciously And Healthfully Selected in Compatible Combinations, With A Minimum of Preparation. The American Vegan Society. (1968).
- Shelton, Herbert M. An Introduction to Natural Hygiene. (1972).
- Shelton, Herbert M. Animal Foods. The American Vegan Society. (1968).
- Shelton, Herbert M. Basic Principles of Natural Hygiene. (1949).
- Shelton, Herbert M. Colds (Acute Coryza) and Related Subjects. (1958).
- Shelton, Herbert M. Facts About Fasting. The American Vegan Society. (1968).
- Shelton, Herbert M. (1964). Fasting Can Save Your Life. Chicago, Illinois: Natural Hygiene Press. ISBN 0-914532-00-6. LCCN 75-43453.
- Shelton, Herbert M, Cridland, Ronald G, MD. Fasting Can Save Your Life. (1978).
- Shelton, Herbert M. Fasting for Renewal of Life. (1995).
- Shelton, Herbert M. Food and Feeding. Kessinger Publishing Company ISBN 0-7661-4590-5 (Jan. 2003).
- Shelton, Herbert M. et al., Getting Well. Health Research. UPC/ ISBN 0-7873-0778-5 (June 1993).
- Shelton, Herbert M. Health for All. (1930).
- Shelton, Herbert M. Health for the Millions. (1968).
- Shelton, Herbert M. History of Natural Hygiene and Principles of Natural Hygien: Teachings of Doctors Jennings, Graham, Trall and Tilden. (Jan. 1996).
- Shelton, Herbert M. How to Get Well And Stay Well. (1978).
- Shelton, Herbert M. Human Beauty: Its Culture and Hygiene. (1958).
- Shelton, Herbert M. Human Life: Its Philosophy and Laws: An Exposition of the Principles and Practices of Orthopathy. ISBN 1564597148
- Shelton, Herbert M. Hygienic Review. (Sep 1996).
- Shelton, Herbert M. The Hygienic System, Vol. I: Orthobionomics. (Sep. 1934).
- Shelton, Herbert M. (1935). The Hygienic System, Vol. II: Orthotrophy. San Antonio, Texas: Dr. Shelton's Health School. OCLC 32372334. Also available from SoilandHealth.org.
- Shelton, Herbert M. (1934). The Hygienic System, Vol. III: Fasting and Sun Bathing for Healing Disease. Chicago, Illinois: Natural Hygiene Press. OCLC 8413951. Archived from the original on February 22, 2011.
- Shelton, Herbert M. Hygienic System, Vol. IV: Orthokinesiology. (1935).
- Shelton, Herbert M. Hygienic System, Vol. V: Orthogenetics. (1937).
- Shelton, Herbert M. (1939). The Hygienic System: Vol VI: Orthopathy. San Antonio, Texas: Dr. Shelton's Health School.
- Shelton, Herbert M. Hygienic System, Vol. VII: Orthopathy. (1937).
- Shelton, Herbert M. (1951). Food Combining Made Easy. San Antonio, Texas: Dr. Shelton's Health School. ISBN 978-1-61427-453-7..
- Shelton, Herbert M. The Joys of Getting Well. (1957).
- Shelton, Herbert M. The Liver and Its Complaints. (Sep. 1996).
- Shelton, Herbert M. Living Life to Live It Longer.
- Shelton, Herbert M. Natural Hygiene: Man's Pristine Way of Life. Library of New Atlantis, Incorporated UPC/ ISBN 1-57179-407-7 (Feb. 2003).
- Shelton, Herbert M. Natural Hygiene: The Pristine Way of Life (1968).
- Shelton, Herbert M. / Willard, Jo / Oswald, Jean A. The Original Natural Hygiene Weight Loss Diet Book. (New Canaan, CT: Keats Publishing, Inc, 1986). ISBN 0-87983-376-9
- Shelton, Herbert M. Rubies in the Sand. (1961).
- Shelton, Herbert M. The Science and Fine Art of Fasting.
- Shelton, Herbert M. The Science and Fine Art of Natural Hygiene. American Natural Hygiene Society. (1994).
- Shelton, Herbert M. Science and Fine Art of Food and Nutrition. American Natural Hygiene Society. (1996).
- Shelton, Herbert M. Superior Nutrition. Willow Pub. (1994).
- Shelton, Herbert M. Syphilis: The Werewolf of Medicine.
- Shelton, Herbert M. Vaccine and Serum Evils. (Sep. 1996).
- Shelton, Herbert M. et al. The Virgin Birth: The Famous Debate Between Herbert M. Shelton and George R. Clements. Health Research. ISBN 0-7873-1173-1 (Jan. 1998).
