= Orthopathy =

System of alternative medicine

Orthopathy (from the Greek ὀρθός orthos 'right' and πάθος pathos 'suffering') or natural hygiene (NH) is a set of alternative medical beliefs and practices originating from the Nature Cure movement. Proponents claim that fasting, dieting, and other lifestyle measures are all that is necessary to prevent and treat disease.

Natural hygiene is an offshoot of naturopathy that advocates a philosophy of 'natural living' that was developed in the early nineteenth century. Natural hygienists oppose drugs, fluoridation, immunization, most medical treatments and endorse fasting, food combining and raw food or vegetarian diets.

== History and practice ==
=== 19th century ===
The orthopathy movement originated with Isaac Jennings in the 1820s, who practiced conventional medicine for many years but became discouraged with its results. Jennings' system was firmly opposed to all medicine and was known as the 'no-medicine plan'. He prescribed bathing, rest and a vegetarian diet as part of his system.

In 1837, Colonel John Benson, Sylvester Graham and William Alcott founded the American Physiological Society (APS) in Boston to promote Grahamism, which lasted just three years. The APS was the first natural hygiene organization in the United States. Mary Gove Nichols lectured for the Ladies Physiological Society, an off-shoot of the APS. In the 1840s, Joel Shew was influenced by the dieting ideas of Sylvester Graham and promoted natural hygiene practices such as bathing, exercise and massage as well as the elimination of alcohol and tobacco.

Isaac Jennings in his 1867 book The Tree of Life, defined orthopathy as 'from orthos, right, true, erect; and pathos, affection. Nature is always upright—moving in the right direction'. George H. Taylor who introduced Swedish massage to the United States in the 1860s was known to promote natural hygiene and physical culture. Taylor believed that correct breathing and diet, gymnastics and mechanical massage could replace medical intervention and restore health.

Natural hygiene was often associated with vegetarianism during the nineteenth century. However, not all natural hygienists are vegetarians. Russell T. Trall was a notable early proponent of natural hygiene and vegetarianism. Trall established his own version called 'hygeiotherapy', a mixture of hydrotherapy with diet and exercise treatment regimes.

In 1887, Susanna Way Dodds and her sister Mary established the Hygienic College of Physicians and Surgeons in St. Louis, Missouri. They focused on 'natural methods of treatment: diet, exercise, massage, electricity and hydrotherapy in all of its manifold applications'.

During the 1880s, Thomas Allinson developed his theory of medicine, which he called 'Hygienic Medicine'.

=== 20th century ===
Natural hygienist George S. Weger managed Weger Health School in Redlands, California (1923–1935).

Herbert M. Shelton who has been described as 'the twentieth century's premier natural hygienist', was influenced by Sylvester Graham and Russell T. Trall. Shelton wrote much on the topic, beginning with The Hygienic System: Orthopathy in 1939, which renamed orthopathy as 'Natural Hygiene'.

Consumption of 'incompatible' foods in one meal is said to lead to ill health, and consumption of 'compatible' foods is said to maintain it: Shelton defined food combining and seven groups of food, sorted by function as: supplying energy (carbohydrates, fats, and proteins) needed to build the body (proteins, salts, and water) and regulating bodily processes (minerals, vitamins, and water).

White supremacist Ben Klassen was influenced by Shelton and natural hygienic principles and promoted his own 'racial health' regimen known as Salubrious Living. However, Klassen emphasised there were differences between his doctrine and the natural hygiene movement as the latter did not focus on perpetuating the white race like his regimen did. Klassen co-authored the book Salubrious Living with Arnold DeVries in 1982.

Interest in natural hygiene was renewed in the 1980s following publication of Fit for Life and Living Health by Harvey and Marilyn Diamond.

=== Organizations ===
In 1948, the American Natural Hygiene Society (ANHS) was founded by Herbert Shelton, William Esser, Gerald Benesh, Christopher Gian-Cursio, Jesse Mercer Gehman, Irving Davidson, Jack Dunn Trop and Symon Gould. In 1998, the ANHS became the National Health Association.

In 1956, Keki Sidhwa established the British Natural Hygiene Society (BNHS). The International Association of Hygienic Physicians was founded in 1978.

== Criticism ==
Medical experts consider natural hygiene practices such as anti-vaccination, fasting and food combining to be quackery. There is no scientific evidence that prolonged fasting provides any significant health benefits. A prolonged fast may cause "anemia, impairment of liver function, kidney stones, postural hypotension, mineral imbalances, and other undesirable side effects".

Claims from natural hygienists about fasting curing cancer are not supported by scientific evidence. According to the American Cancer Society, "available scientific evidence does not support claims that fasting is effective for preventing or treating cancer in humans".

== Founders ==
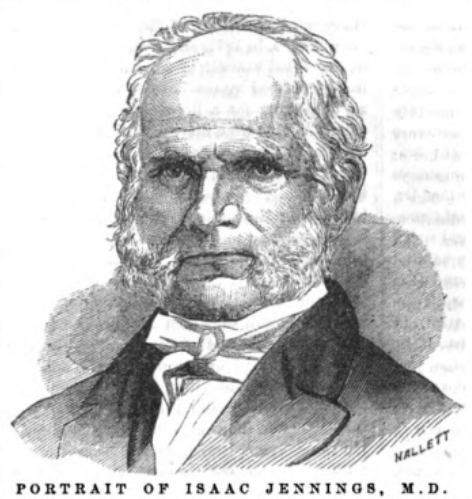
Isaac Jennings

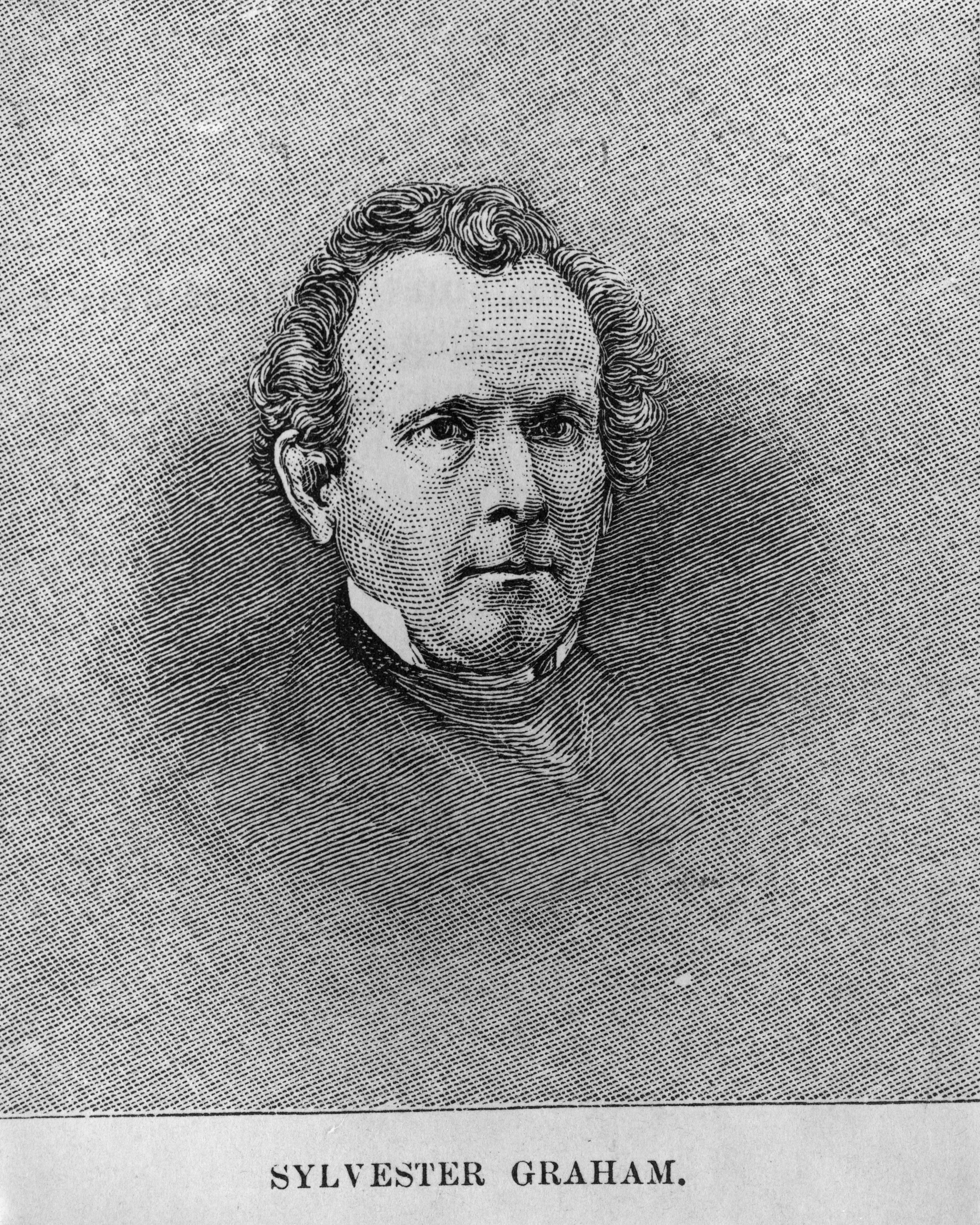
Sylvester Graham

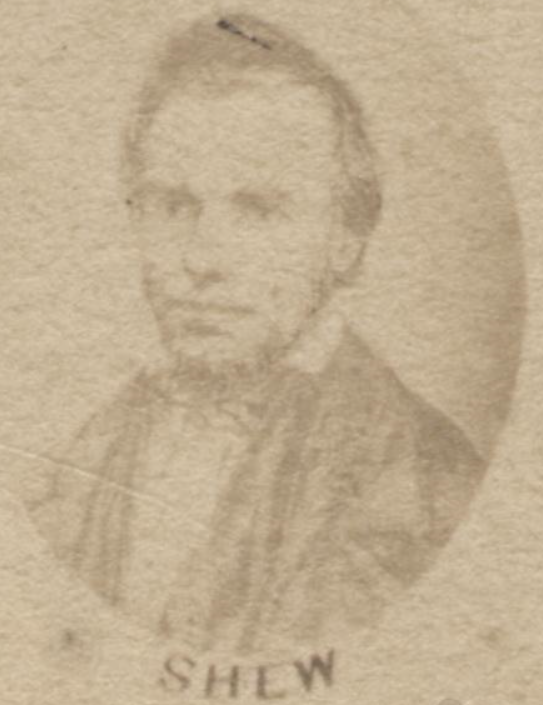
Joel Shew

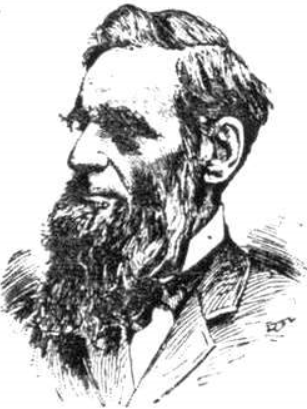
George H. Taylor

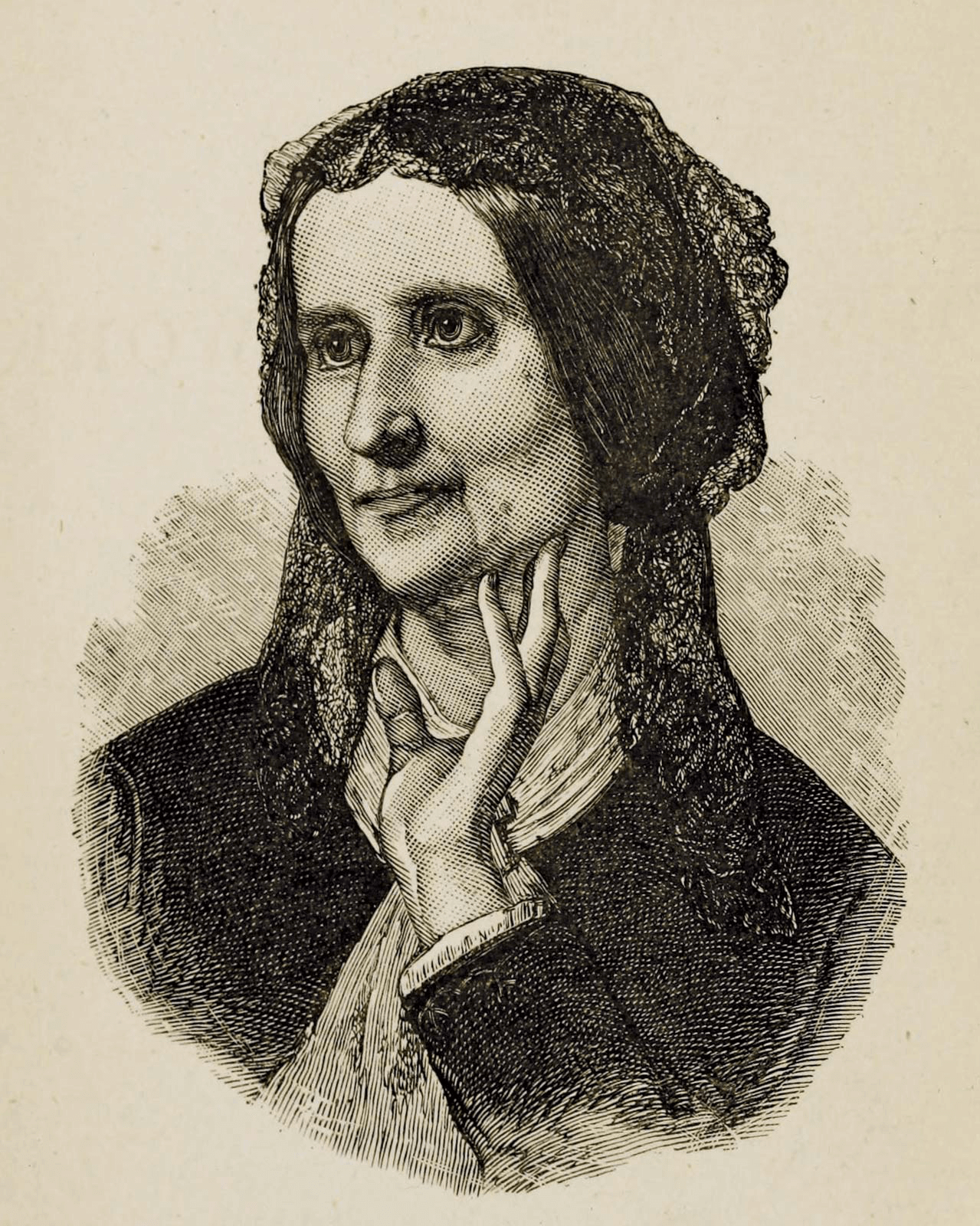
Mary Gove Nichols

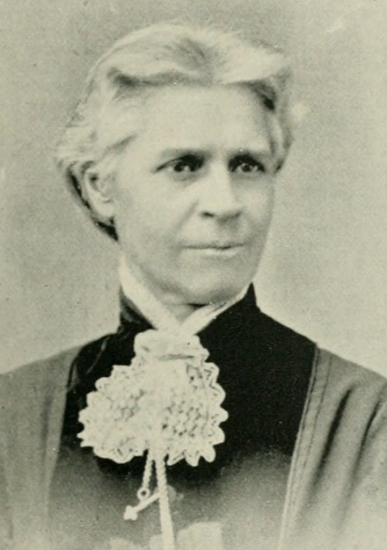
Susanna Way Dodds

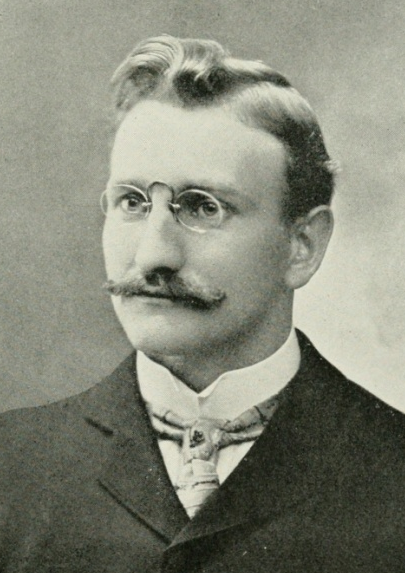
George S. Weger

== See also ==
- List of orthopaths
