= Russell Thacher Trall =

American physician (1812–1877)

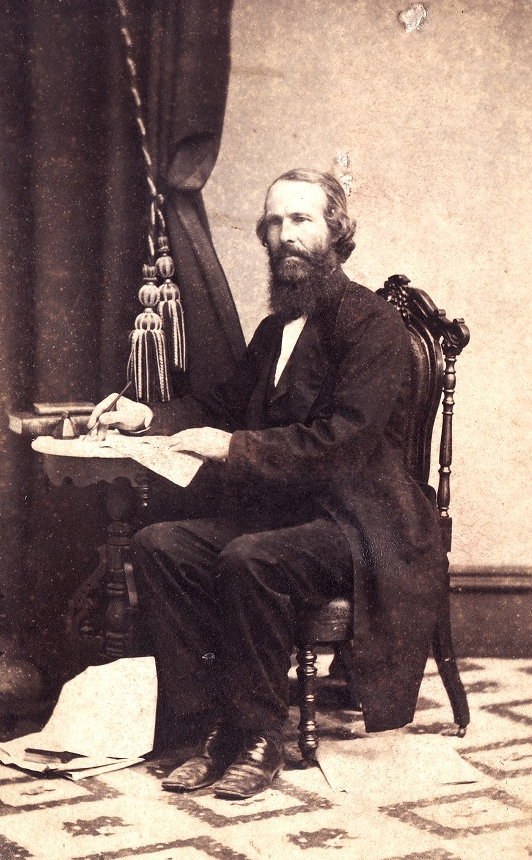
- Born: August 5, 1812; Vernon, Connecticut, U.S.
- Died: September 23, 1877 (aged 65); Florence, New Jersey, U.S.
- Occupations: Hydropathic physician, writer

Russell Thacher Trall (August 5, 1812 – September 23, 1877) was an American physician and proponent of hydrotherapy, natural hygiene and vegetarianism. He authored the first American vegan cookbook in 1874.

== Biography ==
Trall was born in Vernon, Connecticut. He trained in medicine and obtained his M.D. in 1835 from Albany Medical College but broke away from conventional medical methods. Trall practiced alternative medicine in New York City from 1840. He was influenced by the water cure movement and established his own water-cure institution in New York in 1844. In 1849, Trall founded the American Hydropathic Society with Joel Shew and Samuel R. Wells. Trall and Wells also established the American Anti-Tobacco Society in 1849. In 1850, he organized a convention for the American Hydropathic Society in New York City and during this year the Society became the American Hygienic and Hydropathic Association of Physicians and Surgeons.

Trall authored the two volume Hydropathic Encyclopedia in 1851. He recommended daily bathing and using cool or cold water. In 1853, Trall founded the New York Hydropathic and Physiological School that issued diplomas. It became known as the New York Hygeio-Therapeutic College in 1857. He transferred operations to New Jersey in 1867, with his Hygeian Home. He edited The Water-Cure journal, which he later renamed The Herald of Health. Trall was an advocate of a system known as "hygeiotherapy", a mixture of hydrotherapy with diet and exercise treatment regimes that included fresh air, hygiene and massage. It almost disappeared by his death in 1877 but was revived by Sebastian Kneipp in the 1890s.

Trail wrote the introduction to John Mullaly's 1853 exposé of the Swill Milk Scandal.

== Relationship with the Seventh-day Adventist church ==
One of Trall's students was Merritt Kellogg a Seventh-day Adventist who obtained an M.D. degree from his college. Kellogg formed a union with Trall and he later received approval from James Springer White. Trall was invited to teach a course of health lectures in Battle Creek at the close of annual general conference meetings in 1868. Ellen G. White did not attend Trall's lectures but she spoke with him on daily carriage rides around the streets of Battle Creek and they exchanged ideas of disease, health and hygiene.

Trall earned the Whites trust and he was asked to become a regular contributor to the Health Reformer magazine. The former editor, Horatio S. Lay was removed and James White re-organized the magazine with an "Editorial Committee of Twelve" with Trall's "Special Department" of articles. Trall disbanded his own monthly Gospel of Health magazine and turned its subscription list to the Health Reformer. The newly re-organized magazine had high hopes but problems soon emerged. The readers of the magazine resented Trall's extreme dietary strictures against the use of butter, eggs, milk, oil, salt and sugar. Trall's opinions on diet were regarded by readers as "radical and fanatical" and many gave up becoming subscribers. The Whites were disappointed that readers were cancelling their subscription. In 1871, James White took over editorship of the Health Reformer and pledged to take away the extreme dietary ideas, however, Trall continued to write for the magazine.

Trall's department remained in the magazine but James had Ellen start a second "Special Department" which clarified in the March 1871 issue that readers "should not feel disturbed on seeing some things in these departments which do not agree with their ideas of matters and things". The magazine soon became a White family production with advertisements, articles by James and Ellen's monthly department. Within two years, White had successfully raised subscriptions of the Health Reformer from 3000 to 11,000. Trall remained on good terms with James and Ellen White but resigned from their magazine in 1874. However, John Harvey Kellogg blamed Trall for the magazine's early difficulties. Kellogg became its editor in 1874 and changed the magazine's name to Good Health in 1878.

== Vegetarianism ==
Trall was an influential promoter of vegetarianism and was vice-president of the American Vegetarian Society. His The Hygeian Home Cook-Book published in 1874 is the first known vegan cookbook in America. The book contains recipes "without the employment of milk, sugar, salt, yeast, acids, alkalies, grease, or condiments of any kind." Trall opposed the consumption of alcohol, coffee, meat, tea and the use of salt, sugar, pepper and vinegar. He believed that spices were dangerous to health.

In 1910, physician David Allyn Gorton noted that Trall's diet was "most simple and abstemious, consisting chiefly of Graham bread, hard Graham crackers, fruits, and nuts—two meals a day, without salt."

== Selected publications ==
- The Hydropathic Encyclopedia (two volumes, 1851)
- Tobacco: Its History, Nature, and Effects, with Facts and Figures for Tobacco-Users (1854)
- Fruits and Farinacea: The Proper Food of Man (John Smith, with notes and illustrations by R. T. Trall, 1856)
- The New Hydropathic Cook-Book (1857)
- Water-Cure for the Million (1860)
- The Scientific Basis of Vegetarianism (1860)
- Hand-Book of Hygienic Practice (1864)
- The True Healing Art: Hygienic vs. Drug Medication (1872)
- The Hygienic Hand-Book (1873)
- The Hygeian Home Cook-Book (1874)
- Popular Physiology (1875)

== Gallery ==
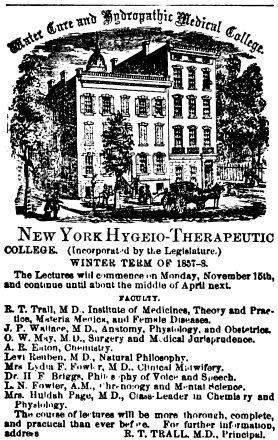
New York Hygeio-Therapeutic College, 1857

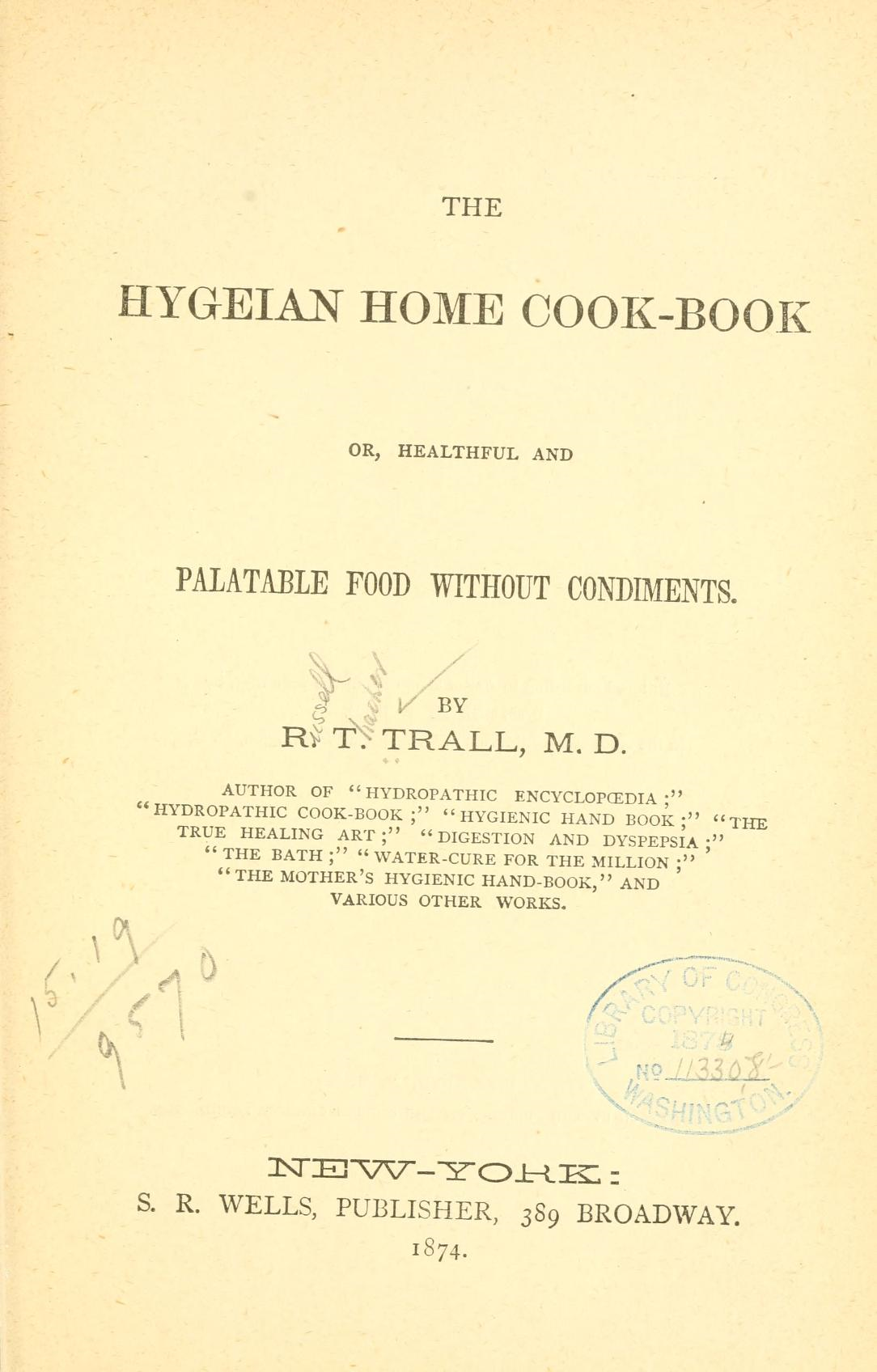
The Hygeian Home Cook-Book, 1874

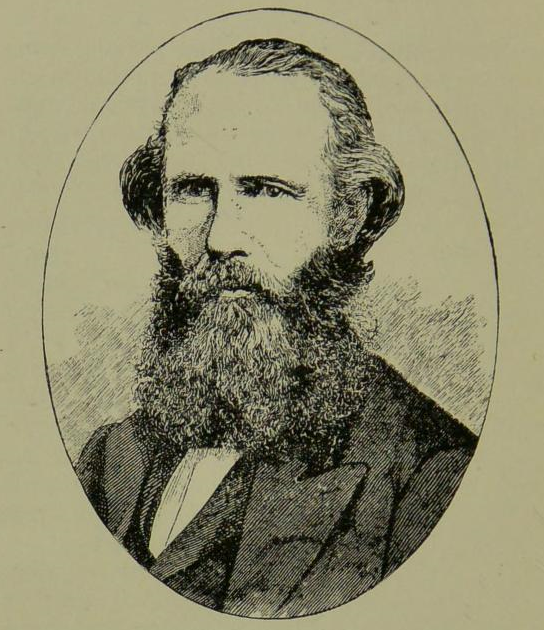
Sketch of Trall
