= The Vegetarian Magazine =

American vegetarian magazine (1900–1934)

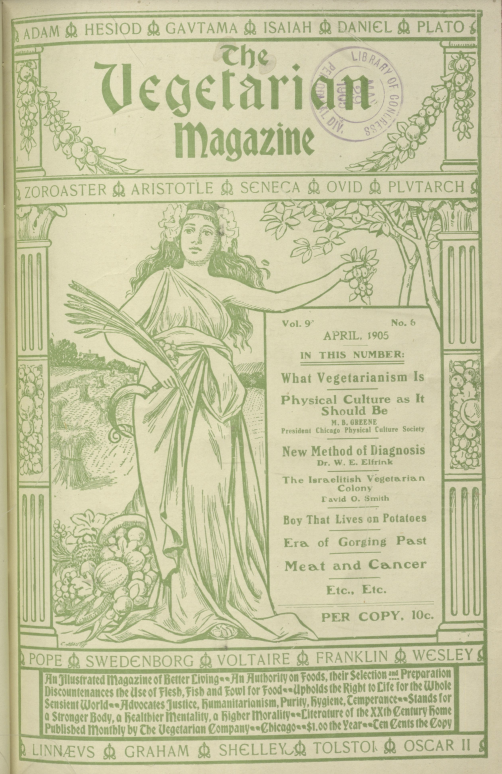
- The Vegetarian Magazine, Vol. 9, No. 6, cover dated April 1905
- Categories: Diet, lifestyle
- First issue: 1900
- Final issue: 1934
- Company: The Vegetarian Company
- Country: United States
- Based in: Chicago; Juliaetta, Idaho (1920–1927); Lewiston, Idaho (1927–1934)
- Language: English

The Vegetarian Magazine was an American vegetarian magazine, published from 1900 to 1934. It was the official organ of several organizations, including the Vegetarian Society of America. In the early 20th century, the magazine also supported women's suffrage. The magazine advertised itself as standing for "a cleaner body, a healthier mentality and a higher morality".

== History ==
In 1896, the Chicago Vegetarian Society published the Chicago Vegetarian magazine. In 1900, it merged with the Vegetarian Society of America's Food, Home and Garden to form The Vegetarian Magazine.

The magazine appeared under several titles. It was published as The Vegetarian and Our Fellow Creatures from January 1901 to April 1903, The Vegetarian Magazine from June 1903 to March 1925, The Vegetarian Magazine and Fruitarian from April 1925 to January 1926, The Vegetarian and Fruitarian from February 1926 to 1927, and Vegetarian Magazine and Fruitarian from February 1920 to August 1934. Publication was suspended from May 1913 to January 1919.

The magazine was the official organ of the Chicago Vegetarian Society from 1896 to 1899, the Vegetarian Society of America from 1900 to 1925, and the National Vegetarian Society from 1926 to 1934.

=== The Vegetarian Company ===
The Vegetarian Company in Chicago published the magazine until 1919 and carried advertisements for vegetarian restaurants. In 1909, the company's elected officers were Harlan Page Albert as president, George J. Drews and Walter E. Elfrink as vice-presidents, and Jean Roberts Albert as secretary. The company sold peanut butter, vegetarian soap, Ko Nut, a butter made from cocoa nut oil, and Kunghphy, a coffee substitute. In 1911, the company reported a magazine circulation of 16,000.

=== National Vegetarian Society ===
The magazine was published by Jean Roberts Albert of the National Vegetarian Society in Juliaetta, Idaho, from 1920. Publication moved to Lewiston, Idaho, in May 1927. Albert was also its editor from February 1919; according to Shurtleff and Aoyagi, Albert worked on the magazine in the evenings and on Sunday while maintaining paid employment, and used her savings to pay for printing and mailing. Leah Leneman described Albert as an early vegan, as she did not consume dairy or egg products.

The National Vegetarian Society's officers were L. J. C. Daniels as president, George Starr White as vice-president, and Jean Roberts Albert as secretary. The board of directors included Otto Carque, William Howard Hay, and Philip G. Peabody. Albert died from heat stroke in 1937.

== Women's suffrage ==
Before the 20th century, the magazine rarely mentioned women's suffrage. In the early 1900s, editor Rena M. Atchison was a suffragist, and by 1910 the magazine advertised itself as a magazine for women and a "promulgator of Woman suffrage".

== Collections ==
The Kansas Historical Society holds a large collection of the magazine's volumes.
