= Eugene Christian =

American naturopath

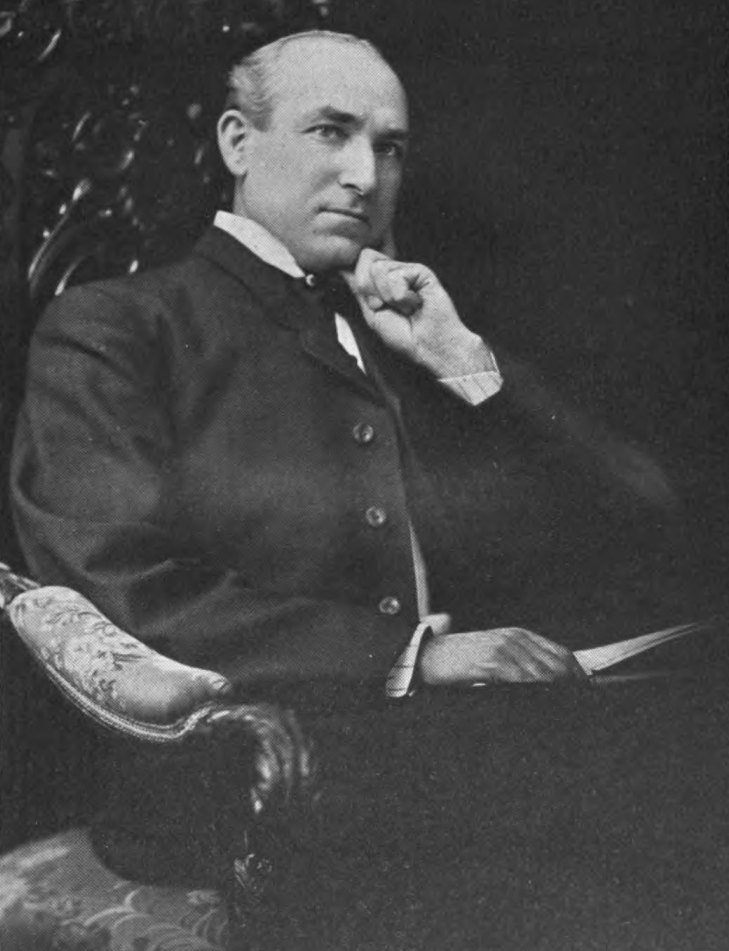
- Born: 1860; McMinnville, Tennessee
- Died: 1930 (aged 69–70); San Diego, California
- Occupations: Naturopath, nutritionist, writer

Eugene Christian (May 30, 1860–1930) was an American naturopath, nutritionist and raw foodism writer.

== Biography ==
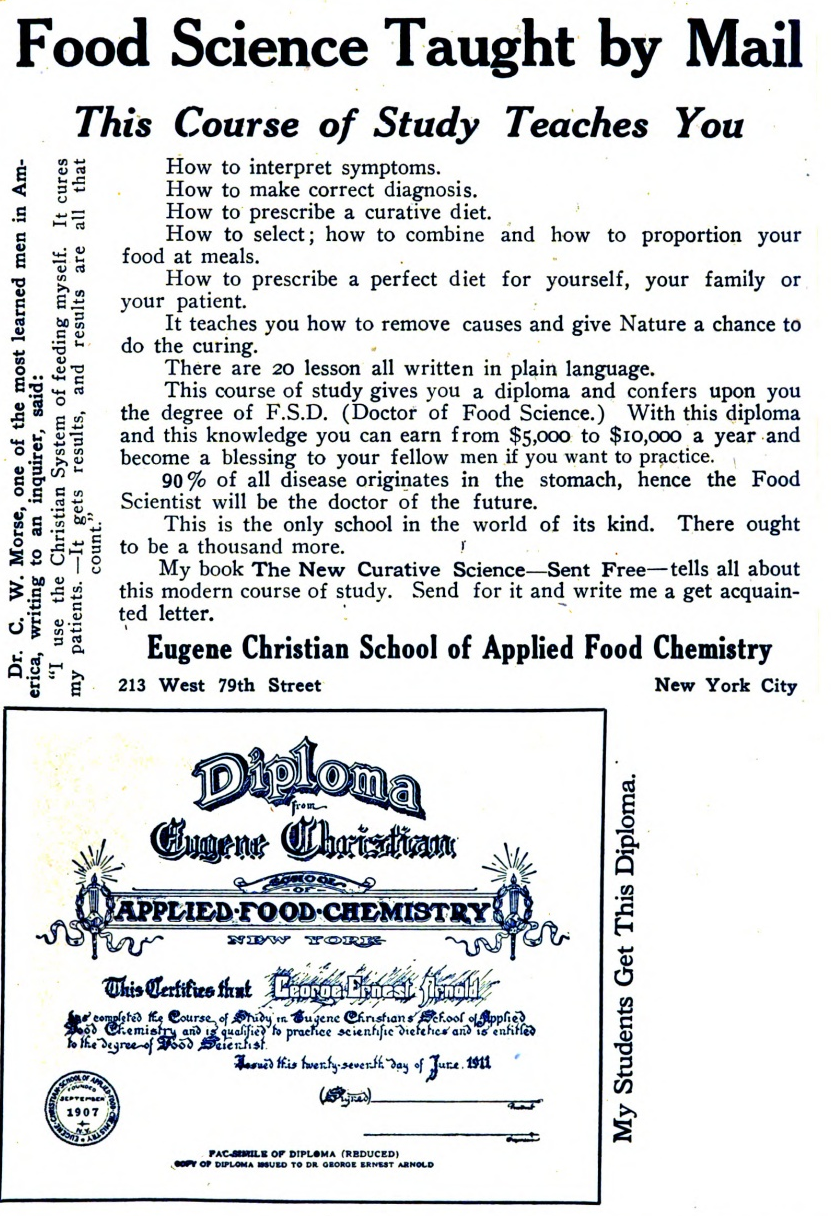
Eugene Christian School of Applied Chemistry

Christian was born in McMinnville, Tennessee. He worked in manufacturing and sales until 1900. Similar to George J. Drews, Christian was one of the pioneers of the raw foodism movement in America. Christian authored the raw food book Uncooked Foods and How to Use Them, in 1904. The book was popular and went through five editions in 1904. It went through ten editions through 1924 and was printed up until the late 20th century. It was widely reviewed in health journals. Medical experts accused Christian of promoting a fad diet and called him the "dean of American food faddists".

Christian had no medical qualifications, advertised himself as a "food scientist" and practiced diet therapy. In 1905, he was arrested and prosecuted by the New York County Medical Society for practicing medicine without a license. In 1907 after an appeal, the New York Supreme Court concluded that no crime was committed and that Christian was improperly convicted. Christian did not prescribe medicine. The Supreme Court decided that a "food scientist" does have the right to diagnose or treat illness by prescribing diet. Christian then advertised himself as a "hero" and "vindicated by the supreme court". Christian believed that cooking food destroyed nutrients. During World War I, he appealed to the Surgeon General to change the army's rations to a raw food diet.

Christian was the owner of the "Christian Natural Food Company", he also operated a mail-order school, the Eugene Christian School of Applied Food Chemistry. He charged $100 for a diploma course in which an F. S. D. degree (Doctor of Food Science) was awarded. The school faded and he formed the Christian Dietetic Society and School of Scientific Eating. He sold a "Course in Scientific Eating" for $10. The organization merged into the Corrective Eating Society. The Society offered a course for $3 which promised to teach people how to cure disease through a dietetic system. The Society sold quack products such as the "Vaco Reducing Cup", that was alleged to remove fat. His products were described as "pseudo-scientific buncombe" by the Bureau of Investigation of the American Medical Association.

Christian recommended raw egg as a good source of protein. He commented that "an egg should never be cooked". He promoted a raw vegetarian diet. However, in volume eleven of Eugene Christian's Course in Scientific Eating, he wrote that "eggs and, once a week, a small service of fish or fowl, may be eaten to maintain the balance as to protein." Christian promised his followers that they could live a hundred years on his recommended diet but died at the age of 69. He died of pneumonia in San Diego, California. In medical literature, Christian was cited as an example of a quack.

== Selected publications ==
- Uncooked Foods and How to Use Them (1904)
- Suncooked Food (1909)
- 250 Meatless Menus and Recipes (1910)
- Encyclopedia of Diet (5 volumes, 1914)
- How to Live 100 Years (1914)
- Eat and Be Well (1916)
- Eugene Christian's Course in Scientific Eating (24 volumes, 1916)
- Little Lessons in Corrective Eating (2 volumes, 1916)
- Meatless and Wheatless Menus (1917)
- Why Die (1928)

== See also ==
- St. Louis Estes
- John and Vera Richter
