= St. Louis Estes =

American dentist and raw food diet proponent

St. Louis A. Estes
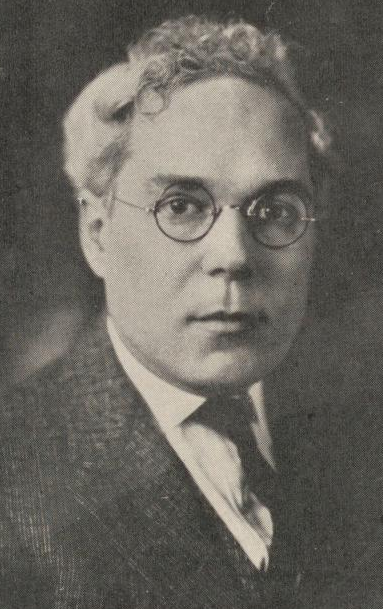
- Born: April 2, 1876; Missouri, US
- Died: May 2, 1951 (aged 75); Los Angeles, California, US
- Resting place: Holy Cross Cemetery, Culver City, California, US
- Occupations: Dentist, raw foodist
- Spouse(s): Clara Augusta Neiman, Esther Moraine

St. Louis Albert Estes (April 2, 1876 – May 2, 1951) was an American dentist, naturopath, convicted fraudster and proponent of a raw food diet. In 1929, he was credited as being the founder of the raw food movement in the United States. Originally a dentist, Estes was unhealthy at the age of thirty and began a raw food diet to improve his health. He later began speaking on the topic in lectures around the country. Estes also believed in breathing techniques that would achieve maximum absorption of oxygen.

== Life ==
Estes was born in Missouri and died in Los Angeles County, California at age 75 years. When interviewed for newspaper and magazine articles in the 1920s–1930s he claimed to be approximately 15 years older than records show that he actually was.

Estes was the son of Louis A. and Emma Medora Estes. Estes graduated from Northwestern College of Dentistry. and originally practiced dentistry in Chicago, Illinois. His first wife was Clara Augusta Neimann Estes (1872–1936), and he had three children from this marriage—in birth order, two daughters, Clara Lucille (born c. 1909) and Phoebe Estes (born c. 1911), and a son, St. Louis Estes Jr. (born c. 1913).

Circa 1928, Estes and his second wife (marriage 1922–1923), Esther Moraine Estes (born Esther Moran in Kentucky in 1895), settled in Van Nuys, California at the adobe built Spanish style ranch hacienda located on 10 acres at the corner of Bessemer and Woodman Avenue, which formerly belonged to American actor Noah Beery Sr.

In February 1930, Clara Estes filed suit in Los Angeles County California Superior Court against Estes for $500,000 for desertion and non-support, and for the same dollar amount against "Esther Moran" for alienation of affection. Estes responded that he had obtained a divorce against Clara Estes in Mexico in 1922. In agreement with the superior court, Clara dropped the $500,000 demand and Estes agreed to pay her a $300 monthly allowance.

During the late 1920s through the 1930s, Estes was particularly active with health lecture tours in various cities throughout the United States, including Carnegie Hall in New York City. Mrs. Estes and whatever number of children were generally included in both the promotion and the tour program itself according to newspaper coverage of the day. In addition to his book "Raw Food and Health", Dr. and Mrs. Estes established a company called "Back to Nature", along with a magazine publication by the same name. "Back to Nature" also had a complete line of vitamins (with a photo of the Estes children on the label) and health food products.

Estes promoted a method of breath control that he termed "brain breathing". In September 1930 he taught his method to police officers in Los Angeles. In the late 1930s, Estes and his wife moved to San Francisco, California, where their last child, St. Louis Estes VII, was born. They later returned to Southern California and were residing in Van Nuys, California, at their respective deaths. In Los Angeles, California, in March 1941 Dr. St. Louis Estes filed for bankruptcy, listing his debts as $245,369 (including an unpaid Federal income tax bill of $104,000), and assets of $4,400 (including $600 worth of health foods).

Estes and his wife had 12 children (six boys and six girls) by 1938, raising them all on a raw food diet from birth. It was decided that Estes would name the boys, which he did as "St. Louis Estes" with the suffix "II" thru "VII". Mrs. Estes named all the girls. The family employed a man by the name of "Prince de Vigni", who claimed to be the last surviving member of the royal family of Silesia, to tutor their children four hours each day.

== Raw foodism ==
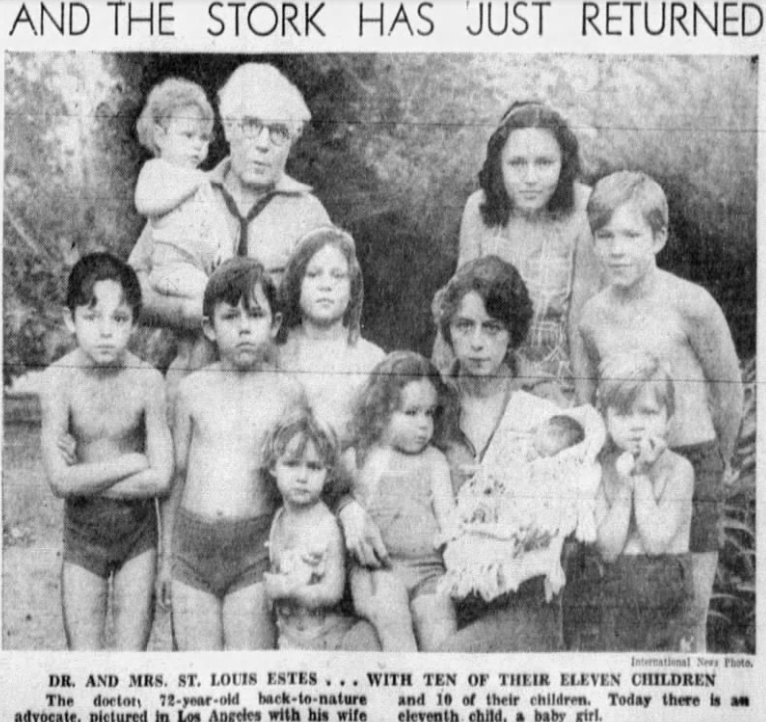
St. Louis Estes with his family in 1937

Estes promoted a back to nature philosophy and a raw food diet. In 1923, he authored Raw Food and Health. It was republished in 1927 and went through many editions. Estes founded the American Raw Food, Health and Psychological Club. He was the editor of Back to Nature Magazine. Estes was also the founder of the American Raw Food and Health Association. He argued that people could live to a 150 years of age on a raw food diet.

Estes' raw vegetarian diet consisted of fruit juices, uncooked vegetables, raw eggs, raw milk, and white clover honey. All of his children consumed the same diet.

== Convictions ==
In 1935, Estes pleaded guilty on two counts of using the mail to defraud. He solicited advance orders through mail for copies of his book How to Live 100 Years and received payment. However, he never published the book. He was granted leniency by Federal Judge William P. James who postponed his sentencing for one year. Estes was ordered to refrain from engaging in any promotional venture and had to report to a probation officer every sixty days for the year.

In 1940, Estes was convicted of ten counts of practicing medicine without a license. In 1942, a bench warrant was filed for Estes to execute sentence for his 1940 conviction for the violation of Section 2141 of the California Business and Professions Code which was affirmed by the Superior Court in December 1941. Estes was apprehended in Los Angeles and returned to San Francisco where he served 150 days in county jail. An imposed $2500 fine was not collected due to Estes filing bankruptcy.

== Death ==
Estes died on May 2, 1951. He slipped and fell around the large pool at the family ranch hacienda in Van Nuys, California. He fell into a coma and never recovered. According to his death certificate (Los Angeles County D/C #6879), and due to his service in the Spanish–American War, Estes died at the Veterans Administration Hospital, West Los Angeles, California, He and his wife, Esther Estes, are buried at Holy Cross Cemetery, Culver City, California.

In October 1951, two children accidentally drowned in Estes' swimming pool.

== Reception ==
Louis Estes's raw food health claims were criticized as pseudoscientific. The State of California Board of Medical Examiners noted that Estes was a "notorious health food quack". Estes fabricated details about his background. Estes claimed that he was a "Lecturer on U. S. Public Health Service". The Surgeon-General of the United States Public Health Service in October 1924 notified the American Medical Association that Estes is not connected with the Public Health Service.

An article in Life published in 1938 described Estes as a "very successful food faddist who has grown rich by telling people to eat as he does". Physician Morris Fishbein described Estes as a "notorious charlatan" who sold "bogus health foods".

== Selected publications ==
- St. Louis Estes (1923), Raw Food and Health, Chicago: American Raw Food, Health and Psychological Club

== See also ==
- Arnold Ehret
- Norman W. Walker
- Herbert M. Shelton
- Ann Wigmore
