= A phi =

A phi' (AΦ) may refer to:

- Alkaline phosphatase
- Alpha Phi
