= Eden ahbez =

American songwriter and recording artist (1908–1995)

eden ahbez
- 1960 album cover

Background information
- Also known as: eden ahbez George McGrew
- Born: George Alexander Aberle; April 15, 1908; Brooklyn, New York, U.S.
- Died: March 4, 1995 (aged 86) Los Angeles, California, U.S.
- Genre: Exotica
- Years active: 1940–1995

George Alexander Aberle (April 15, 1908 – March 4, 1995), known as eden ahbez, was an American songwriter and recording artist of the 1940s to 1960s, whose lifestyle in California was influential in the hippie movement. He was known to friends simply as ahbe.

Ahbez composed the song "Nature Boy", which became a No. 1 hit for eight weeks in 1948 for Nat "King" Cole. Living a bucolic life from at least the 1940s, he traveled in sandals and wore shoulder-length hair and beard, and white robes. He camped out below the first L in the Hollywood Sign above Los Angeles and studied Asian mysticism. He slept outdoors with his family and ate vegetables, fruit, and nuts. He claimed to live on $3 per week.

== Early life ==
Ahbez was born in Brooklyn, New York, to Jewish father George Philip Aberle and English mother Margaret Annie (Mason) Aberle. He spent his early years in the Brooklyn Hebrew Orphan Asylum of New York. He then traveled in an orphan train, was adopted in 1917 by a family in Chanute, Kansas, and raised under the name George McGrew.

During the 1930s, McGrew lived in Kansas City, Missouri, where he performed as a pianist and dance band leader. In 1941, he arrived in Los Angeles and began playing piano in the Eutropheon, a small health food store and raw food restaurant on Laurel Canyon Boulevard. The cafe was owned by John and Vera Richter, who followed a Naturmensch and Lebensreform philosophy influenced by the Wandervogel movement in Germany. He was a vegetarian. He recalled once telling a policeman: "I look crazy, but I'm not. And the funny thing is that other people don't look crazy, but they are."

Their followers, known as "Nature Boys" and who included Gypsy Boots (né Robert Bootzin), wore long hair and beards and ate only raw fruits and vegetables. During this period, he adopted the name "eden ahbez", choosing to spell his name with lower-case letters, claiming that only the words God and Infinity were worthy of capitalization.

== Career ==
In 1947, ahbez approached Nat "King" Cole's manager backstage at the Lincoln Theater in Los Angeles and handed him the music for his song, "Nature Boy". Cole began playing the song for live audiences to much acclaim, but needed to track down its author before releasing his recording of it. Publicity material for Cole's single instead makes the claim that Johnny Mercer recommended ahbez to Cole on behalf of Capitol Records. Jack Patton, in turn, is said to have advised ahbez to bring "Nature Boy" to Capitol after befriending him at the restaurant where ahbez worked.

Ahbez was discovered living under the Hollywood Sign and became the focus of a media frenzy during the summer of 1948, when Cole's version of "Nature Boy" shot to No. 1 on the Billboard charts and remained there for eight consecutive weeks. In early 1948, RKO Radio Pictures paid ahbez $10,000 for the rights to "Nature Boy" to use as the theme song for their film The Boy with Green Hair, and he was credited as the song's composer on the film's opening titles. Ahbez was covered simultaneously in Life, Time, and Newsweek magazines; Frank Sinatra and Sarah Vaughan later released versions of the song.

Ahbez faced legal action from Yiddish music composer Herman Yablokoff, who said the melody to "Nature Boy" came from one of his songs, "Shvayg mayn harts" ("Be Still My Heart"). Ahbez claimed to have "heard the tune in the midst of the California mountains". However, legal proceedings resulted in a payment to Yablokoff of $25,000 in an out-of-court settlement.

Ahbez continued to supply Cole with songs, including "Land of Love (Come My Love and Live with Me)", which was also covered by Doris Day and The Ink Spots. In 1949, he gave Burl Ives the idea to cover Stan Jones' "Ghost Riders in the Sky" after overhearing Jones recording his own version of the song. He worked closely with jazz musician Herb Jeffries; in 1954, the pair collaborated on an album, The Singing Prophet, which included the only recording of ahbez's four-part "Nature Boy Suite". The album was later reissued as Echoes of Eternity on Jeffries' United National label.

In the mid-1950s, ahbez wrote songs for Eartha Kitt, Frankie Laine, and others, as well as writing some rock-and-roll novelty songs. In 1957, his song "Lonely Island" was recorded by Sam Cooke, becoming the second and final ahbez composition to hit the Top 40.

In 1959, he began recording instrumental music, which combined his signature somber tones with exotic arrangements and (according to the record sleeve) "primitive rhythms". He often performed bongo, flute, and poetry gigs at beat coffeehouses in the Los Angeles area. In 1960, he recorded his only solo LP, Eden's Island, for Del-Fi Records. This mixed beatnik poetry with exotica arrangements. Ahbez promoted the album through a coast-to-coast walking tour, making personal appearances, but it sold poorly.

During the 1960s, ahbez released five singles. Grace Slick's band, the Great Society, recorded a version of "Nature Boy" in 1966 and ahbez was photographed in the studio with Brian Wilson during a session for the Smile album in early 1967. Later that year, British singer Donovan sought ahbez in Palm Springs, California, and the two wanderers shared a reportedly "near-telepathic" conversation. In the 1970s, Big Star's Alex Chilton recorded a version of "Nature Boy" with the photographer William Eggleston on piano.

== Personal life ==
Some time in 1947, he married Anna Jacobson, a month after they met; the couple had a son, Tatha "Zoma" Om Ahbez, on October 9, 1948.

His wife Anna (née Annette Jacobson; October 16, 1915 – August 9, 1963) died, aged 47, of leukemia, and his son "Zoma" died unexpectedly in either 1965, 1969 or 1971. In 1974, ahbez was reported to be living in the Los Angeles suburb of Sunland, and he owned a record label named Sunland Records, for which he was recording under the name Eden Abba. From the late 1980s until his death, ahbez worked closely with Joe Romersa, an engineer/drummer in Los Angeles. The master tapes, photos, and final works of ahbez are in Romersa's possession.

== Death ==
Ahbez died on March 4, 1995, of injuries sustained in a car crash, at the age of 86. Another album, Echoes from Nature Boy, was released posthumously.

== See also ==
- William Pester
- Gypsy Boots
- List of vegetarians
