= John and Vera Richter =

American raw food advocates

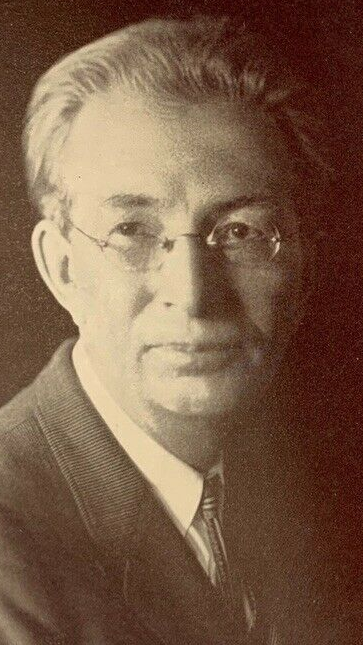
John Richter in 1953

John Theophilus Richter (June 10, 1863 – January 24, 1949) and Vera May Richter (née Weitzel, December 11, 1884 – January 13, 1960) were an American married couple who ran an early raw food restaurant in Los Angeles, the Eutropheon, which became a meeting place for influential figures in the development of alternative lifestyles in California between 1917 and the late 1940s.

== Biography ==
Theophilus John Richter was born in Illinois, (Note: Sources stating that Richter was born in North Dakota, or alternatively in Germany, conflict with census records that show he was born in Illinois.) the first son of Pastor Frederick Leberecht Richter and his wife Caroline Wilhelmina (née Grauman), who were immigrants from Germany and married in Chicago. When he was a child, the family lived in St. Peter, Minnesota, and Minneapolis, before settling in the late 1870s in the newly established city of Fargo, North Dakota, where Pastor Richter became a drug store owner and physician. During the 1880s, Theophilus Richter worked as a machinist while taking a natural healing course in Chicago, based on the "Battle Creek" system devised by John Harvey Kellogg. He adopted a vegetarian diet, and also gained a diploma in the "Swedish movement cure". According to Richter, he took over some of his father's patients in Fargo, and began treating them successfully using natural remedies. In 1891 he married Violet Berry, and in the early 1900s they moved with their children from Fargo to Minneapolis. He gained a qualification and began practicing there as a naturopathic physician. By 1911, he adopted a raw food diet, influenced by the theories of Benedict Lust and talks held in Minneapolis by a Chicago doctor, George Drews, and decided to dedicate his life to the promotion of the raw vegetarian diet.

After his first wife's death, he remarried in 1918, to Vera Weitzel, a native of Pennsylvania. Little is known of her background. The couple moved to Los Angeles, where he became known as Dr. John T. Richter. Shortly afterwards, the couple established a raw vegetarian food restaurant, the Eutropheon (from Greek words meaning "good nourishment"), at 833 South Olive Street. In 1925, Vera Richter published a book, Mrs. Richter's Cook-less Book, which included many of the food recipes served in the Eutropheon, and received considerable local publicity. The couple favored eating fruit in the morning, green vegetables and nuts for lunch, and root vegetables and nuts in the evening. They were opposed to the use of coffee, sugar, salt, tobacco, alcohol, meat, dairy products, cooked food, and refrigeration, and promoted massage, heliotherapy, iris diagnosis, sun gazing, barefoot walking, and naturism. They defended the ideals of the Russian Revolution, and supported US socialist leader Eugene Debs. They lectured in the area, promulgated works on health and natural living by German writers such as Arnold Ehret, Louis Kuhne, and Adolf Just, and were regularly patronized and promoted by Los Angeles gymnasium owner, newspaper columnist and radio host Philip M. Lovell. The Richters established two further Eutropheon restaurants in southern California, which Lovell described as "the only ... restaurants in the country that function without the aid of a cookstove". In 1936, Dr. John T. Richter published Nature the Healer, a book that went through several editions. The widespread use of the term "raw fooder" has been attributed to the Richters. They believed that, with a raw food diet, people should all live to be 140 years old.

According to one source, "the Eutropheon's phonograph boomed out Hawaiian music while uncooked soups were served with a side of raw vegetables. The body builder community of Los Angeles's first weights rooms and fitness centers rubbed shoulders with the Californian Naturmenschen, the 'nature boys.'" The restaurant became known as a venue where the Californian "nature boys" – who included William Pester, Robert "Gypsy Boots" Bootzin, and eden ahbez – would occasionally work, meet, stay, and share experiences. There, ahbez met singer, songwriter and radio personality Cowboy Jack Patton, who heard ahbez's song "Nature Boy" and encouraged him to pass it to Nat King Cole; Cole's recording of the song became a worldwide hit in 1948.

The Richters sold the Eutropheon restaurants to a former employee, Milan Geshtacoff, during the 1940s. It is thought that the restaurants closed in the late 1940s. John Richter died in 1949, aged 85, and his wife Vera died in 1960, aged 75.

== Publications ==
- Mrs. Richter's Cook-less Book (1925)
- Nature the Healer (originally published: 1945)
