= Rena M. Atchison =

American suffragette and teacher

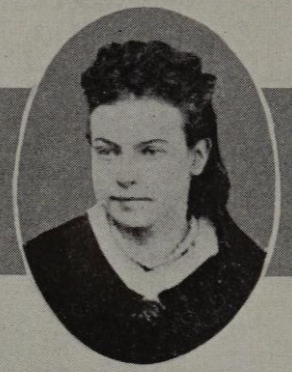
- Born: Rena Michaels Atchison; 1857; Lysander, New York
- Died: 29 October 1933 (aged 76); Wrightwood, Chicago
- Occupations: Activist, teacher
- Spouse: Wilbur Fisk Atchison (m. 1893)

Rena Michaels Atchison (1857 – 29 October 1933) was an American suffragette and co-founder of Alpha Phi. She was Dean of Women and Professor of French Literature at Northwestern University.

== Career ==
Atchison was born in Lysander, New York. She was educated at Syracuse University and graduated from Albion College. She obtained her bachelor’s degree in 1874, master’s degree in 1879 and a PhD in 1880. Atchison was a co-founder and first president of Alpha Phi in 1892.

Atchison was a Professor of French and Spanish at DePauw University and a teacher of romantic languages at Upper Iowa University. She was Professor of French Literature from 1883 to 1893 and Dean of Women at Northwestern University from 1886 to 1891. She wrote for the Chicago Evening Post. Atchison married Reverend Wilbur Fisk Atchison in 1893, a pastor of the Hyde Park Methodist Church. They resided at Hyde Park, Chicago before moving to Morgan Park, Illinois.

Atchison was an active member of the Woman’s Christian Temperance Union and was secretary of Illinois State Equal Suffrage Association.

== Views ==
=== Immigration ===
Atchison was concerned about immigration to the United States and authored Un-American Immigration: Its Present Effects and Future Perils in 1894. The book was based on the 1890 United States census. Atchison supported immigration from Europeans of Anglo-Saxon decent up until the 1860s, crediting them with representing the "best artisanship" and "progressive thought" who had assimilated into American institutions but opposed the recent immigration of Eastern Europeans and Russians for being illiterate, unskilled laborers or without occupation.

=== Vegetarianism ===
Atchison was an activist for vegetarianism and was elected president of the Chicago Vegetarian Society in December 1897. In the early 1900s she was editor of The Vegetarian Magazine.

== Death ==
Atchison died on 29 October 1933 at her home in Wrightwood, Chicago.
