= Rejuvelac =

Kind of grain water

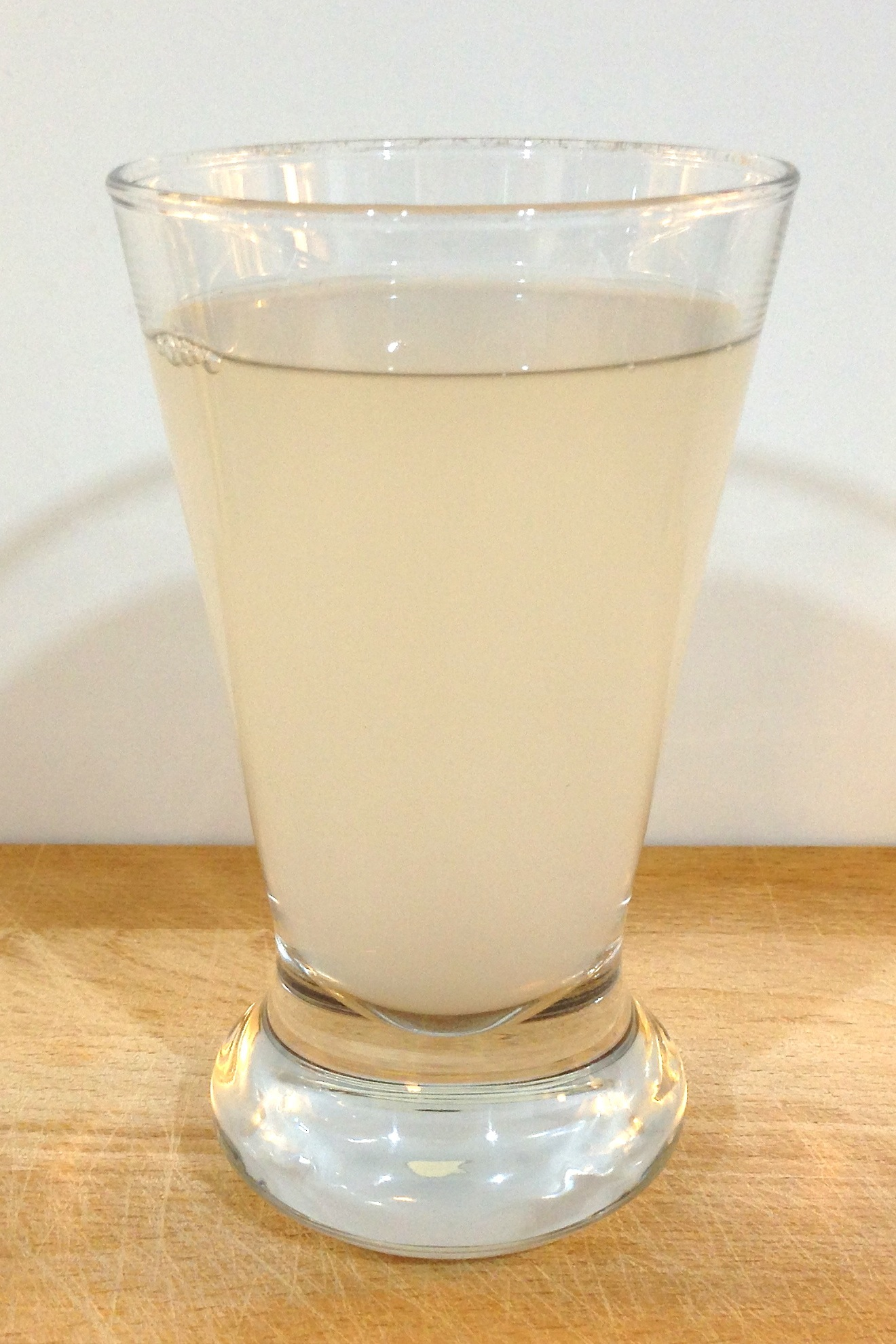
- Fresh rejuvelac fermented from sprouted buckwheat

Rejuvelac is a kind of grain water that was invented and promoted by Ann Wigmore, born in Cropos, Lithuania. The beverage is closely related to a traditional Romanian drink, called borș, a fermented wheat bran that can be used to make a sour soup called ciorbă or as the basis for vegan cheeses.

Rejuvelac is a raw food made by soaking a grain or pseudocereal (usually sprouted) in water for about two days at room temperature and then reserving the liquid. A second batch can be made from the grain/pseudocereal, this time requiring only about one day to ferment. A third batch is possible but the flavor may be disagreeable. The spent grain/pseudocereal is usually discarded afterward.
