= Béla Bicsérdy =

Raw foods and holistic medicine advocate

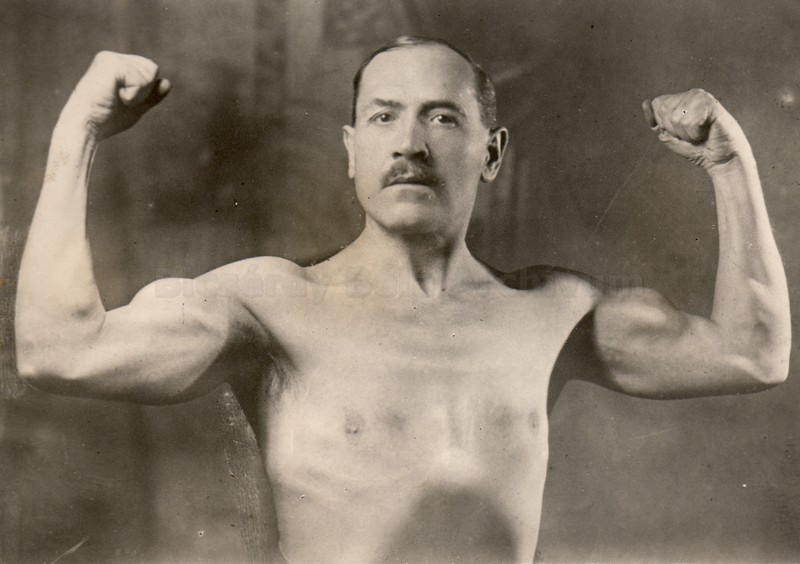
- Born: 22 February 1874; Zenta, Kingdom of Hungary
- Died: December 7, 1951 (aged 77); Billings, Montana, U.S.
- Scientific career
- Fields: Naturopathy, Vitalism

Béla Bicsérdy (Zenta, February 22, 1874 – Billings, Montana, December 7, 1951) was a Hungarian pioneer in health culture, lifestyle reformer, alternative medicine advocate, lecturer, author of many books, athlete, supporter of rawism, fasting and holistic therapies.

== Life and career ==
According to Bicsérdy, after medical doctors couldn't cure him from his illnesses, he became a raw foodist and took long fasts. Bicsérdy claimed that he cured himself from all his illnesses, and his hair and lost teeth grew back.

In the 1920s, Bicsérdy inspired a great many people in Transylvania and Hungary promoting a regime of a raw vegetarian diet (mostly fruits with some bread and raw milk), regular fasting, sunbathing, daily outdoor exercising and regular water-cure. He claimed that any person who followed his regime will be cured of illness and will live hundreds of years, just as known possible from ancient times (the Bible for example reported many long-lived people).

Bicsérdy delivered lectures throughout Transylvania where he had his greatest following. The method became known as bicsérdism and by 1925 he had 120 to 150 thousand followers in Transylvania alone. He wrote a popular book on the subject which was inspired by mazdaznan philosophy, and in which he compared his own beliefs with the Zoroastrian Zend Avesta. In addition to the book there was a periodical that was first published in 1925, as On Behalf of Mankind and later under the title Bicsérdism. After a few people died due to long fasting he received serious criticism. At the end of the 1920s, he withdrew from public life. By the mid 1940s, bicsérdism had largely been forgotten.

At the end of the World War II he moved with his fifth wife, Kató Jaschke to Germany, and then in 1951 to the USA, where he died in the same year, at the age of 79.
