= Martha Foote Crow =

American higher education leader and writer

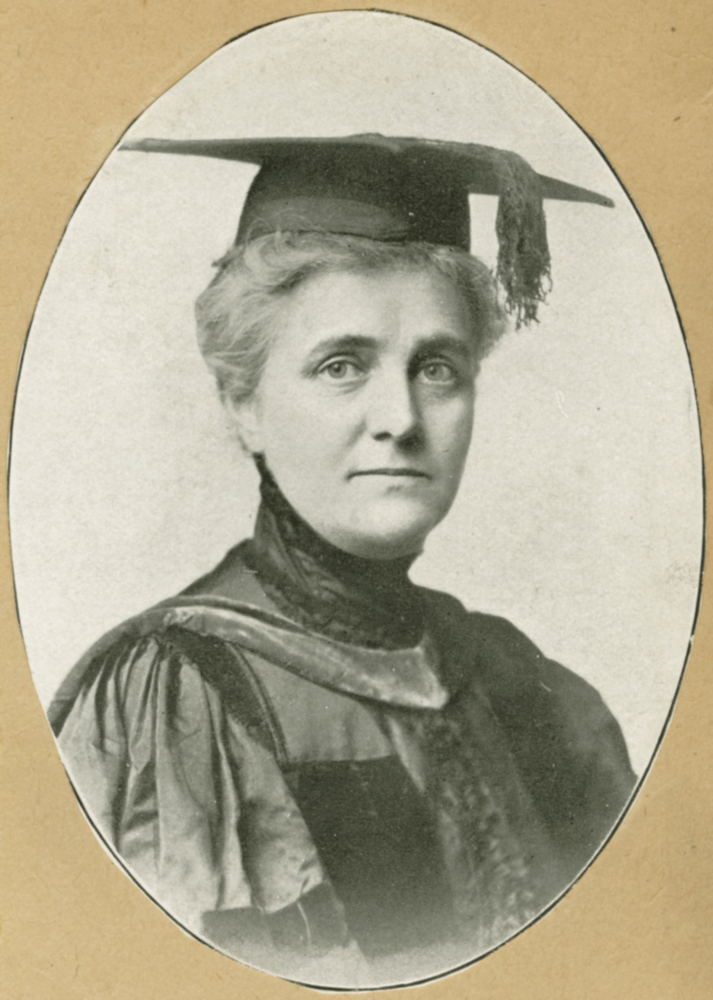
- Born: Martha Emily Foote; May 28, 1854; Sackets Harbor, New York
- Died: January 1, 1924 (aged 69); Chicago, Illinois
- Education: Syracuse University
- Occupations: Educator, writer
- Spouse: John M. Crow (m. 1885; died 1891)

Martha Emily Foote Crow (May 28, 1854 – January 1, 1924) was an American educator and writer. Born in Sackets Harbor, New York, she played an important role in the development of higher education for women in the United States.

== Biography ==
Martha Foote Crow was born in Sackets Harbor, New York, to Reverend John B. and Mary Pendexter (Stilphen) Foote on May 28, 1854.

In 1872, while studying at Syracuse University, she was one of the founding members of the sorority Alpha Phi. She earned a Ph.B. in 1876 and Ph.M. in 1878, and finally her Ph.D. in English literature in 1886, all at Syracuse.

In 1885, she married John M. Crow, an archaeologist. John Crow joined the faculty of Iowa College (now Grinnell College) in 1884, and Martha Foote Crow became "Lady Principal" of the college (1884–1891) and preceptress (1884–1888) of the academy that operated under the college's auspices. While at Iowa College, she participated in the work of the Association of Collegiate Alumnae, coordinating an international survey of women's higher education. She also served as the Association's President from 1893 to 1895.

Upon her husband's death from tuberculosis in 1891, Martha Foote Crow left Grinnell to become assistant professor of English literature at the University of Chicago. In 1900, she became Dean of Women at Northwestern University. While at Northwestern, she participated in the formation of an association of deans of women, organizing the 1903 Conference of Deans of Women of the Middle West.

On January 1, 1924, Martha Foote Crow died in Chicago, Illinois. In 1996, Alpha Phi published a biography of Martha Foote Crow.

== Publications ==
- Elizabethan Sonnet Cycles (1896)
- The World Above (1905)
- Elizabeth Barrett Browning (1907)
- Harriet Beecher Stowe, a Biography (1913)
- The American Country Girl (1915)
- Lafayette (1916)
- Christ in the Poetry of Today (1917)

== Alpha Phi ==
Martha Foote Crow was one of the 10 founders of Alpha Phi fraternity.
