= Carl Malmberg =

American public health educator and writer

- Born: 26 June 1904; Oshkosh, Wisconsin
- Died: 6 February 1979 (aged 74); Hanover, New Hampshire
- Occupations: Public health educator, writer

Carl Malmberg (26 June 1904 – 6 February 1979) was an American public health educator, translator and writer.

== Biography ==
Malmberg was born in Oshkosh, Wisconsin. He was the son of Anton Martin and Kirsten Marie Malmberg. He was educated at Lawrence University (1921–1923) and Columbia University (1924–1927). He was editor of the Health and Hygiene magazine (1936–1938). He was a managing supervisor for the American Optometric Association (1938–1939). He married Elizabeth Newhall on January 10, 1940.

In the 1940s Malmberg was a Public Relations Advisor, Information Specialist for United States Public Health Service and Chief Investigator for U. S. Senate Subcommittee on Health and Education. He was a writer for the Democratic National Committee (1945–1946).

Malmberg translated many articles and books from Danish, Norwegian, and Swedish. He was a member of the American Translators Association and the New Hampshire Historical Society.

He wrote fiction novels under the pseudonym Timothy Trent. Towards the end of his life he resided at West Lebanon, New Hampshire.

== Diet and Die ==
In 1935, Malmberg authored Diet and Die, a skeptical book critical of fad diets. The book criticized dietary fads, pseudo-scientific nutrition claims and quack remedies. Malmberg critically examined the ideas of fasting, naturopathy, vegetarianism, low-protein diets, Gayelord Hauser's Eliminative Feeding System, Hay diet, mucusless diet and many others.

A review in the Journal of the American Medical Association concluded that "the book may well be recommended by all physicians to patients who are interested in being disillusioned relative to the fallacies that recur again and again in the field of nutrition." The American Journal of Clinical Pathology, commented that "this excellent expose of fads and fadists who have plied their trade on the unsuspecting public is well worth reading. Physicians can do a real service for their patients by seeing that they procure a copy of it."

A 1937 review in The Philippine Journal of Science described the book as a "startling revelation of the different diet fads and medicinal frauds that are now found in the market... In this book one will find many popular diets in vogue in America, criticized severely and their inconsistencies and dangers clearly presented."

== Death ==
Malmberg died on 6 February 1979 in Hanover, New Hampshire, aged 74.

== Publications ==
Nonfiction

- Diet and Die (New York: Hillman-Curl Inc, 1935)
- 140 Million Patients: The Revealing Facts Behind Health and Medical Care in America (New York: Reynal & Hitchcock, 1947)
- America is Also Scandinavian (New York: G. P. Putnam's Sons, 1970)
- Warner, New Hampshire 1880-1974 (Warner Historical Society, 1974)

Fiction (as Timothy Trent)

- Night Boat (Godwin, 1934).
- All Dames are Dynamite (Godwin, 1935)
- Fall Guy (Godwin, 1936)

Translations

- Leif Panduro. (1961). Kick Me in the Traditions. Eriksson.
- Carl Erik Soya. (1961). Seventeen. Eriksson.
- Jacob Paludan. (1966). Jorgen Stein. University of Wisconsin Press.
- Leif Panduro. (1967). One of Our Millionaires Is Missing. Grove.
- Tom Kristensen. (1968). Havoc. University of Wisconsin Press.
- Jens Kruuse. (1968). War for an Afternoon. Pantheon.
- Jens August Schade. (1969). People Meet. Dell.
