= Otto Carque =

American vegetarian and author (1866–1935)

Otto Carqué
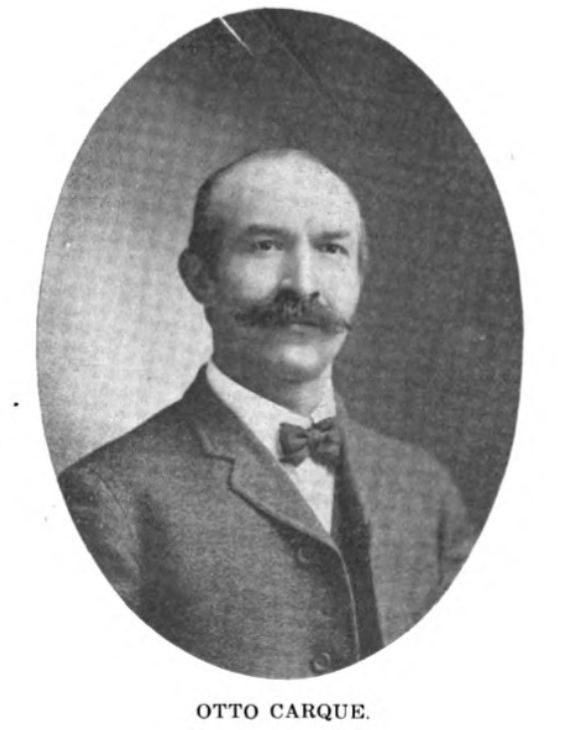
- Born: July 11, 1866; Wiesloch
- Died: January 9, 1935 (aged 68); Los Angeles
- Occupations: Businessman, writer

Otto Heinrich Carqué (11 July 1866 – 9 January 1935) was an American businessman, fruit grower, naturopath, raw foodist, vegetarian and writer. He was the first to use the term natural food.

== Biography ==
Carqué was born on 11 July 1866 in Wiesloch from Louis Carqué and Anna née Zentner both born in Alsace. He lived in Mannheim, Germany and migrated to America as a young man. Carque arrived in New York City in 1887 and became an associate of Henry Edward Lane, a practitioner of iridology. He became a vegetarian before he was 28 and promoted the benefits of a vegetarian diet, exercise, fresh air and nude sunbathing. Carque has been credited as the first person to use the term "natural food" to refer to food that has not been adulterated or refined.

It was reported in 1895 that Carque had "lived 15 years on raw foods, then fresh fruits and vegetables, varied occasionally with eggs, cheese and nut butters, unroasted." In 1912, Carque established the "Carque Pure Food Company". He sold Mission figs at a Los Angeles grocery store. From 1922, he wrote advertisements in the Los Angeles Times for his own natural food products consisting mostly of dried fruits and nuts known as "Natural Foods of California".

Carque's Pure Food Company was established at South Magnolia Ave, Los Angeles and specialized in selling sun-dried Mission figs, dried fruits, and nuts. He advertised his food as "pure natural food products". In 1920, Carque was grinding flour in his own mill. The following year he set up another health food store at West Seventh in Los Angeles. In 1925, he was located at the "Natural Foods Building" at 729 Seward, Los Angeles. He authored a 359-page book titled Natural Foods: The Safe Way to Health. In 1926, he had two more health food shops in downtown Los Angeles.

He married Lillian Carque in California in 1926. In 1931, he renamed his company "Carque Natural Foods". In 1933, Carque closed his shops and moved to South Maple Ave, Glendale where he specialized in wholesale business.

Carque authored many books and pamphlets which promoted a vegetarian diet. He also opposed the consumption of alcohol, coffee and tea. His book Rational Diet: An Advanced Treatise on the Food Question was advertised and sold by the Defensive Diet League of America.

Carque was an early advocate of the alkaline diet and was concerned that people were in danger of excessive acidity. He argued that the main sources of alkalinity in the diet were fruits, including citrus fruits. Carque, Eugene Christian and George J. Drews are credited as founding the American raw food movement in the early 20th century.

== Death ==
Carque died on January 9, 1935, from traffic accident injuries. In 1937, Carque's food manufacturing was sold by his wife.

== Publications ==
- Meat Eater Vs. Vegetarians (in: Physical Culture, 1902)
- The Folly of Meat Eating (1904)
- The Foundation of All Reform. A Guide to Health, Wealth, and Freedom. A Popular Treatise on the Diet Question (Chicago: Kosmos Publishing, 1904)
- Flesh Eating and War (in: Health Culture, 1917)
- Rational Diet. An Advanced Treatise on the Food Question (Los Angeles: Times-Mirror Press, 1923)
- Natural Foods: The Safe Way to Health (1925)
- The Key to Rational Dietetics (1926)
- Mrs. Carqué's Recipe Book (Los Angeles: Otto Carqué, 1928)

== See also ==
- Raw foodism
