= Wrightwood, Chicago =

Neighborhood in Chicago

Wrightwood is a neighborhood on the far southwest side of Chicago, Illinois. Wrightwood is located within the Greater Ashburn community area, in its eastern section. The neighborhood is bounded by Columbus Avenue (north), Western Avenue (east), 87th Street (south), and Kedzie Avenue (west). The neighborhood is predominantly African-American and middle-class. It was the first section of Ashburn to racially integrate.

== Education ==
Wrightwood has several public schools, such as Charles Carroll Elementary School, Carroll-Rosenwald School, and Chicago International Charter School Wrightwood campus. St. Rita of Cascia High School is the only private school in the neighborhood.
