= William Pester =

Hippie styled as the "Hermit of Palm Springs" (1885–1963)

- Friedrich Wilhelm Pester
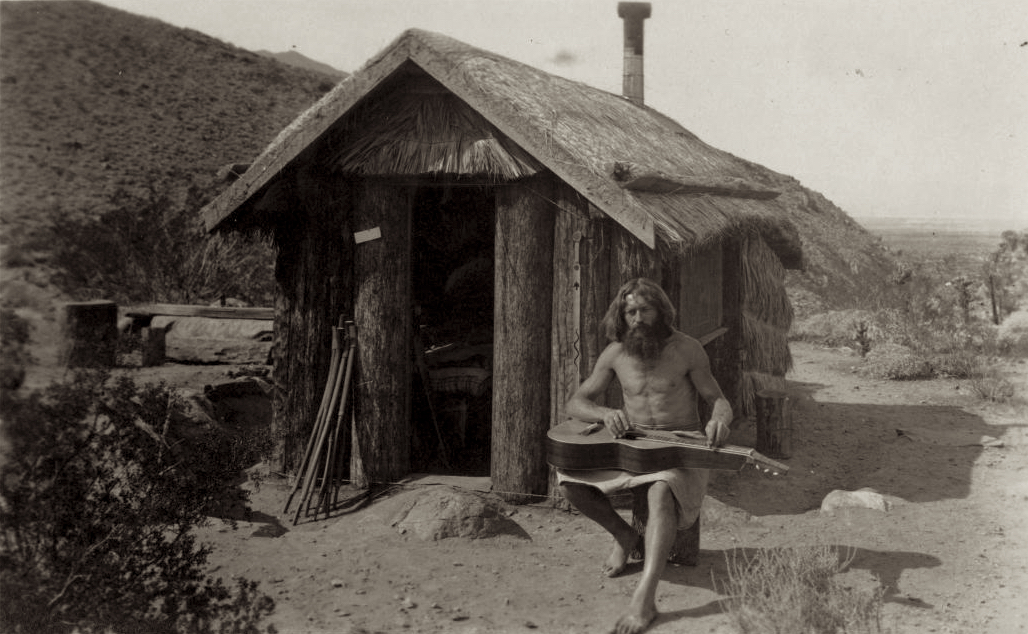
- Pester in front of his cabin in Palm Springs, California, 1917
- Born: July 18, 1885; Borna, Saxony, German Empire
- Died: August 12, 1963 (aged 78); Arizona, United States
- Occupation: Philosopher of lebensreform
- Criminal charge: California Penal Code 288a, for "oral copulation with a minor"
- Criminal penalty: Sent to prison in 1940
- Criminal status: Released on parole in 1946

William Frederick Pester (born Friedrich Wilhelm Pester, July 18, 1885 – August 12, 1963) was a German-born American pioneer of hippie lifestyles in California in the first half of the twentieth century, known as "the Hermit of Palm Springs". He was described as epitomizing "the strong link between the 19th century German reformers and the flower children of the 1960s", and inspired the eden ahbez song "Nature Boy", recorded by Nat King Cole and others.

== Biography ==
Pester was born in Borna, Saxony, Germany, the third son of Hermann Friedrich Pester and his wife Maria. After his mother's death, he was apprenticed as a stonemason. In 1906 he left Germany to avoid military service and went to the United States. A follower of the philosophy of Lebensreform, he was also influenced by popular novels written by Karl May about Native Americans, writer Gordon Kennedy suggesting that "in the hearts and minds of every young German immigrant were dreams of some magic lands in the far west of America, where cactus grew and massive mountains emptied their streams into some palm oasis in the sandy deserts, along with the obligatory wild Indians still in residence."

Pester traveled west and, after a year in Hawaii, settled, in about 1916, in Tahquitz Canyon, near Palm Springs, California, part of the ancestral home of the Cahuilla people. His presence was accepted by local people, and he built himself a palm hut beside a stream and palm grove. Pester was a vegetarian. He spent much of his time exploring the local area, as well as reading and writing. According to writer Gordon Kennedy,

He earned some of his living making walking sticks from palm blossom stalks, selling postcards with Lebensreform health tips, and charging people 10 cents to look through his telescope while he gave lectures on astronomy. He made his own sandals, had a wonderful collection of Indian pottery and artifacts, played slide guitar, lived on raw fruits and vegetables and managed to spend most of his time naked under the California sunshine.

He became a well-known figure of curiosity, and was occasionally visited by celebrities such as writer Zane Grey and, around 1920, by film actor Rudolph Valentino. According to his biographer Peter Wild, "tourists by the hundreds parked their tin lizzies along the sandy road into Palm Canyon" to visit the "hermit turned showman." Wild described Pester as "a short, slim man ... with long hair, almost naked, and with blue eyes full of distance ... gentle and even likeable in his mild way ... " From 1927, Pester established his own plot of land in Indio, California, returning to Palm Canyon at weekends.

In 1940, he was arrested under California Penal Code 288a, for "oral copulation with a minor". He was also suspected by some of being a German spy and sending radio messages to Germany from the top of the San Jacinto Mountains. It is thought that he pleaded guilty to ten charges of "sexual perversion", and was imprisoned at San Quentin Prison and later Folsom Prison, before being released on parole in 1946.

Authorities differ over whether Pester and songwriter and fellow natural lifestyle adherent eden ahbez ever met. Some sources date ahbez's arrival in California to 1941, when Pester was already imprisoned, while others state that ahbez arrived several years earlier and, knowing of Pester, would certainly have met him then. Gordon Kennedy says: "Pester was one of the most photographed people in the desert ... and he made frequent trips to Palm Springs all through the 1930s to connect with friends and get food. How could ahbez have lived with the Richters off and on for several years and not known about Pester? Pester was one of their customers and may have stayed there too." Whether or not he was wholly or partly inspired by Pester, ahbez wrote the lyrics of "Nature Boy" and gave the song to Nat King Cole in 1947; it became a popular success when his recording was released in 1948.

Pester lived in Los Angeles in 1948, and the following year was reported as saying that Palm Springs was becoming overdeveloped and that he intended to buy a boat and sail to a remote and thinly populated island. He later married, and died in Arizona in 1963, at the age of 78. He was buried at Yavapai County Cemetery in Prescott, Arizona.

The site of Pester's original cabin in Palm Canyon was later developed as an Indian trading post, and is now known as "Hermit's Bench". In 1985 Millie Fischer published a booklet about Palm Canyon that included a chapter on Pester, and a biography, William Pester: the Hermit of Palm Springs, was written by Peter Wild and published in 2008.

== See also ==
- Eden ahbez
- Gypsy Boots
- List of vegetarians
