= Arnold Ehret =

German naturopath and alternative health educator

- Freiburg, Germany, c. 1914/15
- Born: 29 July 1866; Freiburg, Grand Duchy of Baden
- Died: 10 October 1922 (aged 56); Los Angeles, California, US
- Scientific career
- Fields: Naturopathy, vitalism

Arnold Ehret (July 29, 1866 – October 10, 1922) was a German naturopath, alternative health educator and germ theory denialist, best known for developing the Mucusless Diet Healing System. Ehret authored books and articles on dieting, detoxification, fruitarianism, fasting, food combining, health, longevity, naturopathy, physical culture and vitalism.

In opposition to medical science that asserts white blood cells are important components of the immune system, Ehret believed that white blood cells are caused by consuming mucus-forming foods, and as waste materials, poison the blood. His ideas about diet and disease have no scientific basis and have been criticized by medical experts as dangerous.

== Life ==
Ehret was born in 1866, in St. Georgen (Black Forest), Schwarzwald, Baden, near Freiburg, southern Germany.

Ehret's interests were physics, chemistry, drawing and painting. In 1887 at age 21, he graduated as a Professor of Drawing from a college in Baden. After studying in Frankfurt, he then taught there at a technical school for 15 years. Ehret was discharged from the army after nine months because of a heart condition. During the 1890s his health deteriorated and he took interest in naturopathy. He visited Sebastian Kneipp's water cure sanatorium in Wörishofen. He embraced fasting and a diet that consisted primarily of fruit. He founded a sanitarium in Switzerland and used his diet to treat people. He moved to the United States in 1914 and attended the Panama–Pacific International Exposition of 1915. He opened an office in Los Angeles to promote his ideas.

As a young man, it is alleged that Ehret was diagnosed with Bright's disease which he cured with his mucusless diet but no reliable evidence has confirmed this (Bright's disease is inflammation of the kidneys). In his later life, Ehret convinced himself he possessed psychic powers. He attended seances and stated that he had contacted the spirit of his deceased father.

Ehret developed and marketed the Innerclean Intestinal Laxative. In the 1930s the product was investigated and found to be fraudulent (see Criticism section).

Much of Ehret's early life is alleged to have been documented by Anita Bauer, a spiritualist. Bauer authored Arnold Ehret's Story of My Life in 1980 after claiming she had been visited by Ehret's ghost. Historians have questioned if the book is nothing more than "lurid fiction".

On 9 October 1922, Ehret fell while walking down a street, sustaining a fatal injury to his head.

== Views on human health ==
=== Disease ===
Ehret claimed that pus and mucus-forming foods were the cause of human disease, "schleimlose" (slime-free) foods were the key to human health, and "fasting (simply eating less) is Nature's omnipotent method of cleansing the body from the effects of wrong and too much eating."

=== Fasting ===
In 1907, Ehret, who was based in Freiburg, visited Monte Verità, a nature life colony in Ascona, Switzerland, near Lake Maggiore, whose visitors included Lenin and Trotsky. After collaborating with Henri Oedenkoven who owned a sanitarium at Monte Verità, Ehret opened a sanitarium in Ascona and another in nearby Lugano (Massagno), writing one of his books in Locarno. Around 1909, Ehret engaged in a series of public lectures and fasts monitored by German and Swiss officials. In 1909, he claimed he fasted for 105 days in total. In 1910, he wrote an article for a German vegetarian magazine about his 49-day fasting experience, which gained the public's interest, and which later appeared in his book Lebensfragen (Life Questions).

For 65 years, Fred and Lucille Hirsch published Ehret's literature and the torch symbol found on Ehret's books became the logo of the Ehret Health Club. In 1979, the Ehret Literature Publishing Company Inc, in New York, inherited Ehret's publications and archive of unpublished German manuscripts.

=== Vitalism ===
Having denounced the nitrogenous-albumin metabolic theory in 1909, Ehret learned of a contemporary, Thomas Powell, in 1912, who concurred with his belief that "grape sugar" (simple sugars in fruits and vegetables) was the optimum fuel source, body building material, and agent of vital energy for humans, not protein rich foods. Powell had set out his beliefs in the book "Fundamentals and Requirements of Health and Disease," published in 1909. Ehret claimed alkaline foods, which were also mucusless, formed the natural diet of humans.

Ehret asserted that the body is an air-gas engine, not dependent on food for energy, and that the body was not designed to utilize mucus-forming foods, offering the equation Vitality = Power − Obstruction (V = P − O) to demonstrate this. Ehret also claimed the lungs were the pump in the body, while the heart acted as a valve, with the blood controlling the heart. Ehret further believed that white blood cells were the result of ingesting mucus-forming foods.

=== Metabolism influence on health ===
Ehret maintained that new tissue was built primarily from simple sugars in fruits, not metabolised from protein and fat-rich foods. Ehret favored nuts and seeds only during transition (and only in the winter) to the ideal fruit diet, and even then, only "sparingly," condemning high-protein and fat-rich foods, as "unnatural," writing further that "no animals eat fats" and "all fats are acid forming, even those of vegetable origin, and are not used by the body." Later editions of his Mucusless Diet Healing System published by Fred S. Hirsch, claimed nuts were "mucus-free." Ehret specifically renounced meat, eggs, milk, fats, cereals, legumes, potatoes, and rice, whilst recognizing the transitional value in some of these. Ehret, citing Ragnar Berg, stated that fats and proteins were acid-forming and were to be consumed in moderation, as did Ehret's contemporary: Otto Carque.

=== Religious views ===
Along with his sister, Ehret was brought up as a Roman Catholic. He believed in God, but took issue with the Church because of its dietary requirements in a letter to the Pope, and subsequently quit the Church, though his faith in God remained. After his death, the Archdiocese of Los Angeles, who was aware of his writings on Jesus, wrote to Fred Hirsch to confirm he would ban Catholics from reading Ehret's religious writings, if published. Prior to this, Ehret was popular with the bishop and the Catholic fraternity.

== Criticism ==
None of Ehret's claims are recognized as valid by experts in the scientific, medical, and nutritional fields to the present day. They largely contradict well-understood biology and chemistry, and are unsupported by any evidence.

Mucusless diets were critiqued as unscientific in the book Diet and Die by health writer Carl Malmberg in 1935. The "Special Committee on Aging" of the 88th US Congress published a report on "Frauds and Quackery effecting the Older Citizen" in 1963, in which it mentions Ehret as a quack whose "cultists earnestly believed that women who adhered to the diet program of 'Professor' Arnold Ehret could expect 'immaculate conception.'"

In 1978, Ehret's mucusless diet was listed as a fad diet as "its claims are not substantiated scientifically." Physician Terrence T. Kuske has written that Ehret's mucusless fruitarian diet "lack[s] high quality utilizable protein as well as adequate levels of many vitamins." Kuske also commented that "there is no evidence that prolonged fasting provides any significant benefits."

Nutritionist Kurt Butler and physician Lynn Rayner have noted:

Like macrobiotics, the mucusless diet system promotes a dangerous idea, that the more you suffer during starvation, the more you need to be starved to "cleanse the system". This leads unfortunate victims to cling fanatically to the system and dismiss all signs of malnutrition as signs that poisons are being expelled and the diet is working."

Ehret held a number of non-scientific beliefs that were documented by Butler and Rayner, such as:

- White blood cells are decayed mucus in the blood that cause disease.
- Lungs pump blood through the body; the heart is merely a valve.
- Mental illness is the result of gas pressure on the brain from mucus decay.
- Fasting can cure insanity.
- Consuming rice causes leprosy.
- Dandruff is dried mucus.
- A mucus-free body never sweats.
- Nocturnal emissions expel mucus, but cease on a mucusless diet.
- Gonorrhoea is caused by eating mucus foods.
- A clean-blooded body sends electromagnetic radiation through the hair, which is important in sexual attraction.
- Hairless persons are sexually inferior.
- The white race is unnatural. The white skin colour is the result of mucus-laden white blood corpuscles clogging the system.

Ehret was a germ theory denialist and made many other pseudoscientific claims such as his mucusless diet system curing blindness and deafness. He also stated that fasting could cause electricity to run through the body awakening one to a "spiritual world".

=== Innerclean ===
Ehret's Innerclean Intestinal Laxative was produced by the Innerclean Manufacturing Company of Los Angeles and was sold through mail order. The Innerclean product was issued with a four-page leaflet advertising the Mucusless-Diet Healing System of Ehret. The product was said to cleanse and rejuvenate the intestines by "remov[ing] from the intestines hardened feces, mucus, and other age-old uneliminated, imperfectly digested, fatty substances." An examination by the American Medical Association's Chemical Laboratory revealed that the product was made from a mixture of chopped herbs such as Senna, an indigestible residue of agar, and sand. In 1926, the Journal of the American Medical Association noted that "the harm that a mixture of that sort might do to an inflamed mucous membrane or an inflamed intestinal mucous membrane can easily be realized by physicians and even intelligent laymen."

In October 1931, 125 cartons of Innerclean were seized at Brooklyn, New York, because of misbranding in violation of the Pure Food and Drug Act. The United States Secretary of Agriculture Arthur M. Hyde reported from sampling Innerclean that it was made from Senna leaves, anise seed, and sassafras bark. The product was misbranded with false and misleading health claims. The court released the product under a $4,000 bond, conditioned on agreement that the advisement on the packages was to be removed and destroyed under supervision of the United States Department of Agriculture.

== Later interest ==
In 1950, Swiss author Eduard Berthollet described Ehretism in Le Retour À La Santé Et A la Vie Saine Par Le Jeûne (The Return To The Health And The Wholesome Way By Fasting).

In the 1960s, Ehret's writings gained popularity with the hippie and surf culture of San Francisco, Hawaii, and California. In the 1970s, Paul Bragg rewrote The Mucusless Diet Healing System and Rational Fasting with Hirsch's permission. In 1973, Manuel Lezaeta integrated Ehret's ideas with his 'thermal doctrine' for the elimination of toxins in La Medicina Natural Al Alcance De Todos.

== Selected bibliography ==
- Ehret, Arnold (1935). Kranke Menschen (Fasting Teachings: The Cause & Cure of Human Illness). München: Carl Kuhn Verlag.
- Ehret, Arnold (1971). Kranke Menschen. USA: Benedict Lust Publishers.
- Ehret, Arnold (1924). Mucusless Diet Healing System (2nd ed.). Los Angeles, California: Ehret Literature Publishing Co.
- Ehret, Arnold (1970). Mucusless Diet Healing System a Scientific Method of Eating Your Way to Health. New York: Benedict Lust Publishers.
- Ehret, Arnold (1938). Physical Culture: Fasting and Dietetics (4th ed.). Beaumont, California: Ehret Literature Publishing Co.
- Ehret, Arnold (2014). Prof. Arnold Ehret's Mucusless Diet Healing System Annotated, Revised, and Edited by Prof. Spira (2nd ed.). Columbus, Ohio: Breathair Publishing.
- Ehret, Arnold (2017). Prof. Arnold Ehret's Physical Fitness Thru a Superior Diet Fasting, and Dietetics also a Religious Concept of Physical Spiritual, and Mental Dietetics (1st ed.). Columbus, Ohio: Breathair Publishing.
- Ehret, Arnold (2014). Prof. Arnold Ehret's Rational Fasting for Physical, Mental, and Spiritual Rejuvenation (1st ed.). Columbus, Ohio: Breathair Publishing.
- Ehret, Arnold (1938). Rational Fasting for Physical Mental & Spiritual Rejuvenation (6th ed.). Beuamont, California: Ehret Literature Publishing Co.
- Ehret, Arnold (1971). Rational Fasting: a Scientific Method of Fasting Your Way to Health. USA: Benedict Lust Publishers.
- Ehret, Arnold (2001). The Cause and Cure of Human Illness (2nd ed.). New York: Ehret Literature Publishing Co.
- Ehret, Arnold (1975). The Definite Cure of Chronic Constipation. California: Ehret Literature Publishing Co. Inc.
- Ehret, Arnold (2014). The Definite Cure of Chronic Constipation and Overcoming Constipation Naturally (2nd ed.). Columbus, Ohio: Breathair Publishing.
- Ehret, Arnold (1923). Thus Speaketh the Stomach / the Tragedy of Nutrition. New York: Ehret Literature Publishing Co. Inc.
- Ehret, Arnold (2014). Thus Speaketh the Stomach and the Tragedy of Nutrition (2nd ed.). Columbus, Ohio: Breathair Publishing.
