= Gypsy Boots =

American health guru (1914–2004)

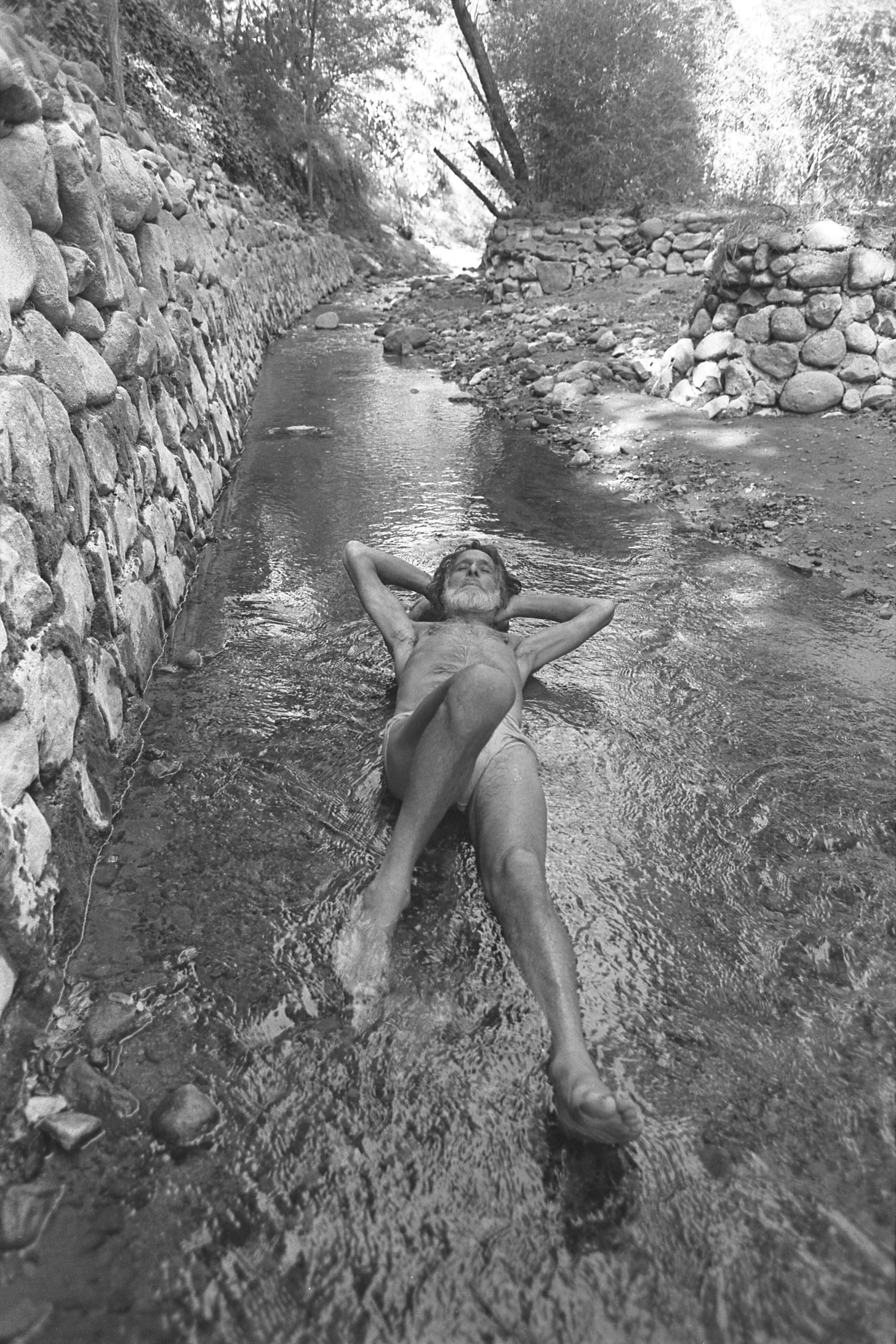
- Bootzin in Los Angeles, 1986
- Born: Robert Bootzin; August 19, 1915; San Francisco, California, U.S.
- Died: August 8, 2004 (aged 89); Camarillo, California, U.S.
- Other name: Boots Bootzin
- Occupations: Vegetarian and Fitness pioneer; actor; writer

Gypsy Boots (August 19, 1915 – August 8, 2004), born Robert Bootzin (also known as Boots Bootzin), was an American fitness pioneer, actor and writer. He is credited with laying the foundation for the acceptance by mainstream America of "alternative" lifestyles incorporating elements such as yoga and health food. He is also known for his vegetarian guide Bare Feet and Good Things to Eat and his memoir The Gypsy in Me.

== Life and career ==
Bootzin was born in San Francisco, California, to Russian Jewish immigrants. His father, Max, worked as a broom salesman. His mother, Mushka, raised Bootzin and his four siblings in a vegetarian household, while also leading the family on hikes in the hills, performing Russian folk dances and feeding the homeless with her home-baked black bread.

Bootzin's older brother, John, died of tuberculosis as a young man; this led to Bootzin's decision to grow his hair long and pursue healthful, natural living.

By 1933, he had dropped out of high school and left home to wander California with a group of self-styled vagabonds. In the 1940s, Bootzin, along with ten to fifteen other "tribesmen," lived off the land in Tahquitz Canyon near Palm Springs, slept in caves and trees, and bathed in waterfalls. Decades ahead of the Hippie movement, Bootzin and his companions had long hair and beards, lived a carefree existence, and were seasonal fruit pickers. The group became known as "Nature Boys." A combination of the philosophy of the Nature Boys and growing counterculture of the 1950s and 1960s in California may have been responsible for the emergence of California spirituality in the 1960s.

The 1948 Nat King Cole hit "Nature Boy" was inspired by Bootzin and his fellow "tribesmen" and was composed by eden ahbez.

In 1958, Bootzin married Lois Bloemker, a conservative, academic woman from Fort Wayne, Indiana, and settled in the Los Feliz – East Hollywood area (Cumberland Ave). They had three children: Daniel, Alex and Freddie (who died in 2001). The two divorced in the late 1990s.

His health food store and organic restaurant "Health Hut" was one of the first of its kind and was patronized by dozens of Hollywood celebrities in the early 1960s.

The original Health Hut, located on Beverly Blvd. just west of La Cienega Blvd., had an authentic "tiki" style to it, being made with leaves and bamboo.

Bootzin personally advocated never eating meat, drinking alcohol, or smoking tobacco. He was an early believer in the health properties of organic foods. One of these organic foods was garlic—and he later became a spokesperson for the "Kyolic" variety. He also did work for a Sonoma cheese factory. He would often have a garlic-spiced cheese, "Sonoma Jack", at his booth at health festivals and fairs in Sonoma Valley, along with his all-natural, sugar-free "Boots Bars", wheat grass, spirulina, and kyolic garlic, as well as "honey-sweet" Medjool dates from his grove.

His childhood vegetarian lifestyle was something Bootzin continued with his own family, as his son Daniel Bootzin corroborated:

When friends came over, Bootzin said his parents offered the guests fresh carrot juice, a novelty in the 1960s.

Bootzin died in Camarillo, California at age 89. He was survived by his former wife, Lois Bootzin, a Lutheran, two of his sons (Daniel and Alexander), three grandchildren, and a sister. His son Freddie died in 2001.

== Appearances ==
Bootzin received national exposure in 1955 when he appeared as a contestant on Groucho Marx's network TV show You Bet Your Life (September 30, 1955, Season 5 Episode 3). Introduced as "Robert Bootzin," he cheerfully espoused his philosophy of clean living, exercise, and healthy eating. Even though he was over 40, he acted like a gangling, goofy, but polite teenager, causing mildly sensational reactions from the audience. When asked by Groucho to demonstrate how he sold figs, he stepped toward the edge of the stage, shouted an attention-getting sales pitch for a few seconds, and then performed a perfect pratfall (the type where one falls sideways after swinging one leg to knock the other one out from underneath). In the game portion of the show, he spelled the word intelligible incorrectly before his partner overruled him. Groucho, who usually displayed little tolerance for extremists, admired Bootzin's rugged individualism and said so, on camera. He also seemed to appreciate the perfect execution of one of vaudeville's classic bits.

His wife appeared on the same programme a few years later with a man who worked as an organ grinder with 13 children who had a monkey that looked and walked like Groucho. She appeared very conservative and polite and nothing like her former husband's appearance, who was as described above. She recalled how she met him while she practiced her ballet on a beach. Bootzin was standing on his head. She found his antics interesting enough to approach him, and the relationship developed from there. Her connection with him was not mentioned on the show and, perhaps because of the organ grinder, may have been overlooked due to time and Groucho's interest in the monkey act.

Bootzin made personal appearances with the Spike Jones musical-comedy troupe, speaking about health foods. He was a regular guest on American television talk shows in the 1960s, appearing 25 times on The Steve Allen Show. On the Allen show he would often play up his role as a health advocate by swinging from a vine on stage as a "Nature Boy", and persuade Steve to drink one of "Gypsy Boots'" concocted fruit health drinks. He referred to this drink as a "smoothie", giving credence to Gypsy Boots as one of the originators of the popular style of blended natural fruit health drinks. He also made frequent appearances on George Putnam's Talk Back, which came at the tail end of the popular KTLA George Putnam News in Los Angeles, California.

He released a record album, Unpredictable, on Sidewalk Records in 1968.

Bootzin was a frequent participant in local events, including the Santa Barbara Summer Solstice Parade and the Calabasas Pumpkin Festival. During the late 1990s and early 2000s, he also appeared in Fourth of July parades in Sonoma, California. In his later years, he promoted kyolic garlic at weekly farmers' markets and community events.

Bootzin was an avid fan of the USC Trojans football team and was known for eccentric clothes and an ever-present cowbell. He also regularly attended Los Angeles Dodgers, Lakers and Raiders games with spirited cheers, noisemakers and streamers. At age 86, he was still able to throw an American football at least 40 yards.

In movies, Bootzin appears sitting in the diner scene in Michael Douglas's film The Game. Other movie appearances include Mondo Hollywood, A Swingin' Summer, and Confessions of Tom Harris, and he can be seen quite frequently at the Monterey Pop Festival in 1967. Bootzin also appeared as a guest emcee at the Newport Pop Festival in August 1968. The Newport Pop was the first festival to draw over 100,000 in attendance. Bootzin also helped with the promotion of the two-day event at the Orange County Fairgrounds. Bootzin enjoyed mingling with the performers, including Sonny and Cher, The Jefferson Airplane, The Grateful Dead, Tiny Tim, Eric Burdon and the Animals, Canned Heat, and a dozen other great acts of the day.

Bootzin's son, Dan, appeared on Dan Harmon's "Harmontown" podcast with his wife Beth, discussing the status of their beloved eucalyptus trees.

Bootzin was warmly remembered by comedian Billy Saluga (whose comic character was named Raymond J. Johnson Jr.: "You can call me Ray! Or you can call me Jay!") on the December 11, 2017, episode of Gilbert Gottfried's Amazing Colossal Podcast.

== Books ==
- Bare Feet and Good Things to Eat (1965)
- The Gypsy in Me (1993)

== See also ==
- eden ahbez
- William Pester
- List of vegetarians
