= Alpha Phi =

North American collegiate sorority

- ΑΦ
- Founded: October 10, 1872; 154 years ago Syracuse University
- Type: Social
- Affiliation: NPC
- Status: Active
- Scope: North America
- Motto: "Union hand in hand"
- Pillars: Sisterhood, Generosity, Innovation, and Character
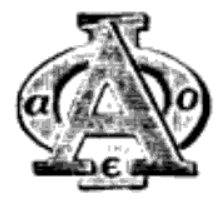
- Member badge
- Colors: Bordeaux and Silver
- Symbol: Ivy
- Flower: Lily of the Valley and Forget-me-not
- Jewel: Ruby
- Mascot: Phi Bear
- Publication: Alpha Phi Quarterly
- Philanthropy: Alpha Phi Foundation
- Chapters: 175
- Members: 250,000+ lifetime
- Nickname: APhi and Phi's
- Headquarters: 1985 S. Josephine Street; Denver, Colorado 80210; United States
- Website: alphaphi.org

Alpha Phi International Women's Fraternity (ΑΦ, also known as APhi) is an international sorority with 175 active chapters and over 270,000 initiated members. Founded at Syracuse University in Syracuse, New York, in 1872, it was the fourth Greek-letter organization for women, and the first women's fraternity founded in the northeast. Alpha Phi is a member of the National Panhellenic Conference, the governing council of 26 women's fraternities. Alpha Phi's international headquarters are located in Denver, Colorado.

== History ==
In September 1872, Martha Foote, Clara Sittser, and Kate Hogoboom invited others to a meeting to discuss forming a women's fraternity at Syracuse University in Syracuse, New York. Alpha Phi was founded on September 18, 1872. Alpha Phi's founding members were, Clara Bradley (Burdette), Florence Chidester (Lukens), Martha Foote (Crow), Ida Gilbert (Houghton), Elizabeth Grace (Hubbell), Jane Higham, Kate Hogoboom (Gilbert), Rena Michaels (Atchinson), Louise Shepherd (Hancock), and Clara Sittser (Williams).

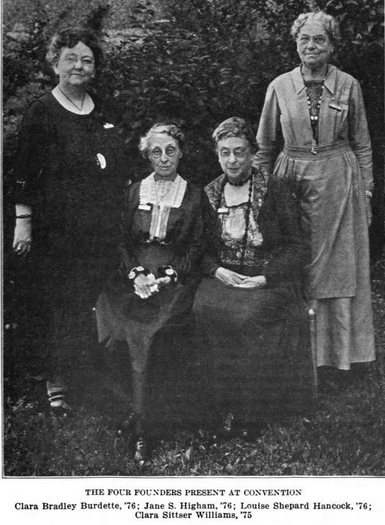
Four founders of Alpha Phi, reunited at a national convention in 1922: Clara Bradley Burdette, Jane Sara Higham, Louise Shepard Hancock, and Clara Sittser Williams.

Alph Phi was the fourth Greek-letter organization founded for women, and the first women's fraternity founded in the northeast. Alpha Phi considers itself a women's fraternity because its founding date predates the invention of the word "sorority". It was formed "on the principles of the promotion of character growth; unity of feeling, sisterly affection, and social communion among the members." Michaels was selected as its first president.

The fraternity initially met at its member's homes. Later, it had a chapter room over Sager and Grave's carpet store on Salina Street for six years. It rented a suite of rooms in the Onondaga County Savings Bank Building from 1878 to 1884. In 1884, the fraternity rented a house; it decided to build a chapter house at the end of that year.

The Alpha chapter of Alpha Iota purchased a lot at 17 University Place in May 1886. With the member's fathers serving as a board of trustees, the fraternity secured a loan to build a chapter house. When the sorority moved into its chapter house in November 1886, it became the first women's fraternity or sorority to own its own chapter house.

Although the actual founding date of the fraternity is September 18, 1872, Alpha Phi has celebrated its Founders Day on October 10 since 1902, since many colleges and universities were not open for classes in mid-September at that time.

Alpha Phi is a member of the National Panhellenic Conference, the governing council of 26 women's fraternities. Alpha Phi's international headquarters are located at 1985 S. Josephine Street in Denver, Colorado.

== Symbols ==
Alpha Phi's public motto is "Union hand in hand". Its ideals or pillars as Sisterhood, Generosity, Innovation, and Character. Its insignia is the constellation of Ursa Major. Alpha Phi's primary symbol is the ivy leaf. Its colors are bordeaux and silver gray. Its flowers are the Lily of the Valley and the Forget-me-not. Its jewel is the ruby. Its mascot is Phi Bear. The fraternity's nicknames are APhi and Phi's.

The Alpha Phi badge is a gold monogram of the Greek letter Alpha (Α) resting on the Greek letter Phi (Φ), engraved with the Greek acronym (Α.Ο.Ε.) in black. It can be customized in silver or gold and may be adorned with only white jewels - pearls or diamonds. Before the adoption of the current badge in 1906, "each member [of Alpha Phi] went to the jeweler of her choice to have her pin designed." Its pledge pin was a silver ivy leaf with the Greek letters ΑΦ.

The fraternity introduced a fifty-year pin at its 42nd convention in 1958. This badge is a silver circle with red stones and is a replica of the pins presented to the founders at the fraternity's 50th anniversary in 1922.

Its publication is the Alpha Phi Quarterly, first published in July 1888.

== Chapters ==
Alpha Phi has chartered 175 chapters.

== Philanthropy ==
In 1956, Alpha Phi became one of the first women's fraternities to establish a Foundation. Alpha Phi officially adopted Cardiac Care as its philanthropic priority in 1946, which then became the Foundation's focus, along with awarding academic scholarships, upon its founding in 1956. The Foundation supports Alpha Phi's leadership training and programming, awards need-based and merit-based scholarships, invests in the advancement of women's heart health, and preserves Alpha Phi's rich and expansive heritage.

The foundation's most notable program is its Women's Heart Health Program and Heart to Heart to Grant, a $100,000 grant awarded to medical professionals to better understand heart disease in women—specifically its symptoms, treatment, and prevention. Since its establishment in 1993, the Heart to Heart Grant has invested over $1.4 million in women's heart health initiatives. Collegiate chapters, alumnae chapters and individual members can nominate a local heart project for the Heart to Heart Grant. Self-nominations are also accepted. The recipient is selected by a team of medical professionals and the Foundation's Board of Directors.

== Local chapter or member misconduct ==
In 2013, Miss America 2015 Kira Kazantsev was terminated from the Theta Mu chapter at Hofstra University for abusive hazing. At the time, Kazantsev was serving the chapter as head of recruitment. Kazantsev denied being abusive and maintained that her not attending a sorority hearing of her case resulted in her termination.

In 2015, the Beta Mu chapter at the University of Alabama took down a recruitment video that was heavily criticized for its lack of diversity and the provocative way in which collegiate women were portrayed.

In October 2016, the Iota Delta chapter at the University of Rhode Island charter was revoked.

In January 2018, Harley Barber, a member of the Beta Mu chapter at the University of Alabama was terminated from the sorority and expelled from the university after posting videos on social media in which she repeatedly used the n-word and other profanities to make degrading comments about African Americans. The incident gained media coverage across the country. University President Stuart R. Bell, the University Panhellenic Association, and Linda Kahangi, executive director of Alpha Phi International Fraternity, released statements.

In January 2018, three members of the Iota Iota chapter at the George Washington University were removed from the organization due to what was deemed a racist social media post. The incident prompted criticism from national and international news sources and the university's Student Association received petitions to remove the chapter from campus.

In September 2018, a document by a former recruitment chair of the University of Michigan Alpha Phi chapter surfaced with descriptions of how the chapter's membership selection process was based on selecting for certain physical appearances and assigning numbers to these women based on the judgment of the recruitment chairs and representatives from their international headquarters. The exposé described that Alpha Phi supervisors ordered her to give the Potential New Members (PNMs) an "External Prescore" based on pictures from their social media profiles. Throughout the recruitment process, active members in the sorority were also ranked on superficial qualities and matched with "stronger" or "weaker" PNMs.

In the fall of 2018, the Alpha Phi chapter at Old Dominion University was suspended for one year from March 22, 2019, through March 22, 2020, and subjected to an organization assessment and action plan for intimidation, use, or possession of alcohol, furnishing or distributing alcohol, and violation of university policy.

In February 2023, the Theta Mu chapter at Hofstra University was accused of body-shaming inductees. At an event they held, they only had size small t-shirts. This chapter also had a reputation for "only allowing thin girls" into the sorority.

== See also ==
- List of social sororities and women's fraternities
