= Raw foodism =

Diet of uncooked and unprocessed food

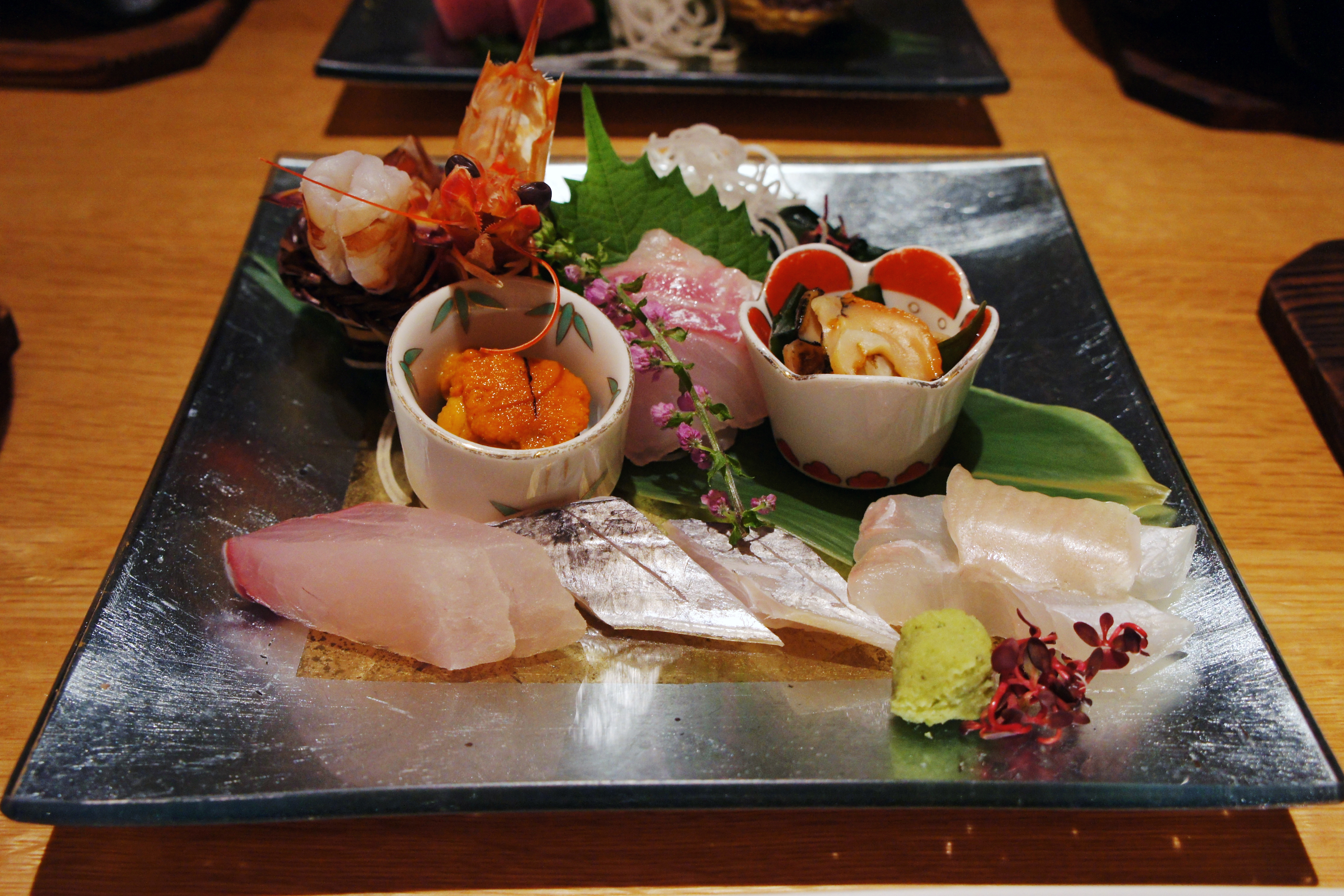
The Japanese sashimi is a raw dish, usually consisting of fresh raw fish.

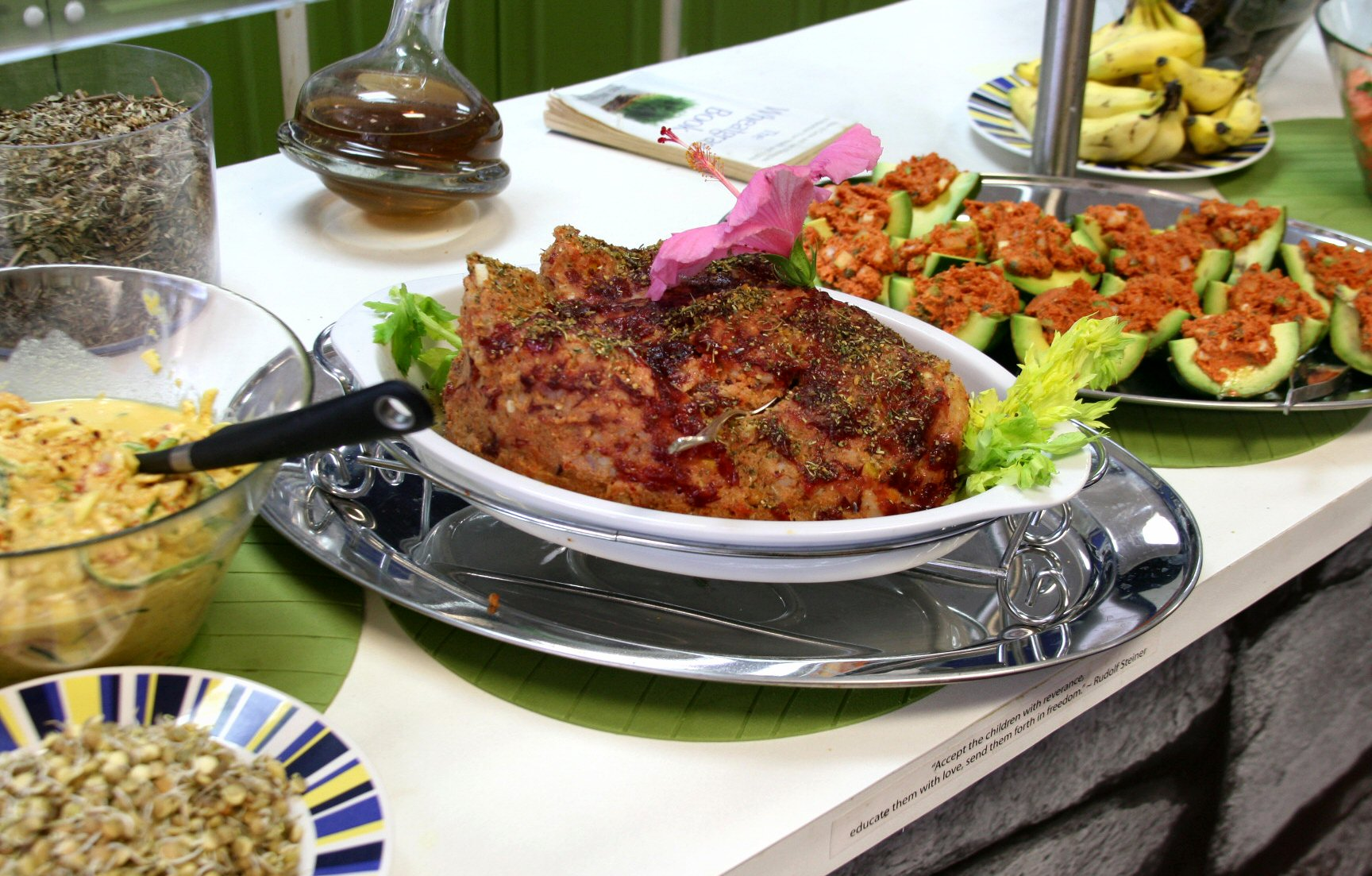
A raw vegan simulation of Thanksgiving Turkey.

Raw foodism, also known as rawism or a raw food diet, is the dietary practice of eating only or mostly food that is uncooked and unprocessed. Depending on the philosophy, lifestyle, and results desired, raw food diets may include a selection of fruits, vegetables, nuts, seeds, eggs, fish, meat, and dairy products. The diet may also include simply processed foods, such as various types of sprouted seeds, cheese, and fermented foods such as yogurts, kefir, kombucha, or sauerkraut, but generally not foods that have been pasteurized, homogenized, or produced with the use of synthetic pesticides, fertilizers, solvents, and food additives.

The British Dietetic Association has described raw foodism as a fad diet. Raw food diets, specifically raw veganism, may diminish intake of essential minerals and nutrients, such as vitamin B_{12}. Claims made by raw food proponents are pseudoscientific.

== Varieties ==
Raw food diets are diets composed entirely or mostly of food that is uncooked or that is cooked at low temperatures.

=== Raw animal food diets ===
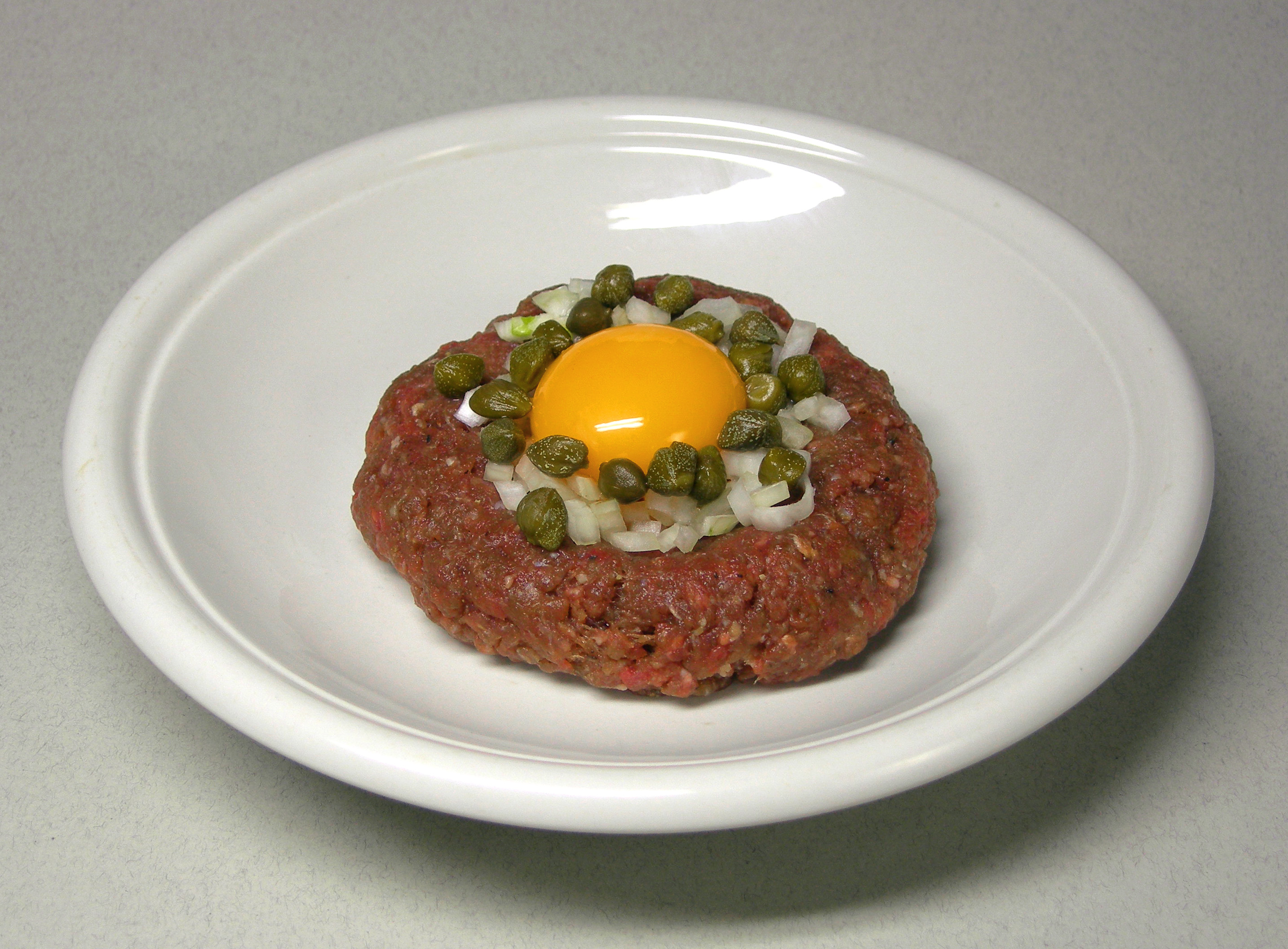
Steak tartare with raw egg, capers and onions

Raw animal food diets include any animal that can be eaten raw, such as uncooked, unprocessed raw muscle meats, organ meats, eggs, raw dairy, and aged, raw animal foods such as century eggs, fermented meat/fish/shellfish/kefir, as well as vegetables, fruits, nuts, and sprouts, but in general not raw grains, raw beans, and raw soy. Raw foods included in such diets have not been heated above 40 °C (104 °F). "Raw Animal Foodists" believe that foods cooked above this temperature have lost much of their nutritional value and are harmful to the body.

==== Diet examples ====
- The "People's Primal Potluck", anopsology (otherwise known as "instinctive eating"), and the "Raw Paleolithic Diet" (otherwise known as the "raw meat diet").
- The "primal diet" consists of fatty meats, organ meats, dairy, honey, minimal fruit and vegetable juices, and coconut products, all raw.
- The "raw Paleolithic diet", is a raw version of the (cooked) Palaeolithic diet, incorporating large amounts of raw animal foods such as meats/organ-meats, seafood, eggs, and some raw plant-foods, but usually avoiding non-Paleo foods such as raw dairy, grains, and legumes.

The founder of the Primal Diet is Aajonus Vonderplanitz, a resident of Malibu, California. Aajonus Vonderplanitz estimated that there are 20,000 followers of his raw-meat-heavy Primal Diet in North America alone.

- Aboriginal diets consisted of large quantities of raw meats, organ meats, and berries, including the traditional diet of the Nenets tribe of Siberia, and the Inuit.
- Pemmican is the traditional North American travel food, prepared from dried meat, fat, and berries.
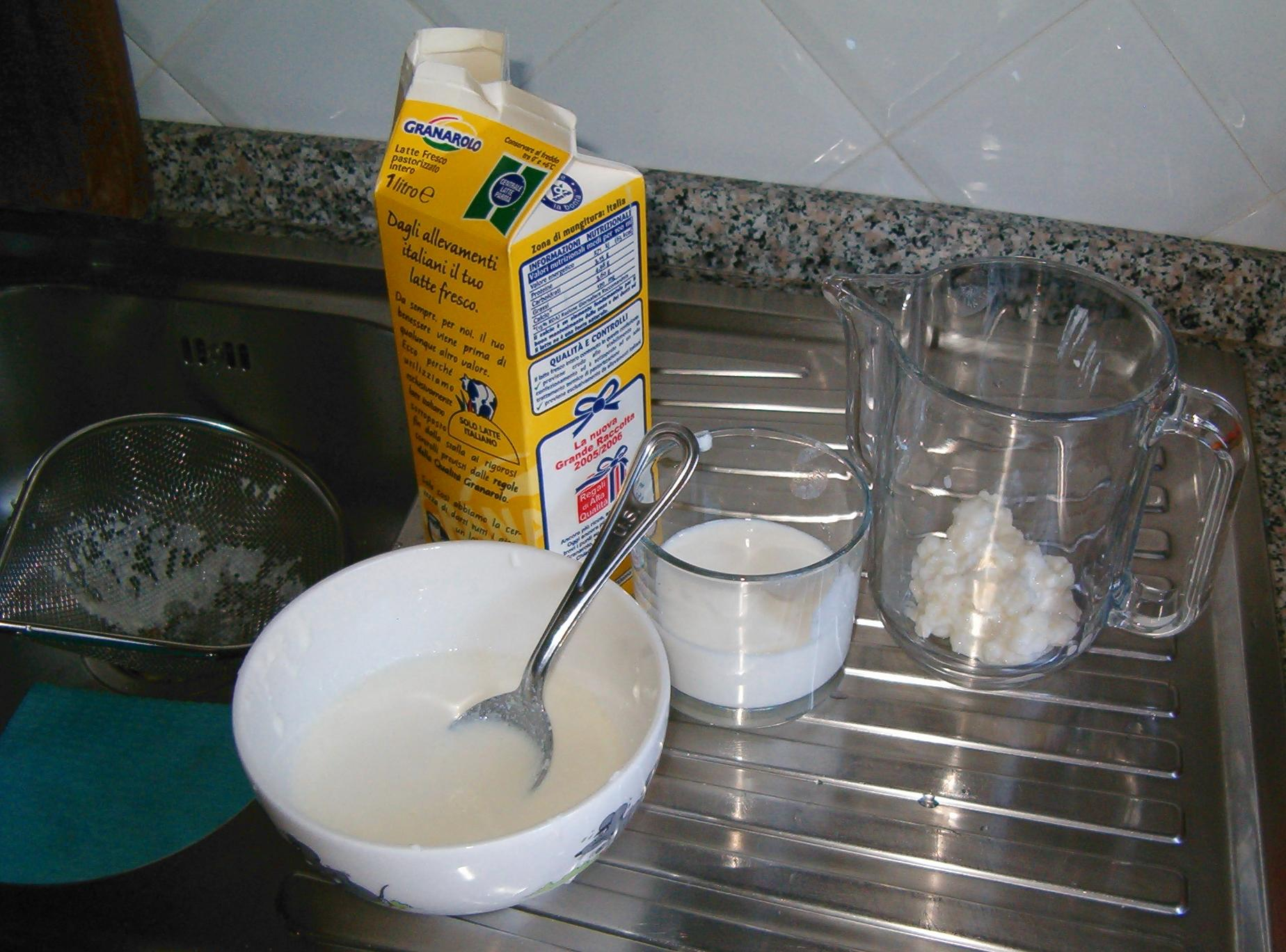
Kefir preparation

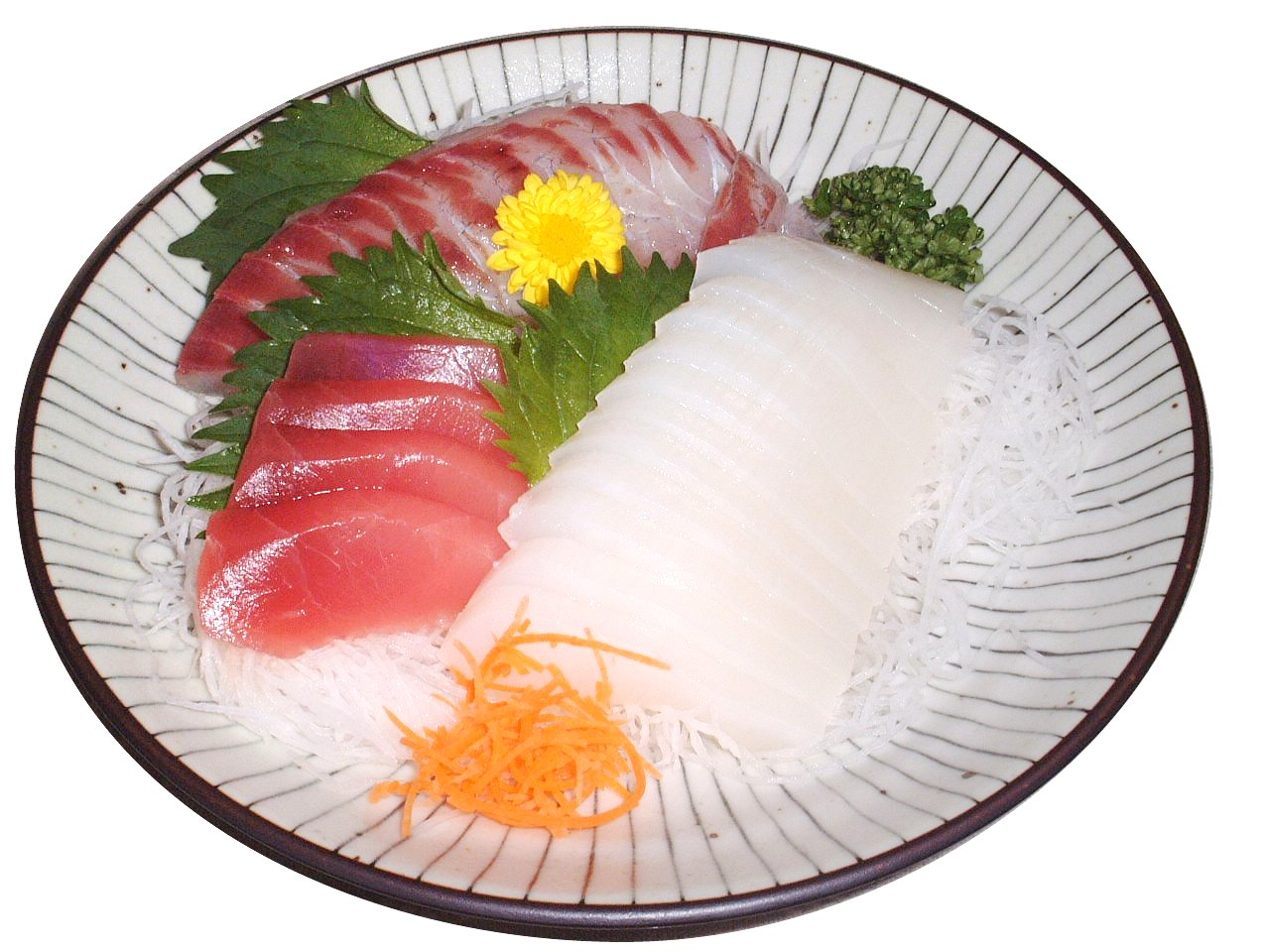
A sashimi dinner set

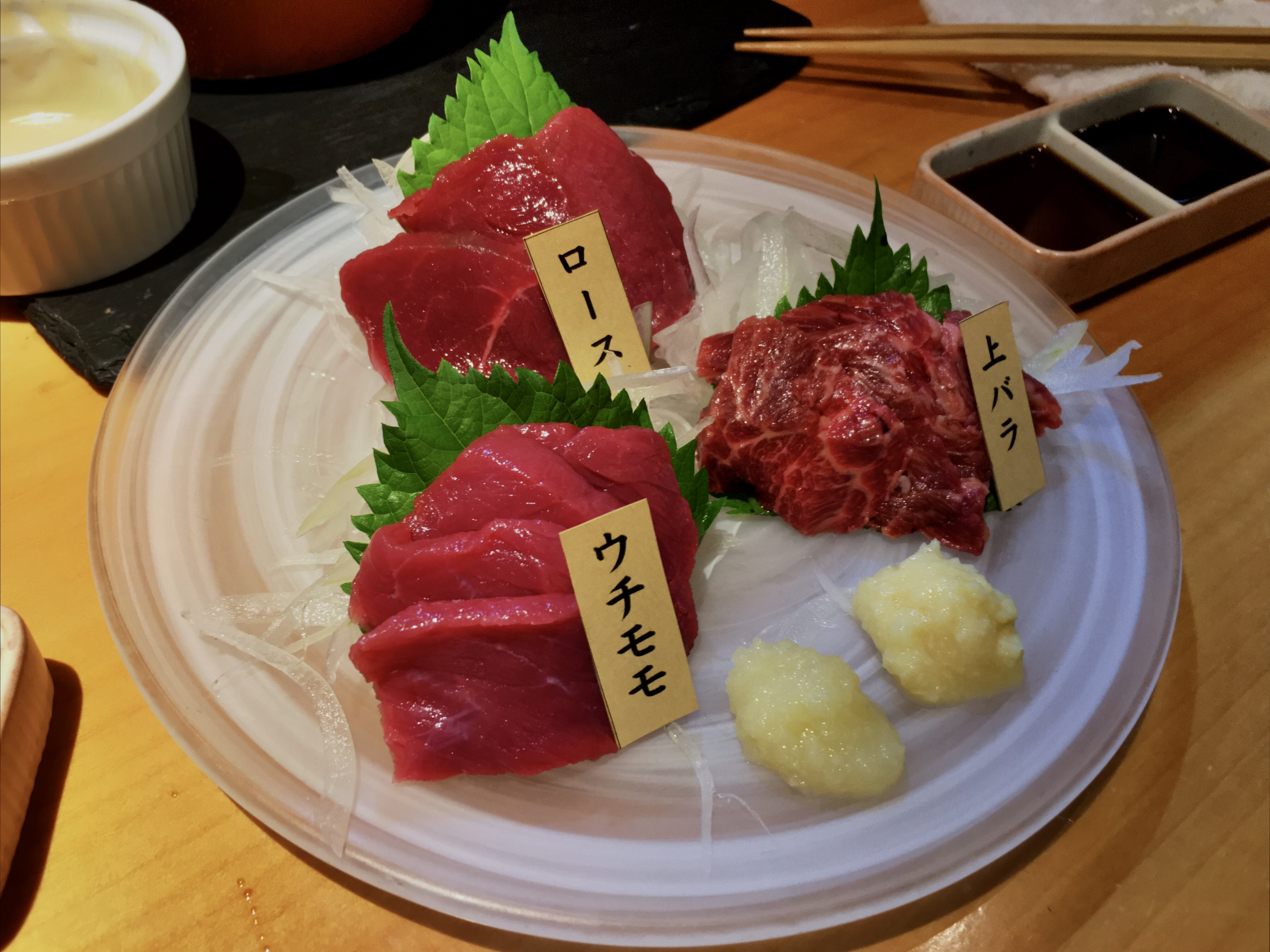
Raw horse meat set

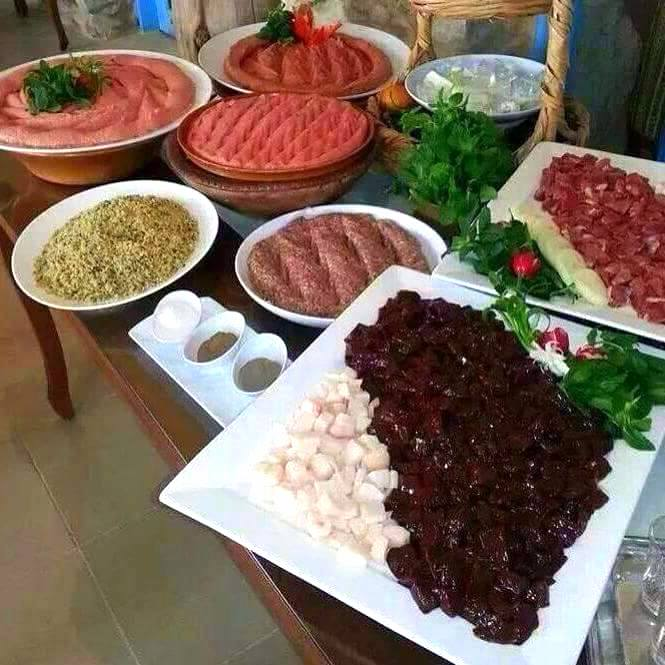
A variety of raw meat dishes in Aleppo, Syria, such as kibbeh nayyeh.

=== Raw veganism ===
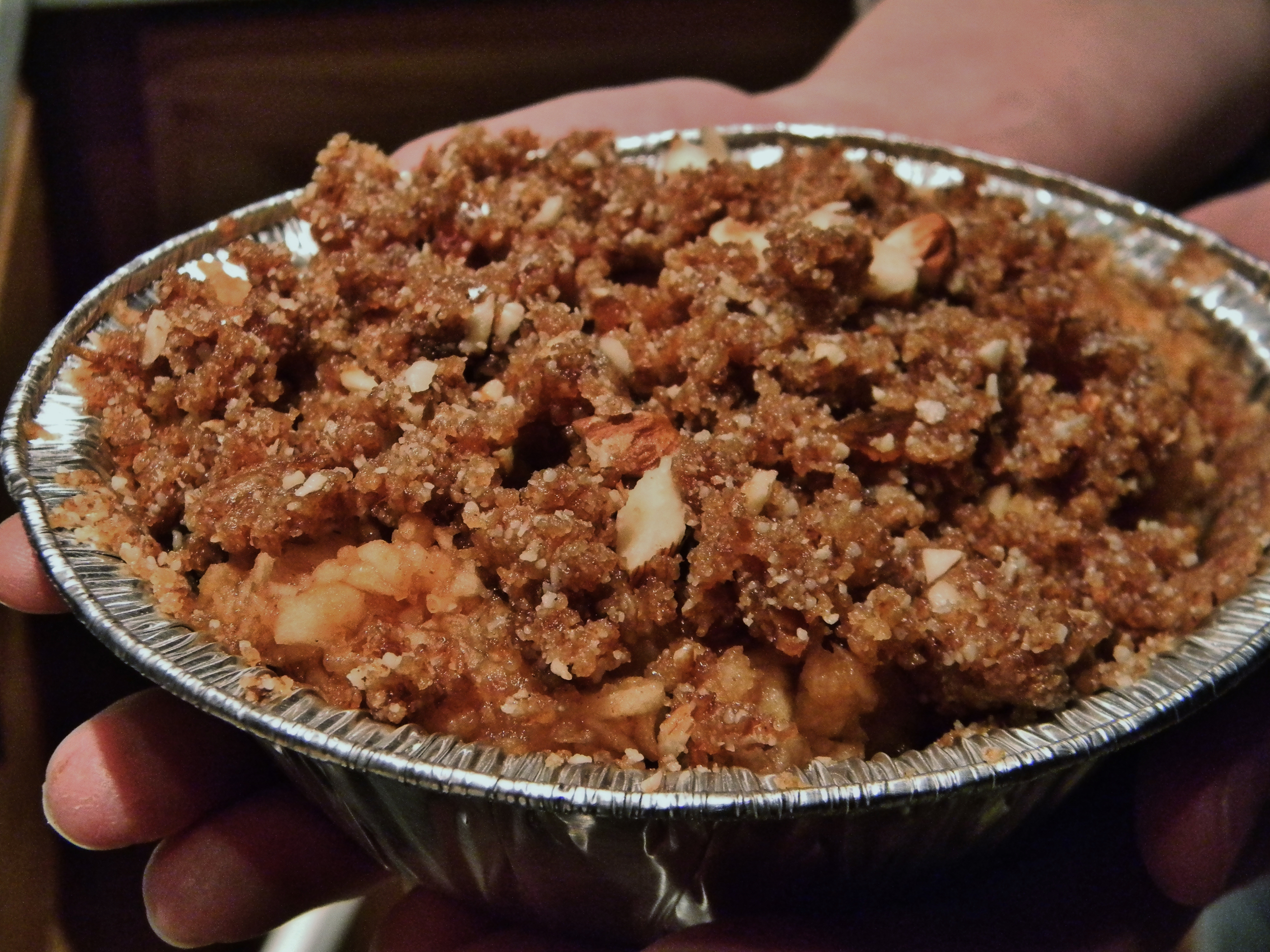
Raw vegan apple pie

Raw veganism has rarely been practised in history, but it became a fad in the 21st century. A raw vegan diet consists of unprocessed, raw plant foods that have not been heated above 40–49 °C (104–120 °F). Typical foods included in raw food diets are fruits, vegetables, nuts, seeds, and sprouted grains and legumes.

Among raw vegans are subgroups, such as "fruitarians", "juicearians", or "sproutarians". Fruitarians eat primarily or exclusively fruits, berries, seeds, and nuts. Juicearians process their raw plant foods into juice.

The British Dietetic Association named the raw vegan diet one of the "top 5 worst celeb diets to avoid in 2018", raising a concern that it could compromise long-term health.

== History ==
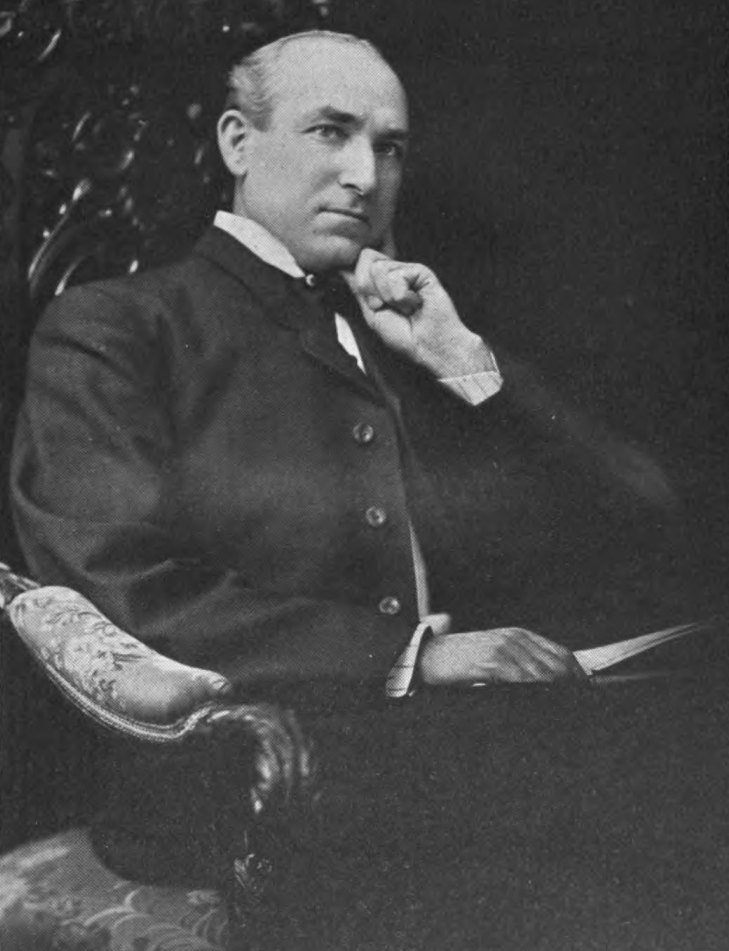
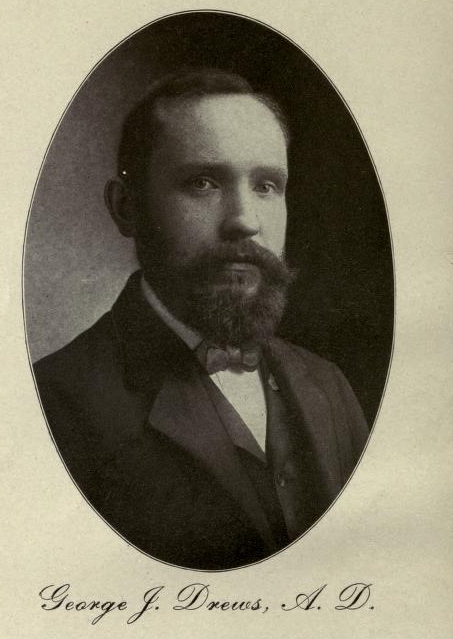
Eugene Christian and George J. Drews, founders of the American raw food movement

Early documentation of raw food dieting has been associated with hermits and monks practising asceticism. For example, John of Egypt, a hermit from the Nitrian Desert in the 4th Century, reportedly lived on a diet of dried fruit and vegetables for fifty years; he never ate anything cooked. Documented evidence of a commitment to raw food was by the Ethiopian monk Qozmos, who in the late 1300s CE committed to the ascetic discipline of eating only uncooked food. This posed a problem for his Ethiopian Orthodox Tewahedo Church monastery because he refused to eat the bread of the Eucharist, which is cooked. As a result, he fled the church and went to live with the Jewish community of the Beta Israel.

Contemporary raw food diets were first developed in Switzerland by Maximilian Bircher-Benner (1867–1939), who was influenced as a young man by the German Lebensreform movement, which saw civilization as corrupt and sought to go "back to nature"; it embraced holistic medicine, nudism, free love, regular exercise and other outdoors activity, and foods that it judged were more "natural". Bircher-Benner eventually adopted a vegetarian diet, but took that further and decided that raw food was what humans were really meant to eat; he was influenced by Charles Darwin's ideas that humans were just another kind of animal and Bircher-Benner noted that other animals do not cook their food. In 1904 he opened a sanatorium in the mountains outside of Zurich called "Lebendinge Kraft" or "Vital Force", a technical term in the Lebensreform movement that referred especially to sunlight; he and others believed that this energy was more "concentrated" in plants than in meat, and was diminished by cooking. Patients in the clinic were fed raw foods, including muesli, which was created there. These ideas were influential to Ann Wigmore, a notable raw food advocate, but were dismissed by scientists and the medical profession as quackery.

One of the earliest books to advocate raw foodism was Eugene Christian's Uncooked Foods and How to Use Them, 1904. Other proponents from the early part of the twentieth century include Californian fruit grower Otto Carque (author of The Foundation of All Reform, 1904), George Julius Drews (author of Unfired Food and Trophotherapy, 1912), Bernarr Macfadden and Herbert Shelton. Drews influenced John and Vera Richter to open America's first raw food restaurant, "The Eutropheon" in 1917.

Shelton was arrested, jailed, and fined numerous times for practising medicine without a license during his career as an advocate of rawism and other alternative health and diet philosophies. Shelton's legacy, as popularized by books like Fit for Life by Harvey and Marilyn Diamond, has been deemed "pseudonutrition" by the National Council Against Health Fraud.

In the 1970s, Norman W. Walker (inventor of the Norwalk Juicing Press) popularized raw food dieting. Leslie Kenton's book Raw Energy – Eat Your Way to Radiant Health, published in 1984, added popularity to foods such as sprouts, seeds, and fresh vegetable juices. The book advocates a diet of 75% raw food, which it claims will prevent degenerative diseases, slow the effects of aging, provide enhanced energy, and boost emotional balance; it cites examples such as the sprouted-seed-enriched diets of the long-lived Hunza people and Gerson therapy, an unhealthy, dangerous and potentially very harmful raw juice-based diet and detoxification regime claimed to treat cancer.

In the 21st century, raw food diets (particularly those focused on raw milk, raw eggs, and raw meat) have been popularized and politicized as part of a broader "right-wing bodybuilder" movement centered around hypermasculinity, physical fitness, fascination with ancient civilizations, and opposition to feminism and mainstream modern culture.

== Claims ==
Claims held by raw food proponents include:

- That heating food above 104–118 °F (40–48 °C) degrades enzymes in raw food that aid digestion. Enzymes in food play no significant role in the digestive process before being digested themselves.
- That raw foods have higher nutrient values than foods that have been cooked. In fact, cooking has widely variable results on nutritional content, depending on the plant source and cooking method, and may increase the availability of fat-based nutrients, such as vitamin E and beta-carotene.
- That foods cooked at high temperatures, especially meat, may contain harmful toxins, including trans fatty acids produced by heating oil, acrylamide produced by frying, advanced glycation end products (AGEs), and polycyclic aromatic hydrocarbons. Not all cooked food contains harmful chemicals, and a diet containing a mix of cooked and raw food is normal. According to the American Cancer Society, it is not clear as of 2019 whether acrylamide consumption affects the risk of cancer. Public health authorities recommend reducing consumption of overly-cooked starchy foods or meats.

== Health effects ==
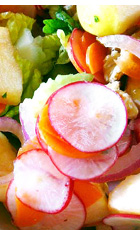
A close-up of a raw food dish

A raw food diet may impair the development of children and infants. Careful planning is essential for a raw vegan diet, particularly for children, as there may not be enough vitamin B_{12}, vitamin D, and calories for a growing child on a totally raw vegan diet.

Food poisoning is a health risk for anyone consuming raw food. One review stated that "Many raw foods are toxic and only become safe after they have been cooked. Some raw foods contain substances that affect the absorption of nutrients, interfere with digestive enzymes, or damage the walls of the intestine. Additionally, raw meat can be contaminated with bacteria which would be destroyed by cooking; raw fish can contain substances that interfere with vitamin B1 ( anti-thiaminases)".

== See also ==
- Amílcar de Sousa, 20th century raw foodist
- Béla Bicsérdy
- Bernando LaPallo
- Cooking
- Fruitarianism
- Green smoothie
- List of diets
- Orthopathy
- Category:Raw foodists
- Rejuvelac
- Taboo food and drink
- Xerophagy, a form of fasting
- Liver King, an internet influencer known for eating raw meat and organs
- Raw water
