= George J. Drews =

German American writer and naturopath

George Julius Drews
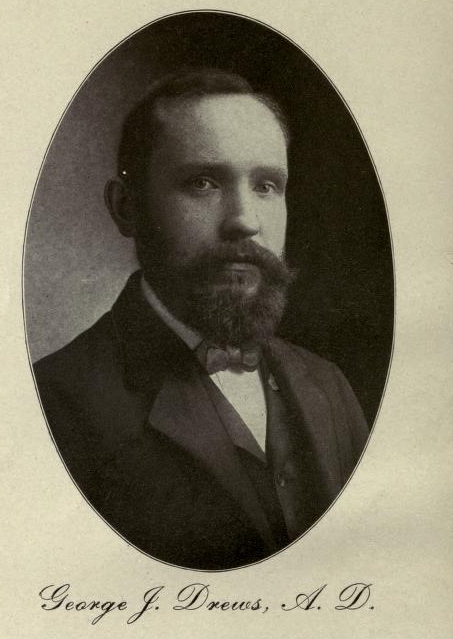
- Born: January 20, 1873; Germany
- Died: October 17, 1945 (aged 72); Chicago
- Occupation(s): Naturopath, writer

George Julius Drews (January 20, 1873 - October 17, 1945) was a German American naturopath and writer associated with the natural hygiene and raw food movements.

== Biography ==
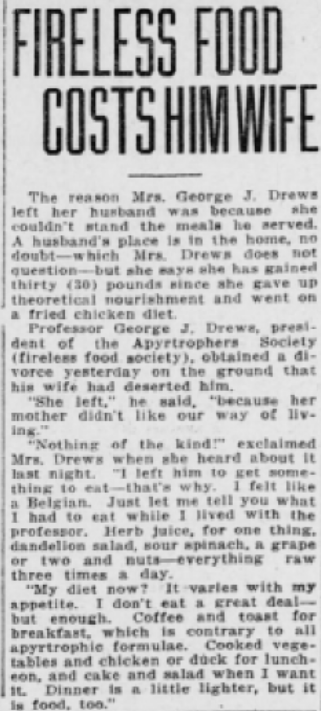
Chicago Examiner (June 11, 1915)

Drews was one of the pioneers of the raw foodism movement in America. Drews authored the vegetarian raw food book Unfired Food and Tropho-Therapy in 1912. The book was reprinted ten times by 1927. Drews argued that mans natural diet should consist of uncooked fruits, cereals, herbs, nuts and roots. A negative review in the Medical Advance journal commented that "we are unable to find any proofs of the position taken, no experiments are offered by which conclusions may be reached, and arguments upon a logical basis are not present."

Drews invented a Greek-based nomenclature for his raw foodism and founded the Apyrtropher Society in Chicago. He utilized the term "Apyrtrophy" for his raw food philosophy. He hosted lectures and meetings about Apyrtrophy. His agenda was to convert people to eating only uncooked food, spread the practice of eating vegetables in their natural state and oppose the use of the gas stove. It was described as a cult by critics.

Drews opposed the consumption of eggs and meat, but was not a vegan. In his book Unfired Food and Tropho-Therapy he wrote that "milk is only naturally beneficial and wholesome for emaciated adults when it has become curdled. A cup of churned thick milk or buttermilk along with a dish of green salad may be served to convalescents with good results."

Drews influenced John and Vera Richter to open America's first raw food restaurant "The Eutropheon" in 1917.

He was the owner of Apyrtropher Magazine.

== Personal life ==
Drews married Elizabeth Bristle in September, 1911. She originally weighed 119 pounds which was a fair weight for her stature. Influenced by Drews, she embraced a strict raw food diet and a daily menu plan that he had created. The diet consisted of fruit juice, water, vegetable salads, nuts, fruit, herbs, honey and raw potatoes. Her weight decreased to only 105 pounds. Bristle complained that she was losing too much weight and she was feeling ill.

Bristle described Drews as a "crank on the matter of food", he also tried to convert her to "back to nature" ideas, including nudism. Bristle went back to live with her mother Katharina who was concerned about her health. She weighed 135 pounds on her mother's cooking, ate the occasional piece of steak and enjoyed wholesome cooked vegetables. Drews denied that his daily menu of raw food made his wife ill. They divorced in June, 1915.

== Selected publications ==
- Unfired Foods and Hygienic Dietetics (1909)
- Unfired Food and Tropho-Therapy (1912)
- The Improved Mono-Diet (1921)
