= Ann Wigmore =

American holistic health practitioner (1909–1994)

- Born: March 4, 1909
- Died: February 16, 1994 (aged 84); Boston, Massachusetts
- Occupations: Raw food advocate and writer

Ann Wigmore (March 4, 1909 – February 16, 1994) was a Lithuanian–American holistic health practitioner, naturopath and raw food advocate.

Influenced by the 'back to nature' theories of Maximilian Bircher-Benner, she maintained that plants concentrated more solar energy ('Vital Force') than animals, and that wheatgrass could detoxify the body. She also deplored food additives. Although the Ann Wigmore Foundation received accreditation as a non-profit, many of her claims were denounced as quackery, and her qualifications were never confirmed to be genuine.

== Historical context ==
Wigmore was inspired in part by the ideas of Maximilian Bircher-Benner (1867–1939), who was influenced as a young man by the German Lebensreform movement, which saw civilization as corrupt and which sought to go "back to nature"; it embraced holistic medicine, nudism, various forms of spirituality, free love, exercise and other outdoors activity, and foods that it judged were more "natural". Bircher-Benner eventually adopted a vegetarian diet, but took that further and decided that raw food was what humans were really meant to eat. He was influenced by Charles Darwin's ideas that humans were just another kind of animal, noting that other animals do not cook their food.

In 1904, Bircher-Benner opened a sanatorium in the mountains outside of Zurich called "Lebendige Kraft" or "Vital Force," a technical term in the Lebensreform movement that referred especially to sunlight; he and others believed that this energy was more "concentrated" in plants than in meat, and was diminished by cooking. Patients in the clinic were fed raw foods, including muesli which was created there. While these ideas were dismissed by scientists and the medical profession of his day as quackery, they gained a following in some quarters.

== Career ==
Wigmore was one of the first to popularize these ideas about raw food in the US. She was inspired by the biblical story of King Nebuchadnezzar, recounted in Daniel 4:33, in which "he was driven from men, and did eat grass as oxen, and his body was wet with the dew of heaven, till his hairs were grown like eagles' feathers, and his nails like birds' claws", and by the examples of dogs eating grass when they were unwell. She also said that she learned about herbs and natural remedies as a child in Lithuania, watching her grandmother.

In the 1940s, Wigmore started promoting the benefits of wheatgrass and other raw foods in order to "detox", removing what she considered to be poisons of "unnatural" cooked foods and food additives added by industrial society; she believed this diet allowed and helped the body to heal itself. She believed that fresh wheatgrass juice and fresh vegetables - and especially chlorophyll - retained more of their original energy and potency (a form of vitalism) if they were uncooked and eaten as soon as possible after harvesting them.

According to the National Council against Healthcare Fraud: "Wigmore claimed to have a Doctor of Divinity (DD) from the College of Divine Metaphysics in Indianapolis. She also listed a Doctor of Philosophy (PhD) and a Doctor of Naturopathy (ND) degree at different times. None of her credentials appear to have been from accredited schools."

=== Hippocrates Health Institute ===
During the mid-1960s, Wigmore, as "Reverend Ann Wigmore", and Rising Sun Christianity, Inc., which she controlled, bought property at 25 Exeter Street in Boston's Back Bay, where she lived and where Rising Sun had offices, as carved into its glass and door. She also founded The Ann Wigmore Foundation Inc., which received accreditation as a nonprofit from the IRS in 1970. In 1974, Rising Sun Christianity applied to the city to convert the building into a church, a holistic school, and apartments, which was granted for five years, and was extended in 1980.

In 1982, the Rising Sun Church acquired the building next door, and changed its name to the Hippocrates Health Institute, Inc. She was sued in 1982 by the attorney general of Massachusetts for promoting a cure for diabetes and for claiming that she could make it unnecessary for children to be vaccinated; she stopped making those claims after losing in court.

Brian Clement obtained control over the Hippocrates Health Institute and moved it from Boston to West Palm Beach, Florida, in 1987. Clement, of the Hippocrates Health Institute, eventually obtained 60 acres of land in West Palm Beach and have become known offering residents wheatgrass, IV injections of vitamins, dietary supplements, foot baths to remove "toxins," raw foods diets and alternative cancer treatments.

=== Ann Wigmore Natural Health Institute ===
Wigmore founded the Ann Wigmore Natural Health Institute Inc in Puerto Rico, where people could go for alternative medicine or to be trained in her methods. The Foundation moved to New Mexico after Wigmore's death; it lost IRS accreditation as a nonprofit in 2012.

=== National Humane League ===
Wigmore was the founder and president of the National Humane League, an animal welfare organization. The organization was dedicated to the "spreading of information covering the nourishment, housing and care of God-guided creatures". She authored the book, Our Precious Pets: God Made Them For Love, published in 1987.

== Reception ==
Wigmore was an advocate of astrology, spiritual healing, and other pseudoscientific beliefs. She held the erroneous view that the chlorophyll in wheatgrass detoxifies the body and has healing power. Her claims with regard to wheatgrass have been described as quackery.

In 1980, the US House of Representatives Select Committee on Aging began what became a four-year investigation into health care scams that preyed on older people. Their findings were published in 1984 in a report titled "Quackery, a $10 Billion Scandal", commonly referred to as "The Pepper Report" after committee chairman Claude Pepper.

The committee received testimony from a woman desperate to treat her husband's cancer who accepted treatment from Steven and Ellen Haasz, disciples of Wigmore, and eventually from Wigmore's facility in Boston, instead of standard care which the Haaszes strongly discouraged from her pursuing. She said: "I know now that I was foolish to listen to Haasz and to spend about $2,000, including the trip to Boston, on the raw food things. But my husband and I were married for 37 years and when he got sick, I was looking for magic. Their false promise of hope may have actually shortened my husband's few numbered days on this Earth."

Wigmore was sued by the Massachusetts Attorney-General's department in 1988 for publishing pamphlets falsely claiming to offer an AIDS cure. She claimed that AIDS arises from "the body's inability to assimilate the food consumed" and for around $400 (about $700 in 2016) sold lessons to make an "energy enzyme soup" that she said allowed an infected person's body to completely clear the virus. She was acquitted under the First Amendment as the claims were deemed not to be commercial claims made in trade, but was ordered not to misrepresent herself as a doctor qualified to treat illness or disease.

Health educator William T. Jarvis has noted that:

In 1988, the Massachusetts Attorney General sued Wigmore for claiming that her "energy enzyme soup" could cure AIDS. Suffolk County Judge Robert A. Mulligan ruled that Wigmore's views on how to combat AIDS were protected by the First Amendment, but ordered her to stop representing herself as a physician or as a person licensed in any way to treat disease. This was not the first time Wigmore had run afoul of the law. In 1982, the Attorney General of Massachusetts sued Wigmore for claiming that her program could reduce or eliminate the need for insulin in diabetics, and could obviate the need for routine immunization in children. She abandoned those claims after losing in court.

== Personal life ==
On December 25, 1930, Anna Marie (again under the name "Warap" per wedding coverage Stoughton News-Sentinel, 1 Jan 1931) married Everett Arnold Wigmore (1907–1969), of Stoughton, Massachusetts, where they lived during their marriage. Her husband was in the family stone masonry business. A daughter, Wilma Edith Wigmore, was born on July 9, 1941. On January 12, 1942, Wigmore became a United States citizen.

Wigmore died in Boston on February 16, 1994, of smoke inhalation from a fire on the third floor of the Ann Wigmore Foundation mansion at 196 Commonwealth Avenue. She had been making tea in the kitchen when the fire erupted. Wigmore had written about twenty five books and had lectured on her ideas in the US, Canada, and Europe.

== Selected publications ==
- Recipes for Longer Life: Ann Wigmore's Famous Recipes for Rejuvenation and Freedom from Degenerative Diseases (1982)
- The Hippocrates Diet and Health Program: A Natural Diet and Health Program for Weight Control, Disease Prevention (1983)
- The Wheatgrass Book: How to Grow and Use Wheatgrass to Maximize Your Health and Vitality (1985)
- The Sprouting Book: How to Grow and Use Sprouts to Maximize Your Health and Vitality (1986)
- Our Precious Pets: God Made Them For Love (1987)

== See also ==
- Big Pharma conspiracy theory
- Complementary and alternative medicine
