= Doris Grant =

British nutritionist and food writer (1905 – 2003)

- Born: Doris Margaret Louise Cruikshank; 25 January 1905; Banff, Aberdeenshire
- Died: 27 February 2003 (aged 98); Stevenage
- Education: Banff Academy, Glasgow School of Art
- Occupations: nutritionist, food writer
- Known for: inventor of the wartime Grant loaf
- Notable work: The Hay System Menu Book
- Spouse: Gordon Grant (m. 1927)

Doris Margaret Louise Grant, née Cruikshank (25 January 1905 – 27 February 2003) was a British nutritionist and food writer, the inventor of the wartime Grant loaf.

== Life ==
Grant was born in Banff, Aberdeenshire on 25 January 1905 to William and Adeline Cruickshank. She was educated first at Banff Academy, and then attended the Glasgow School of Art where she had won a scholarship to study in Rome as the top student of the year. however the scholarship was removed after she had become engaged to her future husband Gordon Grant. Grant married on 8 November 1927 and soon afterwards moved to London, where her husband Gordon Grant set up the new London office for his family firm, William Grant, the distillers.

Grant suffered with chronic indigestion and rheumatoid arthritis, but discovered that the Hay diet helped to alleviate the symptoms. She became a passionate believer in the diet, and after advocating for it in a series of articles in Sunday Graphic, she was visited by William Howard Hay, the developer of the diet, who asked her to create a recipe for British tastes. The book, The Hay System Menu Book, was published in 1937.

Over many years Grant championed the use of fresh and natural ingredients along with minimising the amount of processing in our food. In doing so she ran a long campaign against many of the major food companies by continually criticising the overuse of refined carbohydrates, especially in the manufacture of white bread and sugar.

She and her husband retired to Poole, Dorset in 1962, where they often sailed in the English Channel in their yacht. She remained active in matters pertaining to nutrition and diet for the rest of her life. Doris Grant died in Stevenage of heart disease at the age of 98 on 27 February 2003.

== Grant loaf ==
Grant discovered the secret for the loaf, which was subsequently named after her, by accident when she realised that she had forgotten to knead the wholemeal dough she was making, and found it to have a superior taste to its kneaded counterparts. The bread was subsequently promoted as a way of encouraging wartime wives to eat well on their rations.

== Works ==
- Doris Grant (1937), The Hay System Menu Book, London:Harrap
- Doris Grant (1942), Feeding the Family in Wartime,
- Doris Grant (1944), Your Daily Bread. London:Faber & Faber
- Doris Grant (1956), Dear Housewives, London:Faber & Faber
- Doris Grant (1973), Your Daily Food. London:Faber & Faber
- Doris Grant with Jean Joice (1984), Food Combining for Health,
- Doris Grant (1995)"Food Combining for life: the health success of the century"
- Grant, Doris; Joice, Jean (24 November 2016). Food Combining for Health. HarperCollins UK. ISBN 978-0-00-737391-8.
