= Alsaker (surname) =

Alsaker is a surname. Notable people with the surname include:

- Øyvind Alsaker (born 1965), Norwegian sports journalist and television personality
- Paal Christian Alsaker (born 1973), Norwegian footballer
- Rasmus Larssen Alsaker (1883–1960), Norwegian-born American physician and alternative health writer
- Svein Alsaker (born 1940), Norwegian politician
