= Fit for Life =

Book series

- 1985 edition cover
- Author: Marilyn Diamond; Harvey Diamond
- Language: English
- Genre: Diet & Lifestyle
- Publication date: 1985
- Publication place: United States
- ISBN: 0-446-30015-2
- Followed by: Living Health (1987)

Fit for Life is a diet and lifestyle book series stemming from the principles of orthopathy. It is promoted mainly by the American writers Harvey and Marilyn Diamond. The Fit for Life book series describes a diet which specifies eating only fruit in the morning, eating predominantly "live" and "high-water-content" food, and, if animal protein is eaten, avoiding combining it with complex carbohydrates.

While the diet has been praised for encouraging the consumption of raw fruits and vegetables, several other aspects of the diet have been disputed by dietitians and nutritionists, and the American Dietetic Association and the American Academy of Family Physicians list it as a fad diet. Health experts and science writers have dismissed the book as quackery.

== Description ==
The diet is based on Diamond's exploration of Herbert M. Shelton theories of food combining. Both authors claimed to be able to bring about weight loss without the need to count calories or undertake anything more than a reasonable exercise program. In the first version of the program, Diamond claimed that if one eats the foods in the wrong combination they "cause fermentation" in the stomach. This in turn gives rise to the destruction of valuable enzymes and nutrients. Diamond categorized foods into two groups: "dead foods" that "clog" the body, and "living foods" that "cleanse" it. According to Fit for Life principles, dead foods are those that have highly refined or highly processed origins; while living foods are raw fruits and vegetables. The basic points of Fit for Life are as follows:

- Fruits are best eaten fresh and raw. Where possible they should be eaten alone.
- Carbohydrates and proteins should never be combined in the same meal.
- Water dilutes stomach digestive juices and should never be drunk at meals.
- Dairy products are considered of limited value and because of their allergic capacity, should seldom, if ever, be eaten.

In the 2000s, the Fit for Life system added the Personalized Fit for Life Weight Management Program, which employs proprietary protocols called Biochemical "Analyzation", Metabolic Typing and Genetic Predispositions. The Diamonds claim that these protocols allow the personalization of the diet, which thus customized is effective only for one individual, and can be used for that person's entire life. This version of the diet also puts less emphasis on "live" and "dead" foods, and instead talks of "enzyme deficient foods". The Diamonds posit that enzymes that digest proteins interfere with enzymes that digest carbohydrates, justifying some of the rules above. They also began to sell nutritional supplements, advertised as enzyme supplements, many of which are strongly recommended in the newest version of Fit for Life.

=== Credentials ===
The rigor of study underlying Harvey Diamond's credentials have been disputed, which has drawn questions about his competence to write about nutrition, because his doctoral degree came from the American College of Life Science, a non-accredited correspondence school founded in 1982 by T.C. Fry, who did not graduate high school or undergo a formal accreditation process himself. Fit for Life's personalized diet program has been criticized for providing a "Clinical Manual" that is heavily infused with alternative medicine claims about how the body works, some of which may be scientifically inaccurate or not accepted by conventional medicine.

=== Clinical trials ===
Despite the fact that the Fit for Life web site mentioned "clinical trials", many of the proposed principles and benefits of the Fit for Life diet are not supported by citations to any scholarly research, and some of the claims have actually been directly refuted by scientific research. For example, a dissociated diet as that advertised by Fit for Life is as effective for weight loss as a calorie-restricted diet.

== Publications and marketing ==
The diet came to public attention in the mid-1980s with the publication of Fit for Life, a New York Times best seller which sold millions of copies, over 12 million according to Harvey Diamond. Harvey Diamond has also appeared on dozens of television talk shows promoting his theories. In Fit for Life II (1989) the Diamonds warned against eating artificial food additives such as hydrogenated vegetable oil, which at the time was being promoted by the food industry as a healthy alternative to saturated fat. Tony Robbins promoted the Fit for Life principles and veganism to increase energy levels in his book Unlimited Power.

=== Book series ===
- Fit for Life (1985) - by Harvey and Marilyn Diamond ISBN 0-446-30015-2
- Living Health (1987) - by Harvey and Marilyn Diamond ISBN 0-446-51281-8
- Fit for Life II (1989) - by Harvey and Marilyn Diamond ISBN 0-446-35875-4
- Fit for Life: A New Beginning (2001) - by Harvey Diamond ISBN 1-57566-718-5
- Fit for Life Not Fat For Life (2003) - by Harvey Diamond ISBN 978-0-7573-0113-1
- Living Without Pain (2007) - by Harvey Diamond ISBN 0-9769961-0-3

=== Additional books by Marilyn Diamond ===
- A New Way of Eating from the Fit for Life Kitchen (1987)
- The American Vegetarian Cookbook from the Fit for Life Kitchen (1990)
- The Fit for Life Cookbook (1991)
- Fitonics for Life (1996) with Donald Burton Schnell
- Recipes for Life (1998) with Lisa Neurith
- Young For Life (2013) with Donald Burton Schnell

== See also ==
- Raw veganism
- Dr. Hay diet
- Alkaline diet
- List of diets
