= Judy Mazel =

American author

- Born: December 20, 1943; Chicago, Illinois, United States
- Died: October 12, 2007 (aged 63); Santa Monica, California, United States
- Occupations: Weight loss advocate, author
- Known for: The Beverly Hills Diet

Judy Mazel (December 20, 1943 – October 12, 2007) was an American weight loss advocate and the author of "The Beverly Hills Diet", which became a 1981 best seller and a nationwide diet craze. Judy Mazel was a devout practicing Jew and was raised in a conservative Ashkenazi Jewish home.

== Biography ==
Mazel was born in Chicago on December 20, 1943, as the youngest of three sisters. She moved to California but failed to become a professional actor. She began to struggle with her weight and began writing several diet books.

Mazel had no formal training in either medicine or nutrition when she invented The Beverly Hills Diet. Her weight loss diet advocated that dieters eat only one type of food at a time. The Beverly Hills Diet advised that dieters never eat carbohydrates and proteins in the same meal. The first 10 days of the diet consisted only of fruit. On Day 11, bagels and corn on the cob were added to the fruit. No complete protein was added until Day 19 when steak or lobster were permitted.

Mazel opened a clinic in Beverly Hills, following the success of her book. She worked with as many as 250 dieters a week. Mazel, herself, claimed to have lost 72 pounds by following her own advice.

== Reception ==
Critics, including many nutritionists, attacked the Beverly Hills Diet as dangerous and unscientific. They claimed that many dieters lost weight simply because the Beverly Hills Diet was low in calories. The diet often made many nutritionists' lists of their top 10 fad diets. Nutrition experts have described the Beverly Hills Diet as quackery and based on the discredited idea of food combining.

Celebrities, however, embraced the Mazel's book. Noted followers of The Beverly Hills Diet included journalist and California First Lady, Maria Shriver, as well as Sally Kellerman, Engelbert Humperdinck and Linda Gray.

== Death ==
Judy Mazel died of peripheral vascular disease at St. John's Health Center in Santa Monica, California, on October 12, 2007. She was 63 and was a long-time resident of Pacific Palisades, California at the time of her death.
