= Hay diet =

Scientifically unsupported diet

The Hay Diet is a nutrition method developed by the New York physician William Howard Hay in the 1920s. It claims to work by separating food into three groups: alkaline, acidic, and neutral. (Hay's use of these terms does not completely conform to the scientific use, i.e., the pH of the foods.) Acidic foods are not combined with the alkaline ones. Acidic foods are protein rich, such as meat, fish, dairy, etc. Alkaline foods are carbohydrate rich, such as rice, grains and potatoes. It is also known as the food combining diet.

A similar theory, called nutripathy, was developed by Gary A. Martin in the 1970s. Others who have promulgated alkaline-acid diets include Edgar Cayce, Luigi Costacurta, D. C. Jarvis, and Robert O. Young.

== History ==
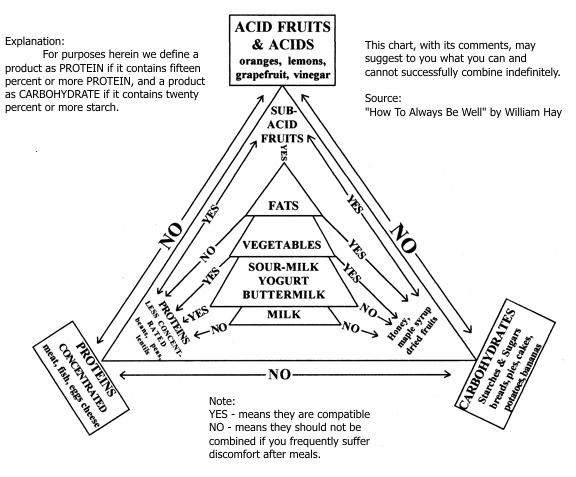
Chart from How to Always Be Well (1967), by William Howard Hay

In 1905, Hay purported to have had an episode of acute heart failure following a sprint towards a train. As a result he discovered that he had Bright's disease (hypertension with nephritis) with a dilated heart, a condition with a poor prognosis at the time. Hay started looking for ways to improve his condition. He first turned to a vegetarian diet and restricted his eating to once a day in the evening. Then he gave up coffee and a few months later he quit smoking tobacco. After three months of the new regimen his weight had dropped from 225 lbs. to 175 lbs. and he noticed improvements in his health. Motivated by this experience, Hay spent the following decade studying naturopathy, orthopathy and food combining in efforts to reduce as he termed it "the vast quantities of acid waste that result from wrong selection and combination of the daily foods". He claimed that fruits and vegetables produced alkaline 'end-products' when they were metabolized, while processed and refined foods resulted in acidic 'end-products' after digestion. His theories went on to encompass food-combining; stating that incorrect combinations of foods would cause even alkaline foods to leave a less desirable acidic digestion end-product.

Any carbohydrate foods require alkaline conditions for their complete digestion, so must not be combined with acids of any kind, as sour fruits, because the acid will neutralise. Neither should these be combined with a protein of concentrated sort as these protein foods will excite too much hydrochloric acid during their stomach digestion.

— William Hay, How to Always Be Well

The Hay System promoted eating three meals per day with meal one being what the diet considers to be alkaline foods only, meal two composed of what the diet considers to be protein foods with salads, vegetables and fruit, and meal three composed of what the diet considers to be starchy foods with salads, vegetables and sweet fruit; with an interval of 4.0 to 4.5 hours between each meal. The Hay diet was popular in the 1930s and many restaurants offered 'Hay-friendly' menus; followers of his dietary advice included Henry Ford and Man Ray. In this period Hay was criticized in the Journal of the American Medical Association (JAMA) as a food-faddist and separately for advocating that a patient with type 1 diabetes on the Hay diet should stop taking insulin. In 1935, Stewart Baxter showed that the pancreas secretes digestion enzymes simultaneously regardless of whether the food eaten is carbohydrates or protein, contrary to one of the central propositions of the diet.

Currently, the theory that carbohydrate and protein rich foods should be eaten separately is considered "unfounded" because it ignores the fact that carbohydrate rich foods contain significant amounts of protein. Eating protein separately from carbohydrates also tends to cause the body to burn the protein as an energy source rather than to build muscle. Nevertheless, despite continual criticism over lack of a scientific basis, the Hay diet and its variants, such as the Kensington diet and the Beverly Hills Diet, remain popular, with actors such as Elizabeth Hurley, Helen Mirren and Catherine Zeta-Jones following food-combining diets.

== Studies ==
The food-combining diet has been the subject of one peer-reviewed randomized clinical trial, which found no benefit from the diet in terms of weight loss.

== See also ==
- Food combining
- Alkaline diet
- Fit for Life
- List of diets
