= William Howard Hay =

American physician

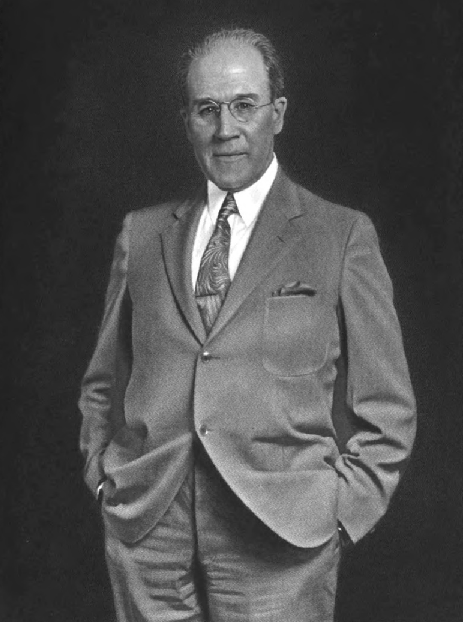
- Hay in 1934
- Born: December 14, 1866; Hartstown, Pennsylvania
- Died: 1940 (aged 73–74)
- Occupations: Physician, writer

William Howard Hay (December 14, 1866 – 1940) was an American physician and director of The East Aurora Sun and Diet Sanatorium. He is principally known for the 'Hay diet', a food-combining dietary system.

== Career ==
Hay graduated from the New York University Medical College in 1891 and was licensed in Pennsylvania. Following graduation he practiced in Youngsville, and was the surgeon for the American Tinplate Company of New Castle. While he was in Pennsylvania he set-up the Hay Rest Cure which was advertised as "a special service department for the cure of hay fever cases". In 1905, it seems he had an episode of acute heart failure following running for a train. As a result, he discovered that he had Bright's disease (or hypertension) with a dilated heart, a condition with a poor prognosis at the time. As a consequence he changed his diet, discontinued coffee and stopped smoking. His condition improved, he lost weight and his blood pressure fell. Over the next 4 years he developed a dietary system based on this experience. The dietary system he developed involved fasting and promoted the idea that certain foods require an acid pH environment in digestion, and other foods require an alkaline pH environment, and that both cannot take place at the same time, in the same environment.

In 1921 he went to Buffalo and in 1927 he was appointed director of The East Aurora Sun and Diet Sanatorium. where he developed the 'Sun-Diet Menus'. In this period Hay was a member of the Medical Advisory Board of the Defensive Diet League of America, and campaigned against the use of aluminum cooking utensils, vivisection and vaccination for smallpox. In 1930 he resigned from his local medical society just before charges of unethical advertising were preferred. In 1932 he purchased the Pocono Hay-ven resort and in 1935 became the Medical Director of Hay System, Inc. The Hay diet was popular around that time and many restaurants offered 'Hay-friendly' menus; followers of his dietary advice, who called themselves “Hayites”, included Henry Ford.

== Reception ==
Hay was criticized in the Journal of the American Medical Association as a food-faddist and later for advocating that a patient with type 1 diabetes stop taking insulin.

Physician Logan Clendening described the Hay Diet as a "half-baked unscientific food fad"

Jeffrey M. Pilcher a Professor of Food History has noted that:

[Hay] believed that carbohydrates and proteins should never be eaten at the same meal because the body uses alkaline enzymes to digest carbohydrates whereas acids work on proteins. Thus, if a person ate both types of foods together, the alkalines and acids would neutralize one another, the stomach would be unable to digest anything, and the food would simply rot in the intestines... His theory was exposed as flawed because the alkaline enzymes operate in one part of the intestine and the acids in another.

Hay's dieting ideas have received continual criticism over lack of a scientific basis. However, the Hay diet and its variants, such as the Kensington diet and the Beverly Hills Diet, have remained popular to this day, with actors such as Elizabeth Hurley, Helen Mirren and Catherine Zeta-Jones following food-combining diets.

== Publications ==
- The Medical Millennium, (1927)
- Health Via Food, (1929)
- Weight Control, (1935)
- A New Health Era, (1935)
- Building Better Bodies, (1936)
- The Hay System of Child Development (1936) [with Esther L. Smith]
- What Price Health, (1946)
- How to Always Be Well, (1967)

== See also ==
- Acidosis (low blood pH)
- Alkalosis (elevated blood pH)
- Hay diet
- Robert O. Young
- Rasmus Larssen Alsaker
