= Cancer Act 1939 =

Act of the Parliament of the United Kingdom

Cancer Act 1939 (Note: Section 8(1).)
- Act of Parliament
- Parliament of the United Kingdom
- Long title: An Act to make further provision for the treatment of cancer, to authorise the Minister of Health to lend money to the National Radium Trust, to prohibit certain advertisements relating to cancer, and for purposes connected with the matters aforesaid.
- Citation: 2 & 3 Geo. 6. c. 13
- Territorial extent: England and Wales; Scotland; (Note: Section 8(4).)

Dates
- Royal assent: 29 March 1939
- Commencement: 29 March 1939 (Note: The Acts of Parliament (Commencement) Act 1793.)
Other legislation
Amended by	Reorganisation of Offices (Scotland) Act 1939; National Health Service Act 1946; National Health Service (Scotland) Act 1947; National Health Service (Amendment) Act 1949; Medicines Act 1968; Criminal Procedure (Scotland) Act 1975; Criminal Justice Act 1982; Statute Law (Repeals) Act 1986; Legislative Reform (Local Authority Consent Requirements) (England and Wales) Order 2008
Relates to	Public Health Act 1936; Public Health (London) Act 1936

Status: Amended

Text of statute as originally enacted

Revised text of statute as amended

Text of the Cancer Act 1939 as in force today (including any amendments) within the United Kingdom, from legislation.gov.uk.

The Cancer Act 1939 (2 & 3 Geo. 6. c. 13) is an act of the Parliament of the United Kingdom passed in 1939 to:

- make further provision for the treatment of cancer;
- to authorise the Minister of Health to lend money to the National Radium Trust;
- to prohibit certain advertisements relating to cancer;
- and for purposes connected with the matters aforesaid.

As of 2026, the sole remaining provision is in respect of advertising to treat or cure cancer, all other provisions having been repealed or subsumed into other legislation. The act does not apply to Northern Ireland.

== Advertising ==
The act's most notable provision is a clause prohibiting taking any part in publication, except under specified conditions, of advertisements that "offer to treat any person for cancer, or to prescribe any remedy therefor, or to give any advice in connection with the treatment thereof". Prosecutions do take place, but are rare.

The expression "advertisement" includes any notice, circular, label, wrapper or other document, and any announcement made orally or by any means of producing or transmitting sounds.

The act provides for exceptions in making material available to registered medical and nursing personnel and pharmacists, and for material produced by hospitals and local authorities.

== Prosecutions under the act ==
According to an answer given in the House of Commons on 12 June 2014 there were 21 convictions under the Act between 1984 and 2013, and from then until 12 June 2014 there have been another four.

Convictions that have been reported in the press include:

- Jerry Sargeant "was found guilty of four counts of taking part in the publication of an advertisement containing an offer to treat a person for cancer relating to three pages on his business website and one video on YouTube" and his company, Star Magic Limited, was found guilty of two counts at his trial in March 2017. He was fined £4,700 at Westminster Magistrates Court on 8 November 2017.
- Steven Cook, fined £750 with costs of £1,500 in September 2014 for implying that colloidal silver could cure cancer – the case was brought by Essex Trading Standards.
- Stephen Ferguson, fined £1,750 with £2,500 costs and £120 victim surcharge in May 2014 for claiming that protein shakes and vitamin supplements had cured cancer in two of his patients – case brought by Westminster Trading Standards.
- Errol Denton, fined £1,000 for each of 9 offences, with costs of £9,821 and a victim surcharge of £100 in March 2014 for claiming that live blood analysis, lifestyle changes and herbs could cure cancer – case brought by Westminster Trading Standards.
- Adrian Pengelly, fined £600 with £2,000 costs and £15 victim surcharge in March 2010 for offering distance healing to cure cancer – case brought by Hereford Trading Standards.
- Donna Sims, given a two-year conditional discharge with costs of £1,100 in August 2009 for offering herbal remedies for cancer – case brought by Gloucestershire Trading Standards.
- Healthwize UK, fined £2,000 with £2,235 costs in March 2009 for selling ellagic acid with claims that it could inhibit the growth of cancer cells – case brought by Derbyshire Trading Standards.
- Andrew Harris, who sold Triamazon via the Internet, received a two-year conditional discharge with £350 costs in September 2008 – case brought by Trafford Trading Standards.
- In 2000, an import-export company called Plasmafire UK Ltd was prosecuted along with the directors of the company for selling an ozone therapy machine. The promotional material claimed it could "attack and destroy cancer cells" and possibly "dissolve" a tumour entirely. The prosecution included charges under other consumer protection legislation. The company was fined £11,000 (plus £1,000) costs. The directors pleaded guilty and had to pay fines of £2,000 and £1,500 (and £8,013 and £2,000 in costs respectively). One of the directors was given a community service order requiring 200 hours of work.
- Michael Sanders, a former policeman who ran an alternative health business selling Essiac, a herbal tea that he claimed could help cure cancer, AIDS and other serious illnesses. In 1999, he pleaded guilty, fined £800 and had to pay £500 in costs.
- Eladon Ltd, a company based in Bangor, was fined £500 (with £3,500 in costs) in 1994 for including mention of purported assistance in treating cancer in promotional materials for Siberian eleutherococcus root.
- Oswald Earp of Egham was prosecuted in 1944 in the Chertsey Sessions for promoting a substance called 'Tassa' which he claimed could cure both cataracts and cancer. In court, he claimed that he was not aware that his advertisement breached the Cancer Act, though the advertisement exhibited at court pointed to "cases in which rapid and complete recovery followed its use suggest strongly that it must be the same in the dreaded cancer though were I to state this to be a fact I should be liable, under the Cancer Act, to fine and imprisonment". He was fined £10 (equivalent to approximately £350 in 2017) for breaching the Cancer Act, and a further £10 for breaching the Pharmacy and Medicines Act.
- One of the earliest recorded prosecutions was of William Peter Vickerstaff, a herbalist in Leicester. He appeared before the court in January 1943. He claimed that he was unaware that promotional materials in his shop window mentioned cancer and made an undertaking to pay costs £15 and 5 shillings in costs (approximately £600 in 2017). He was later tried again in July 1944 and found guilty—this time, being fined £125 and 5 shilings, including costs (approximately £4,450), though this was reduced on appeal to £20.
