= Bright's disease =

Historical classification of kidney diseases

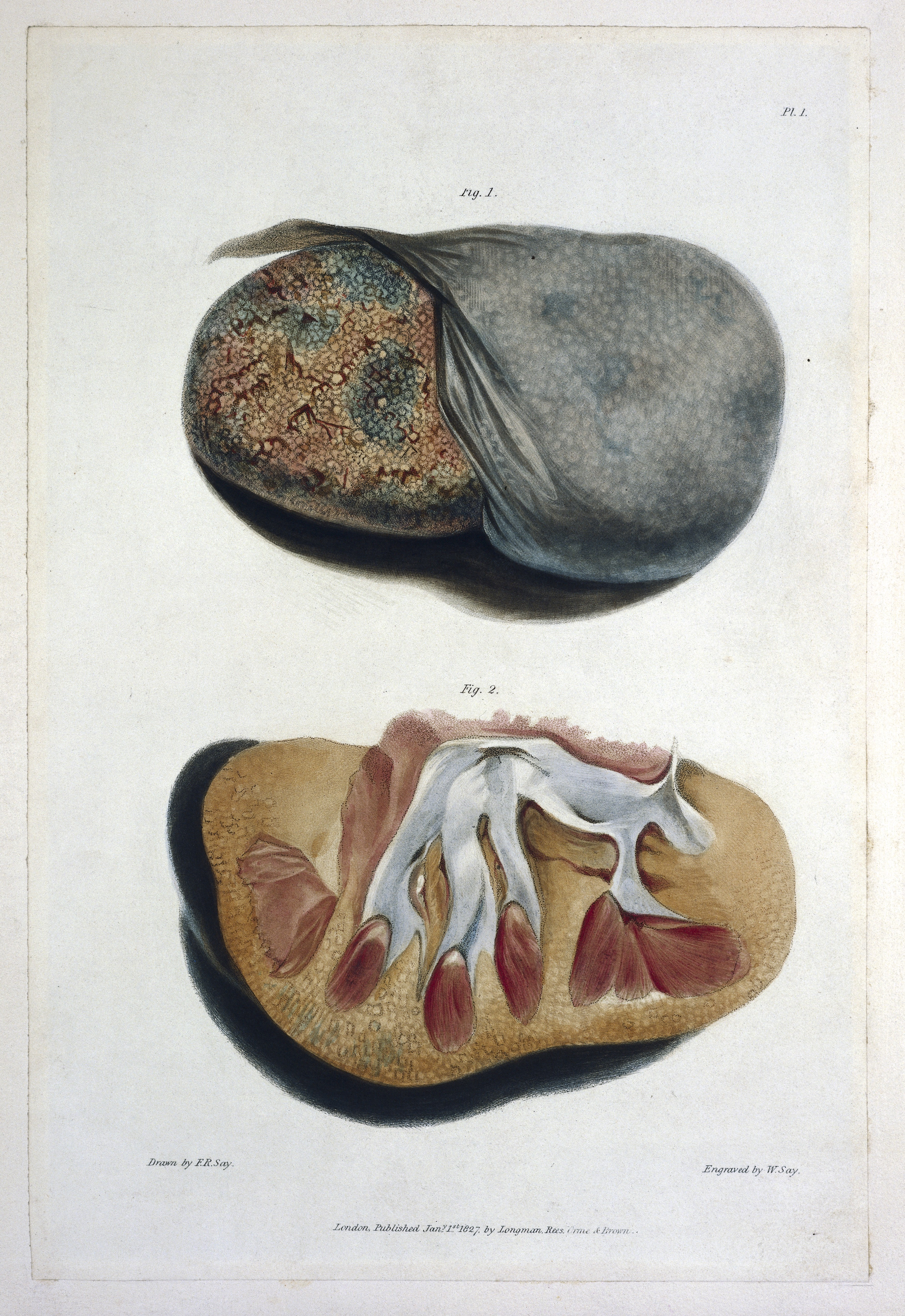
- Diseased kidney from Richard Bright's Reports of Medical Cases Longman, London (1827–1831); Wellcome Library, London
- Specialty: Nephrology

Bright's disease is a historical classification of kidney diseases that are described in modern medicine as acute or chronic nephritis. It was characterized by swelling and the presence of albumin in the urine. It was frequently accompanied by high blood pressure and heart disease.

== Signs and symptoms ==
The symptoms and signs of Bright's disease were first described in 1827 by the English physician Richard Bright, after whom the disease was named. In his Reports of Medical Cases, he described 25 cases of dropsy (edema) which he attributed to kidney disease. Symptoms and signs included: inflammation of serous membranes, haemorrhages, apoplexy, convulsions, blindness and coma. Many of these cases were found to have albumin in their urine (detected by the spoon and candle-heat coagulation), and showed striking morbid changes of the kidneys post-mortem. The triad of dropsy, albumin in the urine and kidney disease came to be regarded as characteristic of Bright's disease.

Subsequent work by Bright and others indicated an association with cardiac hypertrophy, which Bright attributed to stimulation of the heart. Frederick Akbar Mahomed showed that a rise in blood pressure could precede the appearance of albumin in the urine, and the rise in blood pressure and increased resistance to flow was believed to explain the cardiac hypertrophy.

It is today known that Bright's disease is caused by a wide and diverse range of kidney diseases; thus, the term Bright's disease is retained for historical application but not in modern diagnosis. The disease was diagnosed frequently in diabetic patients; at least some of these cases would probably correspond to a modern diagnosis of diabetic nephropathy.

== Treatment ==
Bright's disease was historically treated with warm baths, blood-letting, squill, digitalis, mercuric compounds, opium, diuretics, laxatives and dietary therapy, including abstinence from alcoholic drinks, cheese and red meat. Arnold Ehret was diagnosed with Bright's disease and pronounced incurable by 24 of Europe's most respected doctors; he designed The Mucusless Diet Healing System, which apparently cured his illness. William Howard Hay had the illness and, it is claimed, cured himself using the Hay diet.

== Society and culture ==
=== List of people diagnosed with Bright's disease ===
- Isaac Albéniz, Spanish composer, began suffering from Bright's disease in 1900, and died on 18 May 1909.
- Chester A. Arthur, 21st President of the United States, died 18 November 1886.
- Charles Bendire, soldier and ornithologist, died in 1897.
- Mathew B. Brady, early American photographer, died on 15 January 1896.
- Isambard Kingdom Brunel, 9 April 1806 – 15 September 1859, an English civil engineer and mechanical engineer considered "one of the most ingenious and prolific figures in engineering history"
- John Bunny, comic star of the early motion picture era, died on 26 April 1915.
- George-Étienne Cartier, Canadian Father of Confederation, died on 20 May 1873.
- Charles B. Clark, a US Representative from Wisconsin and one of the founders of the Kimberly-Clark Corporation.
- Ty Cobb, Hall of Fame member and Detroit Tigers center fielder, was diagnosed with a list of ailments, including Bright's disease, in 1959, and died on 17 July 1961.
- Sir Muthu Coomaraswamy, barrister and parliamentarian, died on 4 May 1879.
- Larry Corcoran, American Major League Baseball pitcher, died on 14 October 1891.
- Charles Cotton, English footballer, died on 3 January 1910.
- John Crichton-Stuart, 3rd Marquess of Bute, Victorian aristocrat and industrial magnate whose vast expenditure on buildings makes him the pre-eminent architectural patron of the 19th century; diagnosed with Bright's disease and died after multiple strokes on 9 October 1900.
- Marcus Daly, Irish immigrant; Copper King of Butte, Montana; discoverer of copper riches in the Anaconda mine and founder of Anaconda, Montana; first president of Amalgamated/Anaconda Copper Company; died on 12 November 1900.
- Emily Dickinson, poet, died on 15 May 1886.
- Catherine Eddowes, victim of Jack the Ripper in 1888, was found to be in the advanced stages of Bright's disease when she died.
- John Ericsson, Swedish-American mechanical engineer most famous for designing USS Monitor, died on 8 March 1889.
- Frederick William Faber, Catholic priest and author, died on 26 September 1863.
- Roswell Eaton Goodell, American politician and businessman, died on 9 October 1903.
- Sydney Greenstreet, British actor, died on 18 January 1954. He is remembered for the films The Maltese Falcon, Casablanca and Passage to Marseille.
- Lizzie Halliday, Irish-American serial killer, died on 28 June 1918 after spending nearly half her life in a mental asylum.
- Alice Harrison, 19th-century stage actress, died in 1896.
- James J. Hogan, Yale football captain and three-time All-American, died on 10 March 1910.
- Bill Hogg, pitcher for the New York Highlanders, died 8 December 1909.
- Winifred Holtby, British writer, died on 29 September 1935. She is remembered for South Riding, her biography of Virginia Woolf, and her journalism and feminist writings.
- Caroline Miskel Hoyt, actress, died on 2 October 1898, after childbirth.
- Martin Nelson Johnson, US Senator from North Dakota, died on 21 October 1909.
- Warren S. Johnson, founder of Johnson Controls, died on 5 December 1911, at the age of 64.
- James McHenry Jones, African American educator, school administrator, businessperson, and minister, died on 22 September 1909.
- Okakura Kakuzo, Japanese scholar, died on 2 September 1913.
- Kitty Kiernan, fiancée of Irish revolutionary Michael Collins, died of complications thought to be related to Bright's disease on 25 July 1945.
- Rowland Hussey Macy Sr., an American businessman and founder of the department store chain R.H. Macy & Company, died on 29 March 1877.
- Gregor Mendel, Austrian scientist, teacher and Augustinian friar, died on 6 January 1884.
- Henry Chapman Mercer, a famous tile-maker, archeologist, and collector from Doylestown, Pennsylvania, died on 9 March 1930.
- Billy Miske, American light heavyweight and heavyweight boxer, who once fought Jack Dempsey for the World Heavyweight Boxing title, died on 1 January 1924.
- Helena Modjeska, Victorian actress, died on 8 April 1909.
- Wayne Munn, professional wrestler and collegiate football player, died in 1931.
- Commodore Nutt, the famous dwarf, died on 25 May 1881.
- Ouray, Tabeguache Ute chief, died on 24 August 1880.
- Mary Ewing Outerbridge, American tennis pioneer, died on 3 May 1886.
- Isaac C. Parker, US federal judge known as "The Hanging Judge," died on 17 November 1896.
- Linus Pauling, Nobel Prize-winning chemist, and the only two-time winner of an unshared Nobel.
- Howard Pyle, American illustrator, died on 9 November 1911.
- Thomas Brackett Reed, American politician from Maine and 32nd Speaker of the US House of Representatives, died on 7 December 1902.
- Bass Reeves, Old West lawman; his death in 1910 was attributed to Bright's disease.
- Henry Hobson Richardson, prominent North American architect, best known for his work in a style that became known as Richardsonian Romanesque, died on 27 April 1886.
- Albert Charles "Al" Ringling, eldest of the Ringling brothers, died on 1 January 1916.
- Alice Hathaway Lee Roosevelt, first wife of Theodore Roosevelt, died on 14 February 1884 due to kidney failure caused by Bright's disease that was worsened due to pregnancy.
- Dante Gabriel Rossetti, English poet, illustrator, painter and translator, died on 9 April 1882.
- Paddy Ryan, American bare-knuckle boxing heavyweight champion, died on 14 December 1900. Bright's disease was a disease among some early boxers who took frequent pounding to the abdomen in their bouts.
- Richard Warren Sears, an American businessman and co-founder of the department store chain Sears, Roebuck and Company, died on 28 September 1914.
- Jimmy Sebring, who played in the 1903 World Series with the Pittsburgh Pirates and was the first player in World Series history to hit a home run, died on 22 December 1909.
- Charles Sumner Sedgwick, architect based in Minneapolis, Minnesota, died in 1922.
- Louis "French Louie" Seymour, woodsman, died on 28 February 1915.
- Kate Shelley, railroad heroine and the first woman in the United States to have a bridge named after her, the Kate Shelley High Bridge, died on 21 January 1912.
- James S. Sherman, Vice President of the United States from 1909 until his death on 30 October 1912.
- Luke Short, famed gunfighter, was diagnosed with Bright's disease in early 1893, but died on 8 September of that year due to edema.
- Charles H. Spurgeon, London pastor known as "The Prince of Preachers", died in 1892.
- Robert Stroud, "the Birdman of Alcatraz," was diagnosed with Bright's disease at Fort Leavenworth Pentitentiary shortly after he began his original sentence, but lived on until 21 November 1963.
- Alfred H. Terry, an important Union Major General and, later, commanding officer of Lt. Colonel George Armstrong Custer, died on 16 December 1890.
- Virgilio Tojetti, Italian-American painter and the son of Domenico Tojetti, died on 27 March 1901.
- Victor Trumper, Australian cricketer, died on 28 June 1915.
- Booker T. Washington, founder of Tuskegee University, died on 14 November 1915.
- Stanford White, prominent New York architect, diagnosed by autopsy after being killed by a shooting on 25 June 1906.
- Tennessee Williams had it as a child, resulting from diphtheria. He was unable to walk for a long time.
- Ellen Axson Wilson, first wife of Woodrow Wilson, died on 6 August 1914.
- Ross Youngs, Baseball Hall of Famer, died on 22 October 1927.
