= Live blood analysis =

Alternative medical diagnostic method

- Claims: Ability to diagnose disease from blood examined using dark field microscopy
- Related scientific disciplines: Microscopy, dark field microscopy
- Year proposed: ca. 1925
- Original proponents: Günther Enderlein
- Subsequent proponents: Robert O. Young

Live blood analysis (LBA), live cell analysis, Hemaview or nutritional blood analysis is the use of high-resolution dark field microscopy to observe live blood cells. Live blood analysis is promoted by some alternative medicine practitioners, who assert that it can diagnose a range of diseases. It has its origins in the now-discarded theories of pleomorphism promoted by Günther Enderlein, notably in his 1925 book Bakterien-Cyklogenie.

There is no scientific evidence that live blood analysis is reliable or effective, and it has been described as a fraudulent means of convincing people that they are ill and should purchase dietary supplements. It is not accepted in laboratory practice and its validity as a laboratory test has not been established. Its practice has been described as a pseudoscientific, bogus and fraudulent, and the medical profession has dismissed it as quackery. The field of live blood microscopy is unregulated; there is no training requirement or recognised qualification for practitioners and no recognised medical validity to the results. Proponents have made false claims about both medical blood pathology testing and their own services, which some have refused to amend when instructed by the Advertising Standards Authority.

In January 2014, prominent live blood proponent and teacher Robert O. Young was arrested and charged for practising medicine without a license. In March 2014, Errol Denton, a former student of his and a UK live blood practitioner, was convicted on nine counts in a rare prosecution under the Cancer Act 1939, followed in May 2014 by another former student, Stephen Ferguson.

== Overview ==
Proponents claim that live blood analysis provides information "about the state of the immune system, possible vitamin deficiencies, amount of toxicity, pH and mineral imbalance, areas of concern and weaknesses, fungus and yeast." Some even claim it can "spot cancer and other degenerative immune system diseases up to two years before they would otherwise be detectable" or say they can diagnose "lack of oxygen in the blood, low trace minerals, lack of exercise, too much alcohol or yeast, weak kidneys, bladder or spleen." Practitioners include alternative medicine providers such as nutritionists, herbologists, naturopaths, and chiropractors.

Dark field microscopy is useful to enhance contrast in unstained samples, but live blood analysis is not proven to be useful for any of its claimed indications. Two journal articles published in the alternative medical literature found that darkfield microscopy seemed unable to detect cancer, and that live blood analysis lacked reliability, reproducibility, and sensitivity and specificity. Edzard Ernst, professor of complementary medicine at the University of Exeter and University of Plymouth, notes: "No credible scientific studies have demonstrated the reliability of LBA for detecting any of the above conditions." Ernst describes live blood analysis as a "fraudulent" means of convincing patients to buy dietary supplements. Quackwatch has been critical of live blood analysis, noting dishonesty in the claims brought forward by its proponents. The alternative medicine popularizer Andrew Weil dismissed live blood analysis as "completely bogus", writing: "Dark-field microscopy combined with live blood analysis may sound like cutting-edge science, but it's old-fashioned hokum. Don't buy into it."

== Common diagnoses ==
There are several common diagnoses by LBA practitioners that are actually based on observation of artifacts normally found in microscopy, and ignorance of basic biological science:

Acid in the blood: When the red blood cells stack on top of one another and appear like stacks of coins, it is called 'rouleaux' formation. By observation of the rouleaux, the LBA practitioners diagnose 'acid in the blood', while other practitioners suggest a weak pancreas. Rouleaux of red blood cells under the microscope is an artifact which occurs when the blood sample at the edge of the coverslip starts to dry out; where a large number of red blood cells clump together; or when the blood starts to clot when contacted with the glass. These artifacts are observed in only small, selected areas on the slide, while near the center of the slide the red blood cells are free floating. Blood acidosis is a severe illness and can not be diagnosed by observation of blood, nor treated by dietary supplements.

- Uric acid crystals and/or cholesterol plaques: Microscopic splinters of glass are often present when the slide is not cleaned thoroughly. Observation of such shards is claimed by the LBA practitioners to be uric acid crystals or cholesterol plaques, and thus to be indicative of 'acid imbalance, stress or poor lymphatic circulation' among other vague ailments. Uric acid crystals and cholesterol plaques, if present, are not visible in the blood samples.
- Parasites: Particles of dirt and debris, commonly found on glass slides not cleaned thoroughly, or slightly deformed red blood cells are mistaken to be parasites. Patients with parasites in the blood stream would be very sick and in need of immediate medical care, not by nutritional or herbal supplements or life style change as often recommended by LBA practitioners.
- Bacteria and yeast: LBA practitioners observe small irregular shape on the red blood cell membrane, a common artifact, and claim it represents bacteria or yeasts budding off the edge of the cell membrane. This claim violates the basic principle of biology that each living organism is unique and can not be transformed from one into another. Presence of bacteria or yeasts in the blood indicates the patient is in danger of developing sepsis, a life-threatening condition.
- Fermentations: Light spots on some red blood cells are identified by LBA practitioners as fermentations caused by high sugar content in the blood. Fermentation is a chemical reaction of breaking down sugar into alcohol and carbon dioxide catalyzed by enzymes produced in yeast. The red blood cells are not yeasts and cannot ferment sugar.

== Regulatory issues ==
In 1996, the Pennsylvania Department of Laboratories informed three Pennsylvania chiropractors that Infinity2's "Nutritional Blood Analysis" could not be used for diagnostic purposes unless they maintain a laboratory that has both state and federal certification for complex testing.

In 2001, the Health and Human Services Office of the Inspector General issued a report on regulation of "unestablished laboratory tests" that focused on live blood cell analysis and the difficulty of regulating unestablished tests and laboratories.

In 2002, an Australian naturopath was convicted and fined for falsely claiming that he could diagnose illness using live blood analysis after the death of a patient. He was acquitted of manslaughter. He subsequently changed his name and was later banned from practice for life.

In 2005, the Rhode Island Department of Health ordered a chiropractor to stop performing live blood analysis. An attorney for the State Board of Examiners in Chiropractic Medicine described the test as "useless" and a "money-making scheme... The point of it all is apparently to sell nutritional supplements." A state medical board official said that live blood analysis has no discernible value, and that the public "should be very suspicious of any practitioner who offers this test."

In 2011, the UK General Medical Council suspended a doctor's licence to practise after he used live blood analysis to diagnose patients with Lyme disease. The doctor accepted he had been practising "bad medicine".

In 2013, following several Advertising Standards Authority adjudications against claims made by LBA practitioners, the Committee of Advertising Practice added new guidelines to their AdviceOnline database advising what LBA marketers may claim in their advertising material. These state that "CAP is yet to see any evidence for the efficacy of this therapy which, without rigorous evidence to support it, should be advertised on an availability-only platform."

One of these practitioners, Errol Denton, who practised out of a serviced office in Harley Street, was prosecuted in December 2013 under the Cancer Act 1939, and chose to use a Freeman on the Land defence. On March 20, 2014, he was convicted on nine counts under the Cancer Act 1939 and fined £9,000 plus around £10,000 in costs. In April 2018, Denton was further convicted of two counts of "engaging in unfair commercial practice" and one of "selling food not of the quality demanded", for selling a bottle of colloidal silver drink to an undercover trading standards officer in February 2016, after examining a drop of her blood and claiming that it indicated that she had dislocated her shoulder. He was made the subject of a Criminal Behaviour Order, fined £2,250, and ordered pay £15,000 in costs.

== See also ==
- List of ineffective cancer treatments
