= Marilyn Diamond =

American author and speaker (1944–2025)

- Born: Marilyn Martha Horecker; June 4, 1944; Washington, D.C., U.S.
- Died: September 7, 2025 (aged 81); Roanoke, Virginia, U.S.
- Occupations: Author; spokesperson
- Years active: 1985–2013
- Spouse(s): Peter Neuwirth (m. 1965; div. 1973) Harvey Diamond (m. 1976; div. 1993) Donald Schnell (m. 1994; div. 2014)
- Children: 3

Marilyn Martha Diamond (née Horecker; June 4, 1944 – September 7, 2025) was an American author and speaker on the topic of anti-aging and longevity. She was known for advocating a "cleansing" or "detoxification" diet.

== Life and career ==
Marilyn Martha Horecker was born in Washington, D.C. on June 4, 1944, the daughter of Bernard and Frances (née Goldstein) Horecker. Her father was a biochemist and served as dean of the Weill Cornell Graduate School of Medical Sciences. She grew up in Maryland and New York, and graduated from New York University in 1968, where she studied the Romance languages.

In 1985, with her then husband Harvey Diamond, she co-authored the best-selling health and wellness book Fit for Life. The book built on the natural health movement that had roots in 19th century, and was part of the development of the fascination with celebrity beauty in contemporary American culture.

Diamond's ideas about diet and aging have been the subject of controversy in the media. In particular, nutritionists disagree with her assertion that some foods should not be eaten together.

=== Personal life and death ===
Diamond was married three times and had three children, a daughter and two sons. She died from complications of dementia in Roanoke, Virginia, on September 7, 2025, at the age of 81.

== Publications ==
=== Books ===
- Diamond, Marilyn (2010). Fit for Life. Grand Central Life & Style/Hachette. pp. 336 pages. ISBN 978-0446553643.
- Diamond, Marilyn (2013). Young for Life: The Easy No-Diet, No-sweat Plan to Look and Feel 10 Years Younger. Rodale Books. pp. 352 pages. ISBN 978-1609615420.
- Diamond, Marilyn (1987). A New Way of Eating from the Fit for Life Kitchen. Grand Central Publishing. pp. 176 pages. ISBN 1609615425.
- Diamond, Marilyn (1998). Fitonics for Life. Avon. pp. 448 pages. ISBN 0380789671.
- Diamond, Marilyn (1990). The American Vegetarian Cookbook from the Fit for Life Kitchen. Grand Central Publishing. pp. 422 pages. ISBN 0380789671.
- Diamond, Marilyn (1987). Living Health. Grand Central Publishing. pp. 468 pages. ISBN 0380789671.
- Diamond, Marilyn (1998). Recipes for Life: From the Fitonics Kitchen. Avon Books. pp. 353 pages. ISBN 0380789671.
- Diamond, Marilyn (1991). The Fit for Life Cookbook. Bantam Books. pp. 449 pages. ISBN 0553404067.
