= Grant loaf =

British wholemeal bread invented in World War II

- Type: Bread
- Created by: Doris Grant
- Main ingredients: Wholemeal flour, brown sugar, salt, yeast, olive oil

A Grant loaf is a wholemeal bread, invented by accident in World War II by baker Doris Grant to encourage workers to eat well on their rations. The loaf was subsequently named after her. It is peculiar amongst breads made with a yeast in that kneading is not necessary.

== Recipe ==
A typical recipe consists of 450g strong wholemeal flour (spelt can be used instead), 1 tsp brown sugar such as Muscovado, (1 tablespoon of honey may be used instead), 2 teaspoons of salt, yeast and 400-450ml of hand-hot water. The flour is warmed in the oven for about 10 minutes on low heat. The warmed flour is then placed into a bowl and the salt, sugar and yeast are combined into a dough. The dough is stretched out into an oblong on both sides, placed in a tin, and then left to rise for 30–40 minutes in a warm place, or for about an hour at room temperature. The oven is pre-heated to 200°C, bread bakes for 30–40 minutes.
