= Acid ash hypothesis =

The acid-ash hypothesis is a medical hypothesis which suggests that excessively acidic diets may result in a number of identifiable health effects, including an increased risk of osteoporosis. It has received some attention in the lay community, and has been used to support the diet known as the Alkaline diet. According to the hypothesis, acid ash is produced by meat, poultry, cheese, fish, eggs, and grains. Alkaline ash is produced by fruits and vegetables, except cranberries, prunes and plums. Since the acid or alkaline ash designation is based on the residue left on combustion rather than the acidity of the food, foods such as citrus fruits that are generally considered acidic are actually considered alkaline producing in this diet.

== Research ==
Recent systematic reviews have been published which have methodically analyzed the weight of available scientific evidence, and have found no significant evidence to support the acid–ash hypothesis in regard to prevention of osteoporosis.

Furthermore, a meta-analysis of studies on the effect of dietary phosphate intake contradicted the expected results under the acid–ash hypothesis with respect to calcium in the urine and bone metabolism. This result suggests use of this diet to prevent calcium loss from bone is not justified. Other meta-analyses which have investigated the effect of total dietary acid intake have also found no evidence that acid intake increases the risk for osteoporosis as would be expected under the acid-ash hypothesis.

Another review looked at the effects of dairy product intake, which have been hypothesized to increase the acid load of the body through phosphate and protein components. This review found no significant evidence suggesting dairy product intake causes acidosis or increases risk for osteoporosis. A meta-analysis on the effects of alkaline potassium salts on calcium metabolism and bone health found that supplementation with alkaline potassium salts reduces loss of calcium in urine and reduces acid secretion.

== Relation to alkaline diets ==
The acid ash hypothesis suggests that diets high in "acid ash" (acid producing) elements would cause the body to try to buffer (or counteract) any additional acid load in the body by breaking down bone, leading to weaker bones and increased risk for osteoporosis. Consequently, "alkaline ash" (alkaline producing) elements would hypothetically decrease the risk of osteoporosis. This hypothesis has been advanced in a position statement of the Academy of Nutrition and Dietetics, in a publication of the U.S. National Academy of Sciences, as well as other scientific publications, which have stated foods high in potassium and magnesium such as fruits and vegetables may decrease the risk of osteoporosis through increased alkaline ash production. However, this acceptance of the acid-ash hypothesis as a major modifiable risk factor of osteoporosis by these publications was largely made without significant critical review by high quality systematic analysis.

It has also been speculated that an alkaline diet may have an effect on muscle wasting, growth hormone metabolism or back pain, though there is no conclusive evidence to confirm these hypotheses. Given an aging population, the effects of an alkaline diet on public health may offer some benefits due to its focus on an increase in fresh fruits and vegetables, but there are limited scientific studies on the topic.
