= Alice Harrison =

American actress

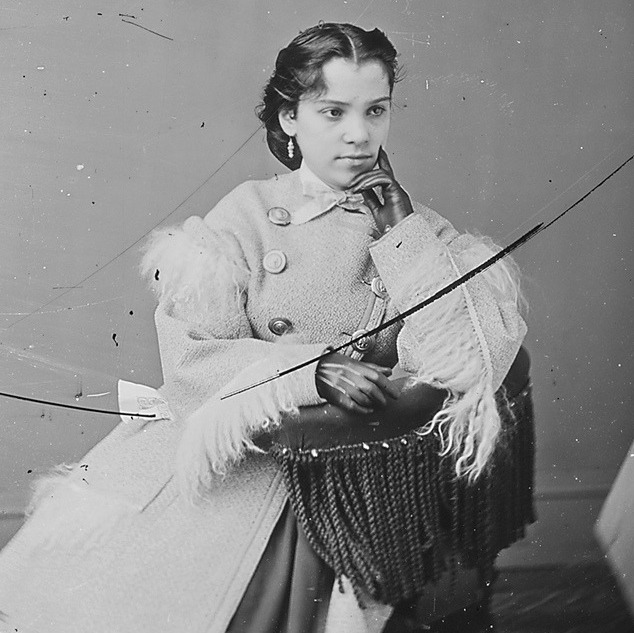
- Harrison in 1875
- Born: c. 1849
- Died: May 3, 1896 (aged 46–47)
- Occupation: Actress

Alice Harrison (c. 1849 – May 3, 1896) was a 19th-century stage actress.

== Career ==
Harrison performed for numerous companies over her career, including the California Western Stock Company in San Francisco. As part of her tenure in New York, she performed at the Grand Opera House.

In July 1886 Harrison performed in the comedy, The Maid of Belleville, at the Star Theatre. The company, which included actor Frank David, moved on to Chicago when the hot summer weather forced the theater to close abruptly.

The play "Viva" was written for her and her brother by Leonard Grover. Her performances mostly involved musical comedy. After leaving New York, she performed for the Boston Museum.

== Coleman House shooting ==
Harrison lodged at the Coleman House during her performance run in New York. In April 1879, prior to leaving for an acting engagement in Boston, Massachusetts, she was visited by Nathan Washington. During his visit, a New York madame known as Birdie Bell (a.k.a. Marion Ward), attempted to murder Mr. Washington, shooting at Harrison first. Suspicion fell upon Harrison as a potential accomplice due to her leaving the city shortly after the shooting, but she was found innocent of any involvement.

== Death ==
Harrison was diagnosed with Bright's Disease in 1892. She died of the disease, complicated by pneumonia, in 1896. Her remains were cremated and placed in a niche with the ashes of her father.
