= UEFA Euro 2008 =

European Football Championship

Fußball-Europameisterschaft 2008 (in German) Championnat d'Europe de football 2008 (in French) Campionato Europeo di calcio 2008 (in Italian) Campiunadi d'Europa da ballape 2008 (in Romansh)
- Expect Emotions

Tournament details
- Host countries: Austria; Switzerland
- Dates: 7–29 June
- Teams: 16
- Venues: 8 (in 8 host cities)

Final positions
- Champions: Spain (2nd title)
- Runners-up: Germany
- Third place: Russia; Turkey (Note: The tournament semi-finalists were awarded bronze medals, despite the absence of a third-place match.)

Tournament statistics
- Matches played: 31
- Goals scored: 77 (2.48 per match)
- Attendance: 1,143,990 (36,903 per match)
- Top scorer: (Spain) David Villa (4 goals)
- Best player: (Spain) Xavi

The 2008 UEFA European Football Championship, commonly referred to as UEFA Euro 2008 or simply Euro 2008, was the 13th UEFA European Championship, a quadrennial football tournament contested by the member nations of UEFA (the Union of European Football Associations). It took place in Austria and Switzerland (both hosting the tournament for the first time) from 7 to 29 June 2008.

The tournament was won by Spain, who defeated Germany 1–0 in the final. Spain were only the second nation to win all their group stage fixtures and then the European Championship itself, matching France's achievement from 1984. Spain were also the first team since Germany in 1996 to win the tournament undefeated.

Greece were the defending champions going into the tournament, having won UEFA Euro 2004. They recorded the worst finish in Euro 2008, losing their three group fixtures and collecting the least prize money. Throughout 31 matches, the participating nations totalled 77 goals, the same as the previous tournament.

Austria and Switzerland automatically qualified as hosts; the remaining 14 teams were determined through a qualifying tournament, played between August 2006 and November 2007. As European champions, Spain earned the right to compete in the 2009 FIFA Confederations Cup in South Africa.

== Bid process ==
Austria and Switzerland jointly bid to host the games, and facing competition from six other bids: Bosnia and Herzegovina–Croatia, Greece–Turkey, a 4-way Nordic bid (from Denmark, Finland, Norway and Sweden), Hungary, Russia and Scotland–Republic of Ireland. Austria and Hungary had previously bid together to host Euro 2004, losing out to Portugal, while Sweden had hosted Euro 1992.

Austria–Switzerland, Hungary, Greece–Turkey and the Nordic bid were recommended, in that order, before the final vote by UEFA's National Teams Committee.

The final vote by the UEFA executive committee was:

1. Austria–Switzerland
2. Hungary
3. Greece–Turkey
4. Nordic
5. Scotland–Ireland
6. Russia
7. Bosnia and Herzegovina–Croatia

The Austria–Switzerland bid became the second successful joint bid in the competition's history, following the UEFA Euro 2000 hosted by Belgium and the Netherlands. The following tournament, held in Poland and Ukraine, became the third jointly hosted tournament.

== Summary ==
Qualification for Euro 2008 started in August 2006, just over a month after the end of the 2006 FIFA World Cup. The qualifying tournament was contested by national teams from each of UEFA's member associations except Austria and Switzerland, who had automatically qualified for the final tournament as hosts, and Montenegro, who came into existence too late to be admitted to UEFA. England was the only seeded team not to qualify for the tournament proper, whereas Russia was the only unseeded one to qualify. The tournament also marked the debuts of Austria and Poland.

The draw for the final tournament took place at the Culture and Congress Centre in Lucerne on 2 December 2007, and saw Group C immediately labelled as the "group of death", with Italy, France, Romania and the Netherlands competing for the two qualifying places. In contrast, Germany and Portugal were deemed to have an easy draw, as the tournament structure meant they could not meet Italy, France, the Netherlands or Spain until the final.

In the group stage, Croatia, Spain and the Netherlands all qualified with maximum points. Austria and Switzerland were not expected to progress, despite the advantage of being the hosts. In Group A, the Swiss lost their captain, Alexander Frei, to injury in their first game and became the first team to be eliminated from the tournament, after losing their first two matches. Switzerland managed to beat the group winner Portugal in their last game.

In Group B, Austria managed to set up a decisive final game against Germany, dubbed "Austria's final". However, they lost by one goal, making Euro 2008 the first European Championship not to have one of the host nations present in the knockout stage. In an exciting final game in Group A, an injury- and suspension-hit Turkey came back from 2–0 down to beat the Czech Republic 3–2, after an uncharacteristic handling mistake by Petr Čech, in the last few minutes, left Nihat Kahveci with the simplest of finishes.

In the same game, goalkeeper Volkan Demirel was shown a red card for pushing Czech striker Jan Koller to the ground. The Turks joined Portugal as the qualifiers from Group A. France were the high-profile victims of Group C, recording just one point from a goalless draw against Romania in their opening game. Italy beat the French, on the final day, to finish on four points and join the Netherlands in the quarter-finals. Finally, in Group D, Greece failed to reproduce the form of their shock 2004 win, and ended the tournament with no points. Russia qualified at the expense of Sweden, after beating them in a final game decider, joining Spain in the knockout stage.

Torrential rain during the Group A match between Switzerland and Turkey on 11 June resulted in the pitch at St. Jakob-Park in Basel requiring to be re-laid. The new pitch was installed in advance of the quarter-final match between Portugal and Germany on 19 June. In the quarter-finals, the Portuguese team was unable to give their coach, Luiz Felipe Scolari, a fitting send-off – following the mid-tournament announcement that Scolari would be leaving to join English club Chelsea – losing in an exciting game against Germany. Turkey continued their streak of last-gasp wins, equalising at the end of extra-time against Croatia and advancing on penalties. Coached by Dutchman Guus Hiddink, Russia eliminated the Netherlands with two extra-time goals. The last quarter-final match saw Spain defeat Italy on penalties, after a goalless draw in regular time.

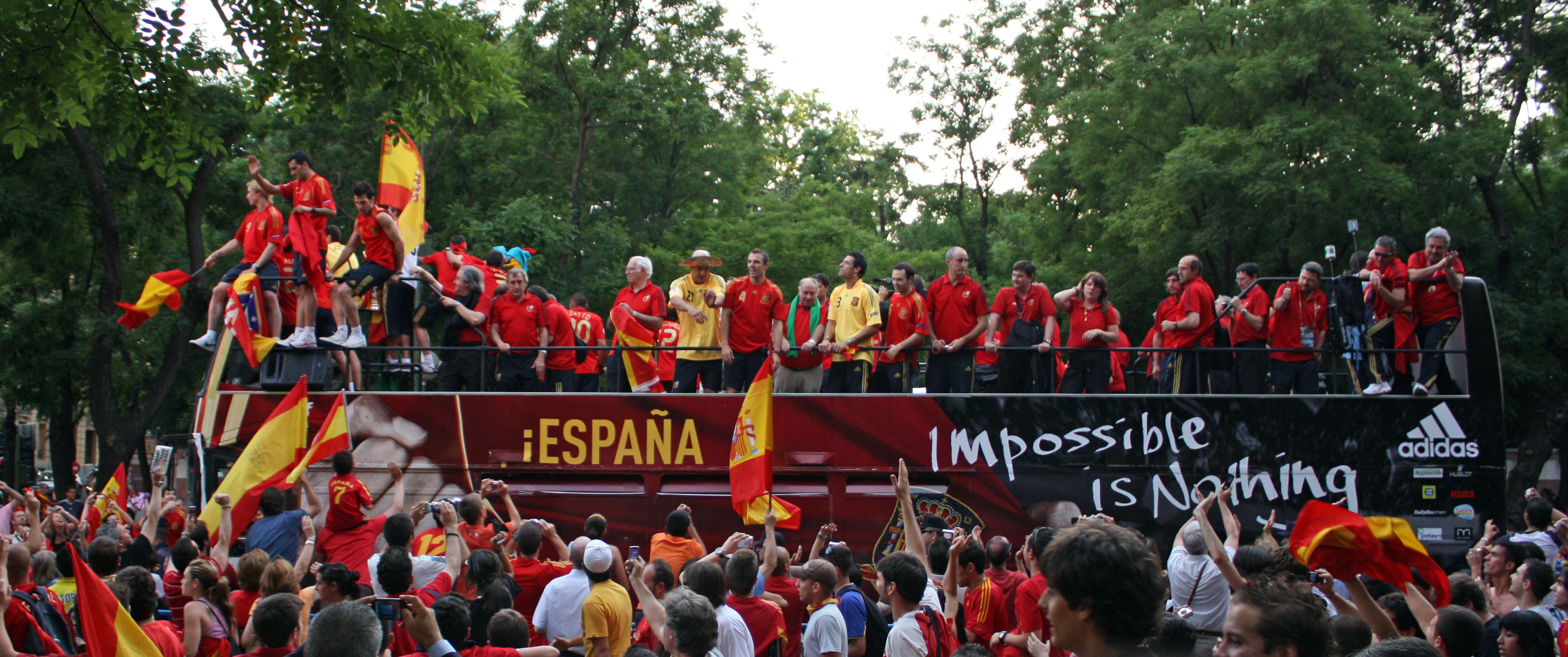
The Spanish football team touring Madrid as champions

Turkey's progress was halted by Germany in the semi-finals. Turkey entered the game with nine of their squad members missing due to injury or suspension, but still scored the first goal. Later, they levelled the score at 2–2, before Germany scored the winning goal in the final minute. The world television feed of the match was intermittently lost during the match, which prevented the broadcast of Germany's second goal.

This was due to a thunderstorm at the broadcasting relay station in Austria, despite the game being played in Switzerland. Swiss Television SRG SSR still had a feed, because of their own broadcasting facilities at the venue. During the lost world feed, German and Austrian television ZDF and ORF started to broadcast the feed of German-speaking Swiss channel SF 1.

This act ensured that the German goal was actually broadcast in Germany although not in Turkey. Spain won the second semi-final against Russia by three goals to nil, through second-half goals from Xavi, Daniel Güiza and David Silva, earning Spain their first appearance in a major final for 24 years.

In the final, held at Vienna's Ernst-Happel-Stadion, Spain became European champions for the second time after Fernando Torres' first-half goal proved enough to defeat Germany. Though Germany had a strong start, Spain started to look more dangerous after they had settled.

After half an hour, Xavi played a pass in behind the Germany back line towards Torres, who outmuscled a hesitant Philipp Lahm and clipped the ball over the diving Jens Lehmann and just inside the far post. That goal proved to be the only goal of the game, which Spain dominated despite Germany having the majority of the possession, and Spain were crowned UEFA Euro 2008 champions.

== Qualification ==
The draw for the qualifying round took place in Montreux, Switzerland on 27 January 2006 at 12:00 CET.

The qualifying process commenced a month after the 2006 World Cup. Austria and Switzerland automatically qualified for the tournament finals as host nations.

The qualifying format was changed compared to previous tournaments. The winners and runners-up from seven groups automatically qualified for the Championship, with the hosts filling the other two slots in the 16-team tournament. The change means there were no play-offs between teams finishing in second place in the groups – they qualified directly for the finals. Teams that finished outside the top two positions in their groups failed to qualify. Group A contained eight teams, and the others contained seven.

12 out of 16 teams who qualified for previous tournament also qualified, but the hosts, Austria, and Poland made their debuts at the European Championship. Romania and Turkey returned after missing out the 2004 tournament. For the first time since 1984, all five teams from Great Britain and Ireland failed to qualify, including UEFA Euro 2004 and 2006 FIFA World Cup quarter-finalists England. Thus UEFA Euro 2008 was the first major tournament finals England had not qualified for since their failure to qualify for the 1994 FIFA World Cup . Other notable absentees were 2006 World Cup quarter-finalists Ukraine and Denmark, who failed to qualify for the first time since 1980. Bulgaria and Latvia also failed to qualify after playing in Euro 2004.

As of 2024, this is the last time England and Ukraine have failed to qualify for the European Championship.

=== Qualified teams ===
Team	Qualified as	Qualified on	Previous appearances in tournament (Note: Bold indicates champion for that year. Italic indicates host for that year.)
Austria	Co-host	12 December 2002	0 (debut)
Switzerland	Co-host	12 December 2002	2 (1996, 2004)
Germany (Note: From 1972 to 1988, Germany competed as West Germany.)	Group D runner-up	13 October 2007	9 (**1972**, 1976, **1980**, 1984, 1988, 1992, **1996**, 2000, 2004)
Greece	Group C winner	17 October 2007	2 (1980, **2004**)
Czech Republic (Note: From 1960 to 1980, the Czech Republic competed as Czechoslovakia.)	Group D winner	17 October 2007	6 (1960, **1976**, 1980, 1996, 2000, 2004)
Romania	Group G winner	17 October 2007	3 (1984, 1996, 2000)
Poland	Group A winner	17 November 2007	0 (debut)
Italy	Group B winner	17 November 2007	6 (**1968**, 1980, 1988, 1996, 2000, 2004)
France	Group B runner-up	17 November 2007	6 (1960, **1984**, 1992, 1996, **2000**, 2004)
Croatia	Group E winner	17 November 2007	2 (1996, 2004)
Spain	Group F winner	17 November 2007	7 (**1964**, 1980, 1984, 1988, 1996, 2000, 2004)
Netherlands	Group G runner-up	17 November 2007	7 (1976, 1980, **1988**, 1992, 1996, 2000, 2004)
Portugal	Group A runner-up	21 November 2007	4 (1984, 1996, 2000, 2004)
Turkey	Group C runner-up	21 November 2007	2 (1996, 2000)
Russia (Note: From 1960 to 1988, Russia competed as the Soviet Union, and in 1992 as CIS.)	Group E runner-up	21 November 2007	8 (**1960**, 1964, 1968, 1972, 1988, 1992, 1996, 2004)
Sweden	Group F runner-up	21 November 2007	3 (1992, 2000, 2004)

=== Final draw ===
The draw for the final tournament took place on 2 December 2007 at the Lucerne Culture and Congress Centre in Switzerland.

As was the case at the 2000 and 2004 finals, the finalists were divided into four seeding pots, based on the 2007 edition of the UEFA national team coefficient ranking, which measured performance of teams in the 2006 FIFA World Cup qualifying and Euro 2008 qualifying, with each group having one team drawn from each pot. In a return to the format used at Euro 1992 and Euro 1996 the games in each group were held at just two stadia, with the seeded team playing all three matches in the same city. Switzerland and Austria, as co-hosts, were automatically assigned to positions A1 and B1, respectively. The remaining 14 teams were split into four pots, with title-holders Greece seeded alongside the Netherlands in Pot 1.

UEFA came under heavy criticism from Raymond Domenech, manager of France, who was not satisfied with his team's position in the draw, and was also in favour of having 2006 FIFA World Cup winners Italy as top seed. On 22 November 2007, Giorgio Marchetti, UEFA's professional football director, announced that a review of the coefficient ranking system was under way for future European Championships.

Pot 1 (Note: Co-hosts Switzerland (coefficient 1.800; rank 20th) and Austria (coefficient 1.500; rank 27th) belonged to pot 1 irrespective of their ranking position. Ahead of the draw, they were removed from pot 1 and automatically assigned to group positions A1 and B1, respectively.)
Team	Coeff	Rank
Greece (holders) (Note: Defending champions Greece (coefficient 2.167; rank 11th) were automatically assigned to Pot 1, and could be drawn into either Group C or D.)	2.167	11
Netherlands	2.417	1

Pot 2
Team	Coeff	Rank
Croatia	2.409	2
Italy	2.364	3
Czech Republic	2.333	4
Sweden	2.273	5

Pot 3
Team	Coeff	Rank
Romania	2.250	6
Germany	2.250	7
Portugal	2.192	8
Spain	2.182	9

Pot 4
Team	Coeff	Rank
Poland	2.167	12
France	2.091	13
Turkey	1.958	14
Russia	1.958	15

Automatically selected as a top-seeded team into pot 1, irrespective of their ranking position.

All teams from each pot, were drawn consecutively into Group A to D. From Pot 1, the remaining two teams for Group C and Group D were first drawn. All Pot 1 teams automatically occupy the first positions of their groups. Next step was to draw all teams in the order from Pot 4, Pot 3 and Pot 2; and for these teams the next group positions 2/3/4 were drawn separately from an extra glass bowl, for the purposes of determining the match schedules in each group. Coincidentally, all teams from Pots 2, 3, and 4 drew the exact same group position number as their pot number.

The draw resulted in the following groups:

Group A Team Switzerland Czech Republic Portugal Turkey	Group B Team Austria Croatia Germany Poland	Group C Team Netherlands Italy Romania France	Group D Team Greece Sweden Spain Russia

== Venues ==
The tournament was played at eight venues throughout the two host nations; four in Austria and four in Switzerland. Each venue had a capacity of at least 30,000 for the tournament; the largest stadium was Ernst-Happel-Stadion in Vienna with a capacity of 53,295. It was for this reason that Ernst-Happel-Stadion hosted the final. Switzerland played all three group stage matches at St. Jakob Park in Basel, which also hosted the opening match of the tournament as a compromise for the final being held in Vienna. Austria played all of their group stage matches at Ernst-Happel-Stadion.

In 2004, the Zürich venue became a problem for the organisers. Originally, the Hardturm stadium was to be renovated and used as the city's venue, but legal challenges delayed the plan to a point that would not have allowed the ground to be used in 2008. This created a problem, as the agreement between UEFA and the organisers stipulated that four venues would be used in each country. The problem was solved when the organisers proposed renovating Letzigrund instead; UEFA approved the revised plan in January 2005. The Letzigrund stadium hosted its first football match on 23 September 2007.

Austria
Vienna	Klagenfurt	Innsbruck	Salzburg
Ernst-Happel-Stadion	Wörthersee Stadion	Tivoli-Neu	Stadion Wals-Siezenheim
Capacity: 51,428	Capacity: 31,957	Capacity: 31,600	Capacity: 31,895
Location of the host cities of the UEFA Euro 2008 in Austria and Switzerland.
Switzerland
Basel	Bern	Geneva	Zürich
St. Jakob-Park	Stade de Suisse	Stade de Genève	Letzigrund
Capacity: 42,500	Capacity: 31,907	Capacity: 31,228	Capacity: 30,930

=== Team base camps ===
Each team had access to a "team base camp" for its stay between the matches. The teams trained and resided in these locations during the tournament, and travelled to games that took place away from their bases. The 16 teams validated their option with UEFA on 18 December 2007.

Team	Base camp
Austria	Stegersbach
Croatia	Bad Tatzmannsdorf
Czech Republic	Seefeld in Tirol
France	Mont Pèlerin
Germany	Ascona
Greece	Hof bei Salzburg
Italy	Baden bei Wien
Netherlands	Lausanne
Poland	Bad Waltersdorf
Portugal	Neuchâtel
Romania	St. Gallen
Russia	Leogang
Spain	Neustift im Stubaital
Sweden	Lugano
Switzerland	Feusisberg
Turkey	Bellevue

== Squads ==
Teams were required to select a squad of 23 players, three of whom had to be goalkeepers, with the final squad to be submitted to UEFA by 28 May 2008. If a member of the final squad suffered an injury prior to his team's first game that would keep him out of the entire tournament, another player could be called up to replace him.

== Match officials ==
On 19 December 2007, UEFA announced twelve referees and twenty-four assistants were selected for the tournament. In April 2008, after failing a physical fitness test, Norwegian assistant referee Erik Ræstad was replaced by fellow countryman Jan Petter Randen. Italian referee Roberto Rosetti was selected to officiate both the opening match between Switzerland and the Czech Republic and the final between Germany and Spain.

Country	Referee	Assistants	Matches refereed
Austria	Konrad Plautz	Egon Bereuter; Markus Mayr	Spain 4–1 Russia, Switzerland 2–0 Portugal
Belgium	Frank De Bleeckere	Peter Hermans; Alex Verstraeten	Croatia 2–1 Germany, Russia 2–0 Sweden, Russia 0–3 Spain (semi-final)
England	Howard Webb	Darren Cann; Mike Mullarkey	Austria 1–1 Poland, Greece 1–2 Spain
Germany	Herbert Fandel	Carsten Kadach; Volker Wezel	Portugal 2–0 Turkey, Netherlands 4–1 France, Spain 0–0 Italy (quarter-final)
Greece	Kyros Vassaras	Dimitrios Bozatzidis; Dimitrios Saraidaris	Czech Republic 1–3 Portugal, Poland 0–1 Croatia
Italy	Roberto Rosetti	Alessandro Griselli; Paolo Calcagno	Switzerland 0–1 Czech Republic, Greece 0–1 Russia, Croatia 1–1 Turkey (quarter-final), Germany 0–1 Spain (final)
Netherlands	Pieter Vink	Adriaan Inia; Hans ten Hoove	Austria 0–1 Croatia, Sweden 1–2 Spain
Norway	Tom Henning Øvrebø	Geir Åge Holen; ~~Erik Ræstad~~; Jan Petter Randen	Germany 2–0 Poland, Italy 1–1 Romania
Slovakia	Ľuboš Micheľ	Roman Slyško; Martin Balko	Switzerland 1–2 Turkey, France 0–2 Italy, Netherlands 1–3 Russia (quarter-final)
Spain	Manuel Mejuto González	Juan Carlos Yuste Jiménez; Jesús Calvo Guadamuro	Romania 0–0 France, Austria 0–1 Germany
Sweden	Peter Fröjdfeldt	Stefan Wittberg; Henrik Andrén	Netherlands 3–0 Italy, Turkey 3–2 Czech Republic, Portugal 2–3 Germany (quarter-final)
Switzerland	Massimo Busacca	Matthias Arnet; Stéphane Cuhat	Greece 0–2 Sweden, Netherlands 2–0 Romania, Germany 3–2 Turkey (semi-final)

Fourth officials

Country	Fourth officials
Croatia	Ivan Bebek
France	Stéphane Lannoy
Hungary	Viktor Kassai
Iceland	Kristinn Jakobsson
Poland	Grzegorz Gilewski
Portugal	Olegário Benquerença
Scotland	Craig Thomson
Slovenia	Damir Skomina

== Group stage ==
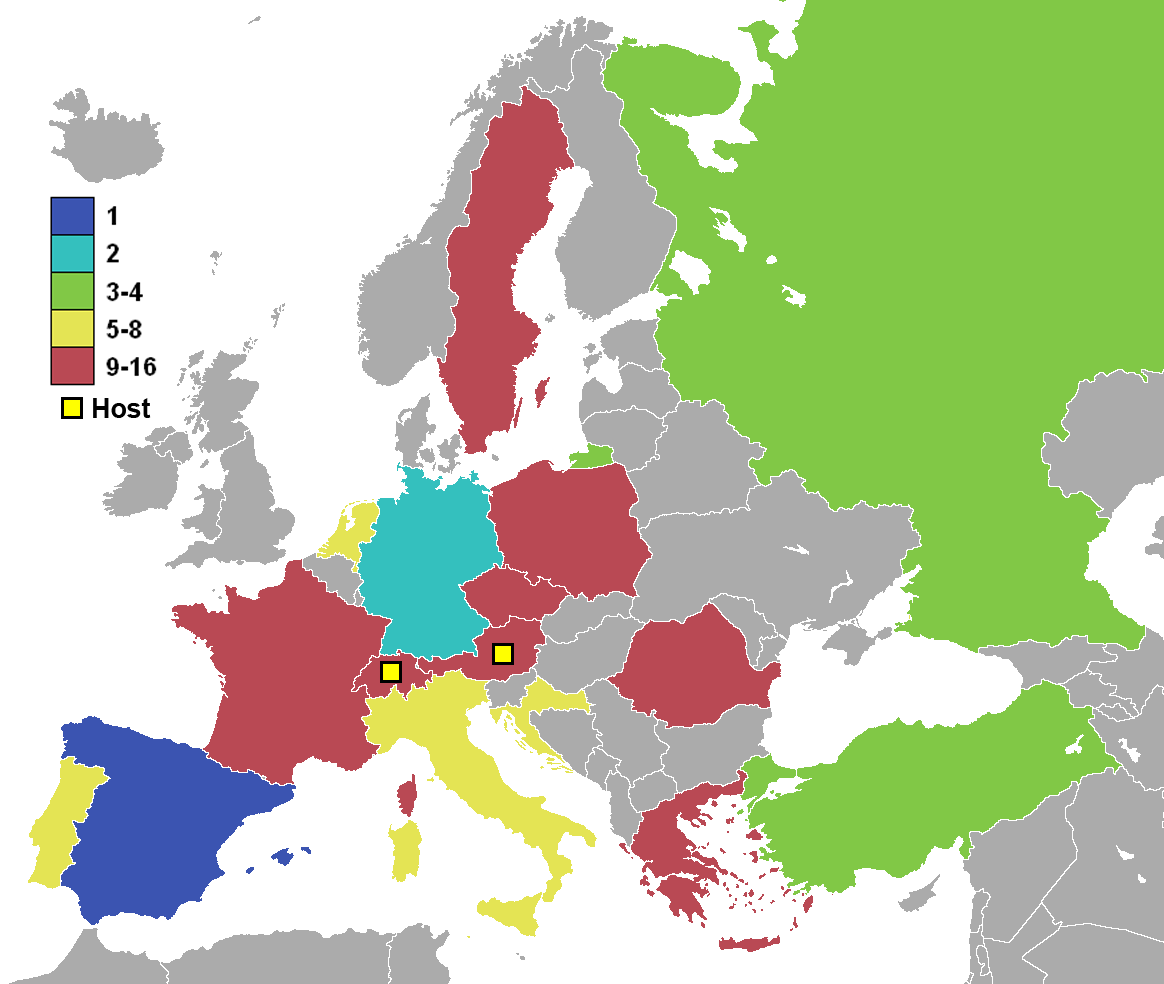
Performance of the participating countries during Euro 2008

The teams finishing in the top two positions in each of the four groups progressed to the quarter-finals, while the bottom two teams were eliminated from the tournament.

All times are local, CEST (UTC+2).

=== Tiebreakers ===
For the three-game group stage of this tournament, where two or more teams in a group tied on an equal number of points, the finishing positions were determined by the following tie-breaking criteria in the following order:

1. number of points obtained in the matches among the teams in question
2. goal difference in the matches among the teams in question (if more than two teams finish equal on points)
3. number of goals scored in the matches among the teams in question (if more than two teams finish equal on points)
4. goal difference in all the group matches
5. number of goals scored in all the group matches
6. coefficient from the qualifying competitions for the 2006 FIFA World Cup and 2006/08 UEFA European Football Championship (points obtained divided by the number of matches played)
7. fair play conduct of the teams (final tournament)
8. drawing of lots

However, these normal criteria would not apply if two teams tied on points, goal difference, goals scored, and goals conceded, played against each other in their final group match, drew that game, and no other team in the group finishes with the same number of points; in that case, the tie would be broken by a penalty shootout.

=== Group A ===
Pos	Team	Pld	W	D	L	GF	GA	GD	Pts	Qualification
1	Portugal	3	2	0	1	5	3	+2	6 (Note: Head-to-head result: Portugal 2–0 Turkey.)	Advance to knockout stage
2	Turkey	3	2	0	1	5	5	0	6	Advance to knockout stage
3	Czech Republic	3	1	0	2	4	6	−2	3 (Note: Head-to-head result: Switzerland 0–1 Czech Republic.)	
4	Switzerland (H)	3	1	0	2	3	3	0	3	

Source: UEFA
(H) Hosts
Notes:
7 June 2008
18:00

Switzerland	0–1	Czech Republic
	Report	Svěrkoš 71'

St. Jakob-Park, Basel
Attendance: 39,730
Referee: Roberto Rosetti (Italy)
7 June 2008
20:45

Portugal	2–0	Turkey
Pepe 61'; Meireles 90+3'	Report

Stade de Genève, Geneva
Attendance: 29,106
Referee: Herbert Fandel (Germany)

11 June 2008
18:00

Czech Republic	1–3	Portugal
Sionko 17'	Report	Deco 8'; Ronaldo 63'; Quaresma 90+1'

Stade de Genève, Geneva
Attendance: 29,016
Referee: Kyros Vassaras (Greece)
11 June 2008
20:45

Switzerland	1–2	Turkey
Yakin 32'	Report	Şentürk 57'; Turan 90+2'

St. Jakob-Park, Basel
Attendance: 39,730
Referee: Ľuboš Micheľ (Slovakia)

15 June 2008
20:45

Switzerland	2–0	Portugal
Yakin 71', 83' (pen.)	Report

St. Jakob-Park, Basel
Attendance: 39,730
Referee: Konrad Plautz (Austria)
15 June 2008
20:45

Turkey	3–2	Czech Republic
Turan 75'; Kahveci 87', 89'	Report	Koller 34'; Plašil 62'

Stade de Genève, Geneva
Attendance: 29,016
Referee: Peter Fröjdfeldt (Sweden)

=== Group B ===
Pos	Team	Pld	W	D	L	GF	GA	GD	Pts	Qualification
1	Croatia	3	3	0	0	4	1	+3	9	Advance to knockout stage
2	Germany	3	2	0	1	4	2	+2	6	Advance to knockout stage
3	Austria (H)	3	0	1	2	1	3	−2	1 (Note: Tied on head-to-head result (Austria 1–1 Poland). Overall goal difference was used as the tiebreaker.)	
4	Poland	3	0	1	2	1	4	−3	1	

Source: UEFA
(H) Hosts
Notes:
8 June 2008
18:00

Austria	0–1	Croatia
	Report	Modrić 4' (pen.)

Ernst-Happel-Stadion, Vienna
Attendance: 51,428
Referee: Pieter Vink (Netherlands)
8 June 2008
20:45

Germany	2–0	Poland
Podolski 20', 72'	Report

Wörthersee Stadion, Klagenfurt
Attendance: 30,461
Referee: Tom Henning Øvrebø (Norway)

12 June 2008
18:00

Croatia	2–1	Germany
Srna 24'; Olić 62'	Report	Podolski 79'

Wörthersee Stadion, Klagenfurt
Attendance: 30,461
Referee: Frank De Bleeckere (Belgium)
12 June 2008
20:45

Austria	1–1	Poland
Vastić 90+3' (pen.)	Report	Guerreiro 30'

Ernst-Happel-Stadion, Vienna
Attendance: 51,428
Referee: Howard Webb (England)

16 June 2008
20:45

Poland	0–1	Croatia
	Report	Klasnić 53'

Wörthersee Stadion, Klagenfurt
Attendance: 30,461
Referee: Kyros Vassaras (Greece)
16 June 2008
20:45

Austria	0–1	Germany
	Report	Ballack 49'

Ernst-Happel-Stadion, Vienna
Attendance: 51,428
Referee: Manuel Mejuto González (Spain)

=== Group C ===
Pos	Team	Pld	W	D	L	GF	GA	GD	Pts	Qualification
1	Netherlands	3	3	0	0	9	1	+8	9	Advance to knockout stage
2	Italy	3	1	1	1	3	4	−1	4	Advance to knockout stage
3	Romania	3	0	2	1	1	3	−2	2	
4	France	3	0	1	2	1	6	−5	1	

Source: UEFA
9 June 2008
18:00

Romania	0–0	France
	Report

Letzigrund, Zürich
Attendance: 30,585
Referee: Manuel Mejuto González (Spain)
9 June 2008
20:45

Netherlands	3–0	Italy
Van Nistelrooy 26'; Sneijder 31'; Van Bronckhorst 79'	Report

Stade de Suisse, Bern
Attendance: 30,777
Referee: Peter Fröjdfeldt (Sweden)

13 June 2008
18:00

Italy	1–1	Romania
Panucci 56'	Report	Mutu 55'

Letzigrund, Zürich
Attendance: 30,585
Referee: Tom Henning Øvrebø (Norway)
13 June 2008
20:45

Netherlands	4–1	France
Kuyt 9'; Van Persie 59'; Robben 72'; Sneijder 90+2'	Report	Henry 71'

Stade de Suisse, Bern
Attendance: 30,777
Referee: Herbert Fandel (Germany)

17 June 2008
20:45

Netherlands	2–0	Romania
Huntelaar 54'; Van Persie 87'	Report

Stade de Suisse, Bern
Attendance: 30,777
Referee: Massimo Busacca (Switzerland)
17 June 2008
20:45

France	0–2	Italy
	Report	Pirlo 25' (pen.); De Rossi 62'

Letzigrund, Zürich
Attendance: 30,585
Referee: Ľuboš Micheľ (Slovakia)

=== Group D ===
Pos	Team	Pld	W	D	L	GF	GA	GD	Pts	Qualification
1	Spain	3	3	0	0	8	3	+5	9	Advance to knockout stage
2	Russia	3	2	0	1	4	4	0	6	Advance to knockout stage
3	Sweden	3	1	0	2	3	4	−1	3	
4	Greece	3	0	0	3	1	5	−4	0	

Source: UEFA
10 June 2008
18:00

Spain	4–1	Russia
Villa 20', 44', 75'; Fàbregas 90+1'	Report	Pavlyuchenko 86'

Tivoli-Neu, Innsbruck
Attendance: 30,772
Referee: Konrad Plautz (Austria)
10 June 2008
20:45

Greece	0–2	Sweden
	Report	Ibrahimović 67'; Hansson 72'

Stadion Wals-Siezenheim, Salzburg
Attendance: 31,063
Referee: Massimo Busacca (Switzerland)

14 June 2008
18:00

Sweden	1–2	Spain
Ibrahimović 34'	Report	Torres 15'; Villa 90+2'

Tivoli-Neu, Innsbruck
Attendance: 30,772
Referee: Pieter Vink (Netherlands)
14 June 2008
20:45

Greece	0–1	Russia
	Report	Zyryanov 33'

Stadion Wals-Siezenheim, Salzburg
Attendance: 31,063
Referee: Roberto Rosetti (Italy)

18 June 2008
20:45

Greece	1–2	Spain
Charisteas 42'	Report	De la Red 61'; Güiza 88'

Stadion Wals-Siezenheim, Salzburg
Attendance: 30,883
Referee: Howard Webb (England)
18 June 2008
20:45

Russia	2–0	Sweden
Pavlyuchenko 24'; Arshavin 50'	Report

Tivoli-Neu, Innsbruck
Attendance: 30,772
Referee: Frank De Bleeckere (Belgium)

== Knockout stage ==
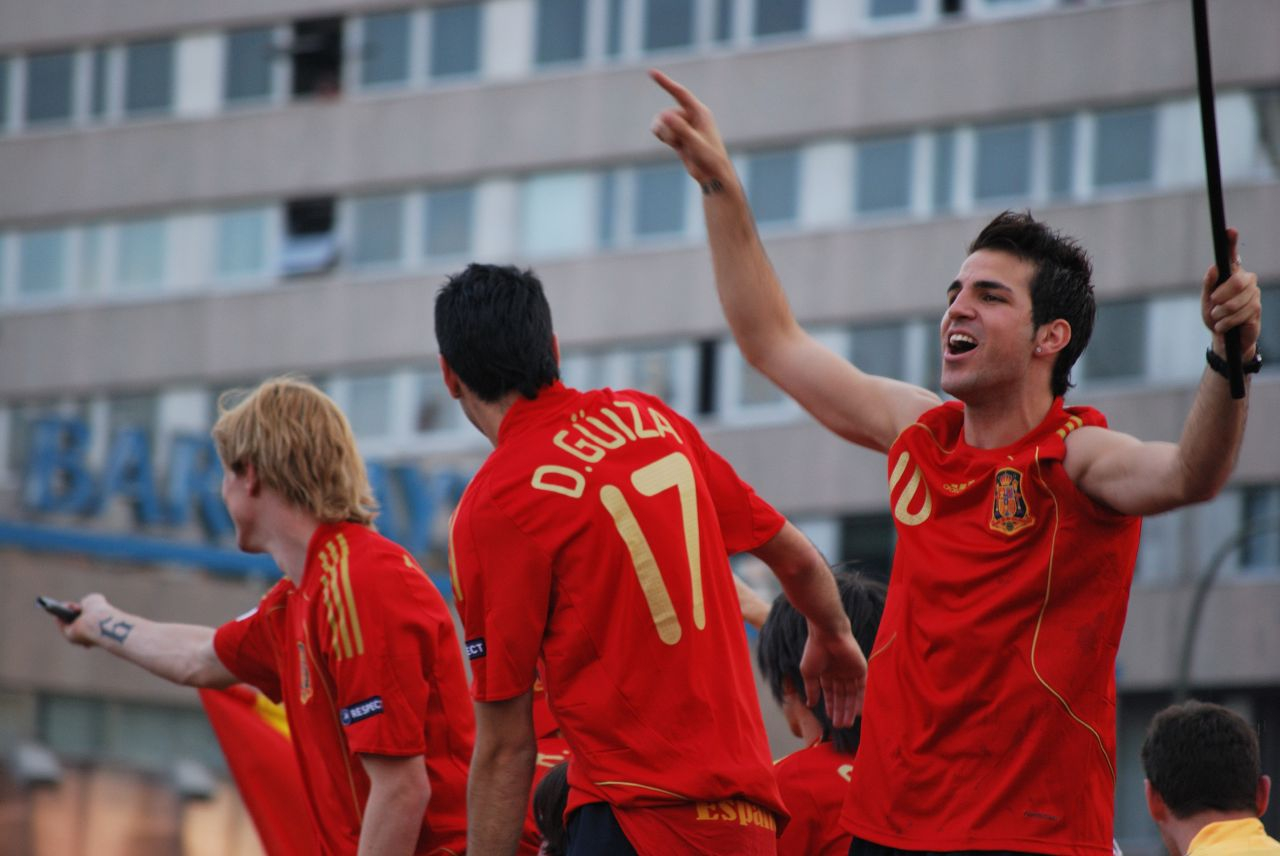
Cesc Fàbregas celebrating Spain's Euro 2008 title

The knockout stage was different from that of past tournaments. Teams in groups A and B were separated from teams in groups C and D until the final. This meant that two teams who meet in the same group would meet again in the semi-finals instead of the final if they got this far. Also, in another major change, for the first time in a European Championship, only two venues (St. Jakob-Park, Basel and Ernst-Happel-Stadion, Vienna—the two largest of the eight stadiums used) were used for the seven matches in the knockout stage of the tournament.

As with every tournament since UEFA Euro 1984, there was no third place play-off.

All times are local, CEST (UTC+2).

=== Bracket ===
Quarter-finals
19 June – Basel
Portugal	2
Germany	3
20 June – Vienna
Croatia	1 (1)
Turkey (p)	1 (3)
21 June – Basel
Netherlands	1
Russia (a.e.t.)	3
22 June – Vienna
Spain (p)	0 (4)
Italy	0 (2)

Semi-finals
25 June – Basel
Germany	3
Turkey	2
26 June – Vienna
Russia	0
Spain	3

Final
29 June – Vienna
Germany	0
Spain	1

=== Quarter-finals ===
19 June 2008
20:45

Portugal	2–3	Germany
Nuno Gomes 40'; Postiga 87'	Report	Schweinsteiger 22'; Klose 26'; Ballack 61'

St. Jakob-Park, Basel
Attendance: 39,374
Referee: Peter Fröjdfeldt (Sweden)

20 June 2008
20:45

Croatia	1–1 (a.e.t.)	Turkey
Klasnić 119'	Report	Şentürk 120+2'
Penalties
Modrić (penalty missed); Srna (penalty scored); Rakitić (penalty missed); Petrić (penalty missed)	1–3	(penalty scored) Turan; (penalty scored) Şentürk; (penalty scored) Altıntop

Ernst-Happel-Stadion, Vienna
Attendance: 51,428
Referee: Roberto Rosetti (Italy)

21 June 2008
20:45

Netherlands	1–3 (a.e.t.)	Russia
Van Nistelrooy 86'	Report	Pavlyuchenko 56'; Torbinski 112'; Arshavin 116'

St. Jakob-Park, Basel
Attendance: 38,374
Referee: Ľuboš Micheľ (Slovakia)

22 June 2008
20:45

Spain	0–0 (a.e.t.)	Italy
	Report
Penalties
Villa (penalty scored); Cazorla (penalty scored); Senna (penalty scored); Güiza (penalty missed); Fàbregas (penalty scored)	4–2	(penalty scored) Grosso; (penalty missed) De Rossi; (penalty scored) Camoranesi; (penalty missed) Di Natale

Ernst-Happel-Stadion, Vienna
Attendance: 51,178
Referee: Herbert Fandel (Germany)

=== Semi-finals ===
25 June 2008
20:45

Germany	3–2	Turkey
Schweinsteiger 26'; Klose 79'; Lahm 90'	Report	Boral 22'; Şentürk 86'

St. Jakob-Park, Basel
Attendance: 39,374
Referee: Massimo Busacca (Switzerland)

26 June 2008
20:45

Russia	0–3	Spain
	Report	Xavi 50'; Güiza 73'; Silva 82'

Ernst-Happel-Stadion, Vienna
Attendance: 51,428
Referee: Frank De Bleeckere (Belgium)

=== Final ===
29 June 2008
20:45

Germany	0–1	Spain
	Report	Torres 33'

Ernst-Happel-Stadion, Vienna
Attendance: 51,428
Referee: Roberto Rosetti (Italy)

== Statistics ==
=== Goalscorers ===
There were 77 goals scored in 31 matches, for an average of 2.48 goals per match.

4 goals

- (Spain) David Villa

3 goals

- (Germany) Lukas Podolski
- (Russia) Roman Pavlyuchenko
- (Switzerland) Hakan Yakin
- (Turkey) Semih Şentürk

2 goals

- (Croatia) Ivan Klasnić
- (Germany) Michael Ballack
- (Germany) Miroslav Klose
- (Germany) Bastian Schweinsteiger
- (Netherlands) Wesley Sneijder
- (Netherlands) Ruud van Nistelrooy
- (Netherlands) Robin van Persie
- (Russia) Andrey Arshavin
- (Spain) Dani Güiza
- (Spain) Fernando Torres
- (Sweden) Zlatan Ibrahimović
- (Turkey) Nihat Kahveci
- (Turkey) Arda Turan

1 goal

- (Austria) Ivica Vastić
- (Croatia) Luka Modrić
- (Croatia) Ivica Olić
- (Croatia) Darijo Srna
- (Czech Republic) Jan Koller
- (Czech Republic) Jaroslav Plašil
- (Czech Republic) Libor Sionko
- (Czech Republic) Václav Svěrkoš
- (France) Thierry Henry
- (Germany) Philipp Lahm
- (Greece) Angelos Charisteas
- (Italy) Daniele De Rossi
- (Italy) Christian Panucci
- (Italy) Andrea Pirlo
- (Netherlands) Klaas-Jan Huntelaar
- (Netherlands) Dirk Kuyt
- (Netherlands) Arjen Robben
- (Netherlands) Giovanni van Bronckhorst
- (Poland) Roger Guerreiro
- (Portugal) Deco
- (Portugal) Nuno Gomes
- (Portugal) Raul Meireles
- (Portugal) Pepe
- (Portugal) Hélder Postiga
- (Portugal) Ricardo Quaresma
- (Portugal) Cristiano Ronaldo
- (Romania) Adrian Mutu
- (Russia) Dmitri Torbinski
- (Russia) Konstantin Zyryanov
- (Spain) Rubén de la Red
- (Spain) Cesc Fàbregas
- (Spain) David Silva
- (Spain) Xavi
- (Sweden) Petter Hansson
- (Turkey) Uğur Boral

=== Awards ===
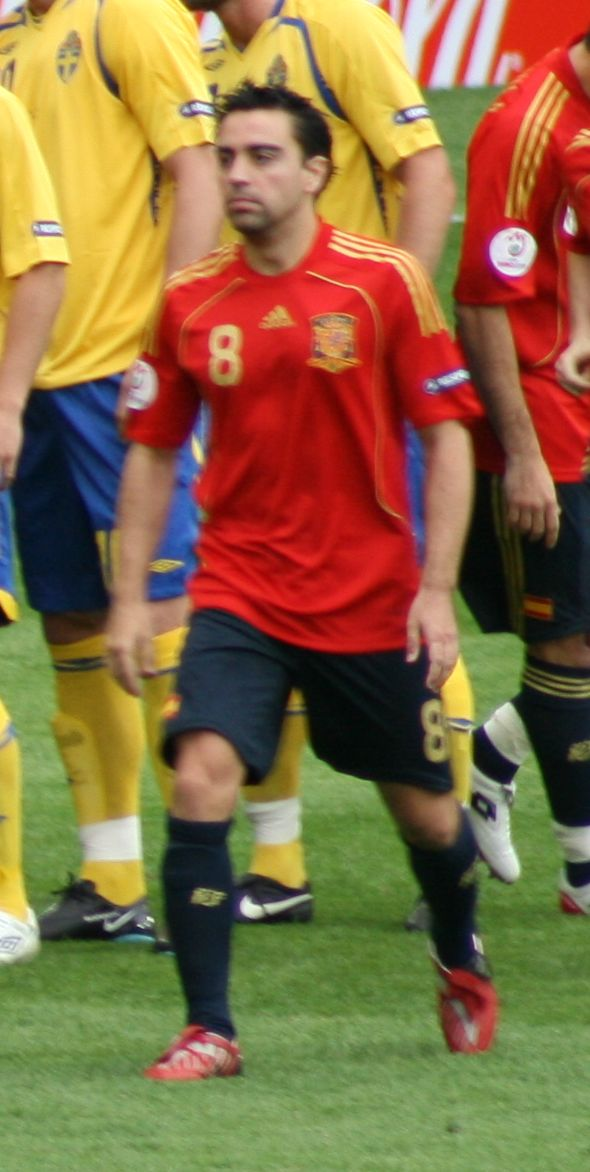
Spain midfielder Xavi was selected as the Player of the Tournament.

==== UEFA Team of the Tournament ====
The UEFA Technical Team was charged with naming a squad composed of the 23 best players over the course of the tournament. The group of nine analysts watched every game at the tournament before making their decision after the final. Nine players from the winning Spanish team were named in the team of the tournament, while no players knocked out in the group stage were included. Four players from semi-finalists Russia were also included, the first time ever there were Russian players in the Team of the Tournament following the fall of the Soviet Union.

Goalkeepers	Defenders	Midfielders	Forwards
(Italy) Gianluigi Buffon (Netherlands) Edwin van der Sar (Spain) Iker Casillas	(Germany) Philipp Lahm (Portugal) José Bosingwa (Portugal) Pepe (Russia) Yuri Zhirkov (Spain) Carlos Marchena (Spain) Carles Puyol	(Croatia) Luka Modrić (Germany) Michael Ballack (Germany) Lukas Podolski (Netherlands) Wesley Sneijder (Russia) Konstantin Zyryanov (Spain) Cesc Fàbregas (Spain) Andrés Iniesta (Spain) Marcos Senna (Spain) Xavi (Turkey) Hamit Altıntop	(Russia) Andrey Arshavin (Russia) Roman Pavlyuchenko (Spain) Fernando Torres (Spain) David Villa

==== UEFA Player of the Tournament ====
The UEFA Technical Team also had to pick a Player of the Tournament, taking fans' votes into account. The player chosen was Spain midfielder Xavi.

- (Spain) Xavi

==== Golden Boot ====
The Golden Boot was awarded to yet another Spaniard, David Villa, who scored four goals, three of which came in his side's 4–1 win over Russia (the only hat-trick scored in the tournament).

- (Spain) David Villa (4 goals)

=== Prize money ===
UEFA announced that total of €184 million has been offered to the 16 teams competing in this tournament, increasing from €129 million in the previous tournament. The distributions as below:

- Prize for participating: €7.5 million

Extra payment based on teams performances:

- Winner: €7.5 million
- Runner-up: €4.5 million
- Semi-finals: €3 million
- Quarter-finals: €2 million
- Group stage (per match):
  - Win: €1 million
  - Draw: €500,000

Spain, as winners of the tournament and winners of all three of their group stage matches, received a total prize of €23 million, the maximum possible prize money. Greece on the other hand, being the only team to lose all three of their group matches, were the only team to receive nothing more than the €7.5 million participation prize.

=== Discipline ===
At UEFA Euro 2008, players were suspended from playing in subsequent matches upon the collection of a certain number of yellow or red cards. If a player was shown a red card – whether as a result of two bookable offences or a straight red – that player got suspended from playing in his team's next match. If his team was eliminated from the competition before the end of his suspension, the games carried over to the 2010 FIFA World Cup qualification matches. A player was also suspended for one match for picking up two yellow cards in separate matches. However, any yellow cards accumulated were annulled once a team got eliminated from the tournament or reached the semi-finals.

In extreme cases of ill-discipline, UEFA could choose to have a disciplinary panel examine the incident in order to determine whether or not further suspension is required. One case of this at Euro 2008 was the suspension of Turkey goalkeeper Volkan Demirel for two matches for pushing Czech striker Jan Koller.

The following players were suspended for one or more games as a result of red cards or yellow card accumulation:

Player	Offence(s)	Suspension(s)
(Russia) Andrey Arshavin	(red card) in Euro qualifying v Andorra	Group D v Spain; Group D v Greece
(Germany) Bastian Schweinsteiger	(red card) in Group B v Croatia	Group B v Austria
(Austria) Sebastian Prödl	(yellow card) in Group B v Croatia; (yellow card) in Group B v Poland	Group B v Germany
(Romania) Dorin Goian	(yellow card) in Group C v France; (yellow card) in Group C v Italy	Group C v Netherlands
(Turkey) Mehmet Aurélio	(yellow card) in Group A v Switzerland; (yellow card) in Group A v Czech Republic	Quarter-final v Croatia
(Turkey) Volkan Demirel	(red card) in Group A v Czech Republic	Quarter-final v Croatia; Semi-final v Germany
(France) Eric Abidal	(red card) in Group C v Italy	World Cup qualifying v Austria
(Italy) Andrea Pirlo	(yellow card) in Group C v Romania; (yellow card) in Group C v France	Quarter-final v Spain
(Italy) Gennaro Gattuso	(yellow card) in Group C v Netherlands; (yellow card) in Group C v France	Quarter-final v Spain
(Turkey) Tuncay Şanlı	(yellow card) in Group A v Switzerland; (yellow card) in Quarter-final v Croatia	Semi-final v Germany
(Turkey) Arda Turan	(yellow card) in Group A v Czech Republic; (yellow card) in Quarter-final v Croatia	Semi-final v Germany
(Turkey) Emre Aşık	(yellow card) in Group A v Czech Republic; (yellow card) in Quarter-final v Croatia	Semi-final v Germany
(Russia) Denis Kolodin	(yellow card) in Group D v Sweden; (yellow card) in Quarter-final v Netherlands	Semi-final v Spain
(Russia) Dmitri Torbinski	(yellow card) in Group D v Greece; (yellow card) in Quarter-final v Netherlands	Semi-final v Spain

== Marketing ==
=== Television coverage failure ===
Three times in the second half of the semi-final between Germany and Turkey, nearly the entire global television coverage of the game was interrupted. A thunderstorm over Vienna caused technical difficulties in the International Broadcast Centre (IBC), which relayed the television feed from the match in Basel, Switzerland, resulting in one or more goals being missed by various audiences. Various national broadcasters took emergency contingency measures such as reverting to radio broadcasting – for example, the BBC used coverage from BBC Radio 5 Live, Ireland circumvented the problem by having RTÉ Two's studio presenter Bill O'Herlihy and panellists Eamon Dunphy, Johnny Giles and Liam Brady provide emergency discussion on what had happened in the match, and Øyvind Alsaker, commentator from Norwegian TV2 picked up his mobile and filmed it over a 3G connection. Only the Swiss public broadcaster SRG SSR maintained full coverage since it used a direct signal other than the IBC's. ZDF, which was carrying the game in Germany, took advantage of this and switched to the signal of SF to restore pictures before any goals were missed, while their reporter Béla Réthy continued to provide commentary via telephone.

=== New trophy ===
A new trophy was awarded to the winners of the Euro 2008 tournament. The new version of the Henri Delaunay Trophy, created by Asprey London, is almost an exact replica of the original designed by Arthus-Bertrand. A small figure juggling a ball on the back of the original has been removed, as has the marble plinth. The silver base of the trophy also had to be enlarged to make it stable. The names of the winning countries that had appeared on the plinth have now been engraved on the back of the trophy, which is made of sterling silver, weighs 8 kilograms (17.6 lb) and is 60 centimetres (24 in) tall.

=== Match ball ===
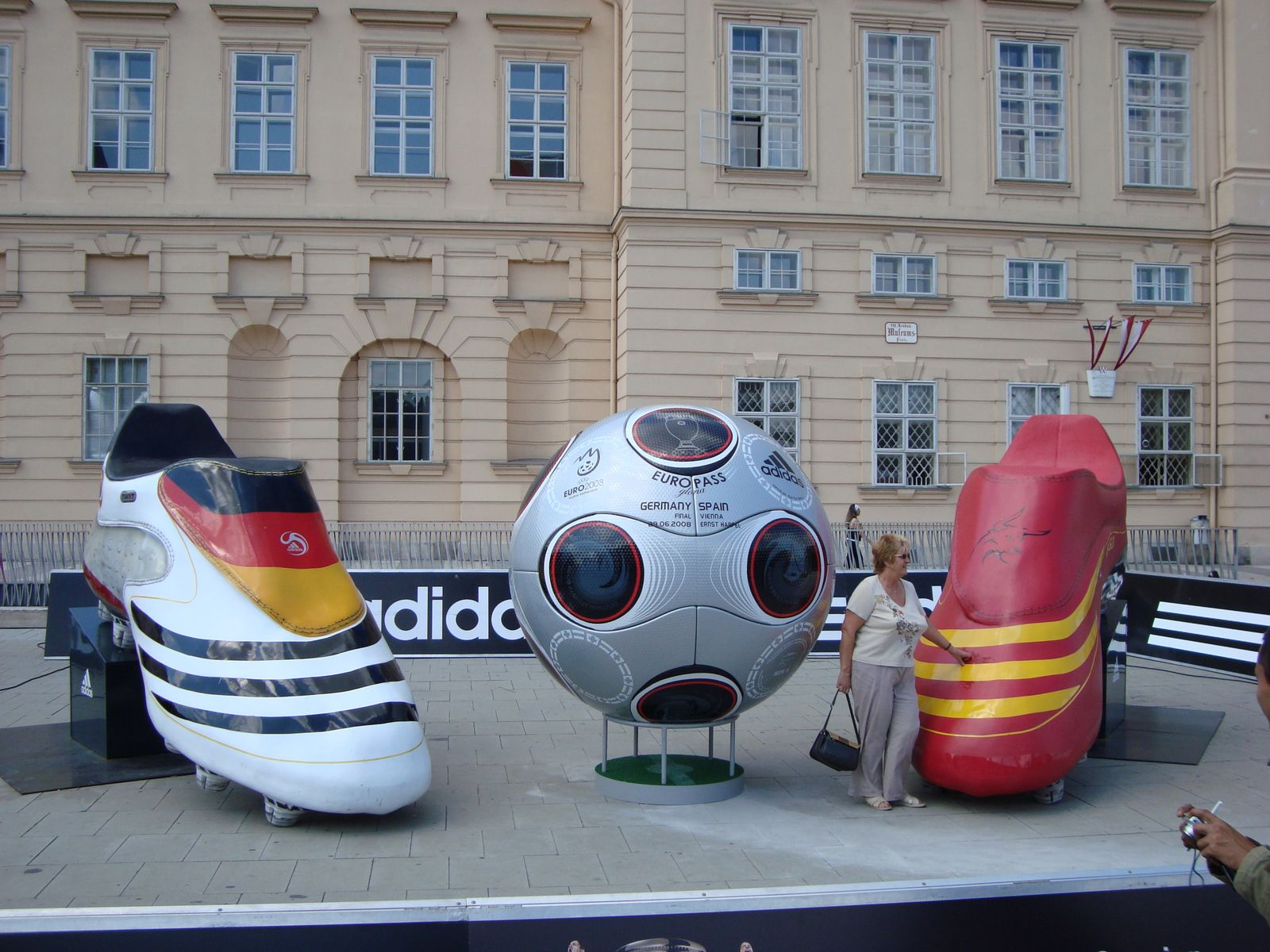
A large model of the adidas Europass prior to the final between Germany and Spain

The match ball for the finals was unveiled at the draw ceremony. Produced by Adidas and named the Europass, it is a 14-panel ball in the same construction as the Teamgeist, but with a modified surface design. A version named the Europass Gloria was used in the final.

There were concerns raised about the match ball, which was claimed to deviate unpredictably in flight, making it difficult to judge for goalkeepers. Notable players to criticise were Germany's Jens Lehmann and the Czech Republic's Petr Čech. These claims were disputed by the ball's designer, Oliver Kahn.

=== Music ===
The official melody was composed by Rollo Armstrong of Faithless on behalf of UEFA. The official Euro 2008 song was "Can You Hear Me" by Enrique Iglesias, which was performed live during the official closing ceremony prior to the final in Ernst Happel Stadion in Vienna on 29 June.

Two soundtracks, "Like a Superstar" and "Feel the Rush," were recorded by Jamaican reggae artist Shaggy as mascot songs for Euro 2008. They formed a musical background to video clips featuring the twin mascots Trix and Flix.

The official Swiss song for the tournament was a new version of "Bring en hei" (Bring him Home) by Baschi. Christina Stürmer sang the official tournament song of Austrian ÖFB, "Fieber" (Fever). Croatia manager Slaven Bilić recorded his country's official Euro 2008 song, "Vatreno ludilo" ("Fiery Madness"), with his rock group, Rawbau.

"Seven Nation Army" by The White Stripes was played when players walked out before kick-off, and a remix of "Samba de Janeiro" by German dance group Bellini was played after each goal scored in the competition.

=== Mascots ===
The two official mascots for UEFA Euro 2008, were named after a vote from the public of the two host nations from the following options:

- Zigi and Zagi
- Flitz and Bitz
- Trix and Flix

In April 2007, after receiving 36.3% of the vote, Trix and Flix were chosen. "I am sure the mascots and their names will become a vital part of the understanding of the whole event," said Christian Mutschler, the tournament director for Switzerland. The mascots were unveiled on 27 September 2006, in Vienna, Austria. Their official début was on 11 October 2006, at the Austria vs. Switzerland friendly, which ended 2–1.

=== Slogan ===
The slogan for UEFA Euro 2008 was chosen on 24 January 2007: Expect Emotions. UEFA President Michel Platini stated, "It describes in a nutshell what the UEFA Euro 2008 has to offer: all kinds of emotions – joy, disappointment, relief or high tension – right up to the final whistle."

=== Sponsorship ===
Global Sponsors:

- Adidas
- Canon Inc
- Carlsberg Group
- Castrol
- Coca-Cola
- Continental
- Hyundai Motor Group/Kia Corporation
- JVC
- MasterCard
- McDonald's

National Supporters (Switzerland):

- UBS
- Swisscom
- Ferrero Switzerland (Kinder Chocolate, Nutella, Ferrero Rocher)

National Supporters (Austria):

- Telekom austria
- Österreichische Post
- UniCredit

Hublot were the official watch and timekeeper of the tournament, while Intersport became the official retail licensee.

BenQ were initially announced as one of the global sponsors of the tournament, shortly after its mobile phone branch in Germany filed for insolvency. The deal was later cancelled.
