= Food combining =

Pseudoscientific view of meal composition

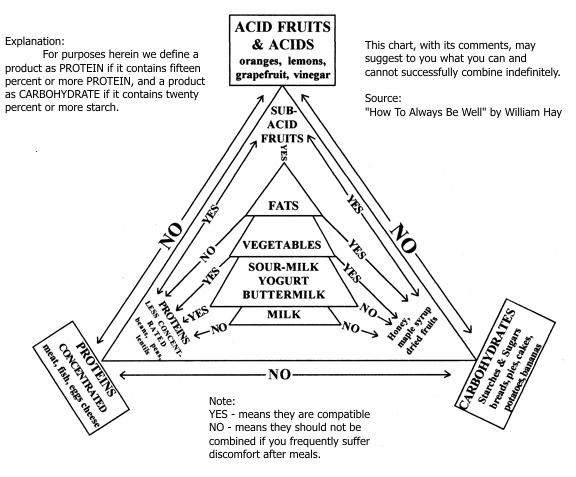
Chart from How to Always Be Well (1967), by William Howard Hay, showing which foods he believed should not be combined in a single meal

Food combining is a nutritional pseudoscientific approach that advocates specific combinations (or advises against certain combinations) of foods. These proposed specific combinations are promoted as central to good health as well as improved digestion and weight loss, despite having no sufficient evidence for these claims. It proposes a list of rules that advocate for eating or not eating certain foods together, including to avoid eating starches and proteins together; always eat fruit before, and not after, a meal; avoid eating fruits and vegetables together in the same meal; and to not drink cold water during a meal.

Food combining was originally promoted by Herbert M. Shelton in his book Food Combining Made Easy (1951), but the issue had been previously discussed by Edgar Cayce. The best-known food-combining diet is the Hay Diet, named after William Howard Hay. He lost 30 pounds in 3 months when he implemented his research. In recent years, the food combining diet was popularized in online spaces by social media influencer Kenzie Burke, who promoted and profited from the fad diet through the sale of her "21-Day Reset" program.

The promotion of food combining is not based on facts, making claims that have no scientific backing and displaying some characteristics of pseudoscience. Kenzie Burke utilizes a multitude of positive testimonials for her 21-Day Reset program that detail various customers' stories of success with the program. One randomized controlled trial of food combining was performed in 2000, and found no evidence that food combining was any more effective than a "balanced" diet in promoting weight loss. Besides this study, there is minimal legitimate scientific research on food combining as a diet, and subsequently no sufficient amount of legitimate scientific evidence for any of the diet's claims and any benefits it could potentially have for one's health.

== See also ==
- Protein combining
- Alkaline diet
- Fit for Life
- Foodpairing
- Gracie Diet
- Michel Montignac
- Raw foodism
- List of diets
