= Rasmus Larssen Alsaker =

American physician

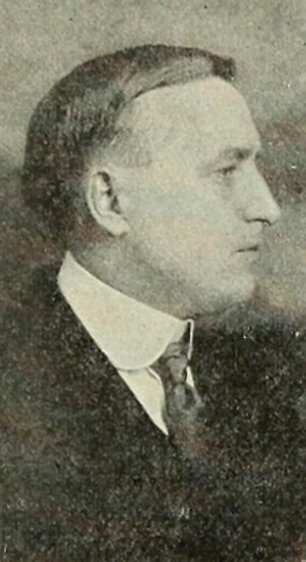
- Born: 1883; Norway
- Died: June 14, 1960 (aged 76–77); St. Petersburg, Florida
- Occupations: Physician, writer

Rasmus Larssen Alsaker (1883 – June 14, 1960) was a Norwegian American physician and alternative health writer.

== History ==
Alsaker was born in Norway. He obtained his M.D. from Bennett Medical College of Chicago in 1910. He received his licenses to practice medicine in Illinois and Colorado (1910) and in Missouri (1915).

He was Health Director at the Sun-Diet Health Foundation in East Aurora, New York; he was William Howard Hay's successor in the position. Alsaker wrote a series of books teaching the "Alsaker Way" for health. Alsaker believed that his dietary method could cure practically all diseases. Medical experts warned that Alsaker was misleading the public to self-diagnose and self-treat diseases of the heart. A review noted that his views were near quackery and consist of "5 per cent banalities of elementary science and 95 per cent pseudo-scientific buncombe."

Alsaker was the medical director for Bernarr Macfadden's Health Service Bureau and was an editor of the Health Culture magazine. He also edited The Key to Health magazine. Alsaker retired and moved to Florida in 1956. He was an amateur malacologist and collected volutidae shells.

== Death ==
He died on June 14, 1960, at St. Petersburg, Florida.

== Selected publications ==
- Conquering Consumption (1917)
- Curing Constipation and Appendicitis (1917)
- Dieting, Diabetes and Bright's Disease (1917)
- Getting Rid of Rheumatism (1917)
- How to Live on 3 Meals a Day (1917)
- Curing Diseases of Heart and Arteries (1918)
- Maintaining Health (1920)
- Eating for Health and Efficiency (1921)
- Outwitting Old Age (1926)
- Adventures in Cooking (1927)
- The Master Key to Health (1932)
- Health Via Food (William Howard Hay, edited and revised by Rasmus Alsaker, 1934)
- Eat Well--Live Long! (1939)
- Your Heart and Arteries: How to Avoid Sudden Death (1939)
- Victory Over Arthritis (1956)
- Conquering Colds and Sinus Infections (1967)
