= National Radium Trust =

The National Radium Trust was a British quasi-governmental organisation, set up on 25 July 1929, and abolished with the introduction of the NHS in 1948. It was intended to collect funding from the general public, and use it for supplying radium and other radiotherapeutic devices, to treat sick people in Great Britain.
