= Beverly Hills Diet =

Fad diet

The Beverly Hills Diet is a fad diet developed by author Judy Mazel (1943–2007) in her 1981 bestseller, The Beverly Hills Diet.

== History ==
Mazel had tried and failed to lose weight with existing programs, and developed the diet plan after spending six months working together with a nutritionist in Santa Fe, New Mexico. Under her program, she was able to trim down from a weight of 180 pounds (82 kg) to 108 pounds (49 kg), having struggled with her weight since childhood. After completing development of the program and returning to Los Angeles, she opened a weight-loss clinic whose clients included a number of celebrities.

The Beverly Hills Diet is predicated on the enzymatic actions of foods in the digestive process, and controlled weight by controlling when foods were eaten and in what combinations. The plan begins with the consumption of a series of specified fruits in a designated order for the initial ten days of the program. On Days 11 to 18, the dieter can add bread, two tablespoons of butter and three cobs of corn. Sources of complete protein, such as steak or lobster, cannot be consumed until Day 19 of the plan.

The diet divides food into three groups: carbohydrates, proteins, and fats. The carbohydrate category is further divided into subgroups, including "fruits" as well as three levels of carbohydrates. Wine is placed in the fruits subcategory, while most other alcoholic beverages are placed in the "maxi-carb" subcategory based on the claim that other alcoholic beverages take longest to digest. The diet argues that carbohydrates and proteins should never be combined or eaten on the same day.

The book, published by Macmillan Publishing, spent 30 weeks on The New York Times bestseller list, and sold more than one million copies. The book featured endorsements from Linda Gray, Engelbert Humperdinck, Sally Kellerman and Mary Ann Mobley.

The New Beverly Hills Diet, an updated version of the original diet, was released in a 1996 book also by Mazel. The original diet details a 42-day dieting plan, while the updated version is only 35 days long. The New Beverly Hills Diet also contains a long-term diet for dieters who have finished the 35-day regimen. The long-term diet contains similarly strict rules about what foods are eaten in combination. For example, Mazel argues fruit must be eaten on its own, and that dieter should wait at least an hour before eating different types of fruit.

== Reception ==
The Beverly Hills Diet is categorized as a fad diet. It has been described by nutrition experts as quackery and based on the discredited idea of food combining. Nutritionist Theodore P. Labuza noted that the diet is unbalanced with potential hazards such as diarrhea, potassium deficiency and heart arrhythmia, thus should be avoided.

Nutritional experts note that although the diet may induce weight loss, this only happens because of the lack of calories and lack of nutritional value. Dietitians note that the strict rules as well as the lack of nutrition in The Beverly Hills Diet can make the diet difficult to maintain. Experts generally agree that the most effective diets are those that can be easily sustained and they point to other healthier, easier, and more effective weight loss options instead of The Beverly Hills Diet.

A report published in the Journal of the American Medical Association in 1981 criticized the diet, noting significant inaccuracies that could result in physical harm to those following the regimen. The report, written by Dr. Gabe Mirkin of the University of Maryland, College Park and Dr. Ronald Shore of Johns Hopkins University, pointed out that there was no evidence supporting the scientific validity of the program and that it stood in opposition to established knowledge in the medical profession about nutrition, calling it "the latest, and perhaps the worst, entry in the diet-fad derby". The doctors were critical of the diet's claim that weight gain results from undigested food that is stuck in the body. The article expressed concerns about the combination of large amounts of fruit with little salt, noting that significant water loss from diarrhea could produce fever, muscle weakness, and a rapid pulse, and that blood pressure could drop low enough to cause death.

== See also ==
- List of diets
