= Øyvind Alsaker =

Norwegian sports broadcaster

Øyvind Alsaker (born 16 August 1965) is a sports journalist and television personality from Florø, Sogn og Fjordane. He has been a football commentator for TV2 and Canal +. He has commented on games from the English Premier League for years.

Alsaker was involved in controversy when he and co-commentator Lars Bohinen were revealed to be making derogatory and racist remarks during the pre-match warm-up between sides Rosenborg BK and Hønefoss BK in Norwegian Premier League on 17 October 2010.

He was also TV2's main commentator in Germany during the FIFA World Cup in 2006, and commentated on the majority of the games that were played. He has openly stated that he is a Liverpool F.C. supporter.

Alsaker worked for several years as a journalist, newsreader and presenter at NRK's regional office in Hordaland, before joining TV2 at the start of 1992. In his first year with the channel Alsaker fulfilled many roles including sports anchor and skiing commentator next to his main job as a football commentator. He was employed by Canal + in 1998, but returned to TV2 in 2006. He has continued to commentate on English football on Canal + after his return to TV2.

Alsaker also commented on Euro 2008 in Switzerland and Austria together with Nils Johan Semb and Tore André Dahlum.
