= Robert O. Young =

American naturopathic practitioner (born 1952)

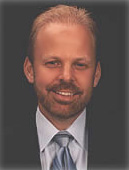
- Born: Robert Oldham Young; March 6, 1952 (age 74)
- Occupations: Naturopath, author, entrepreneur
- Known for: PH Miracle book series
- Spouse: Shelley Redford

Robert Oldham Young (born March 6, 1952) is an American naturopathic practitioner and author of alternative medicine books promoting an alkaline diet. His most popular works are the "pH Miracle" series of books, which outline his beliefs about holistic healing and an "alkalarian" lifestyle. Young came to prominence after appearances on The Oprah Winfrey Show featured his treatment of Kim Tinkham for breast cancer. Tinkham and Young both claimed that he had cured her, but she died of her disease shortly afterward. He was arrested in January 2014 and convicted in 2016 on two out of three charges of theft and practicing medicine without a license. He spent several months in jail in 2017.

In November 2018 a San Diego jury awarded US$105 million in damages to a cancer patient he persuaded to forgo effective treatment in favor of his alkaline diet, resulting in her disease progressing to an incurable stage 4.

Young was convicted again in 2025 for practicing medicine without a license and sentenced to 68 months in prison.

== Background ==
Young's website states he attended the University of Utah on a tennis scholarship and studied biology and business in the early 1970s. He did not graduate. He then performed missionary work for the Church of Jesus Christ of Latter-day Saints for two years in London. Young, who is not a medical doctor, has received doctorates for naturopathy and nutrition from Clayton College of Natural Health (formerly American College of Holistic Nutrition), a defunct correspondence school that was not accredited by any agency recognized by the U.S. Department of Education. The prosecution at his 2016 trial said his doctorate was purchased from a "diploma mill", and it was pointed out that he had gone from a bachelor's to a doctor's degree in eight months.

Young has residences in Alpine, Utah and Rancho Del Sol, an avocado and grapefruit ranch in Valley Center, California, with his wife, Shelley Redford Young.

== Published books ==
Young has authored a series of books and videos titled The pH Miracle (2002), The pH Miracle for Diabetes (2004), The pH Miracle for Weight Loss (2005), and "The pH Miracle Revised" (2010). Other books he has authored include Herbal Nutritional Medications (1988), One Sickness, One Disease, One Treatment (1992), Sick and Tired (1995), Back to the House of Health (1999), and Back to the House of Health 2 (2003).

== Work ==
Young promotes an alkaline diet based on notions that are not compatible with the scientific understandings of nutrition and disease. He claims that health depends primarily on proper balance between an alkaline and acid environment in the human body, and that an acid environment causes cancer, obesity, osteoporosis, yeast overgrowth, influenza, skin disorders, and other diseases. Young writes about pleomorphism, a school of thought that was prominent in late-19th-century microbiology that asserts that red blood cells transform into bacteria when the surrounding environment becomes acidic—an idea that was proven wrong with the development of germ theory. Young's fundamental claim is that the human body is alkaline by design and acidic by function, and that there is only one disease ("acidosis") and one treatment (an alkaline diet).

Young's books recommend a low-stress lifestyle and a high-water-content, high-chlorophyll, plant-based diet. He recommends moderate intake of high-carbohydrate vegetables, some grains, and fresh fish. Young recommends abstaining from "acidic" foods—sugar, red meat, shellfish, eggs, dairy, processed and refined foods, stored grains, artificial sweeteners, alcohol, coffee, chocolate, and sodas—because he believes that such foods overload the body with acidity and cause disease. Young claims that disorders such as weight gain, water retention, high cholesterol, kidney stones, and tumors are all life-saving mechanisms for dealing with excess acidity in the body.

Research supporting alkaline diets, like that promoted by Young, is limited to in vitro and animal studies. A number of recent systematic reviews and meta-analyses in the medical literature have concluded that there is no evidence that alkaline diets are beneficial to humans.

According to a book review by the Academy of Nutrition and Dietetics, some aspects of his diet, such as the emphasis on eating green leafy vegetables and exercise, would likely be healthy; however, the diet overall "is not a healthy way to lose weight." Quackwatch describes Young's claims as "fanciful".

=== Nutritional microscopy ===
Young bases some of his theories, research, and written works on the alternative medical approach of live blood analysis. Young teaches microscopy courses in which he trains people to perform live blood analysis as well as dry blood analysis. Young has stated that he teaches live blood analysis solely for research and educational purposes, and not for use in diagnosing medical conditions, which the San Diego Union-Tribune characterizes as "a legal distinction that some might find elusive in practice".

Live blood analysis is used by some alternative medical practitioners, who claim it to be a valuable qualitative assessment of a person's state of health. Live blood analysis lacks scientific foundation, and has been described as a fraudulent means of convincing patients to buy dietary supplements and as a medically useless "money-making scheme". Live blood analysis has been described by the U.S. Department of Health and Human Services as an "unestablished laboratory test", or test that is not generally accepted in laboratory medicine.

== Practicing medicine without a license ==
In 1995, Young allegedly drew blood from two women, told them they were ill, and then sold them herbal products to treat these illnesses. He was charged with two third-degree felony counts of practicing medicine without a license, but pled guilty to a reduced misdemeanor charge. Young argued that he had never claimed to be a medical doctor, that the women had entrapped him by asking to be part of his research, and that he "looked at the women's blood and simply gave them some nutritional advice."

In 2001, Young was again charged with a felony in Utah, after a cancer patient alleged that Young told her to stop chemotherapy and to substitute one of his products to treat her cancer. Subsequently, when an undercover agent visited Young, he allegedly analyzed her blood and prescribed a liquid diet. The case was taken to preliminary trial, but charges were dropped after the prosecutor stated that he could not find enough people who felt cheated by Young. Young dismissed the arrests as "harassment" and stated that he moved to California because the legal climate there was more tolerant. On 12 May 2011 Quackwatch published a critical analysis of Young's qualifications and practices.

In 2014 Young was arrested in San Diego and received 18 felony charges relating to practicing medicine without a license, and of theft. According to the Medical Board of California's press release, chronically ill patients were paying Young up to $50,000 for his treatments. His trial started in Vista Superior Court in November 2015. In February 2016, jurors found Young guilty of two counts of practicing medicine without a license. As of January 2017 he was facing a three-year jail sentence and was also to be retried on six charges of fraud, after a jury deadlocked 8–4. To avoid a retrial, Young pleaded guilty to two more counts of practicing medicine without a license. The 44-month sentence in the plea agreement included a declaration by Young that he has no degrees from any accredited schools, and that he is not "a microbiologist, hematologist, medical doctor, naturopathic doctor, or trained scientist".

Young was sentenced at the end of June 2017.

In November 2018 he was ordered to pay US$105 million to a cancer patient who had sued him for claiming to be a doctor and advising her to forgo traditional medical treatment. The judge later reduced the cost to just over $25 million.

In February 2025 he was convicted by a jury in North County, San Diego, on a range of charges including elder abuse, theft from an elder and practising medicine without a license. On 28 May 2025 he was sentenced to almost 6 years in prison.

In Season 2, Episode 1 of the TV series "The Curious Case of..." on Investigation Discovery the program featured Young and his questionable practices (aired 12 January 2026).

== Kim Tinkham ==
In 2007, Kim Tinkham, diagnosed with stage three breast cancer, adopted Young's protocols and promoted them on her own website and on The Oprah Winfrey Show. She claimed to be "cancer free by all medical terms" in 2008, but died of cancer in 2010.

== Claims about vaccines ==
In 2020, at a meeting of the conspiracy theory group International Tribunal for Natural Justice, Young made a speech that included comments about Bill Gates and vaccines ("For the purpose of sterilization and population control, there’s too many people on the planet we need to get rid of. In the words of Bill Gates, at least three billion people need to die”; international health agencies are "using chemical warfare against all of us") that went viral on social media, which were dismissed as false by numerous fact-checking organizations.

== See also ==
- List of unproven and disproven cancer treatments
