= Alkaline diet =

Fad diet

- Alkaline ash diet, alkaline acid diet, acid ash diet, acid alkaline diet
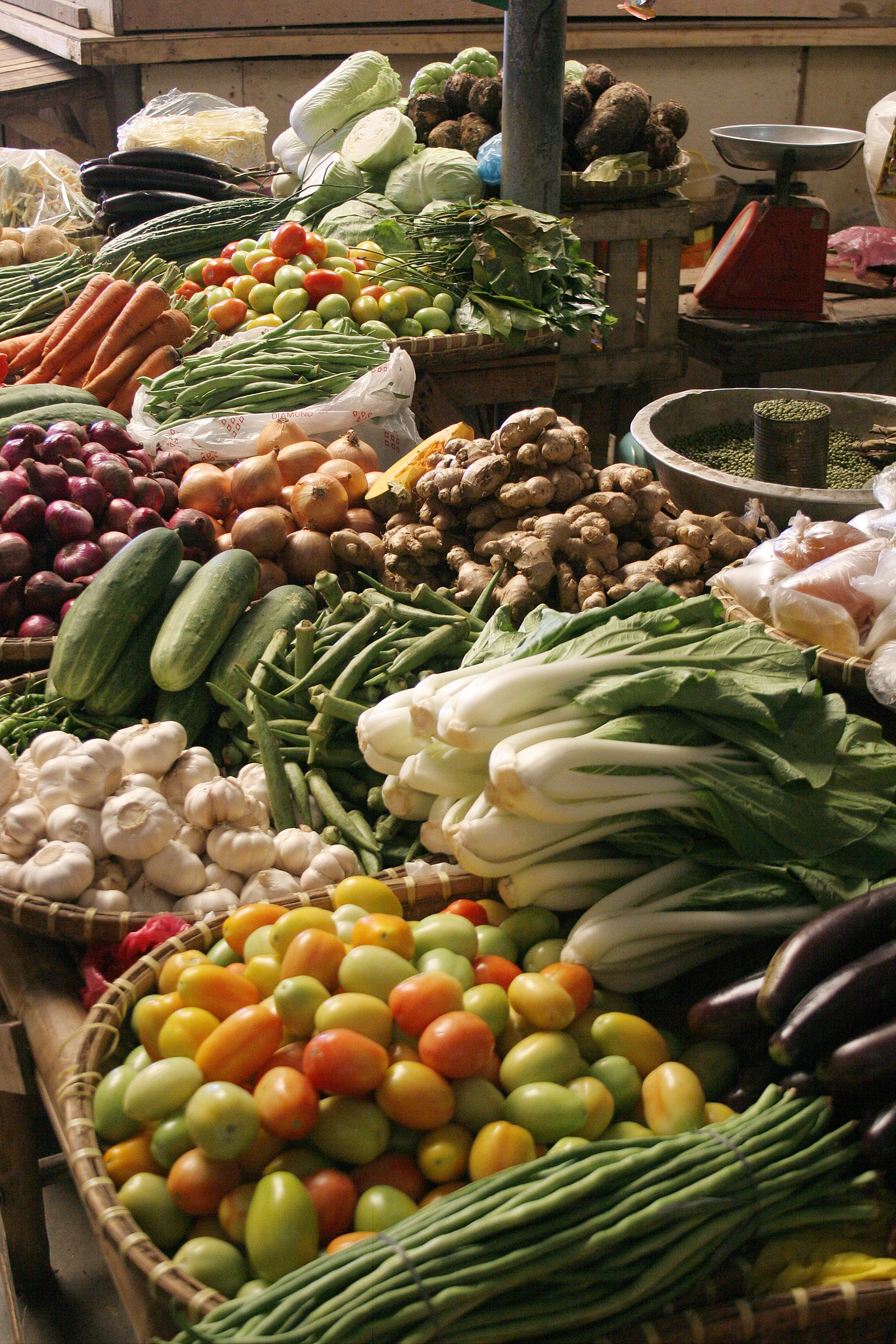
- An alkaline diet encourages the consumption of most fruits and vegetables and omits foods such as most grains and meat, cheese, and eggs

Alternative therapy

Alkaline diet (also known as the alkaline ash diet, alkaline acid diet, acid ash diet, and acid alkaline diet) describes a group of loosely related diets based on the misconception that different types of food can affect the pH balance of the body. It originated from the acid ash hypothesis, which primarily related to osteoporosis research. Proponents of the diet believe that certain foods can affect the acidity (pH) of the body and that the change in pH can therefore be used to treat or prevent disease. However, their claims are false, and there is no evidence supporting the claimed mechanisms of this diet, which is not recommended by dietitians or other health professionals.

The "acid-ash" hypothesis claimed that excess dietary production of acid was a risk factor for osteoporosis, but the scientific evidence does not support this hypothesis.

== Alternative medicine ==
Alternative medicine practitioners who have promoted the alkaline diet have advocated its use in the treatment of various medical conditions, including cancer. These claims have been mainly promoted on websites, magazines, direct mail, and books, and have been mainly directed at a lay audience. This version of the diet, in addition to avoiding meats and other proteins, also advocates avoiding processed foods, white sugar, white flour, and caffeine, and can involve specific exercise and nutritional supplement regimens as well.

Alkaline diets have been promoted as supposed anti-cancer diets based on the misconception that acidity is the cause, rather than the result, of tumour activity. Advocates sometimes advise testing urine pH to see whether the diet is working – a futile activity as urine pH does not mirror bodily pH generally.

A version of this diet has also been promoted by Robert O. Young as a method of weight loss in his book The pH Miracle. According to the Academy of Nutrition and Dietetics, portions of his diet, such as the emphasis on eating green leafy vegetables and exercise, would likely be healthy. However, the "obscure theory" on which his diet is based and the reliance on complicated fasting regimens and nutritional supplements mean that this diet "is not a healthy way to lose weight." It has also been proposed that acid causes rheumatoid arthritis and osteoarthritis, and that an alkaline diet can be used to treat these conditions. There is no evidence to support this proposal.

Urinary and/or saliva testing for acidity has been proposed to measure the body's acidity level and therefore the risk for diseases. However, there is no correlation between the urinary pH and the body's acidity.

== Adverse effects ==
Because the alkaline diet promotes excluding certain families of foods, it could result in a less balanced diet with resulting nutrient deficiencies such as essential fatty acids and phytonutrients. Many websites and books promoting this diet sell courses of supplements and foods which are unnecessary to purchase even under the diet's own terms. The effort needed to use this diet is considered "high" as many foods need to be excluded.

== Proposed mechanism ==
According to the traditional acid ash hypothesis underlying this diet, acid ash is produced by meat, poultry, cheese, fish, eggs, and grains. Alkaline ash is produced by fruits and vegetables, except cranberries, prunes, and plums. Since the acid or alkaline ash designation is based on the residue left on combustion rather than the acidity of the food, foods, such as citrus fruits, that are generally considered acidic are actually considered alkaline-producing in this diet.

Advocates propose that since the normal pH of the blood is slightly alkaline, the goal of diet should be to mirror this by eating a diet that is alkaline-producing as well. These advocates propose that diets high in acid-producing elements will generally lead the body to become acidic and thereby foster disease. While a selectively alkaline diet may change the pH level in the urine, it has not been shown to elicit a sustained change in blood pH levels, nor to provide the clinical benefits claimed by its proponents, because it is "virtually impossible" to create a less acidic environment in the body. Because of the body's natural regulatory mechanisms, which do not require a special diet to work, eating an alkaline diet can, at most, change the blood pH minimally and transiently.

A similar proposal by those advocating this diet suggests that cancer grows in an acidic environment, and that an alkaline diet can change the environment of the body to treat cancer. However, contrary to the premise of the proposal, it is the rapid growth of cancer cells that creates an acidic environment associated with cancer; the acidic environment does not create cancer. "Extreme" dietary plans such as this diet have more risks than benefits for patients with cancer.

== Evaluation ==
The British Dietetic Association named the alkaline diet one of the "top 5 worst celeb diets to avoid in 2018", branding it as "nonsense".

This proposed mechanism, in which the diet can significantly change the acidity of the blood, goes against "everything we know about the chemistry of the human body" and has been called a "myth" in a statement by the American Institute for Cancer Research.

While it has been proposed that this diet can help increase energy, lose weight, and treat cancer and heart disease, there is no evidence to support any of these claims. The diet is not recommended by dietitians or other health professionals.

These diets have been promoted by alternative medicine practitioners, who propose that such diets treat or prevent cancer, heart disease, low energy levels, and other illnesses. Human blood is maintained between pH 7.35 and 7.45 by acid–base homeostasis mechanisms. Levels above 7.45 are referred to as alkalosis and levels below 7.35 as acidosis. Both are potentially serious. The idea that these diets can materially affect blood pH to treat a range of diseases is not supported by scientific research. It makes incorrect assumptions about how alkaline diets function contrary to human physiology.

While diets avoiding meat, poultry, cheese, and grains can be used to make the urine more alkaline (higher pH), difficulties in effectively predicting the effects of these diets have led to medications, rather than diet modification, as the preferred method of changing urine pH. The "acid-ash" hypothesis was once considered a risk factor for osteoporosis, though the current weight of scientific evidence does not support this hypothesis.

== History ==
The role of the diet and its influence on the acidity of urine has been studied for decades, as physiologists have studied the kidney's role in the body's regulatory mechanisms for controlling the acidity of body fluids. The French biologist Claude Bernard provided the classical observation of this effect when he found that changing the diet of rabbits from an herbivore (mainly plant) diet to a carnivore (mainly meat) diet changed the urine from more alkaline to more acid. Spurred by these observations, subsequent investigations focused on the chemical properties and acidity of constituents of the remains of foods combusted in a bomb calorimeter, described as ash. The "dietary ash hypothesis" proposed that these foods, when metabolized, would leave a similar "acid ash" or "alkaline ash" in the body as those oxidized in combustion.

Nutrition scientists began to refine this hypothesis in the early 20th century, emphasizing the role of negatively charged particles (anions) and positively charged particles (cations) in food. Diets high in chloride, phosphate and sulfate (all of which are anions) were presumed to be acid forming, while diets high in potassium, calcium and magnesium (all of which are cations) were presumed to be alkaline forming. Other investigations showed specific foods, such as cranberries, prunes, and plums had unusual effects on urine pH. While these foods provided an alkaline ash in the laboratory, they contain a weak organic acid, hippuric acid, which caused the urine to become more acidic instead.

=== Historical uses of alkaline diets ===
Historically, the medical application of alkaline diets largely focused on preventing recurrence of kidney stones as well as the prevention of recurrent urinary tract infections, by relying on the recognized ability of such diets to affect urinary pH. Years ago, such a diet was used to adjust the acidity of the urinary environment that the stones formed, and could hypothetically help prevent stones from forming or the development of UTIs. However, the analytical methods that attempted to calculate the effects of food on urinary pH were not precise except in very general terms, making effective use of such diets difficult. Therefore, medications, which can more reliably alter the urine pH, rather than diet modification, have been the treatment of choice when trying to alter urine pH. While there have been recent improvements in recognizing different variables that can affect acid excretion in the urine, the level of detail needed to predict the urinary pH based on diet is still daunting. Precise calculations require very detailed knowledge of the nutritional components of every meal as well as the rate of absorption of nutrients, which can vary substantially from individual to individual, making effective estimation of urine pH not currently feasible.

== See also ==
- List of ineffective cancer treatments
- D. C. Jarvis – Advocated higher blood acidity as prevention and treatment
- Hay diet
- List of diets
