= List of food faddists =

Food faddists (also known as pseudoscientific diet advocates) are people who promote fad diets or pseudoscientific dieting ideas. The following people are recognized as notable food faddists, either currently or historically.

== A ==
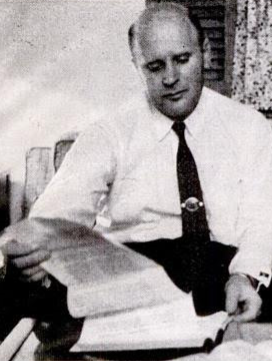
Dan Dale Alexander

- Elliot Abravanel
- Jessica Ainscough
- Dan Dale Alexander
- Rasmus Larssen Alsaker
- Daniel Amen
- Dave Asprey
- Robert Atkins

== B ==
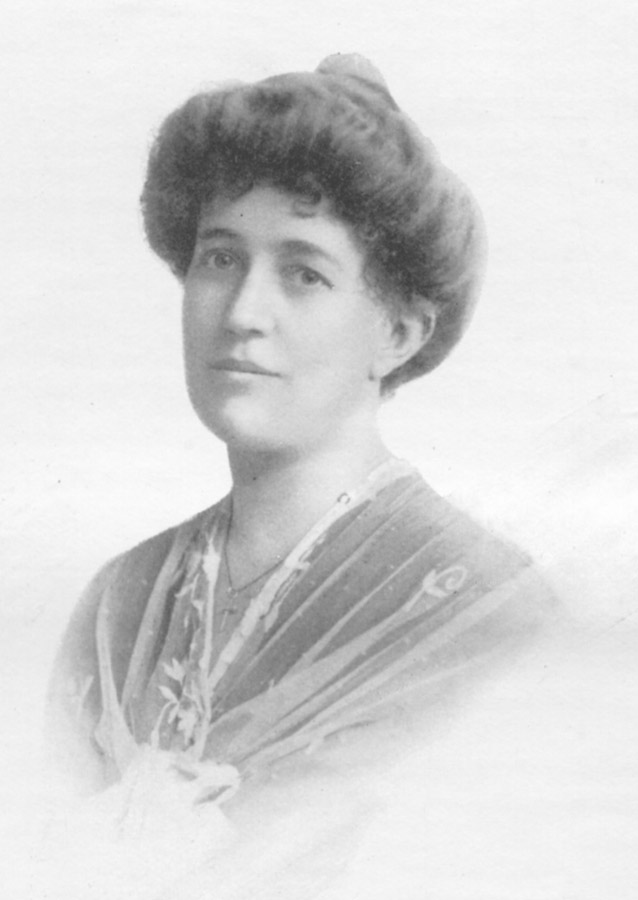
Johanna Brandt

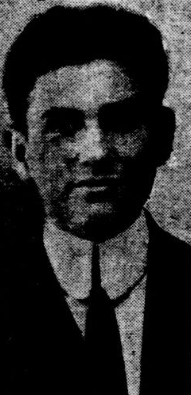
Paul Bragg

- William J. A. Bailey
- Fereydoon Batmanghelidj
- Luigi di Bella
- Sanford Bennett
- Henry G. Bieler
- Maximilian Bircher-Benner
- Russell Blaylock
- Alfredo Bowman
- William Brady
- Paul Bragg
- Johanna Brandt
- Eric R. Braverman
- John R. Brinkley
- Johanna Budwig
- Stanley Burroughs

== C ==
- Kristina Carrillo-Bucaram
- Hereward Carrington
- Deepak Chopra
- Eugene Christian
- Hulda Regehr Clark
- Gabriel Cousens

== D ==
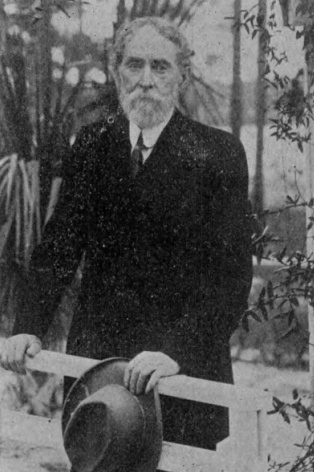
Emmet Densmore

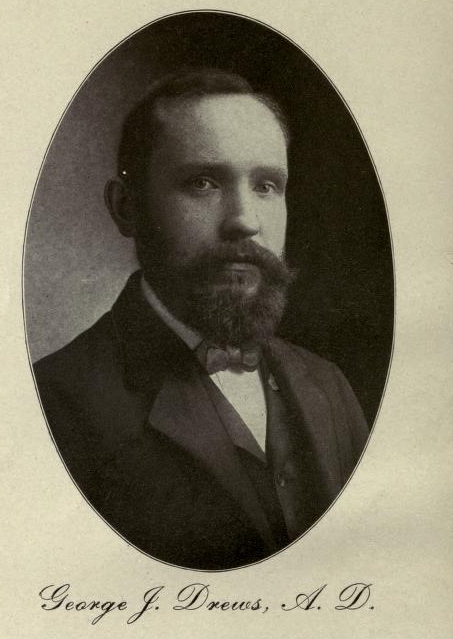
George J. Drews

- Peter J. D'Adamo
- Adelle Davis
- Lorraine Day
- Emmet Densmore
- Arnold DeVries
- Edward H. Dewey
- Marilyn Diamond
- Kurt Donsbach
- George J. Drews

== E ==
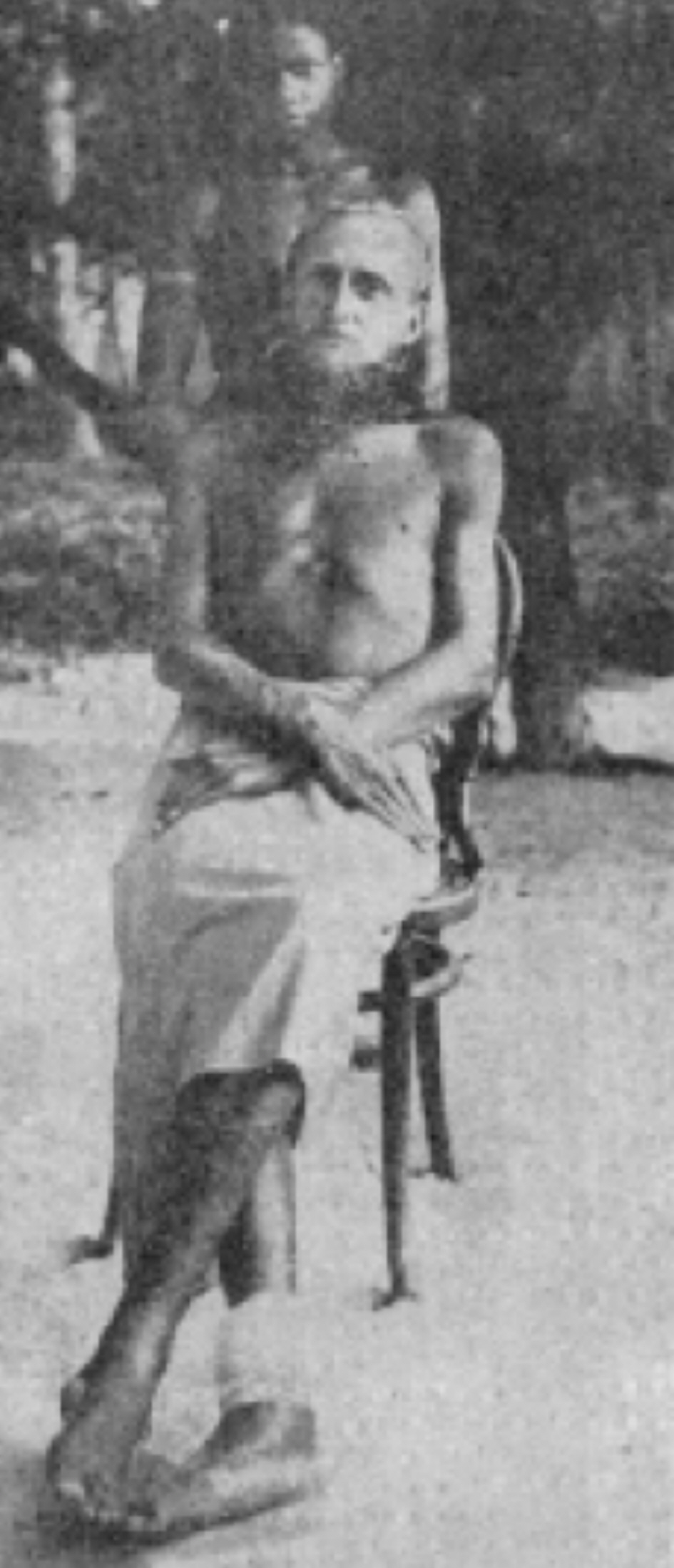
August Engelhardt

- Webster Edgerly
- Arnold Ehret
- August Engelhardt
- St. Louis Estes

== F ==
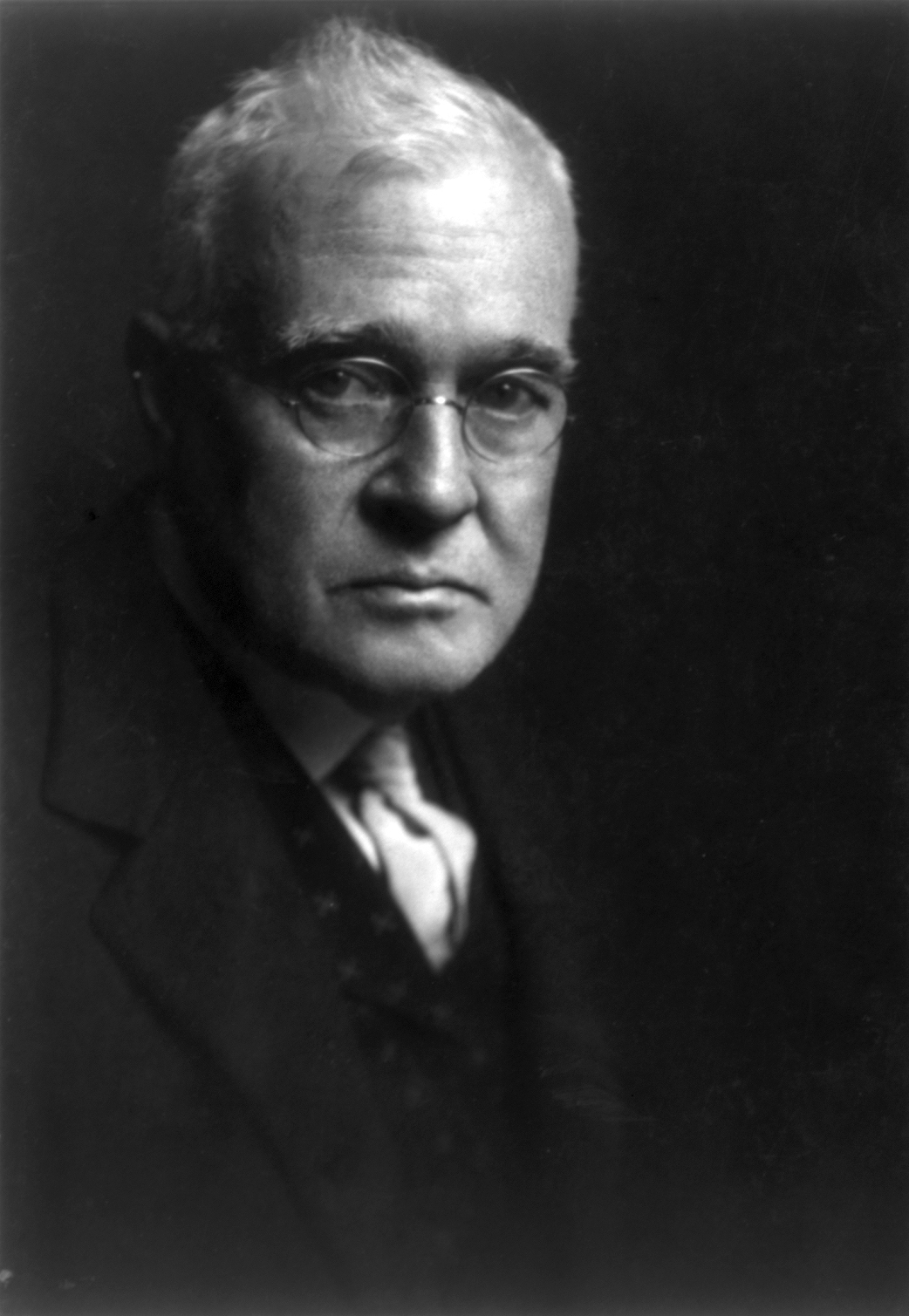
Horace Fletcher

- Horace Fletcher
- Carlton Fredericks

== G ==
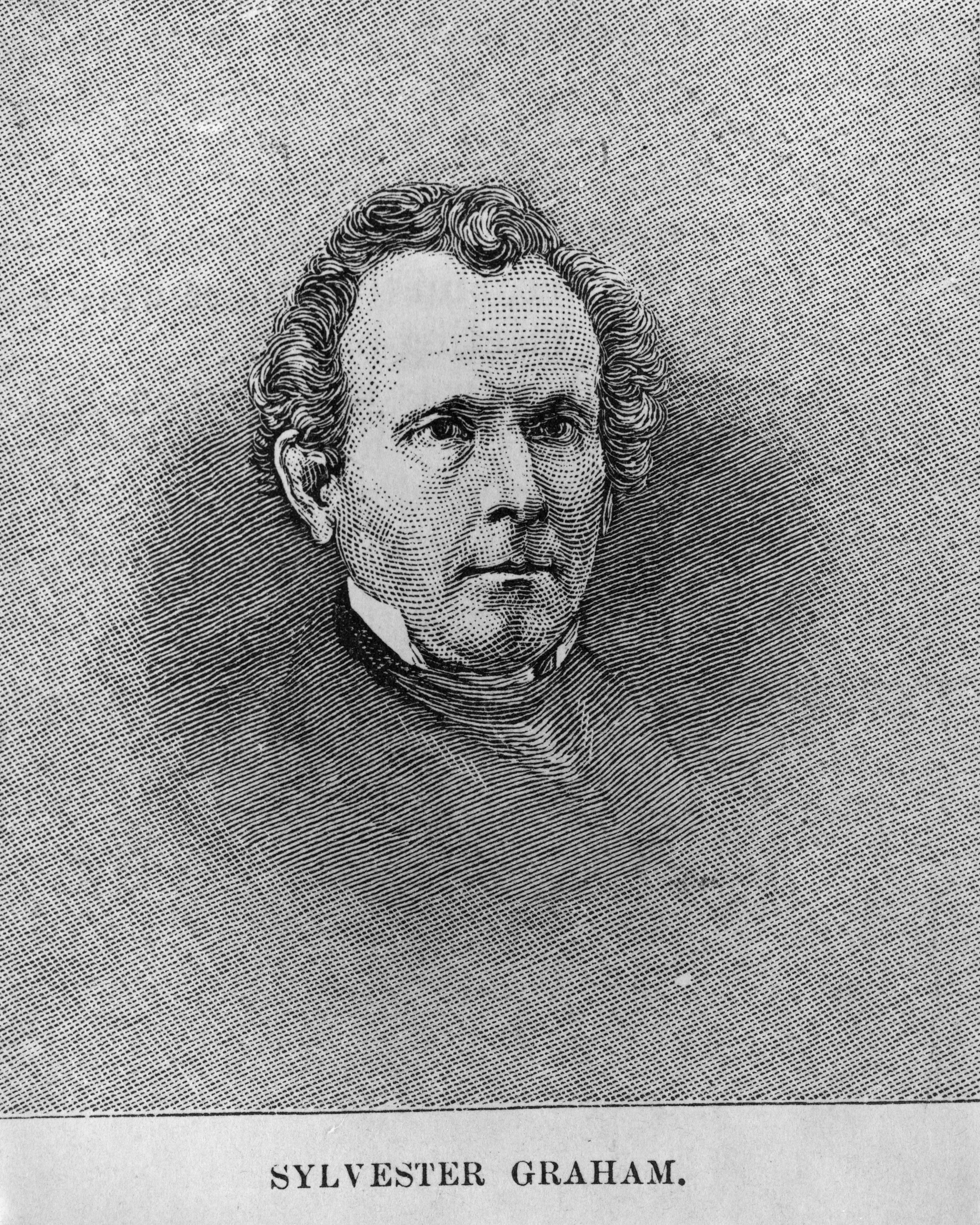
Sylvester Graham

- Jesse Mercer Gehman
- Max Gerson
- Belle Gibson
- Ann Louise Gittleman
- Justine C. Glass
- Sylvester Graham
- Steven Gundry

== H ==
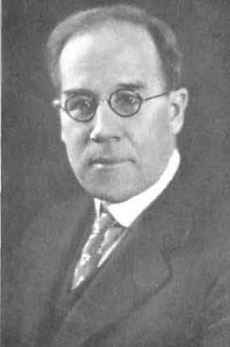
William Howard Hay

- Vani Hari
- Gayelord Hauser
- William Howard Hay
- Linda Hazzard
- Bob Hoffman
- Adolphus Hohensee
- Patrick Holford

== J ==
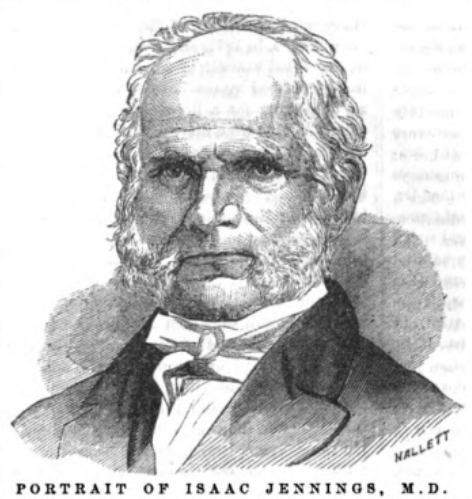
Isaac Jennings

- D. C. Jarvis
- Jasmuheen
- Isaac Jennings
- Adolf Just

== K ==
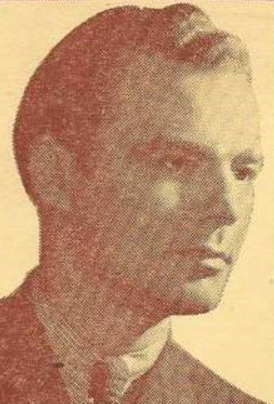
Lelord Kordel

- William Donald Kelley
- Willis Sharpe Kilmer
- Lelord Kordel
- Catherine Kousmine
- Morris Krok

== L ==
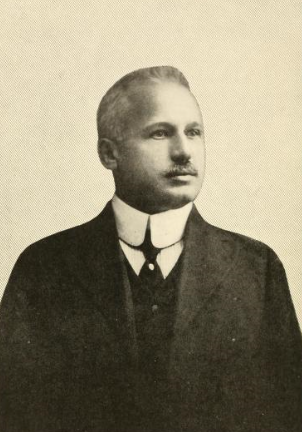
Benedict Lust

- Henry Lindlahr
- Benedict Lust

== M ==
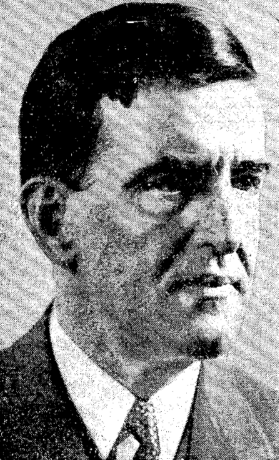
Alfred W. McCann

- Aseem Malhotra
- Judy Mazel
- Alfred W. McCann
- Frank McCoy
- John A. McDougall
- Gillian McKeith
- Joseph Mercola
- Eustace Miles
- Earl Mindell
- Theodor Morell
- James Morison
- Michael Mosley
- Elijah Muhammad

== N ==
- Gary Null

== O ==
- Mehmet Oz

== P ==
- Gwyneth Paltrow
- James Martin Peebles
- David Perlmutter
- Nicholas Perricone
- Lydia Pinkham
- Edward Earle Purinton

== R ==
- Andrea Rabagliati
- Matthias Rath
- Lair Ribeiro
- John and Vera Richter
- Seth Roberts
- J. I. Rodale

== S ==
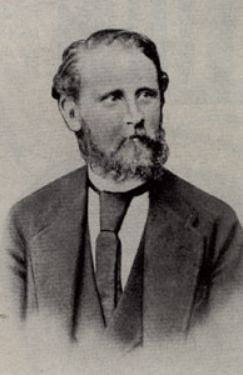
Gustav Schlickeysen

- Maureen Kennedy Salaman
- Anthony Sattilaro
- Gustav Schlickeysen
- Herbert M. Shelton
- Walter Siegmeister
- Lendon Smith
- Suzanne Somers
- Alois P. Swoboda
- Edmund Bordeaux Szekely

== T ==
- Herman Taller
- John Henry Tilden
- Kevin Trudeau

== V ==
- Walter L. Voegtlin
- Aajonus Vonderplanitz

== W ==
- Robert Walter
- Joshua Ward
- Oprah Winfrey
- George S. Weger
- Ann Wigmore
- David Wolfe

== Y ==
- Robert O. Young
