= Harry W. J. Edbrooke =

American architect

Harry Willoughby J. Edbrooke (1873-1946)

Harry W. J. Edbrooke (1873–1946) was an American architect. He was born in Chicago into a family of architects. His father was Willoughby J. Edbrooke (1843 — 1896). He worked with his uncle Frank E. Edbrooke in Denver, Colorado. Several of his works are listed on the U.S. National Register of Historic Places.

He graduated from Armour Institute of Technology in 1898. After serving as a draftsman under architects William K. Fellows and Howard Van Doren Shaw, he started his own practice in 1904. In 1908, he went to Denver to join Frank, with whom he worked until 1913, when Frank retired.

Works of his that are listed on the National Register include:

- Hinman Apartments, Evanston, IL (Atchison & Edbrooke), NRHP-listed
- Le Mars Central High School, Le Mars, IA (Atchison & Edbrooke), NRHP-listed
- Ridgewood, Evanston, IL (Atchison & Edbrooke), NRHP-listed
- Bluebird Theater, 3315-3317 E. Colfax Ave., Denver, CO (Edbrooke, Harry W. J.), NRHP-listed
- First National Bank Building, 818 17th St., Denver, CO (Edbrooke, Harry, W. J.), NRHP-listed
- Denver Gas & Electric Building, later Public Service Building, 910 15th St., Denver, CO, NRHP-listed
- Tilden School for Teaching Health, Jct. of W. Fairview Pl. and Grove St., Denver, CO (Edbrooke, Harry W. J.), NRHP-listed

Other works include:

- Ogden Theatre, 935 E. Colfax Avenue, Denver, CO
- W.H. Kistler Stationery Store, 1636 Champa, Denver, CO
- A.T. Lewis Dry Goods Company building, later known at the Denver and Rio Grande Building, 1531 Stout, Denver, CO
- Valverde School
- Fifth Church of Christ, Scientist

and other buildings.
