= Chase Dietary Method =

Alternative cancer treatment

The Chase Dietary Method is an alternative cancer treatment proposed by osteopathic physician Alice Chase (1898–1974). Medical experts have described the Chase Dietary Method as ineffective and potentially hazardous to health.

The Chase method is based on the discredited idea that retained waste in the body causes tumours. Chase stated that raw fruit and vegetables soak up unexcreted waste like a sponge so should be consumed daily. The Chase method consists of fasting, consuming vegetable juice, bed rest and enemas. Chase was influenced by John Henry Tilden and aimed to eliminate human diseases through dietary methods.

Chase encouraged the consumption of vegetable juice from celery, parsley and cabbage leaves as she believed they soak out unexcreted wastes. Sulfur containing foods such as eggs, fish and meat are forbidden. Colon cleansing must be practiced daily. Coffee and fruit juices such as grapefruit and lemon are to be taken as enemas. Chase wrote that "the coffee enema by rectum is a stimulant, by mouth it is a poisonous beverage".

The American Cancer Society who reviewed the Chase Dietary Method found that there is no evidence it is effective as a cancer treatment.

Alice Chase died in 1974 from malnutrition.

== See also ==
- List of unproven and disproven cancer treatments
