= Plymouth County Historical Museum =

- Le Mars Central High School
- U.S. National Register of Historic Places
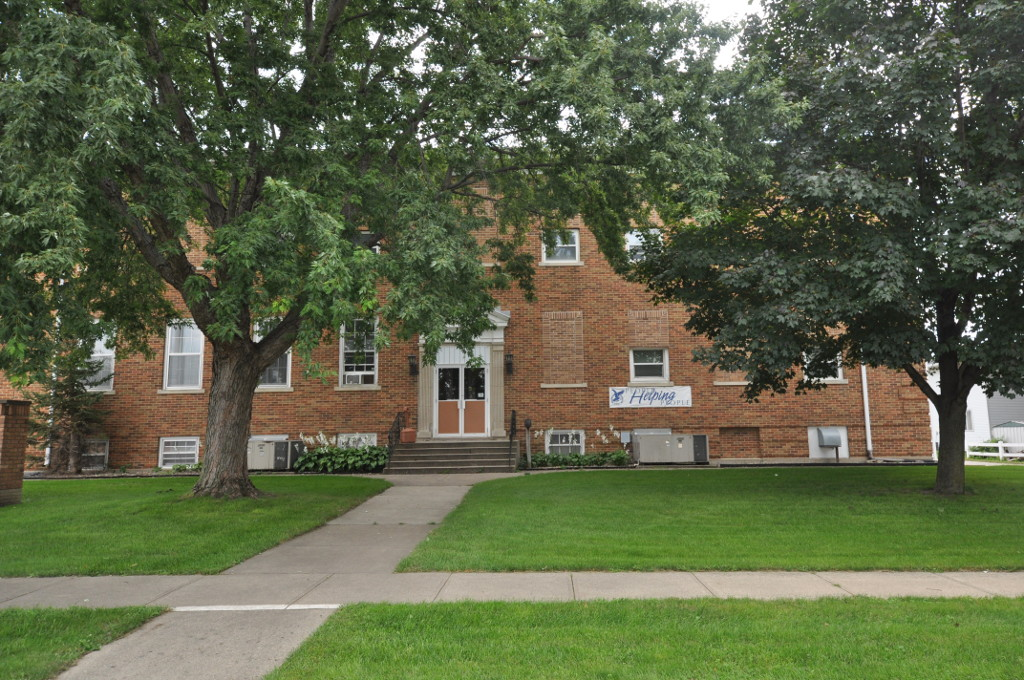

- Location within Iowa Location within the United States
- Location: 335 1st Ave., SW. Le Mars, Iowa
- Coordinates: 42°47′19.7″N 96°10′05.8″W
- Area: less than one acre
- Built: 1905, 1924
- Built by: John A. Huxtable
- Architect: Atchison and Edbrooke; Beuttler & Arnold
- Architectural style: Colonial Revival
- NRHP reference No.: 99000492
- Added to NRHP: May 14, 1999

Plymouth County Historical Museum is located in Le Mars, Iowa, United States. The building was originally Le Mars Central High School. The first school building in the city was constructed on this block in 1876. It was torn down in 1905 when the center part of this building was completed in 1905. The two-story, brick, Colonial Revival structure was designed by the Chicago architectural firm of Atchison and Edbrooke. Contractor for the project was John A. Huxtable of Le Mars. All 12 grades and the school district's administration were housed in the building. The first addition made to the school was completed in 1924. Sympathetic in style to the original building, the addition was designed by Beuttler & Arnold of Sioux City, and constructed by Devereux and Olsen of Minneapolis. It runs south and then west of the 1905 building and includes the gymnasium and auditorium. The final addition was completed in 1952 by Nemmers Brothers of Le Mars. Built onto the north side of the original building, it is typical of the 1950s "Industrial" style, and was designed by Beuttler as well.

The senior high school was the first division to leave the building in 1965 when the present Le Mars High School was completed. The junior high school moved to its own building in 1972. The school district housed the elementary school in the 1952 addition until 1980 when it closed the building. The Plymouth County Historical Society occupies the 1924 addition, and utilizes the space for their local history museum. The building was listed on the National Register of Historic Places in 1999.
