= First National Bank Building (Denver, Colorado) =

- U.S. National Register of Historic Places
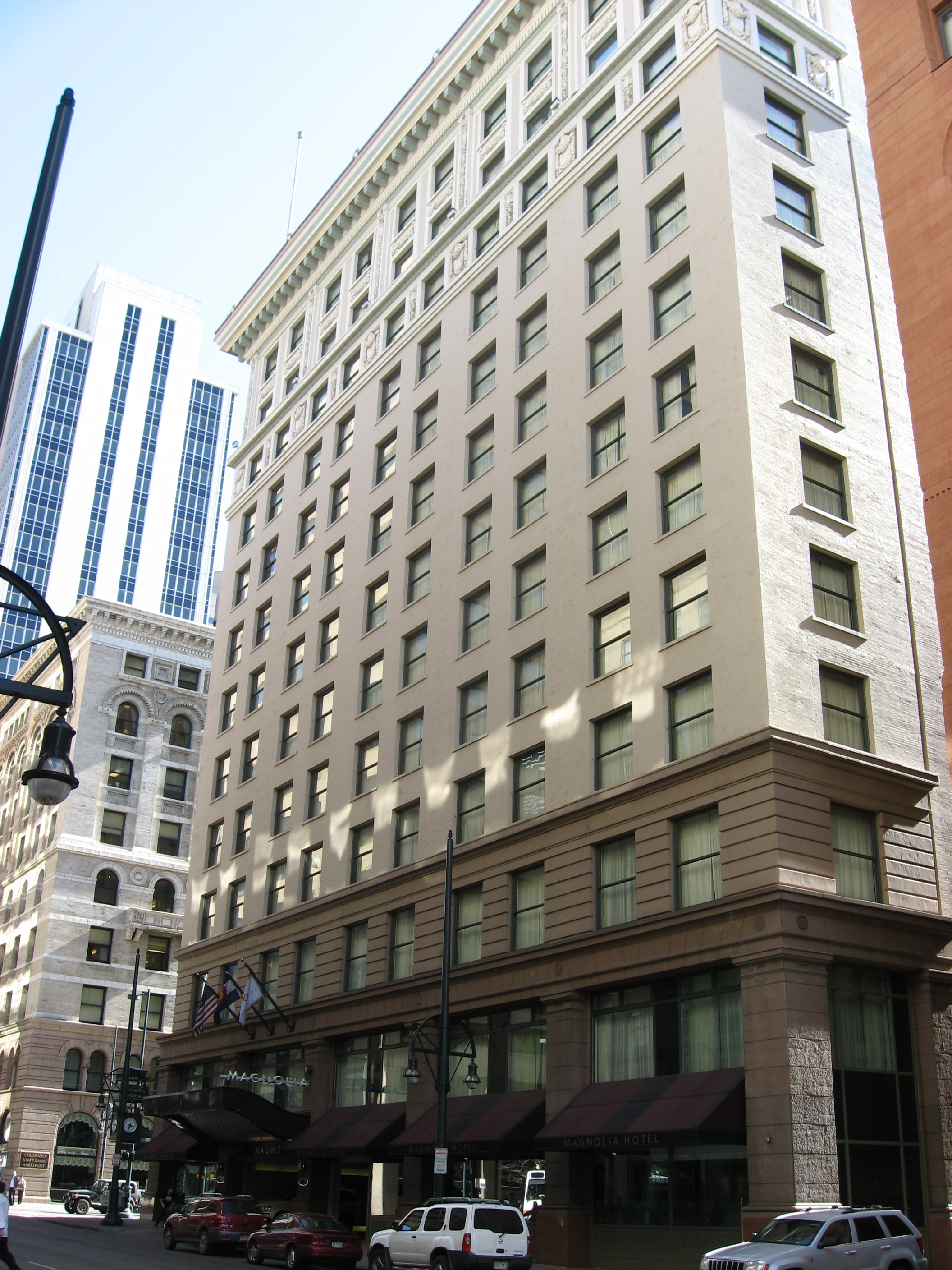

- Location within Colorado Location within the United States
- Location: 818 17th Street, Downtown Denver, Colorado
- Coordinates: 39°44′49″N 104°59′31″W
- Area: 0.7 acres (0.28 ha)
- Built: 1911
- Architect: Harry W. J. Edbrooke
- Architectural style: Chicago
- NRHP reference No.: 96000165
- Added to NRHP: February 23, 1996

The First National Bank Building, also known as the American National Bank of Denver, Colorado was originally built as the headquarters building in 1911. Located at the corner of 17th and Stout Streets, it is now the Magnolia Hotel. It was listed on the National Register of Historic Places in 1996. In 2000, it became part of the Downtown Denver Historic District.

== First National Bank ==
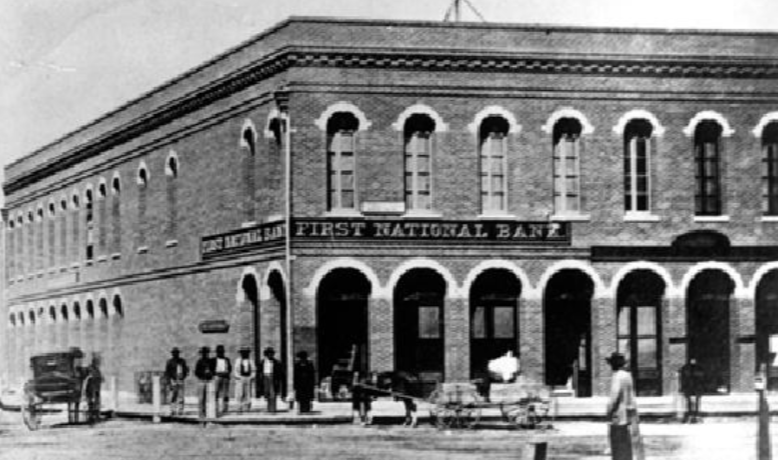
First National Bank of Denver, about 1865. It was one of the first brick buildings in Denver.

The First National Bank of Denver operated from 1865 to 1958. John Evans, the son of William Gray Evans and the grandson of Territorial Governor John Evans, was the president beginning in 1928. In 1958, Evans merged the First National Bank of Denver with the International Trust Company that was also under his leadership.

== Construction ==
The first high-rise building on 17th Street in Denver, the First National Bank building, was a 13-story building was built in 1911. It was designed by Harry W. J. Edbrooke, an architect from Chicago. The front façade was made with terra cotta and stone ornamentation.

== History ==
First National Bank occupied the building until 1958. In the 1960s, the façade was modernized with decorative concrete. American National Bank occupied the building from 1962 to 1981. The building was vacant in the 1980s due to lack of maintenance and the building being outdated.

The building became part of the Downtown Urban Renewal Area in 1993 and financing was provided for a $19.5 million renovation which would convert the building into the Holtze Executive Place extended stay hotel, owned by Steve Holtze. The renovation included removal of the concrete façade, restore the original façade, and renovate the building. The hotel opened in August 1995 with 246 hotel rooms, and retail space of 6,000 square feet.

The Magnolia Hotel, which has a traditional hotel format, occupies the building. The Magnolia brand, which began in Denver, includes a combination of downtown locations with renovated landmark buildings. The interior finishes and guest rooms were renovated as part of a $7 million renovation in July 2008.
