= Tilden School for Teaching Health =

Alternative medicine school in Denver, CO (1916–1931)

The Tilden School for Teaching Health operated from 1916 to 1931 as a private residential teaching institution and sanitarium that offered patients an alternative to the standard medical practices of the day. Located in Denver, Colorado, the school was established to teach and promote the medical theories of its founder, Dr. John Henry Tilden.

== Doctrine ==
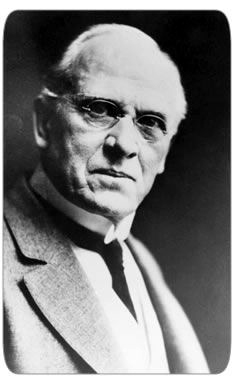
Dr. John Henry Tilden, 1851-1940

Tilden believed that toxemia, the build up of toxins and waste in the body, was “the universal cause of all diseases”. He believed that only a strict adherence to his dietary principles, a prudent lifestyle and proper hygiene would restore health and cure all illness. Tilden's techniques taught at the school included fasting, prescribed menus of carefully balanced food combinations, restrictions and rules on liquid intake, the necessity of fresh air and sunshine, colonic cleansing, rest and the elimination of stress both mental and physical. His philosophy of the body healing itself rather than outside interventions such as drugs or surgery foreshadowed modern naturopathy.

== History ==
Tilden promoted his school and views through lecture tours, books, articles and a series of journals under the titles A Stuffed Club (1900 - 1915), Philosophy of Health, and Dr. Tilden's Health Review and Critique (1926-40) The school was advertised as the place "where thousands 'Hopelessly Ill' get well without drugs, serums or surgery."

The Tilden School for Teaching Health attracted patients from all over the country and world including Canada, Great Britain and Australia. It offered furnished apartments for its patients to learn to take care of themselves and practice the Tilden techniques for healthy living. As many of his patients stayed for extended periods of time, the school's architecture and grounds were designed to invoke more of an ambiance of a residential apartment complex as opposed to a traditional medical facility.

Summer months were the busiest for the school as patients were attracted by the pleasant summer Colorado climate. At its peak, the Tilden School housed eighty five patients with a staff of thirty employees. For those who could not travel to the school, Tilden offered his consultation and prescribed diets via mail for $50 per month.

Tilden was involved in the operation of the school until 1924 when he sold most of his interest in the enterprise to Arthur Vos, Andrew Jergens (heir to the Jergens Soap Company fortune) and Frank C. Adams for $150,000. It is unclear if this is when the name was shortened to the Tilden Health School. In December 1924, after a falling out with the new owners, Tilden parted ways with the school and in 1926 opened a new operation in east Denver called the Tilden Health Institute. He operated the Institute until his death in 1940.

Vos operated the Tilden Health School until 1931, when the effects of the Great Depression forced its closure. Vos's son, Arthur Vos, Jr. was appointed receiver of the property by the Denver District Court.

Eventually the campus was divided up and sold to separate entities.

== The Tilden School for Teaching Health Historic District ==
- Tilden School for Teaching Health
- U.S. National Register of Historic Places
- U.S. Historic district
- Location within Colorado
- Location: Jct. of W. Fairview Pl. and Grove St., Denver, Colorado
- Coordinates: 39°45′51″N 105°01′41″W
- Area: 4 acres (1.6 ha)
- Built: 1915
- Architect: Harry W. J. Edbrooke, John G. Weller
- Architectural style: Classical Revival, Bungalow/craftsman, Italianate
- NRHP reference No.: 95001068
- Added to NRHP: September 7, 1995

The five buildings that made up the Tilden School for Teaching Health include the Bosler- Yankee House Administrative Building, the Patient Apartments Building, the Main Building, the Clinical Building and the Garage. The complex was listed on the National Register of Historic Places on September 7, 1995 as the Tilden School for Teaching Health Historic District. The Bosler-Yankee House Administrative Building, the Patient Apartments Building, Main Building and associated grounds were designated Denver's 56th Historic District by a unanimous vote of Denver City Council on December 16, 2019.

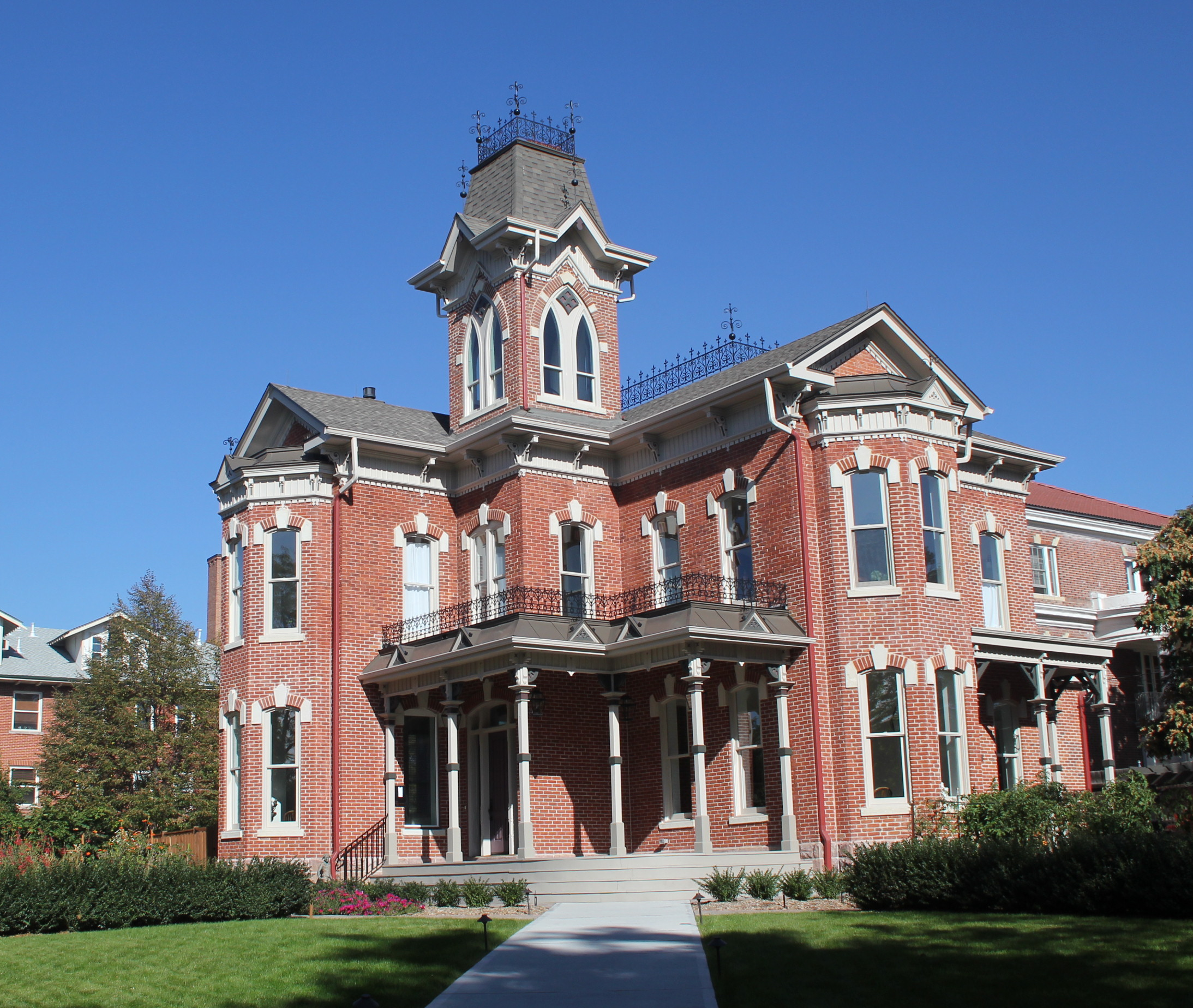
Bosler - Yankee Administration Building

=== The Bosler-Yankee House Administrative Building ===
The Bosler-Yankee House Administrative Building is located at 3209 West Fairview Place. It was designed and built by architect John G. Weller in 1882 as a single family house for Ambrose Bosler, a North Denver pioneer who made his money in the ice trade. It is a rare example of a late Victorian Italianate style residence in North Denver. It occupies what would become the Southeast corner of the Tilden School campus. It is a two-story red brick structure with a rusticated stone foundation, sills and lintels. It has a third story square tower on the southeast facade. The building has an asymmetrical form with gabled and hipped projections, tall, narrow, one over one light double hung windows featuring segmented arches. The one-story porch partially wraps around the southern and eastern elevations.

In 1890, Ambrose Bosler sold the house and the 6 lots to William Henry Yankee for $25,000. Yankee was born in 1840 in Sedalia, Missouri and moved to Denver in 1859. He enlisted as a 2nd lieutenant in the 23rd Missouri Volunteers for the Union. After being injured in the war, he resigned his commission and was discharged at the rank of Colonel. Eventually Yankee returned to Colorado and made his fortune in mining.

In 1901, the Aetna Real Estate and Investment assumed ownership of the property. In October 1914, Tilden purchased the home and the 6 lots from Aetna. The home became the Administration Building for the Tilden School for Teaching Health.

After the Tilden School closed in December 1931, the Bosler - Yankee House reverted to residential use. The house and the main building were purchased by Maude Offield in 1944. In 1946, the house was separated from the campus when it was purchased by Lorna Smith. Just 6 months later, the house was sold to Kenneth P. Morris and his mother Gladys Morris. City Directories suggest that in the years following Mr. Morris's death in November 1968, subsequent owners appeared to have rented the house out during much of the time up to the 1980s.

The Bosler - Yankee House was designated an individual Denver Landmark (number 153) in 1984.

In 1987, the house was purchased by Mr. Keith Painter. Due to an extended conflict with city hall over roof alterations and property rights, the Bosler - Yankee house fell into neglect. In May 2013, the City of Denver listed the building on the official Neglected & Derelict Building List. A $999 a day fine was levied for each day of inaction. The Bosler - Yankee House was foreclosed on by the City of Denver in May 2015 and subsequently purchased by Steve and Jan Davis in March 2016. With grants from the National Trust for Historic Preservation and the Colorado Historic Fund to fund structure assessment and rehab design, the house underwent an extensive rehabilitation from 2016-2018.

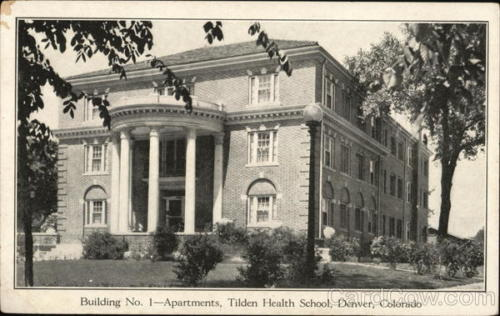
Patient Apartments Building No 1, c.1924-25

=== The Patient Apartments Building ===
The Patient Apartments Building was the first of the five buildings to be designed and constructed specifically for the Tilden School. It was built in 1916 and is located north of the Bosler-Yankee House Administration Building at 3279 Grove Street. It was designed by prominent Denver architect Harry W. J. Edbrooke. The Patient Apartments Building featured fully furnished apartments where patients could reside while learning Tilden's techniques to restore health. The building was designed in the Classical Revival Style and incorporated elements more commonly found in residential construction than medical facilities. The three-story brick building has a hipped roof and a central circular two story portico. The building in approximately 100 feet in length and the front 40 foot portion is approximately 50 feet wide with the remainder of the building approximately 48 feet in width.

After the Tilden school closed in 1931, the Patient Apartments Building became Highland Park Apartments.

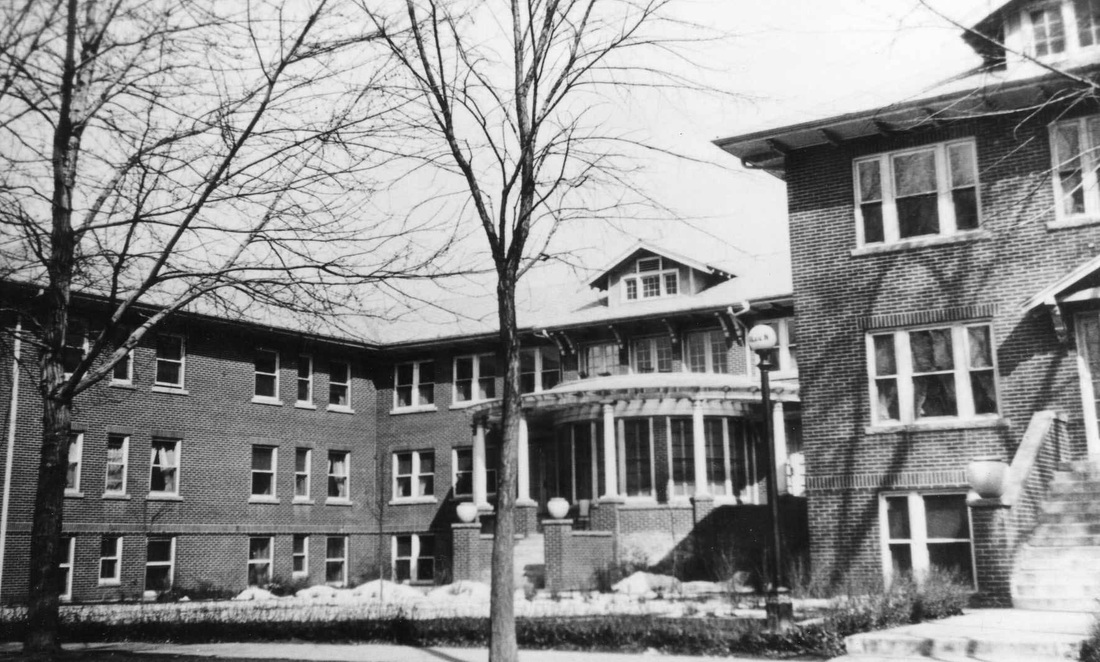
Tilden School Main Building (Building No. 2)

=== The Main Building ===
Harry Willoughby J. Edbrooke (1873-1946)

The Main Building at 3249 West Fairview Place is the largest structure erected on the Tilden School for Teaching Health campus. The red brick craftsman style influenced structure was constructed in two stages. The eastern U-shaped part of the building was built in 1919 with the western L-shaped addition built in 1921 giving the building its E-shaped form. Both sections were designed by Architect Harry W. J. Edbrooke.

The "spine" of the E is approximately 266-foot-long and 27 feet wide. The wings project 53 feet out from the spine and are 38 feet wide. The wings are separated by 76 feet. The original building footprint is approximately 13, 225 square feet and contained as many as 100 separate patient rooms, a lecture hall, dining hall, sun rooms, and other support spaces.

For a short time in the 1930s, the Main building was used to house 250 indigent elderly men by the Denver Emergency Relief Committee. From 1934 to 1939, it housed the Highland Park Hospital. From 1940 to the early 1970s it was the home of the Offield Convalescence Home. In the 1970s & 1980's the building was occupied by Carefree Guest Home and Highland Living. In 1995, plans began to convert the main building into 36 condo units under the name of Fairview Place Residences/Fairview lofts and demolition of interior non bearing walls began. Attic space was converted to living space with the addition of dormers, entrances were changed and two exterior stair landings and an elevator tower were added.

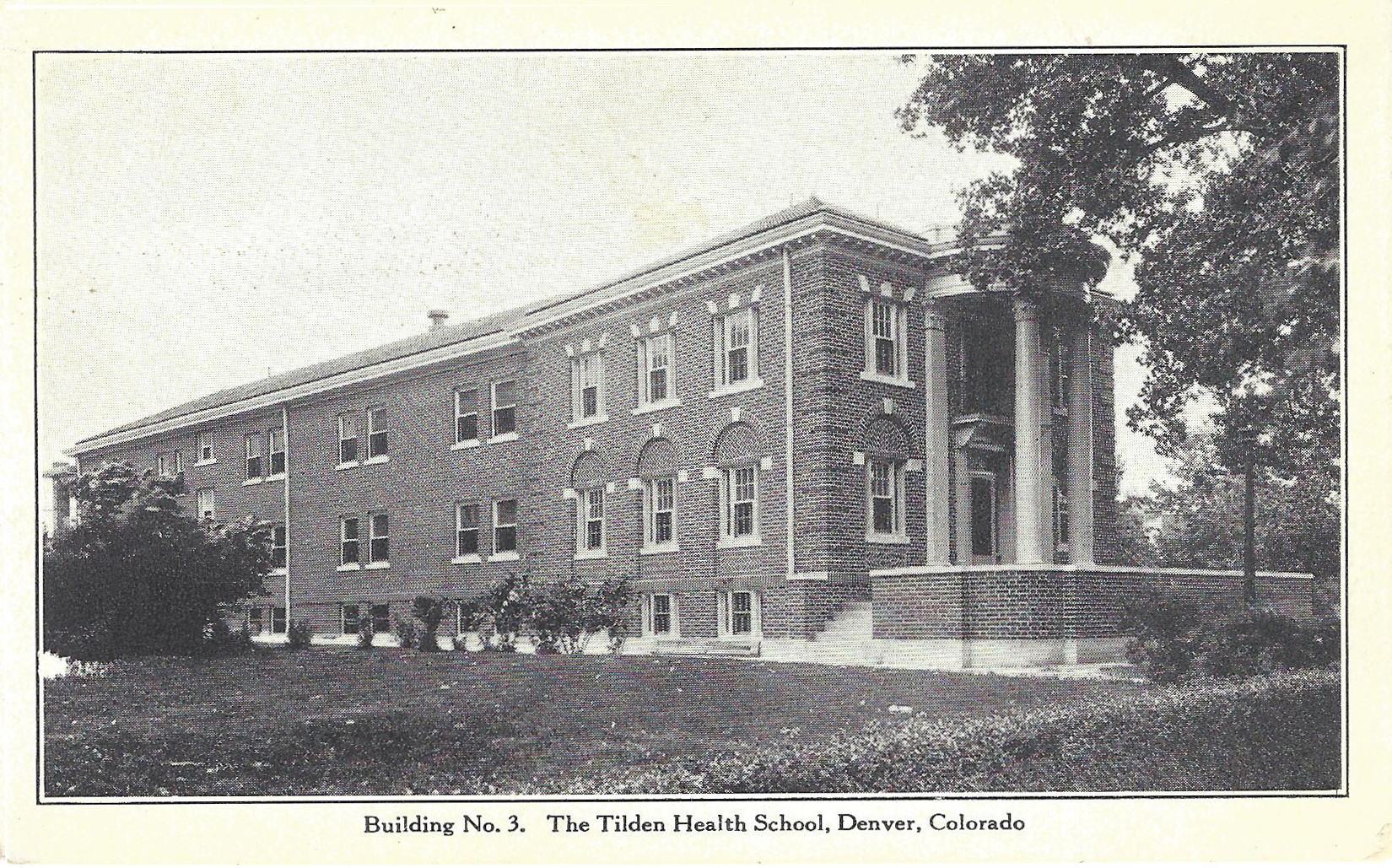
Clinical Building - Tilden School of Health, Denver, Colorado c. 1924

=== Clinical Building ===
The Clinical Building is located at 3289 Grove Street and was also designed by Harry W. J. Edbrooke and erected by the Kirchhof Construction Company in 1923. The classical revival style building was never equipped or furnished for clinical use and patients never lived there. It did house Arthur Vos and his family on the second floor when Vos operated the School from 1924 to 1931.

The building is a three-story hipped roof structure composed of red and dark brown brick on the forward portion of the building and less expensive brick on the side elevations toward the rear and the back. It features a central, rounded, two story portico composed of round columns and squared engaged columns with Corinthian capitals.

When the school closed, the clinical building remained vacant until 1935 when Highland Park Infirmary located there. From 1936 to 1938 the Industrial Clinic Hospital occupied the building. The Adult Blind Home occupied the building from 1940 to the early 1980s. The building is now used as a retirement and an assisted living facility known as Heather Grove.

=== Garage ===
The three car garage behind the Patient Apartments Building was the last building constructed while the Tilden School was in operation. The one-story brick building was constructed in 1924 with a gabled roof with overhanging eaves and exposed rafters. The garage has three sliding wooden garage doors on the southern elevation and one door on the eastern elevation. The rear of the building housed a tool room.

=== Grounds ===
When in operation, the grounds of the Tilden School for Teaching Health were landscaped with walking paths, a formal garden, a fish pond, and a flower garden that provided patients with fresh flowers. The wrought iron street lamps lining the property featured customized globes bearing the name "Tilden". Many of the trees that were planted during the School's operation have grown to maturity and still can be seen on the grounds.

=== Location ===
The Tilden School for Teaching Health was located in the Highland Park subdivision of Denver, Colorado USA. It consisted of five buildings on approximately 3.5 acres of land. The campus encompasses most of the block bounded on the north by West Highland Park Place (formerly known as West Bosler Place), on the east by Grove Street (formerly known as Roxburgh Court), on the south by West Fairview Place and on the west by Irving Street. It was located in the area known as North Denver. Latitude: 39.7616667 Longitude: -105.0266667 GNIS ID: 2113213
