= Cod liver oil =

Dietary supplement derived from liver of cod fish

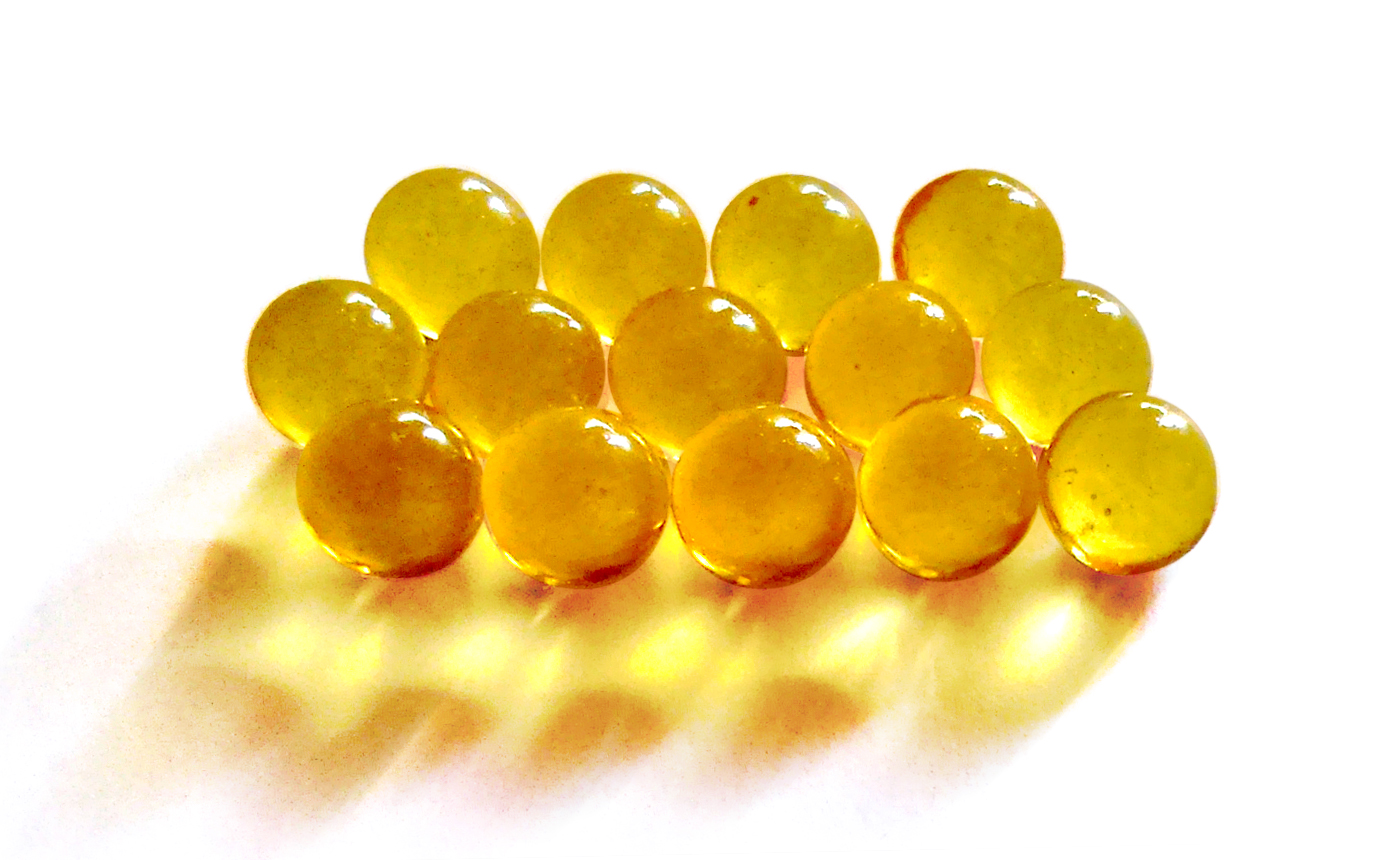
Modern cod liver oil capsules

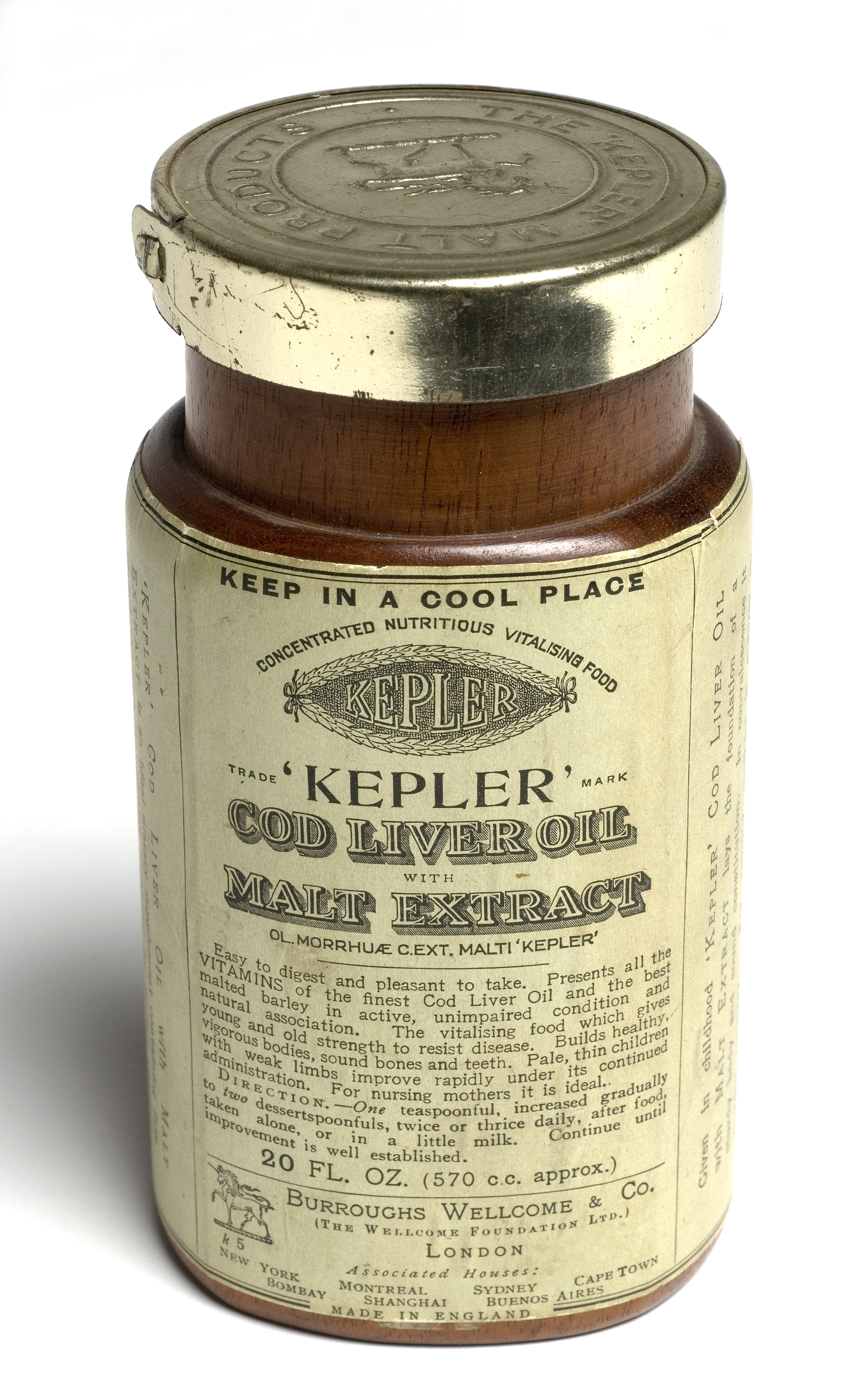
Cod liver oil with malt extract

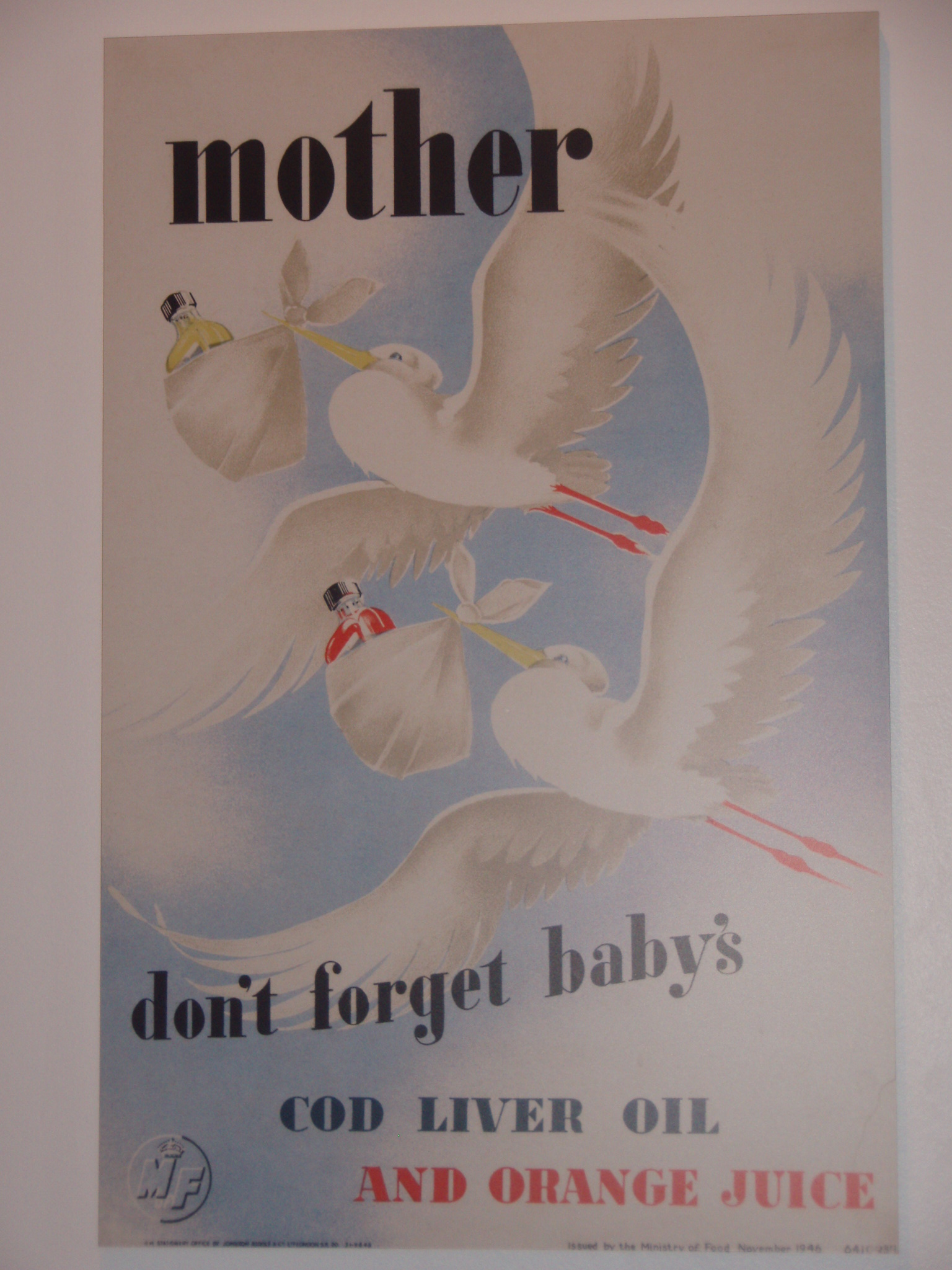
British Ministry of Food (November 1946)

Cod liver oil is a dietary supplement derived from liver of Atlantic cod (Gadus morhua). As with most fish oils, it contains the omega-3 fatty acids eicosapentaenoic acid (EPA) and docosahexaenoic acid (DHA), and also vitamin A and vitamin D.

Historically, it was given to children in the United States in the 19th century as a patent medicine and by the end of the century was being praised by doctors in medical journals. After it was shown, in 1920, that vitamin D deficiency was the cause of rickets, cod liver oil was given as a rich source of vitamin D.

== History ==
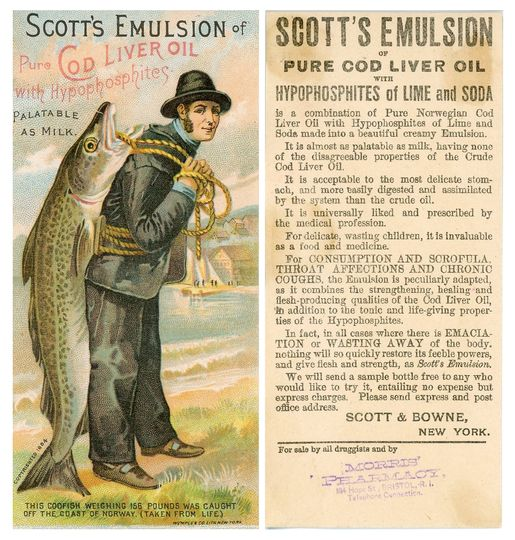
Scott's Emulsion of Pure Cod Liver Oil Trade Card

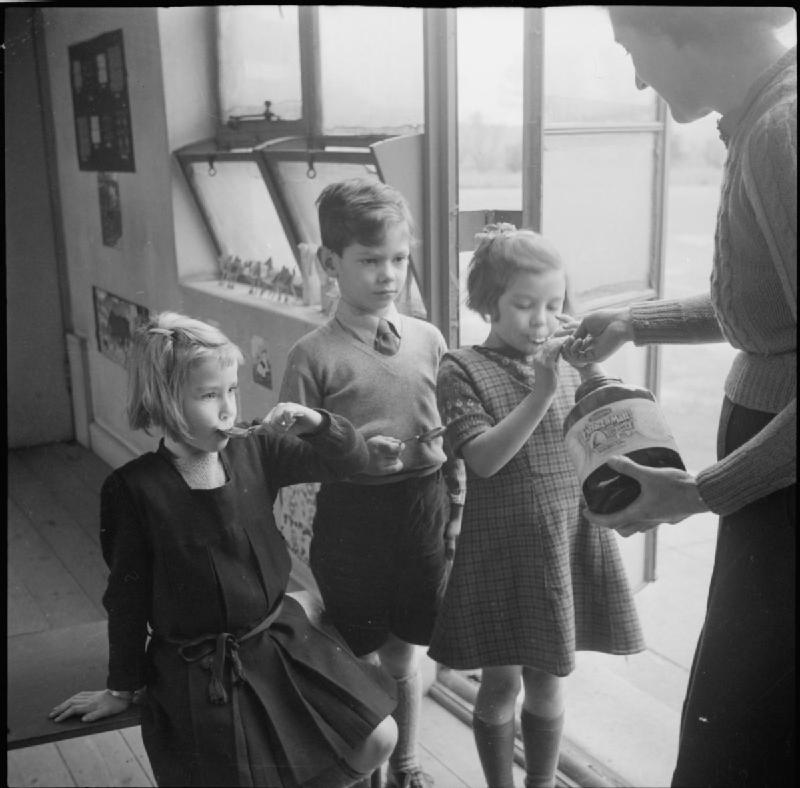
Children being given cod liver oil, Cambridgeshire, England, 1944

In northern European countries, cod liver oil had a long history of folklore medical uses, including applied to the skin and taken orally as a treatment for rheumatism and gout. In the 1800s, cod liver oil became popular as a bottled medicinal product for oral consumption – a teaspoon a day – with both pale and brown oils being used. The trigger for the surge in oral use was the observation made in several European countries starting with Germany in the 1820s and spreading to other countries into the 1860s that young children fed cod liver oil did not develop rickets. In northern Europe and the United States, the practice of giving children cod liver oil to prevent rickets persisted well in the 1950s. This overlapped with the fortification of cow's milk with vitamin D, which began in the early 1930s.

Knowledge of cod liver oil being rickets-preventive in humans carried over to treating animals. In 1899, London surgeon John Bland-Sutton was asked to investigate why litters of lion cubs at the London Zoo were dying with a presentation that included rickets. He recommended that the diets of the pregnant and nursing females and the weaned cubs be switched from lean horse meat to goat – including calcium- and phosphorus-containing bones – and cod liver oil, solving the problem. Subsequently, researchers realized that animal models such as dogs and rats could be used for rickets research, leading to the identification and naming of the responsible vitamin in 1922.

In 1914, American researchers Elmer McCollum and Marguerite Davis had discovered a substance in cod liver oil which later was named "vitamin A". Edward Mellanby, a British researcher, observed that dogs that were fed cod liver oil did not develop rickets, and (wrongly) concluded that vitamin A could prevent the disease. In 1922, McCollum tested modified cod liver oil in which the vitamin A had been destroyed. The modified oil cured the sick dogs, so McCollum concluded the factor in cod liver oil which cured rickets was distinct from vitamin A. He called it vitamin D because it was the fourth vitamin to be named.

Once discovered, vitamins were actively promoted in articles and advertisements in McCall's, Good Housekeeping, and other media outlets. Marketers enthusiastically promoted cod-liver oil, a source of vitamin D, as "bottled sunshine", and bananas as a "natural vitality food".

== Manufacture ==
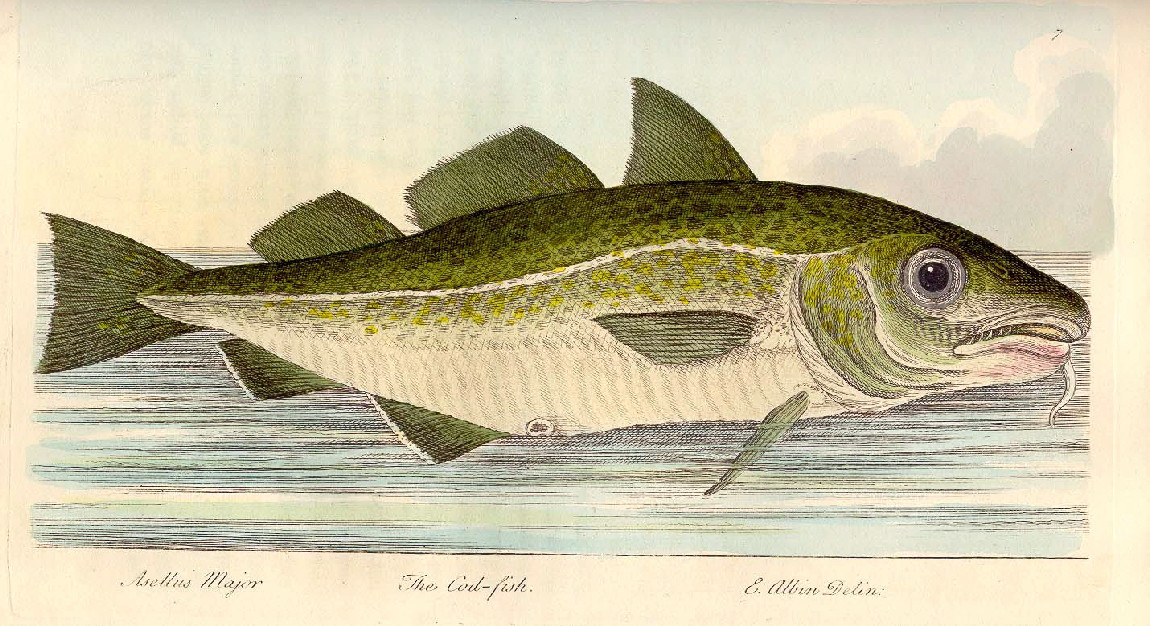
A cod

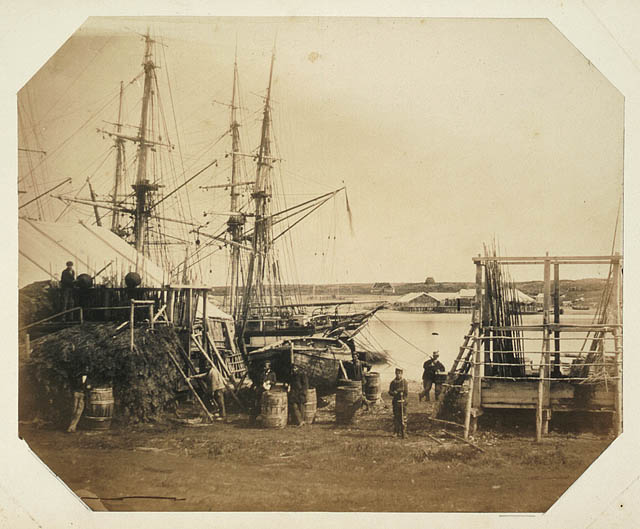
Making and loading of cod liver oil, Conche, Newfoundland, 1857

Cod liver oil has traditionally come in many grades. Cod liver oil for human consumption is pale and straw-colored, with a mild flavor. Scandinavian Vikings produced cod liver oil by laying birch tree branches over a kettle of water, and fresh livers were laid over the branches. The water was brought to a boil and as the steam rose, the oil from the liver dripped into the water and was skimmed off. There was also a method for producing fresh raw cod liver oil.

In the Industrial Revolution, cod liver oil became popular for industrial purposes. Livers placed in barrels to rot, with the oil skimmed off over the season, was the main method for producing this oil. The resulting oil was brown and foul-tasting. In the 1800s cod liver oil became popular as a medicine and both pale and brown oils were used. Brown oils were common because they were cheaper to produce. Some doctors believed in only using the fresh pale oil, while others believed the brown oil was better. The rancid brown oils tended to cause intestinal upset.

The Möller Process was invented by Peter Möller in 1850. The livers are ground with water into a slurry, then this is gently simmered until the oil rises to the top. The oil is skimmed off and purified. Other methods used in modern times include the Cold Flotation Process, pressure extraction, and pressure cooking. These all require further purification steps to get a pure oil.

== Therapeutic uses ==
Though similar in fatty acid composition to other fish oils, cod liver oil has higher concentrations of vitamins A and D. According to the United States Department of Agriculture, a tablespoon (13.6 grams or 14.8 mL) of cod liver oil contains 4,080 μg of vitamin A and 34 μg (1360 IU) of vitamin D. The Dietary Reference Intake of vitamin A is 900 μg per day for adult men and 700 μg per day for women.

Cod liver oil is approximately 20% omega-3 fatty acids. For this reason, cod liver oil may be beneficial in secondary prophylaxis after a heart attack. Diets supplemented with cod liver oil have been demonstrated to have beneficial effects on psoriasis, and daily supplementation has been shown to be correlated with lower rates of high-severity depression.

== Potential adverse effects ==
Retinol (Vitamin A)

For vitamin A, a tablespoon (13.6 g) of cod liver oil contains 136% of the adult UL, 680% of the UL for children ages 1-3 years, and 453% of the UL for children ages 4-8 years. Even a teaspoon a day (1/3 of a tablespoon) exceeds the UL for children ages 1-8 years. Vitamin A accumulates in the liver, and can reach harmful levels sufficient to cause hypervitaminosis A.

Reducing fatty acid oxidation and environmental toxin exposure requires purification processes as part of manufacturing of refined fish oil products.

== Other uses ==
In Newfoundland, cod liver oil was sometimes used as the liquid base for traditional red ochre paint, the coating of choice for use on outbuildings and work buildings associated with the cod fishery.

In Tübingen, Germany, drinking a glass of cod liver oil is the punishment for the participants in the last-place boat at the traditional Stocherkahnrennen, an annual punting boat race.

== See also ==
- Dan Dale Alexander
- Shark liver oil
