= Denver Gas & Electric Building =

Building in Denver, Colorado

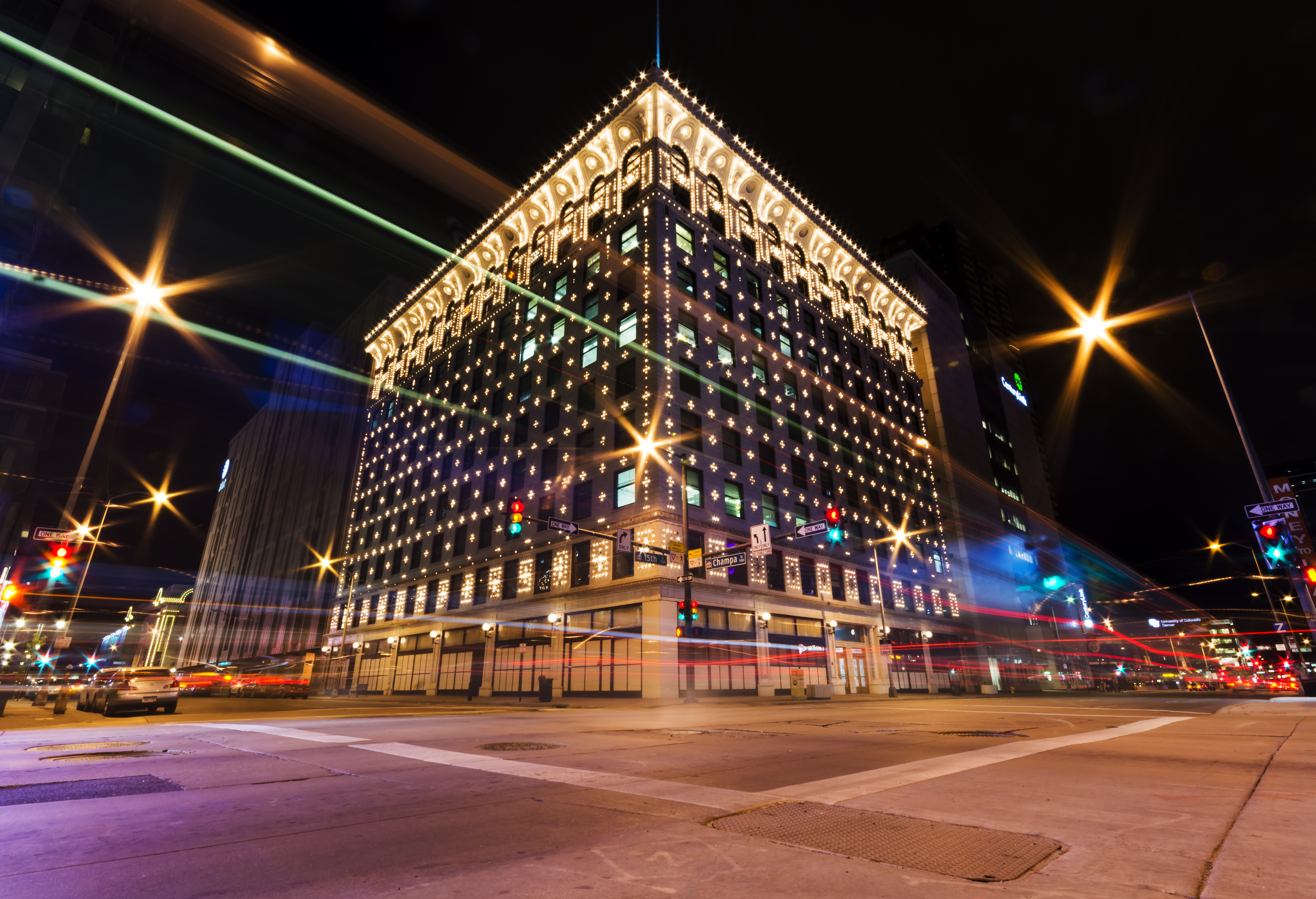
- Interactive map of the Denver Gas & Electric Building area

General information
- Status: Completed
- Architectural style: Chicago School
- Location: 910 15th St., Denver, Colorado, U.S.
- Coordinates: 39°44′44″N 104°59′42″W
- Completed: 1910

Height
- Roof: 140 ft (43 m)

Technical details
- Floor count: 10

Design and construction
- Architect: Harry W. J. Edbrooke
- Main contractor: Frank E. Edbrooke and Company

- Denver Gas & Electric Building
- U.S. National Register of Historic Places
- Colorado State Register of Historic Properties
- NRHP reference No.: 78000851
- CSRHP No.: 5DV.137
- Added to NRHP: 1978-07-20

The Denver Gas & Electric Building, also known as the Public Service Building, the Insurance Exchange Building, and IX-West (Internet Exchange, Denver), is a building located in the downtown district of Denver, Colorado. Designed by architect Harry W. J. Edbrooke for the Denver Gas & Electric Company, the 10 story building was completed in 1910. One of its most striking features is the use of 13,000 electric light bulbs decorating its façade.

In 1978, the building was listed on the National Register of Historic Places.
