= Hinman Apartments =

- U.S. National Register of Historic Places
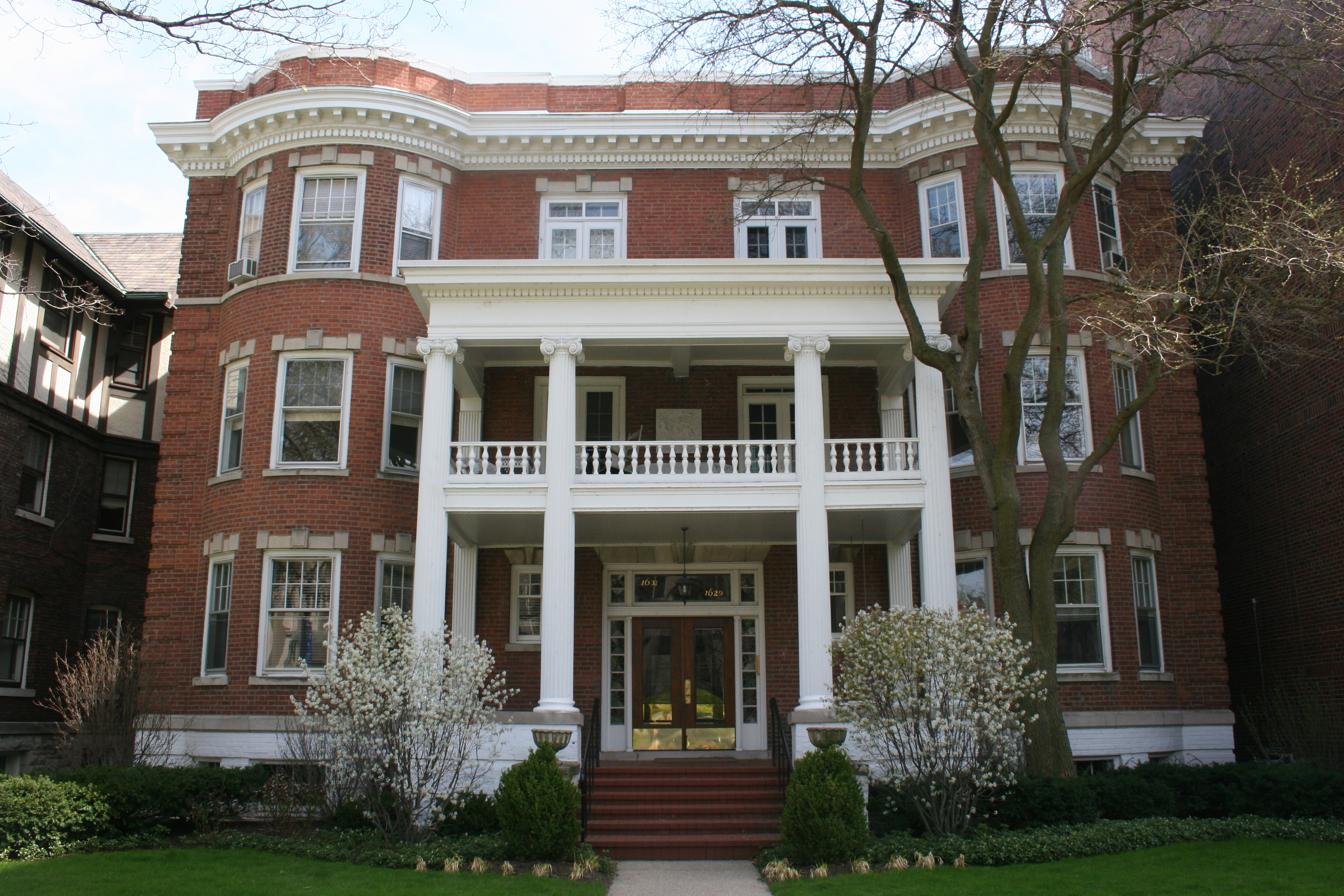
- Hinman Apartments in 2012

- Location within Chicago metropolitan area Location within Illinois Location within the United States
- Location: 1629-1631 Hinman Ave., Evanston, Illinois
- Coordinates: 42°02′48″N 87°40′39″W
- Area: 0.3 acres (0.12 ha)
- Built: 1904
- Architect: Atchison & Edbrooke
- Architectural style: Classical Revival
- MPS: Suburban Apartment Buildings in Evanston TR
- NRHP reference No.: 84000995
- Added to NRHP: March 15, 1984

Hinman Apartments is a historic apartment building at 1629-1631 Hinman Avenue in Evanston, Illinois. Built in 1904, the three-story brick building has six apartments. Architects Atchison & Edbrooke, who also designed Evanston's Ridgewood Apartments, designed the building in the Classical Revival style. The building's design includes a two-story portico supported by Ionic columns, bow windows on either side of the portico, and a dentillated cornice and parapet. The apartments are arranged in a railroad plan, with rooms arranged along a long central hallway; while this layout was often associated with cheap apartments, the Hinman still targeted upper-class residents with its design and amenities.

The building was added to the National Register of Historic Places on March 15, 1984.
