= Dan Dale Alexander =

American pseudoscientific diet advocate (1919–1990)

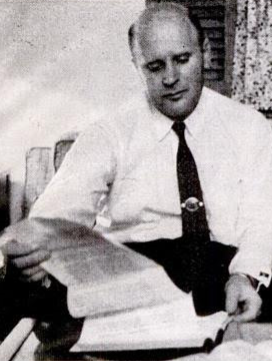
- Born: July 18, 1919; Norwich, Connecticut
- Died: June 15, 1990 (aged 70); Los Angeles
- Occupation: Alternative health writer
- Political party: Democratic
- Spouse: Ida Fischer
- Children: 3

Dan Dale Alexander (July 18, 1919 – June 15, 1990) was an American nutrition influencer, famous for his eccentric beliefs about cod liver oil curing arthritis. He became known as the "Codfather".

== Career ==
Alexander was born in Norwich, Connecticut. He was educated at Norwich Free Academy, Trinity College and Columbia University but failed to obtain any degree as he dropped out. Alexander had no medical credentials. He obtained a Ph.D. from an obscure diploma-mill which he received in the mail from St. Andrew's Ecumenical College, London. He sent a check for $100 to the college as appreciation for receiving it.

Alexander is best known for Arthritis and Common Sense, which sold more than one million copies. He was president of Witkower Press of Hartford, Connecticut, who published the book. He believed that drinking cod liver oil mixed with orange juice could cure arthritis. He appeared on The Johnny Carson Show and The Merv Griffin Show to promote his ideas. His ideas were uncritically accepted in the Los Angeles Times and on radio stations.

== Reception ==
Alexander's statements about cod liver oil curing arthritis have been described by the Federal Trade Commission and medical health experts as deceptive, false, misleading and quackery. The Arthritis and Rheumatism Foundation complained that Alexander's statements were false advertising and unsupported by scientific evidence.

Stephen Barrett and Victor Herbert have written:

[Alexander] concluded that the basic cause of arthritis is "poorly lubricated joints" and that dietary oils (particularly cod liver oil) relieve arthritis by lubricating the joints. This theory is ludicrous. The lubricating fluid within the joints is not oil but a fluid that resembles blood plasma and is secreted by the tissue lining the joints. Moreover, dietary oils can't reach the joints intact because they are broken down into simple substances by the digestive process.

In 1956 the FTC issued an order for Witkower Press to cease falsely advertising Arthritis and Common Sense as reliable treatment for any kind of arthritis or related condition. There were 35 hearings in the case and 3,000 pages of testimony were received. In 1960, Alexander appealed the order without success.

== Publications ==
- Arthritis and Common Sense (1950)
- Good Health and Common Sense (1960)
- Healthy Hair and Common Sense (1969)
- The Common Cold and Common Sense (1971)
- Dry Skin and Common Sense (1978)
