= Anthony Sattilaro =

American physician (1931–1989)

- Born: 1931
- Died: 1989 (aged 57–58)
- Occupation: Physician
- Known for: Promoter of macrobiotics as a cancer cure
- Medical career
- Institutions: Methodist Hospital
- Notable works: Recalled by Life

Anthony J. Sattilaro (1931–1989) was an American physician and vegetarianism activist best known for promoting macrobiotics as a cancer cure, although in some interviews he asserted that there was no definitive evidence to support thisand that he used macrobiotics as a last resort after Western medicine had failed. His views were criticized by medical experts as quackery.

== Biography ==
Sattilaro was the chief executive officer of Methodist Hospital in South Philadelphia. He was diagnosed at the age 49 with prostate cancer with multiple bone metastases. In his book Recalled from Life (1982), he described how macrobiotics had cured his prostate cancer. He stated that a follow-up examination revealed complete resolution of metastatic bone lesions. Sattilaro went on publicity tours and he appeared in magazines and talk shows. In Living Well Naturally (1984), he made the claim that a macrobiotic diet had put his prostate cancer into permanent remission.

In 1989, he died from prostate cancer that his books claimed he had been cured of. According to William T. Jarvis "he eventually died of his disease, but this fact was not mentioned in the macrobiotic press."

== Publications ==
- Recalled by Life (Houghton Mifflin, 1982, 1989) ISBN 0-395-32524-2
- Living Well Naturally (Houghton Mifflin, 1984, 1985)

== See also ==
- Hugh Faulkner (doctor)
- List of unproven and disproven cancer treatments
