= Henry G. Bieler =

American physician (1893–1975)

- Born: April 2, 1893; Milford, Ohio
- Died: October 11, 1975 (aged 82); Capistrano Beach, California
- Occupations: Physician, alternative medicine practitioner

Henry G. Bieler (April 2, 1893 – October 11, 1975) was an American physician and germ theory denialist, best known for his book Food is Your Best Medicine, which advocated the treatment of disease with foods. He is widely recognized as a pioneer in alternative medicine who used non-pharmaceutical, diet-based therapies to treat his patients. Bieler opposed the use of any drugs, including aspirin.

Bieler argued there was only one disease called "toxemia" which he blamed for all human ills. He believed that when people stopped poisoning themselves with high-calorie foods, the body would heal itself. Bieler rejected the germ theory of disease and his ideas were rejected by medical experts as quackery.

== Biography ==
Henry Bieler was born in 1893 in Milford, Ohio. In about 1905 his family moved to Cincinnati. He studied medicine at the Ohio-Miami Medical College and graduating with his MD in 1916. He started his medical practice in West Virginia's coal region, moving to Twin Falls, Idaho in about 1922. In 1926 he moved west to Pasadena, California before settling permanently in Capistrano Beach, California in 1954. He died in his home in 1975.

Bieler did not believe that germs cause disease but are "merely a concomitant of disease." He believed that disease was caused by "toxemia" and could be cured through therapeutic dieting. According to Bieler, "Discarding the germ theory of disease opened the way for me to explore new methods of eliminating the stagnating waste products from the body. Briefly stated, my position is: improper foods cause disease; proper foods cure disease." Bieler was an anti-vaccinationist.

Bieler was often at odds with the American Medical Association because he believed that drugs are harmful and advised his patients to avoid them. His approach to treating his patients may have been very dangerous, had any of them developed a serious illness requiring the use of drugs like antibiotics, one which could not be remedied through lifestyle changes, the illness would have gone untreated and would possibly have resulted in the patients' death.

=== Zucchini "cure all" ===
Bieler promoted pseudoscientific claims of zucchini squash curing disease. Nutritionist Ronald M. Deutsch has criticized Bieler's claims of zucchini squash as a "cure-all". Bieler stated that zucchini could treat toxicities in the body because it is a sodium-rich vegetable. Deutsch noted that a cup of raw zucchini squash contains one milligram of sodium and 2 milligrams cooked. The sodium content is very small compared to a cup of green peas at 458 milligrams or a cup of beef stew over 1,000 milligrams.

Bieler's chemical information was entirely wrong and ideas about nutrients were incorrect. Deutsch noted that Bieler's statements about food "cures" were spurious and he had made basic mistakes because his research on the topic never went through peer-review.

== Famous patients ==
Bieler's reputation of using diet to treat disease attracted numerous celebrity patients such as Greta Garbo, Gloria Swanson and Gloria Stuart. Swanson who suffered from stomach pains visited Bieler for a charge of three dollars. He put her on a "cleansing diet" that consisted of a puree of zucchini, celery and string beans. Swanson stated she felt better on the diet and became a convert to Bielers' dieting ideas which she embraced for many years.

His treatment of actress Allison Hayes was associated with a continued decline in health, later found to result from lead contamination in a bone meal supplement.

== Books ==
In 1965, Bieler wrote the book Food is Your Best Medicine, published by Random House, a compilation of over fifty years of work treating disease by diet. This book, which became a best seller, is still in print (Ballantine Books division of Random House), and has been translated into many other languages. The book was highly controversial at the time. Bieler refused to include any "diets" or recipes in the text because he believed that every person has different body chemistry and, therefore, different needs. In 1972 he wrote a second book, The Natural Way to Sexual Health, with co-author Sarah Nichols, which did have recipes added by his editor/agent between the time he submitted the manuscript and when the book was published.

Doris M. Breitzer in a review of Food is Your Best Medicine stated that "the hazards of a book of this type, obviously addressed to the non-professional public, are the hazards inherent in any possible invitation to self-treatment."

At the time of his death in 1975 he was working on a book called The Incurables, dedicated to the memory of Martin F. Fischer one of his professors from medical school whom he greatly respected. The book dealt with specific diseases like cancer, lupus, diabetes, asthma, epilepsy, gout, and even the common cold. In it, he wrote what he felt caused the disease and how chemistry could be reversed for control or cure. This book was completed by an associate, Reigh Parker-Burch, in 2013 and is titled "Conquering the Incurables".

== Selected publications ==
- Bieler, Henry G. (1928). "Pillars of Salt". The Journal of Laboratory and Clinical Medicine. 13 (12): 1174.
- Bieler, Henry G. (1930). "Pioneers and Quacks". Clinical Medicine and Surgery.
- Bieler, Henry G. (1931). "The Etiology of Pernicious Anemia". Clinical Medicine and Surgery. 38 (9): 635.
- Bieler, Henry G. (1965). Food Is Your Best Medicine. New York: Random House.
- Bieler, Henry G. (1982). Food Is Your Best Medicine. New York: Ballantine Books. ISBN 0-345-35183-5.
- Bieler, Henry G. (1972). Natural Way to Sexual Health. New York: Charles Publishing Company. ISBN 0-912880-03-1.
- Bieler, Henry G. (1973). Modern Madonna. New York: by permission from Charles Block Publishing.

== See also ==
- Arnold Ehret
- John Henry Tilden
