= William Brady (physician) =

American physician

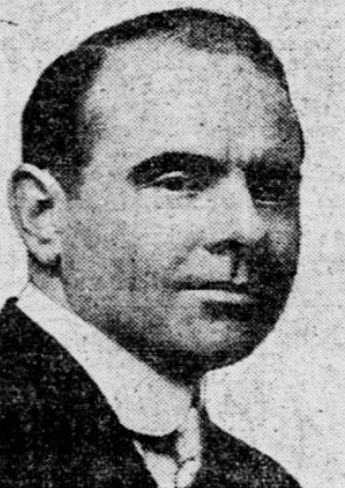
- Born: March 26, 1880; Canandaigua, New York
- Died: February 25, 1972 (aged 91); Beverly Hills, California
- Occupations: Physician, columnist

William Brady (March 26, 1880 – February 25, 1972) was an American physician and pioneering medical columnist.

== Biography ==
Brady was born in Canandaigua, New York. He obtained his M.D. from the University of Buffalo in 1901. He began his medical practice in Buffalo, New York, in 1901. In 1904, he married Cora May McGuire, they had two daughters.

In 1914, Brady started the first syndicated medical column "Personal Health Service" in the Elmira Star-Gazette, which he wrote until his death in 1972. Brady was "America's oldest columnist, in age and in number of years of syndication." He wrote the medical column for 58 years. It was syndicated in daily newspapers throughout the United States.

Brady also edited the medical column "Here's to Health" in the Los Angeles Times. In this column, Brady supported the consumption of saccharin. He recommended it as a substitute for "stout people who are trying to reduce and those who wish to avoid accumulating more slacker flesh". In 1946, he commented that there was "ample scientific evidence" to suggest that anyone could consume up to five grains of saccharine a day. He wrote articles recommending people to take iodine doses. Brady was also supportive of the meat diet of Vilhjalmur Stefansson. In his 1961 book, Brady admitted he held "strange notions" that were based on a "lifetime of sometimes unorthodox observation and practice are geared to keeping patients out of doctors' offices." He died of uremia at his home in Beverly Hills, California.

== Reception ==
Brady was criticized by other physicians for making misrepresentations about medical treatments and promoting dubious health advice. A 1937 article in The Journal of the American Medical Association commented that Brady "has during recent years gradually departed from anything resembling accuracy or established medical science."

A 1946 article in the Journal of the American Dental Association noted that:

For years Brady has tried to pit his stupid assertions against tested scientific knowledge; he has often given dangerous advice that could have a serious detrimental effect on those who heeded it. Time and again leading medical and dental journals have called attention to Brady’s inaccuracies and proved them to be such, but for some reason otherwise reliable newspapers have continued to print his notions and superstitions as a guide to sound health.

The Southern California State Dental Association accused Brady of misinforming his readers on specific dental ailments.

== Selected publications ==
- An 80 Year Old Doctor's Secrets of Positive Health (1961)
