= Adolphus Hohensee =

Fraudulent nutritionist

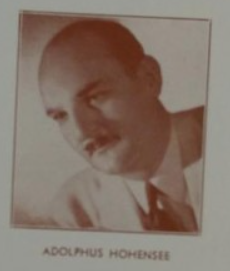
- Born: 1901
- Died: October 5, 1967 (aged 65–66)
- Occupations: Naturopath, writer

Adolphus Hohensee (1901 – October 5, 1967) was a naturopath, fraudulent nutritionist and quack from the twentieth century.

== Career ==
Hohensee described himself as a doctor but held no valid qualifications. It was discovered that his "Doctor of Naturopathy" degree was obtained from two schools he never attended.

He campaigned against processed foods and advertised his mineral and vitamin supplements as a cure for disease. Hohensee was known as the "Peppermint Tea Medicine Man". He was the president of Scientific Living, Inc., and managed a company that manufactured health foods, El Rancho Adolphus Products in Pennsylvania. He was known to lecture and promote dubious claims about his health food products. In 1952, he advertised his peppermint tea as a cure for "gall stones, colic, flatulence, headache, rheumatism, high blood pressure, arthritis, prostate trouble, lumbago, fits, convulsions, colitis, tuberculosis, asthma, pin worms and tape worms."

Hohensee had repeatedly violated the Federal Food, Drug and Cosmetic Act. In 1955, Hohensee and his companies were charged on seven counts of a Federal Grand Jury indictment for misbranding their food products. The companies were fined and Hohensee was sentenced to a year in prison in 1957. Susan Gilbert in Medical Fakes and Frauds noted that "Hohensee was convicted of fraud in 1957, but even before then he was exposed as a hypocrite. A photographer for the Houston Press caught Hohensee in a restaurant gorging himself on processed bread and fried fish and quenching his thirst with beer." In 1962, he was given an eighteen-month prison term for selling honey under false pretences.

Hohensee was influenced by the Bates method and authored the book, Better Eyes Without Glasses (1944).

== Publications ==
- Better Eyes Without Glasses (1944)
- Nature's Key to Youthfulness and Longevity (1948)
- The Adolphus Cook Book of Balanced Meals (1951)
- Constipation: Its Causes, Effects, and Corrections : Appendicitis, Tonsillitis, Arthritis and Longevity (1952)
- How to Think and Attain Success (1952)
- Love, Romance, Sex and Success (1959)
