= Lair Ribeiro =

Brazilian physician and author

Lair Geraldo Theodoro Ribeiro
- Born: July 6, 1945 (age 81); Juiz de Fora, Brazil
- Occupations: Cardiologist, writer
- Notable work: Success Is No Accident

Lair Geraldo Theodoro Ribeiro (born July 6, 1945) is a Brazilian cardiologist and author. He has published books and given lectures on topics related to personal development, communication, and health. His views and recommendations on certain medical topics, particularly regarding alternative therapies, have been the subject of public and scientific criticism.

== Biography ==
Ribeiro was born in 1945 in Juiz de Fora, Brazil. In 1972, he earned his medical degree from the Federal University of Juiz de Fora. He later moved to the United States, where he lived for 17 years and co-authored academic publications associated with institutions such as Harvard Medical School, Baylor College of Medicine, and Thomas Jefferson University.

== Career ==
Ribeiro has authored over 30 books, many focused on self-help, communication skills, and health. Some of his works have been translated into multiple languages and distributed internationally. His book O sucesso não ocorre por acaso (Success Is No Accident) was reported as a bestseller in Brazil.

He is also known for promoting alternative medical practices, including neuro-linguistic programming, the use of coconut oil for treating diseases, and Miracle Mineral Supplement (MMS). These therapies lack support from the scientific community and are widely considered pseudoscientific.

During the COVID-19 pandemic, Ribeiro publicly endorsed the use of chloroquine and ozone therapy as treatments for coronavirus disease 2019, despite the lack of scientific evidence supporting their effectiveness.
