= Lelord Kordel =

American nutritionist (1908-2001)

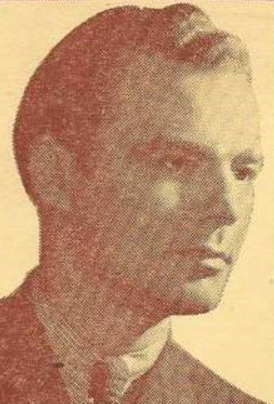
- Kordel in 1941
- Born: Leon Kordelasinski; December 16, 1908; Warsaw, Poland
- Died: July 3, 2001 (aged 92)
- Occupations: Health and nutrition writer

Lelord Kordel (December 16, 1908 – July 3, 2001) was a Polish American nutritionist and author of books on healthy living. He was consulted by top Hollywood stars and earned several awards, but was fined and imprisoned for making false claims about his products. Kordel promoted a low-carbohydrate high-protein fad diet.

== Career ==
Born in Warsaw, Poland, as a child Lelord Kordel emigrated with his parents to the United States and grew up in Chicago, where his father worked as a baker. After university studies in Chicago, Kordel returned to Poland to continue his studies at the University of Krakow. After completion of his Ph.D. in biochemistry in 1930, he worked for two years as a scientific instructor and as a research assistant to the British physician Sir William Arbuthnot-Lane (1931–1932).

When Kordel returned to America in the early 1930s, he opened the California Nutrition Clinic in Beverly Hills. As an independent researcher and industry consultant, he developed programs for healthy living and pioneered concepts for dietary supplementation. During World War II, he conducted and supervised seminars on nutrition for the war effort and was active in the "Food and Nutrition for Victory" programs, for which he earned several awards.

After the war, Kordel began writing books on healthy living and nutrition. While living in Detroit, Michigan, Kordel traveled widely to educate the public on nutrition and balanced diets. His teachings and formulations gained a wide circle of followers, including film stars such as Zsa Zsa Gabor, Eva Gabor, Gloria Swanson and Raquel Welch, who sought his advice on staying healthy and looking well.

He created a health product company in 1949, Kordel's Nutritionals. He was also president of Detroit Vital Foods, Inc.

In 1962, Kordel stated that he had never been ill and he would live to the age of 120 because of his diet.

== Dieting ==
Kordel was an advocate of a low-carbohydrate high-protein diet. He campaigned against high carbohydrate and starch foods such as potatoes. He opposed the use of refined carbohydrates such as white flour and white sugar. He recommended eating much protein with a minimum of carbohydrates. He promoted a diet rich in red meats (except pork), fish, poultry, eggs, dairy foods and raw vegetables. He was fond of liver, brewer's yeast, honey, powered skim milk, seeds, wheat germ and yoghurt. He also promoted lecithin as a "miracle nutrient" and high-dosage vitamin supplements.

Kordel criticized vegetarianism in his writings as a danger to health which he believed was responsible for anemia, malnutrition and nutritional deficiencies. He argued that protein is the key to living and that most vegetarians eat a low-protein diet that fails to satisfy hunger.

Kordel made false statements about dieting, for example linking the overconsumption of carbohydrates with cancer. He also made the false claim that vitamin E foods have a beneficial effect on sex organs and that lack of this vitamin may cause sterility.

== Reception ==
In 1946, Kordel was convicted of misbranding dietary supplements and fined $4,000. For example, he falsely advertised a herbal tablet, "Gotu Kola", as offering "erect posture, sharp eyes, velvety skin, limbs of splendid proportions, deep chest, firm bodies, gracefully curved hips, flat abdomens and even pleasing laughter."

Kordel came into dispute with the Federal Trade Commission in 1957 and Food and Drug Administration in 1961. Whilst president of Detroit Vital Foods, products from the company, "Michigan Brand Korleen Tablets" and "Frutex Fruit Salad" were discovered to be misbranded with false health claims. The products were advertised in Kordel's lectures and publications for treating practically all diseases. After a long appeal process, Kordel was fined $10, 000 and served one year in prison in 1971.

Professor of Bioethics Sana Loue in Forensic Epidemiology: Integrating Public Health and Law Enforcement, noted that:

Kordel had consistently represented in lectures and advertising material that specified chemicals could improve health and that such "natural nutrients" were the constituent elements of the products Korleen and Frutex. It was claimed that Korleen could successfully treat cirrhosis of the liver and eliminate varicose veins. Frutex was claimed to be an effective preventive strategy and cure for bleeding gums, sore throat, earache, swollen neck glands, pneumonia, and acute rheumatism. In the criminal case, both Kordel and Feldten were convicted of having violated provisions of the federal Food, Drug and Cosmetic Act and were fined and sentenced to prison. A fine was also imposed on the company.

Nutritionist Frederick J. Stare included Kordel's Health Through Nutrition in a list of books on nutritional quackery, which "ought not to be on anyone's shelves". A reviewer of Health Through Nutrition in The Quarterly Review of Biology, wrote that the book is "made up of such a weird concoction of science, pseudo-science, and dietary fads that it will be most difficult for the average reader to sift the authentic information from the unauthenticated claims, and to remain unaffected by the latter."

== Publications ==
- Health the Easy Way (1946)
- Health Through Nutrition (1950)
- Eat and Grow Younger (1952)
- Lady, be Loved! (1953)
- Sexual Vigor and Nutrition (1953)
- Eat Your Troubles Away (1955)
- Live to Enjoy the Money You Make (1956)
- How to Make People Like You (1959)
- Cook Right – Live Longer (1962)
- Eat and Grow Slender (1962)
- Eat Your Way to Happiness (1962)
- Eat Right and Live Longer (1965)
- How to Keep Your Youthful Vitality After Forty (1969),
- Secrets for Staying Slim (1972)
- Natural Folk Remedies (1974)
- Health the Easy Way (1976)
- You're Younger Than You Think (1976)
- The Easy, Low-Cost Way to Total Beauty, (Putnam Publishing Group, 1979, ISBN 0-399-11914-0)
- Total Beauty the Kordel Way (1983)

== Gallery ==
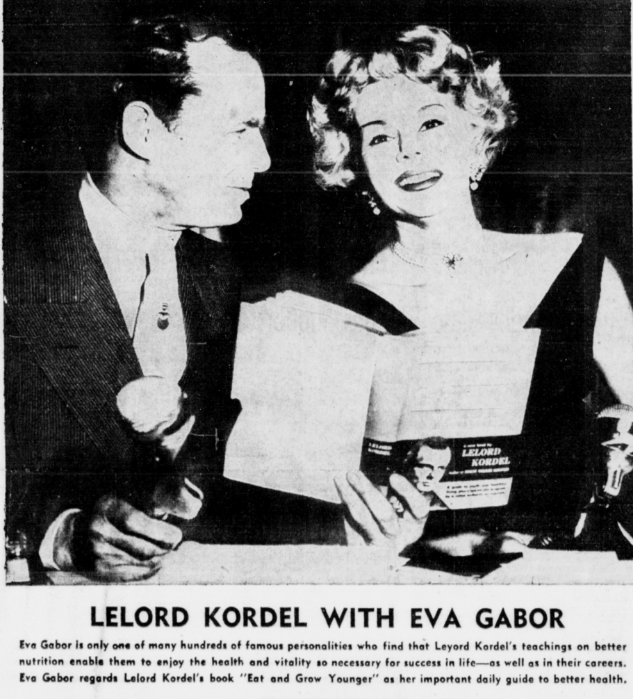
Kordel with Eva Gabor, 1956

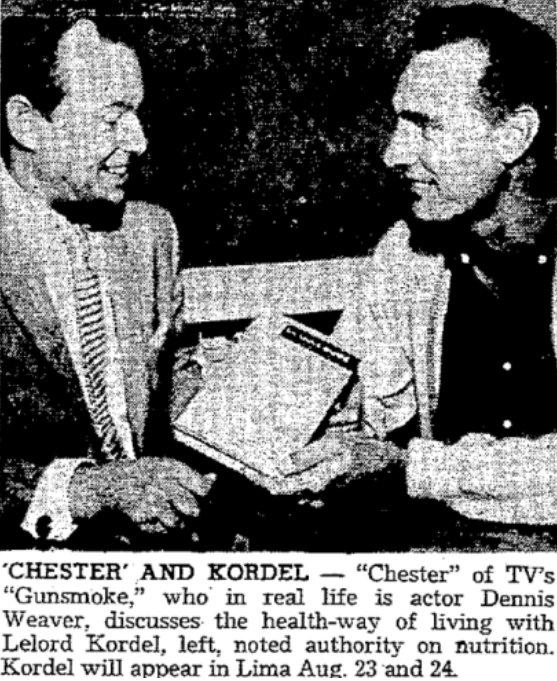
Kordel with Dennis Weaver, 1960

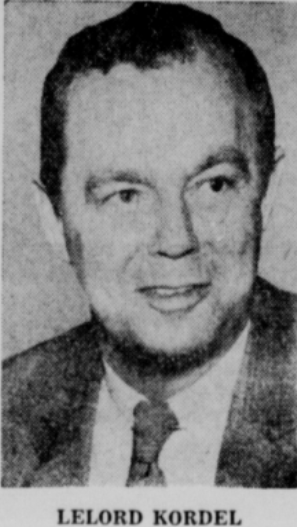
Kordel in 1961
