= John Henry Tilden =

American physician

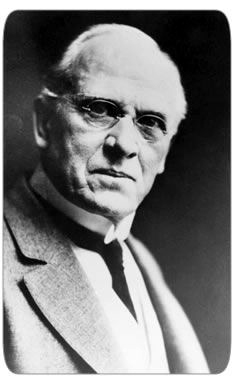
- Tilden in 1918
- Born: 21 January 1851; Van Burensburg, Illinois
- Died: 1 September 1940; Denver, Colorado
- Scientific career
- Fields: Medicine

John Henry Tilden (January 21, 1851 – September 1, 1940) was an American physician and natural hygiene proponent best known in circles of alternative healthcare for his criticism of pharmaceutics and for his theory explaining disease via "toxaemia" which influenced the field of naturopathy.

== Career ==
Tilden was born in Van Burensburg, Illinois, on January 21, 1851. He began studying medicine under the supervision of his father, Joseph G. Tilden MD. At age 17, the younger Tilden joined the medical office of J. Fellows, of Nokomis, Illinois, and studied medicine another two years. In 1872, Tilden graduated from the Eclectic Medical Institute of Cincinnati, and practiced in Nokomis for eight years. Meanwhile, in 1877, he took a post-graduate course at the American Medical College at St. Louis, Missouri.

In 1879, Tilden moved to St. Louis, and, at the college, lectured in anatomy and physiology for two years. In 1881, he moved to Litchfield, Illinois, where, practicing four years, he "established a fine reputation." In June 1882, he was elected Adjunct Professor of Anatomy in St. Louis. In 1886, Tilden moved to Wichita, Kansas, where he drew acclaim, and in 1890, moved to Denver, Colorado. In 1916, he established the Tilden School for Teaching Health as a private residential teaching institution and sanitarium where he offered patients his alternative to the standard medical practices of the day.

== Personal life ==
In 1873, Tilden married Rebecca Maddux, a native of Hillsboro, Illinois, and daughter of Nathaniel Maddux. They had two children, a daughter, Edna, born in 1876, and Elsie, born in 1878 (who died in 1884). Tilden was "a prominent member of the National Eclectic Medical Society, and also of the State Medical Society, of Illinois."

He died in Denver, Colorado, on September 1, 1940, at age 89.

== Healthcare views ==
Early in practice, doubting drug treatment, Tilden began favoring preventive healthcare. In this interest, he began publishing a monthly magazine, The Stuffed Club, in 1900. It was renamed The Philosophy of Health in 1915, and renamed Health Review and Critique in 1926. Also in 1926, Tilden published the book Toxaemia Explained: The True Interpretation of the Cause of Disease.

Tilden's concept of toxaemia was based on the philosophy of vitalism. He argued that toxins may externally enter the body through breathing and food or may be internally produced by metabolism in the cells and if these toxins are not expelled they will accumulate in the blood, disrupting the flow of the vital force in the body, resulting in toxaemia. Historian Victoria Sheldon has noted that "By linking vital force with naturalistic concepts of inner blood, cells and the looming danger of outer pollutants, Tilden forwarded the American naturopathic stance that modernity was often harmful and causative of disease."

Years later, Henry Bieler mentioned Tilden as one of his own influences. Tilden's views about toxaemia influenced Harvey and Marilyn Diamond's book Fit For Life.

== Reception ==
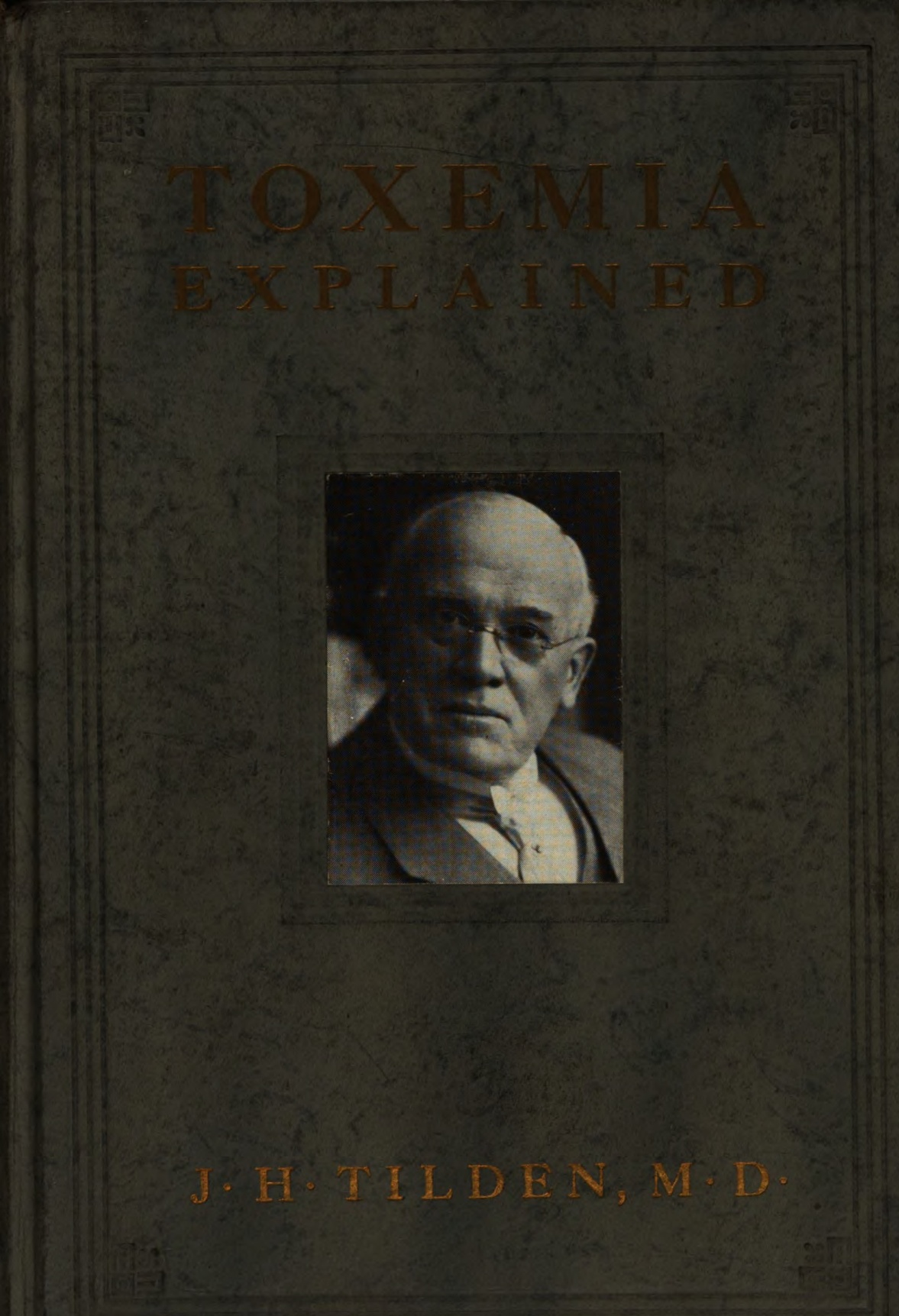
Tilden's Toxemia Explained, published in 1926

Tilden's claims that all diseases are the result of "toxaemia" are regarded as quackery by medical experts. He was described as a food faddist and quack by the American Medical Association.

Harriet A. Hall of Science-Based Medicine wrote that Tilden's concept of toxaemia had no experimental evidence and was based on errors, distortions and speculation. She concluded that "It was not entirely unreasonable for him to think that way in 1926, but his ideas have been completely superseded by 8 decades of advances in microbiology, genetics, histology, immunology, physiology, and other disciplines."

== Selected publications ==
- Cholera Infantum (1909)
- Epilepsy (1918)
- Typhoid Fever (1909)
- Criticisms of the Practice of Medicine (1910)
- Diseases Of Women and Easy Childbirth (1912)
- Gonorrhea and Syphilis (1912)
- Food: Its Influence as a Factor in Disease and Health (1914)
- Appendicitis (1921)
- Care of Children (1920)
- Impaired Health I (1921)
- Impaired Health II (1921)
- Constipation - A New Reading on the Subject (1923)
- Food I - Its Composition, Preparation, Combination, and Effects, with Appendix on Cooking (1914)
- Food II - Its Influence as a Factor in Disease and Health (1916)
- Pocket Dietitian (1925)
- Toxaemia Explained: The True Interpretation of the Cause of Disease (1926)
