= Ridgewood (Evanston, Illinois) =

- U.S. National Register of Historic Places
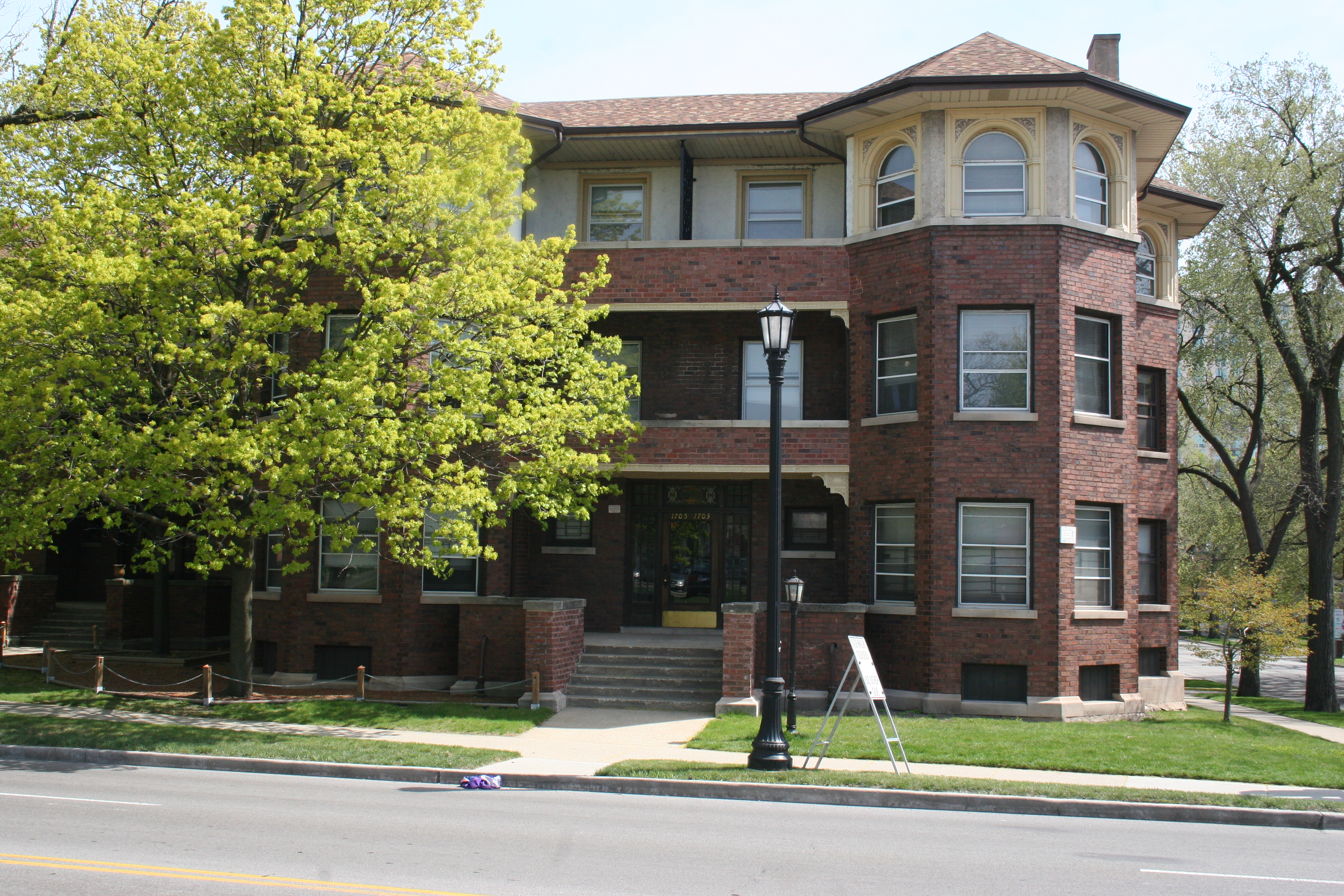

- Location within Illinois
- Location: 1703--1713 Ridge Ave., Evanston, Illinois
- Coordinates: 42°2′56″N 87°41′18″W
- Area: 0.4 acres (0.16 ha)
- Built: 1905
- Architect: Atchison & Edbrooke
- Architectural style: Prairie School
- NRHP reference No.: 78001136
- Added to NRHP: October 4, 1978

Ridgewood is a historic apartment building located at 1703–1713 Ridge Avenue (at Church Street) in Evanston, Illinois. The Chicago architectural firm of Atchison & Edbrooke designed the building in 1905; while the firm was only active from 1904 to 1908, it designed several buildings in Evanston. The building has a Prairie School design, a popular residential style at the time that was nonetheless unusual for an apartment complex. The three-story brick building is shaped in a "U" and features half-octagonal bays at regular intervals. Six apartments are on each floor; each features Prairie woodwork, cabinets built into the walls, and a fireplace.

The building was added to the National Register of Historic Places on October 4, 1978.
