= List of diets =

An individual's diet is the sum of food and drink that one habitually consumes. Dieting is the practice of attempting to achieve or maintain a certain weight through diet. People's dietary choices are often affected by a variety of factors, including ethical and religious beliefs, clinical need, or a desire to control weight.

Not all diets are considered healthy. Some people follow unhealthy diets through habit, rather than through a conscious choice to eat unhealthily. Terms applied to such eating habits include "junk food diet" and "Western diet". Many diets are considered by clinicians to pose significant health risks and minimal long-term benefit. This is particularly true of "crash" or "fad" diets – short-term, weight-loss plans that involve drastic changes to a person's normal eating habits.

Only diets covered on Wikipedia are listed under alphabetically sorted headings.

== Belief-based diets ==
Some people's dietary choices are influenced by their religious, spiritual or philosophical beliefs.

- Buddhist diet: While Buddhism does not have specific dietary rules, some Buddhists practice vegetarianism based on Mahayana Buddhism's strict interpretation of the first of the Five Precepts.
- Hindu diet: It is popular for followers of Hinduism to follow lacto vegetarian diets (though most do not), based on the principle of ahimsa (non-harming). Consuming beef/cattle is forbidden or at least taboo among followers due to cow veneration. Most Hindus in India do intentionally limit their meat consumption one way or another.
- Jain diet: Due to how the Jain faith interprets ahisma, vegetarianism is considered mandatory for followers; a lacto-vegetarian diet or vegan diet in particular is considered appropriate for Jains. Most Jains also abstain from consuming root vegetables in order to prevent harming insects, worms and microorganisms when they are uprooted. Most also partake in some form of fasting. Some variants of Jainism further discourage or forbid the consumption of honey, fungi, alcoholic beverages and fermented foods.
- Islamic diet: Muslims follow a diet consisting solely of food that is halal – permissible in Islam. The opposite of halal is haraam, food that is Islamically impermissible. Haraam substances include carnivores, pork and other non-ruminant animals, and any meat from an animal that was not killed through the Islamic method of ritual slaughter (Dhabihah). If an otherwise Halal animal was subject to torture by humans, its meat can still be considered non-permissible for Muslims.
- I-tal: A set of principles that influences the diet of many members of the Rastafari movement. One principle is that natural foods should be consumed. Emphasis is put on consuming produce that is fresh, organic and ideally grown at home or locally. Another principle involves avoiding "unclean" types of food; the definition of which is influenced by Biblical teachings. In order to preserve "life energy" Rastafarians encourage teetotalism, and many Rastafarians interpret I-tal to advocate vegetarianism or veganism as well. Many followers do view seafood as an acceptable addition to an I-tal diet but they restrict which kinds they permit; fish over a foot long are typically avoided and all shellfish are eschewed as they are not kosher animals—unlike finned-fish with scales.
- Kosher diet: Food permissible under kashrut, the set of Jewish dietary laws, is said to be kosher. Some foods and food combinations are non-kosher, and failure to prepare food in accordance with kashrut can make otherwise permissible foods non-Kosher.
- Seventh-day Adventist diet: Combines the kosher food rules of Judaism with prohibitions against alcoholic beverages and (sometimes) caffeinated beverages. There is emphasis on consuming whole foods. Meat-consumption is heavily discouraged but not necessarily disallowed; about half of Adventists are lacto-ovo-vegetarians. Vegan and pescetarian diets are also more popular among Adventists compared to the general public but other Adventists are still willing to eat Kosher meats.
- Word of Wisdom diet: The name of a section of the Doctrine and Covenants, a book of scripture accepted by members of the Church of Jesus Christ of Latter-day Saints. Dietary advice includes (1) wholesome plants "in the season thereof", (2) eating meat sparingly and only "in times of winter, or of cold, or famine", and (3) grain as the "staff of life". Unlike injunctions against tobacco, alcohol, coffee and tea—compliance with meat-avoidance has always remained optional among the Church of Jesus Christ of Latter-day Saints and emphasis on refraining from meat has largely been dropped. An official church publication states, "modern methods of refrigeration now make it possible to preserve meat in any season".

== Calorie and weight control diets ==
A desire to lose weight is a common motivation to change dietary habits, as is a desire to maintain an existing weight. Many weight loss diets are considered by some to entail varying degrees of health risk, and some are not widely considered to be effective. This is especially true of "crash" or "fad" diets.

Many of the diets listed below could fall into more than one subcategory. Where this is the case, it is noted in that diet's entry.

=== Low-calorie diets ===
- 5:2 diet: an intermittent fasting diet
- Intermittent fasting: Cycling between non-fasting and fasting as a method of calorie restriction.
- Body for Life: A calorie-control diet, promoted as part of the 12-week Body for Life program.
- Cookie diet: A calorie control diet in which low-fat cookies are eaten to quell hunger, often in place of a meal.
- The Hacker's Diet: A calorie-control diet from The Hacker's Diet by John Walker. The book suggests that the key to reaching and maintaining the desired weight is understanding and carefully monitoring calories consumed and used.
- Nutrisystem diet: The dietary element of the weight-loss plan from Nutrisystem, Inc. Nutrisystem distributes low-calorie meals, with specific ratios of fats, proteins and carbohydrates.
- Weight Watchers diet: Debuting in 1961, foods are assigned point values; dieters can eat any food with a point value provided they stay within their daily point limit.

==== Very low calorie diets ====
A very low calorie diet is consuming fewer than 800 calories per day. Such diets are normally followed under the supervision of a doctor. Zero-calorie diets are also included.

- Inedia (breatharian diet): A diet in which no food is consumed, based on the belief that prana but not food is necessary for human subsistence.
- KE diet (feeding tube diet): A diet in which an individual feeds through a feeding tube and does not eat anything.
- The Last Chance diet: General premise is that the dieter will consume only one low-calorie high protein beverage daily. This equated to no more than 400 calories per day.
- Tongue Patch Diet: Stitching a Marlex patch to the tongue to make eating painful. Daily calories are then limited to 800 per day maximum in liquid form.

=== Low-carbohydrate diets ===
- Atkins diet: A low-carbohydrate diet, popularized by nutritionist Robert Atkins in the late-20th and early-21st centuries. Proponents argue that this approach is a more successful way of losing weight than low-calorie diets; critics argue that a low-carb approach poses increased health risks. The Atkins diet consists of four phases (Induction, Balancing, Fine-Tuning and Maintenance) with a gradual increase in consumption of carbohydrates as the person goes through the phases.
- Dukan Diet: A multi-step diet based on high protein and limited carbohydrate consumption. It starts with two steps intended to facilitate short term weight loss, followed by two steps intended to consolidate these losses and return to a more balanced long-term diet.
- Kimkins: A heavily promoted diet for weight loss, found to be fraudulent.
- South Beach Diet: Diet developed by the Miami-based cardiologist Arthur Agatston in 2003, who says that the key to losing weight quickly and getting healthy is not cutting all carbohydrates and fats from the diet, but choosing the right carbs and the right fats.
- Stillman diet: A carbohydrate-restricted diet that predates the Atkins diet, allowing consumption of specific food ingredients.

=== Low-fat diets ===
- McDougall's starch diet is a high calorie, high fiber, low fat diet that is based on starches such as potatoes, rice, and beans that excludes all animal foods and added vegetable oils. John A. McDougall draws on historical observation of how many civilizations around the world throughout time have thrived on starch foods.

== Crash diets ==
Crash diets are very-low-calorie diets used for the purpose of very fast weight loss. They describe diet plans that involve making extreme, rapid changes to food consumption, but are also used as disparaging terms for common eating habits that are considered unhealthy. This diet is dangerous and can lead to sudden death when not done in a medically supervised setting. Several diets listed here are weight-loss diets that would also fit into other sections of this list. Where this is the case, it is noted in that diet's entry.

- Beverly Hills Diet: An extreme diet from 1981 that has only fruits in the first days, gradually increasing the selection of foods up to the sixth week.
- Cabbage soup diet: A low-calorie diet based on heavy consumption of cabbage soup. Considered a fad diet.
- Grapefruit diet: A fad diet begun in 1930, intended to facilitate weight loss, in which grapefruit is consumed in large quantities at meal times.
- Monotrophic diet: A diet that involves eating only one food item, or one type of food, for a period of time to achieve a desired weight reduction.
- Pro-ana diet: Crash diets usually found on online eating disorder communities. They involve fasting and eating very low amounts of calories for a set amount of days, sometimes as low as 200.
- Subway diet: A crash diet in which a person consumes Subway sandwiches in place of higher calorie fast foods. Made famous by former obese student Jared Fogle, who lost 245 pounds after replacing his meals with Subway sandwiches as part of an effort to lose weight.

== Detox diets ==
Detox diets involve either not consuming or attempting to flush out substances that are considered unhelpful or harmful. Examples include restricting food consumption to foods without colorings or preservatives, taking supplements, or drinking large amounts of water. The latter practice in particular has drawn criticism, as drinking significantly more water than recommended levels can cause hyponatremia. There is no scientific evidence of any benefit from detox diets, and so they are considered to be pseudoscientific.

- Juice fasting: A form of detox diet, in which nutrition is obtained solely from fruit and vegetable juices. The health implications of such diets are disputed.
- Master Cleanse: A modified juice fast that substitutes tea and lemonade for food.

== Diets followed for medical reasons ==
People's dietary choices are sometimes affected by intolerance or allergy to certain types of food. There are also dietary patterns that might be recommended, prescribed or administered by medical professionals for people with specific medical needs.

- DASH diet (Dietary Approaches to Stop Hypertension): A recommendation that those with high blood pressure consume large quantities of fruits, vegetables, whole-grains and low fat dairy foods as part of their diet, and avoid sugar sweetened foods, red meat and fats. Promoted by the US Department of Health and Human Services, a United States government organisation.
- Diabetic diet: An umbrella term for diets recommended to people with diabetes. There is some disagreement in the scientific community as to what sort of diet is best for people with diabetes.
- Elemental diet: A medical, liquid-only diet, in which liquid nutrients are consumed for ease of ingestion.
- Elimination diet: A method of identifying foods that cause a person adverse effects, by process of elimination.
- Gluten-free diet: A diet that avoids the protein gluten, which is found in barley, rye and wheat. It is a medical treatment for gluten-related disorders, which include coeliac disease, non-celiac gluten sensitivity, gluten ataxia, dermatitis herpetiformis and wheat allergy.
- Gluten-free, casein-free diet: A gluten-free diet that also avoids casein, a protein commonly found in milk and cheese. This diet has been researched for efficacy in treatment of autism spectrum disorder.
- Healthy kidney diet: This diet is for those with chronic kidney disease, those with only one kidney, those who have a kidney infection and those who have some other kidney disorder. This is not the renal diet for those on dialysis. The healthy kidney diet limits protein, potassium, and phosphorus-rich foods and beverages, and often liquids.
- Ketogenic diet: A high-fat, low-carb diet, in which dietary and body fat is converted into energy. It is used as a medical treatment for refractory epilepsy.
- Liquid diet: A diet in which only liquids are consumed. May be administered by clinicians for medical reasons, such as after a gastric bypass or to prevent death through starvation from a hunger strike.
- Low-FODMAP diet: A diet that consists in the global restriction of all fermentable carbohydrates (FODMAPs)
- Renal diet: A diet for individuals with chronic kidney disease or who are on dialysis. Diet includes the restriction of fluids and electrolytes including sodium, phosphorus, potassium, and calcium
- Soft diet: A diet which only involves soft foods. It is used for people who have difficulty chewing food, including people with some types of dysphagia (difficulty swallowing), the loss of some or all teeth, pain from recently adjusted or new dental braces, or surgery involving the jaw, mouth, or gastrointestinal tract.
- Specific carbohydrate diet: A diet that aims to restrict the intake of complex carbohydrates such as found in grains and complex sugars.

== Fad diets ==
A fad diet is a diet that is popular for a time, similar to fads in fashion, without being an evidence-based dietary recommendation, and often promising unreasonably fast weight loss or nonsensical health improvements. There is no single definition of what a fad diet is, encompassing a variety of diets with different approaches and evidence bases, and thus different outcomes, advantages and disadvantages, and it is ever-changing. Generally, fad diets promise short-term changes with little effort, and thus may lack educating consumers about whole-diet, whole lifestyle changes necessary for sustainable health benefits. Fad diets are often promoted with exaggerated claims, such as rapid weight loss of more than 1 kg/week or improving health by "detoxification", or even dangerous claims.

Since the "fad" qualification varies over time, social, cultural and subjective view, this list cannot be exhaustive, and fad diets may continue or stop being fads, such as the Mediterranean diet. Some of them have therapeutic indications, such as epilepsy or obesity, and there is no one-size-fits-all diet that would be a panacea for everyone to lose weight or look better. Dieticians are a regulated profession that can distinguish nutritionally sound diets from unhealthy ones.

=== Food-specific diets ===
- Alkaline diet
- Baby food diet
- Banana and skim milk diet, a 1934 fad in the US, supported by a banana importer.
- Cabbage soup diet, a recurring fad diet that dates back to the 1950s
- Carnivore diet
- Clean eating
- Cookie diet
- Egg and wine diet
- Food combining diet: A nutritional approach where certain food types are deliberately consumed together or separately. For instance, some weight control diets suggest that proteins and carbohydrates should not be consumed in the same meal.
- Fit for Life diet: Recommendations include not combining protein and carbohydrates, not drinking water at meal time, and avoiding dairy foods.
- Fruitarianism
- Gluten free diet, while essential for people with celiac disease or gluten sensitivity, has also become a fad.
- Grapefruit diet
- Lamb chop and pineapple diet
- M-plan diet
- Macrobiotics, a fad diet in the 1960s
- Morning banana diet
- Mucusless Diet
- Paleolithic diet: Can refer either to the eating habits of humans during the Paleolithic era, or of modern dietary plans purporting to be based on these habits. The modern version was popular in the 2010s.
- Pegan diet
- Rhubarb diet
- Superfood diet
- Whole30 diet

=== Low-carbohydrate / high-fat diets ===
- Low-carbohydrate diet
- Atkins diet, from 1994
- Bulletproof diet
- Drinking Man's Diet, publicized in 1964 and promoting a high-fat, low-carb diet with alcoholic beverages
- Dukan Diet
- Hamptons Diet
- "Keto" or ketogenic diet (but for the purpose of weight loss instead of epilepsy-seizure reduction)
- Pioppi Diet
- Protein Power
- Rosedale diet
- Salisbury diet
- Stillman diet
- Sugar Busters
- Zone diet: A diet in first published in 1995 in which a person attempts to split calorie intake from carbohydrates, proteins and fats in a 40:30:30 ratio.
- Other high-fat variants.
- Scarsdale medical diet
- South Beach Diet
- The 4-Hour Body

=== High-carbohydrate / low-fat diets ===
- F-plan
- Ornish diet
- McDougall diet
- Pritikin Diet: A diet that focuses on the consumption of unprocessed food.
- Rice diet
- The Good Carbohydrate Revolution

=== Liquid diets ===
- Liquid diets
- Cambridge Diet
- Slim-Fast
- KE diet

=== Fasting ===
- 5:2 diet
- Breatharian diet: A diet based on a belief that people can sustain with spirituality and sunlight alone, but leads to starvation and devotees have been spotted eating and drinking in hiding.
- Dubrow Diet
- Intermittent fasting
- Juice fasting
- Orthopathy
- Protein-sparing modified fast
- Sleeping Beauty diet, a 1976 diet in which people were sedated with drugs so they would not eat for several days.

=== Detoxifying ===
- Detox diet
- Fat Flush Plan
- Lemon detox diet
- Activated charcoal diet
- Wheatgrass diet

=== Other fad diets ===
- Blood type diet: A 1996 diet based on a belief that people's diets should reflect their blood types.
- Cotton ball diet
- Immune Power Diet
- Werewolf diet

== Vegetarian diets ==
A vegetarian diet is one that excludes meat. Vegetarians also avoid food containing by-products of animal slaughter, such as animal-derived rennet and gelatin.

- Fruitarian diet: A diet that predominantly consists of raw fruit.
- Lacto vegetarianism: A vegetarian diet that includes certain types of dairy, but excludes eggs and foods that contain animal rennet. A common diet among followers of several religions, including Hinduism, Sikhism and Jainism, based on the principle of Ahimsa (non-harming).
- Ovo vegetarianism: A vegetarian diet that includes eggs, but excludes dairy.
- Ovo-lacto vegetarianism: A vegetarian diet that includes eggs and dairy.
- Vegan diet: In addition to the abstentions of a vegetarian diet, vegans do not use any product produced by animals, such as eggs, dairy products, or honey. The vegan philosophy and lifestyle is broader than just the diet and also includes abstaining from using any products tested on animals and often campaigning for animal welfare and animal rights.

=== Semi-vegetarian diets ===
- Semi-vegetarianism: A predominantly vegetarian diet, in which meat is occasionally consumed. This includes "flexitarian", reducetarian and demitarian diets Sometimes semi-vegetarian and flexitarian diets are defined as distinct from one another, where the former is defined as abstaining from red meat while the latter simply entails only eating meat infrequently.
- Pescetarianism: A diet that includes seafood, but not poultry, other white meat or meat from mammals.
- Pollotarianism: A diet that includes poultry, but no other white meat, seafood or meat from mammals.
- Kangatarian: A diet originating from Australia. In addition to foods permissible in a vegetarian diet, kangaroo meat is also consumed. The name is a protologism that may have started out as a joke rather than a dietary term or identifying label that was ever intended to be taken seriously or used unironically.
- Planetary health diet: Dietary paradigms that have the following aims: to feed a growing world's population, to greatly reduce the worldwide number of deaths caused by poor diet, and to be environmentally sustainable as to prevent the collapse of the natural world.
- Plant-based diet: A broad term to describe diets in which animal products do not form a large proportion of the diet. Under some definitions a plant-based diet is fully vegetarian; under others it is possible to follow a plant-based diet whilst occasionally consuming meat.

== Other diets ==
- Alkaline diet: The avoidance of relatively acidic foods – foods with low pH levels – such as alcohol, caffeine, dairy, fungi, grains, meat, and sugar. Proponents believe such a diet may have health benefits; critics consider the arguments to have no scientific basis.
- Clean eating or the Macrobiotic diet
- Climatarian diet: A diet focused on reducing the carbon footprint of the consumed food, particularly through the consumption of locally sourced food and the avoidance of beef and lamb meat. Adherents may also be "organivores" (strong proponents of certified organic foods over intensively farmed foods).
- Eat-clean diet: Focuses on eating foods without preservatives, and on mixing lean proteins with complex carbohydrates.
- Gerson therapy: A form of alternative medicine, the diet is low salt, low fat and vegetarian, and also involves taking specific supplements. It was developed by Max Gerson, who claimed the therapy could cure cancer and chronic, degenerative diseases. These claims have not been scientifically proven, and they can cause serious illness and death.
- The Graham Diet: A high-fiber vegetarian diet that promotes whole-wheat flour and discourages the consumption of alcohol and caffeine. Promoted by Sylvester Graham beginning in 1830.
- Hay diet: A food-combining diet developed by William Howard Hay in the 1920s. Divides foods into separate groups, and suggests that proteins and carbohydrates should not be consumed in the same meal.
- High-protein diet: A diet in that high quantities of protein are consumed with the intention of building muscle. Not to be confused with low-carb diets, where the intention is to lose weight by restricting carbohydrates.
- High residue diet: A diet in which high quantities of dietary fiber are consumed. High-fiber foods include certain fruits, vegetables, nuts and grains.

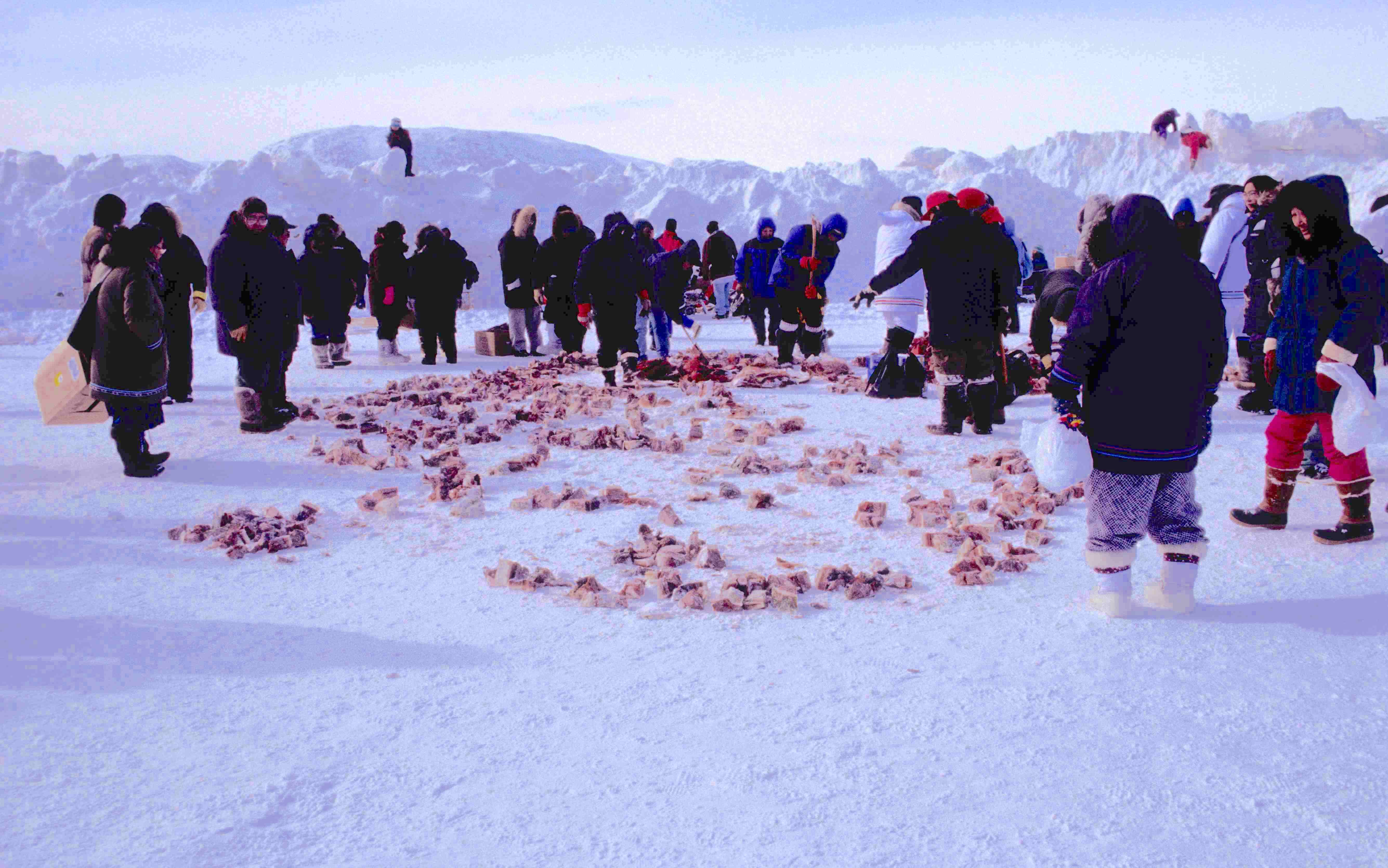
Sharing of frozen, aged walrus meat among Inuit families

- Inuit diet: Inuit traditionally consume food that is fished, hunted or gathered locally, predominantly meat and fish. This was promoted as a fad diet in 1928.
- Jenny Craig: A weight-loss program from Jenny Craig, Inc. It includes weight counselling among other elements. The dietary aspect involves the consumption of pre-packaged food produced by the company.
- Locavore diet: a neologism describing the eating of food that is locally produced, and not moved long distances to market. An example of this was explored in the book 100-Mile Diet, in which the authors only consumed food grown within 100 miles of their residence for a year. People who follow this type of diet are sometimes known as locavores.
- Low glycemic index diet
- Low-protein diet
- Low sodium diet
- Low-sulfur diet

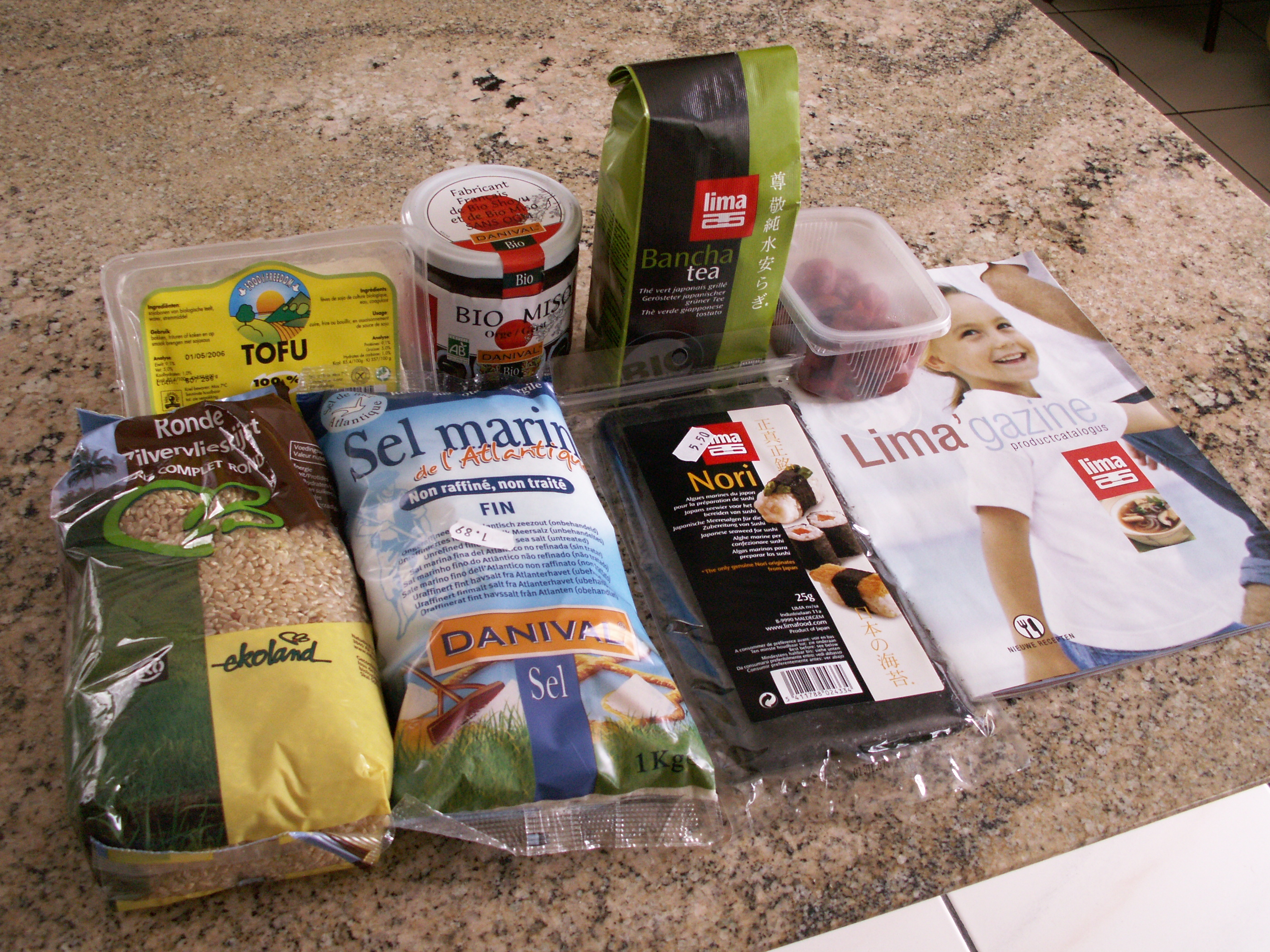
Some common macrobiotic ingredients

- Mediterranean diet: A diet based on habits of some southern European countries. One of the more distinct features is that olive oil is used as the primary source of fat.
- MIND diet: combines the portions of the DASH diet and the Mediterranean diet. The diet is intended to reduce neurological deterioration such as Alzheimer's disease.
- Montignac diet: A weight-loss diet characterised by consuming carbohydrates with a low glycemic index.
- Mushroom diet: A mushroom-predominant diet.
- Negative calorie diet: A claim by many weight-loss diets that some foods take more calories to digest than they provide, such as celery. The basis for this claim is disputed.
- Okinawa diet: A low-calorie diet based on the traditional eating habits of people from the Ryukyu Islands.
- Omnivorous diet: An omnivore consumes diverse range of both plant and animal-based food.
- Organic food diet: A diet consisting only of food that is organic – it has not been produced with modern inputs such as synthetic fertilizers, genetic modification, irradiation, antibiotics, growth hormones, or synthetic food additives.
- Prison loaf: A meal replacement served in some United States prisons to inmates who are not trusted to use cutlery. Its composition varies between institutions and states, but as a replacement for standard food, it is intended to provide inmates with all their dietary needs.
- Raw foodism: A diet that centres on the consumption of uncooked and unprocessed food. Often associated with a vegetarian diet, although some raw food dieters do consume raw meat. It was a fad in 2000.
- Shangri-La Diet
- Slimming World diet
- Slow-carb diet
- Smart For Life
- Sonoma diet: A diet based on portion control and centered around consuming "power foods"
- SparkPeople diet
- Sugar Busters!: A 1995 diet that focuses on restricting the consumption of refined carbohydrates, particularly sugars.
- Western pattern diet (WPD): 'Default' diet in many developed countries, especially the Anglosphere. The name is from "Western world" and is interchanged with "standard American diet" and "meat-sweet diet" due to the high amount of meat (total), red meats (particularly), dairy, sweets and refined cereals. Subpar intake of whole grains, legumes, tree nuts, produce and seafood is the norm. WPDs are distinguished from other unbalanced diets by heavy inclusion of 'junk food' and other ultra-processed foods that generally provide substantial empty calories, carbohydrates, saturated fat, industrial trans fat, added sugar/free sugars, added salt, artificial flavor/sweetener and other processing ingredients. Archetypal examples include: RTE cereals, white breads, fast food, other convenience meals, cured meat dishes, smoked/fried meats, fried dough foods, shallow/deep fried potatoes, other foods intensely fried in rendered fat/refined oil, sugary/fatty discretionary foods (e.g., sauce, candy), colas and other sweetened soft drinks.

== See also ==
- Academy of Nutrition and Dietetics
- Comparison of Islamic and Jewish dietary laws
- Dietitian
- British Dietetic Association
- Eating disorder
- Eatwell plate
- Food security
- Intuitive eating
- List of diet food creators
- Nutritional rating systems
- Online weight loss plans
- Vegetarianism and religion
- Veganism
