= Mushroom diet =

Fungi-based nutrition

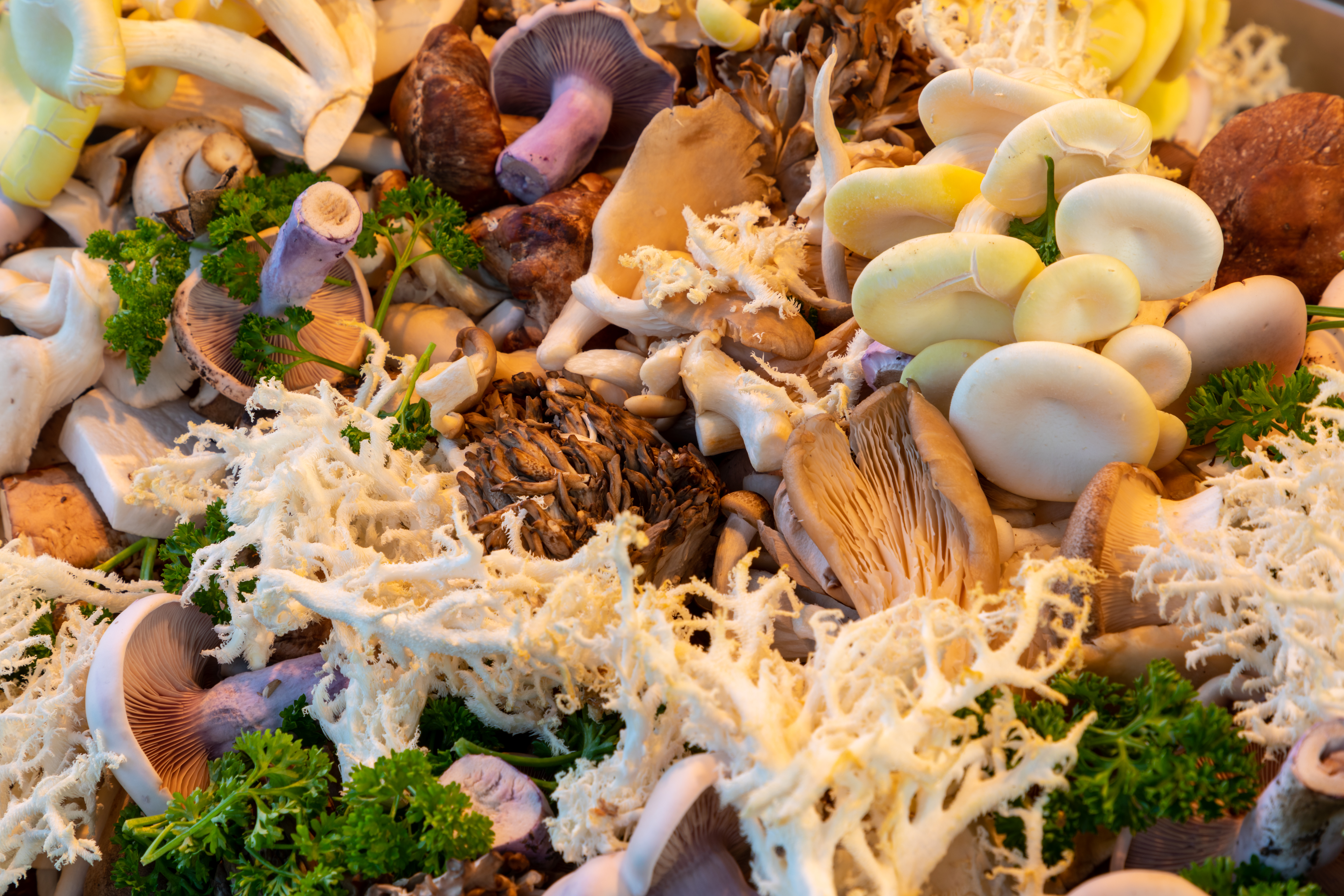
Assorted edible mushrooms for sale at a market

Mushroom diet is an umbrella term for diets with significant amounts of mushrooms.

== Description ==
A mushroom-only diet for humans is considered unrealistic due to insufficient calorie intake. The term mushroom diet can mean:

- Higher mushroom consumption
- Eating specific mushrooms on a regular basis
- Replacing all meat with mushrooms
- Replacing one meal a day with mushrooms for 2 weeks (a fad diet called M-plan diet)

== Health benefits ==
Higher mushroom consumption is associated with reduced breast cancer risk and reduction in mean blood pressure.

== Criticism ==
Dr. Joseph Schwarcz points out that many of the studies showing the health benefits of eating mushrooms have significant flaws. It is often not taken into account what other fruits or vegetables the subjects eat; some studies have been conducted only in Asia, where people have specific eating habits.

The mushroom diet of M-plan diet type has been criticized as a fad diet not based on scientific data; the results of following it will depend mainly on other foods.

== See also ==
- List of diets
- Kombucha
- Medicinal fungi
- Mono diet
- Edible mushroom
- Mushroom tea
- Mushroom hunting
- Mycophagy
