= Tongue Patch Diet =

Fad diet

Tongue Patch Diet (also known as The Weight Reduction Patch, Chugay Patch and Miracle Patch) is a fad diet that involves attaching a patch to the top of the tongue that makes eating painful in order to cause the person to avoid eating solid food. After being launched in 2009 by Nikolas Chugay, the diet was criticized by health experts and media outlets.

== History ==
Tongue Patch Diet was developed by Chugay, a plastic surgeon in Beverly Hills, in 2009. Chugay got the idea of the diet from a friend who was doing a similar procedure in Mexico. Chugay introduced the tongue patch diet as an alternative to invasive weight loss methods such as gastric bypass or Lapband surgery. In 2011, a similar procedure was introduced in Venezuela. However, the procedure gained more popularity in Venezuela as compared to the USA.

As of 2014, Chugay is the only surgeon in the USA who offers this treatment and it has not been approved by FDA.

== Procedure ==
In the Tongue Patch Diet, a patch is stitched to the tongue of the dieter to make the consumption of solid food painful. The patch is made of Marlex, a polymer composed of polypropylene and high-density polyethylene. The procedure for stitching the patch to the tongue takes about ten minutes.

Since consuming solid food is painful, the dieter has to resort to a restrictive 800-calorie liquid only diet developed by Chugay. The patch can be removed any time by snipping the sutures. However, it should be removed within a month or the tongue may start growing on the patch. Some patients have had the mesh in place up to 60 days without untoward effects. In the days subsequent to the procedure, the patient takes antibiotics for 3 days to minimize the risk of infection and washes with an antiseptic mouth wash to decrease the bacterial count.

According to Chugay, the diet can help a patient in reducing 30 pounds in one month. Chugay and his son Paul Chugay published a study in the American Journal of Cosmetic Surgery that said 70 percent of their patients lost an average of 16 pounds and kept it off for eight months.

After the patch has been applied, the 30-day regimen also includes 45 minutes of daily exercise, in addition to limiting caloric intake.

== Risks ==
Patients may have a swollen tongue or difficulty speaking for the first 72 hours after the procedure. Chugay claims that the diet has no severe risks or side effects.

Critics of the diet have labelled it as dangerous claiming that it could cause infection, swelling or nerve damage.

== In mass media ==
After being launched, the diet has received considerable media attention, with health experts criticizing the diet. Many media outlets have also reviewed the diet negatively with Good Magazine writing that "in essence it's nothing more than a modern version of wiring one's jaw shut, forcing the "patient" to literally starve themselves."

== See also ==
- List of diets
