= Rice diet =

Fad diet, radical treatment of malignant hypertension

The Rice Diet started as a radical treatment for malignant hypertension before the advent of drugs; the original diet included strict dietary restriction and hospitalization for monitoring. Some contemporary versions have been greatly relaxed, and have been described as fad diets.

== Origin and original form ==
The Rice Diet Program was founded in 1939 by Walter Kempner (1903-1997), a German physician and refugee from the Nazis, who was at that time associated with Duke University. Kempner had many patients with malignant hypertension with kidney failure, and there were no good treatments for those patients. He believed that the kidney had two functions, one excretory and the other metabolic, and "he theorized that if the protein and electrolyte load on the kidney was reduced to a minimum, the kidney might better perform its more essential metabolic role. The details of his reasoning are obscure, but he began to treat patients with malignant hypertension with a diet composed of nothing but rice and fruit, and amazingly, they rapidly improved."

Kempner's implementation was very strict, but also careful - patients were hospitalized for several weeks at the beginning of treatment. The initial treatment was stopping all medication and putting the patient on a diet consisting of "white rice, sugar, fruit, fruit juices, vitamin and iron, and provided about 2000 calories, 20 grams of protein, and 700–1000 ml of liquid as fruit juices. Sodium content was extremely low, about 150 milligrams per day, and chloride content about 200 milligrams per day." If results were good, after several months small amounts of lean meat and vegetables were added to the diet.

Kempner obtained remarkable results, and he was invited to present them at a meeting of the New York Academy of Medicine in 1946. His presentation survives and "presents clear and unambiguous evidence, including blood pressure charts, retinal photographs, chest radiographs, electrocardiograms and laboratory results, documenting the benefits of his diet." (Note: "In Kempner’s original cohort of 192 people, 25 patients died. Of the remaining 167, 60 patients did not substantially improve their blood pressure values. However, 107 patients showed significant improvement (from 200/112 mmHg to 149/96 mmHg) with the diet. Heart size decreased in 66 of 72 patients. Serum cholesterol was reduced in 73 of 82 patients. Retinopathy was reduced or disappeared completely in 21 of 33 patients. We must keep these results in context with the times, during which the life expectancy of anyone with malignant hypertension was 6 months.")

Kempner described his diet as "a monotonous and tasteless diet which would never become popular.... Kempner's only defense of its use was the fact that “it works,” and that the diet was preferable to the alternative of certain death"

== Controversy ==
Kempner admitted in statements before his death that he whipped patients who avoided his rice diet. In 1993, a former patient Sharon Ryan sued him. Ryan accused Kempner of keeping her as a "virtual sex slave" for nearly two decades. According to the lawsuit, Kempner "persuaded Ryan to drop out of college, moved her into a home he owned, hired her to work for the clinic, and maintained a sexual relationship with Ryan by isolating her from the outside world". The lawsuit ended with a confidential settlement. In 1997, the Raleigh News & Observer reported that, by 1975, Duke University Medical Center (now Duke University Hospital), knew that Kempner had used a riding crop on several patients and reprimanded him, though he continued to be associated with the university. None of these charges were proven in court. Dr Kempner denied the accusations of having a sexual relationship with this patient. "Dr Kempner had whipped this patient on several occasions, and had also whipped several other patients in an effort to motivate them. In all instances, the patients had either themselves suggested or had consented in advance to this punishment for breaking the diet" These events received a great deal of sensationalist media attention.

== Contemporary forms ==
Kempner retired from the Duke Faculty in 1974, but consulted until 1992. The commercialization of drugs to treat hypertension reduced both demand for the program and the need to make it strict in order to prevent death. In 2002 the program became independent of Duke University, and in 2013 the Rice House Healthcare Program opened in Durham, North Carolina. The Rice House Healthcare Program is an inpatient facility where people are put on a diet akin to the original diet and are monitored.

The rice diet has influenced some contemporary advocates of the plant-based diet. For example, physician John A. McDougall has commented regarding the research of Walter Kempner that "all who have followed in his footsteps, including Nathan Pritikin, Dean Ornish, Neal D. Barnard, Caldwell Esselstyn, and myself, owe homage to this man and his work."

The rice diet has been popularized in a modulated form through several modern books. Judy Moscovitz in her book The Rice Diet Report, allows fruit, vegetables and various carbohydrates. Kitty and Robert Rosati authors of The Rice Diet Solution describe their diet as a "low-sodium, good-carb, detox diet". It is based on the consumption of carbohydrates such as whole grains, fruits, vegetables, and beans.

== Criticism ==
The modern version of the rice diet has been categorized as a fad diet with possible disadvantages including boring food choices, flatulence, and the risk of feeling too hungry.

And while the diet never was intended to be a lifetime eating protocol, nutritionist Yvette Quantz has suggested that the rice diet has some good short-term benefits in the long term but does not provide "enough calories or protein for most people to sustain."
