= Sugar Busters! =

Diet

The New Sugar Busters! Cut Sugar to Trim Fat
- First edition
- Author: H. Leighton Steward, Sam S. Andrews, Morrison C. Bethea, and Luis A. Balart
- Subject: Dieting
- Publisher: Sugar Busters Llc
- Publication date: 1996
- Pages: 388
- ISBN: 978-0-345-46958-8
- OCLC: 34737173

The Sugar Busters diet is a diet focused on eliminating foods containing refined carbohydrates such as refined sugar, white flour, and white rice, as well as naturally occurring carbohydrates rating high on the glycemic index such as potatoes and carrots.

Sugar Busters was created by H. Leighton Steward, Sam S. Andrews, Morrison C. Bethea, and Luis A. Balart.

The diet is classified as a fad diet, and though its results compare with those of other low-calorie diets, it brings an increased risk of heart disease.

The original Sugar Busters! Cut Sugar to Trim Fat was self-published by the authors in 1995 and became a local hit in their hometown of New Orleans, after which Ballantine Books republished the book nationally. The Ballantine edition hit #1 on the New York Times bestseller list in June 2001. An updated The New Sugar Busters! Cut Sugar to Trim Fat was published in 2003.

== See also ==
- List of diets
