= Fred Pescatore =

American author and internist

- Occupations: Internist; Author
- Known for: Bestselling author

Fred Pescatore is a Manhattan-based author and internist who specializes in nutrition. He is best known as the author of the bestselling children's health book Feed Your Kids Well (1998) and The Hamptons Diet (2004).

Pescatore served as medical director of Dr. Robert Atkins’ Atkins Medical Center from 1994 to 1999. He opened his own medical practice, Partners in Integrative Medicine, in October 2003. Pecastore also serves as president of the International and American Associations of Clinical Nutrition.

== Hamptons Diet ==
Pescatore has developed and marketed a low-carbohydrate, low-calorie diet known as the Hamptons diet. The diet is described as a mixture of the Atkins diet and the Mediterranean diet.

Pescatore departed from the high level of saturated fat recommended in the Atkins diet. Instead, the Hamptons diet focuses on eating monounsaturated fats. The diet advocates the use of macadamia nut oil and lean meats such as chicken and fish. Foods high in saturated fat are allowed in moderation.

In 2008, The Gale Encyclopedia of Diets noted potential risks of the diet, "The Hamptons diet has been criticized by nutritionists for its inadequate allowances of fiber, vitamin C, calcium, folate, vitamin D, and vitamin E. The diet is also high in fat, which provides as much as 70% of the calories in some menu plans." Another criticism of the Hamptons diet is that the foods chosen for recipes are often expensive or hard to find. The recipes are also time-consuming and many require advance preparation. There is no scientific evidence that the Hamptons diet is effective as there have been no reports of clinical trials in mainstream research journals. It became a fad reported in celebrity and fashion magazines.

Clinical dietician Shweta Rastogi has listed the Hamptons diet as an example of a fad diet. Dietician Sue Baic has commented that "there is an unnecessary emphasis on cutting out carbohydrates and using very expensive foods which limits the application to most people".

== Selected publications ==
- Feed your kids well : how to help your child lose weight and get healthy (ISBN 9780471248552)
- Thin for good : the one low-carb diet that will finally work for you (ISBN 9780471362678)
- The allergy and asthma cure : a complete 8-step nutritional program (ISBN 9780471214687)
- The Hamptons diet : lose weight quickly and safely with the doctor's delicious meal plans (ISBN 9780471478126)
- Boost your health with bacteria (ISBN 9781935297215)
- AHCC : Japan's medical breakthrough in natural immunotherapy (ISBN 9781591202806)
