= Lamb chop and pineapple diet =

1920s fad diet

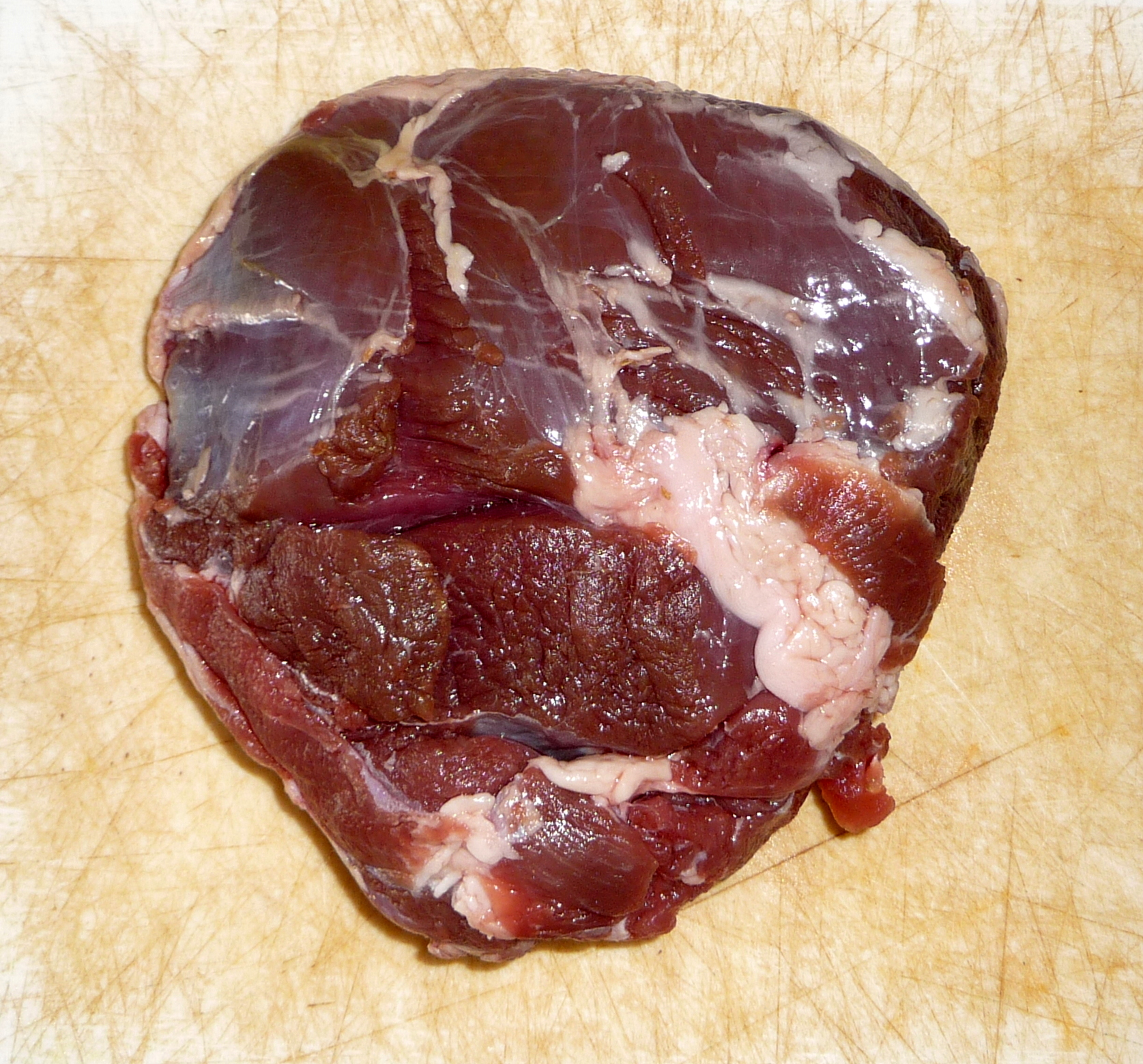
Lamb

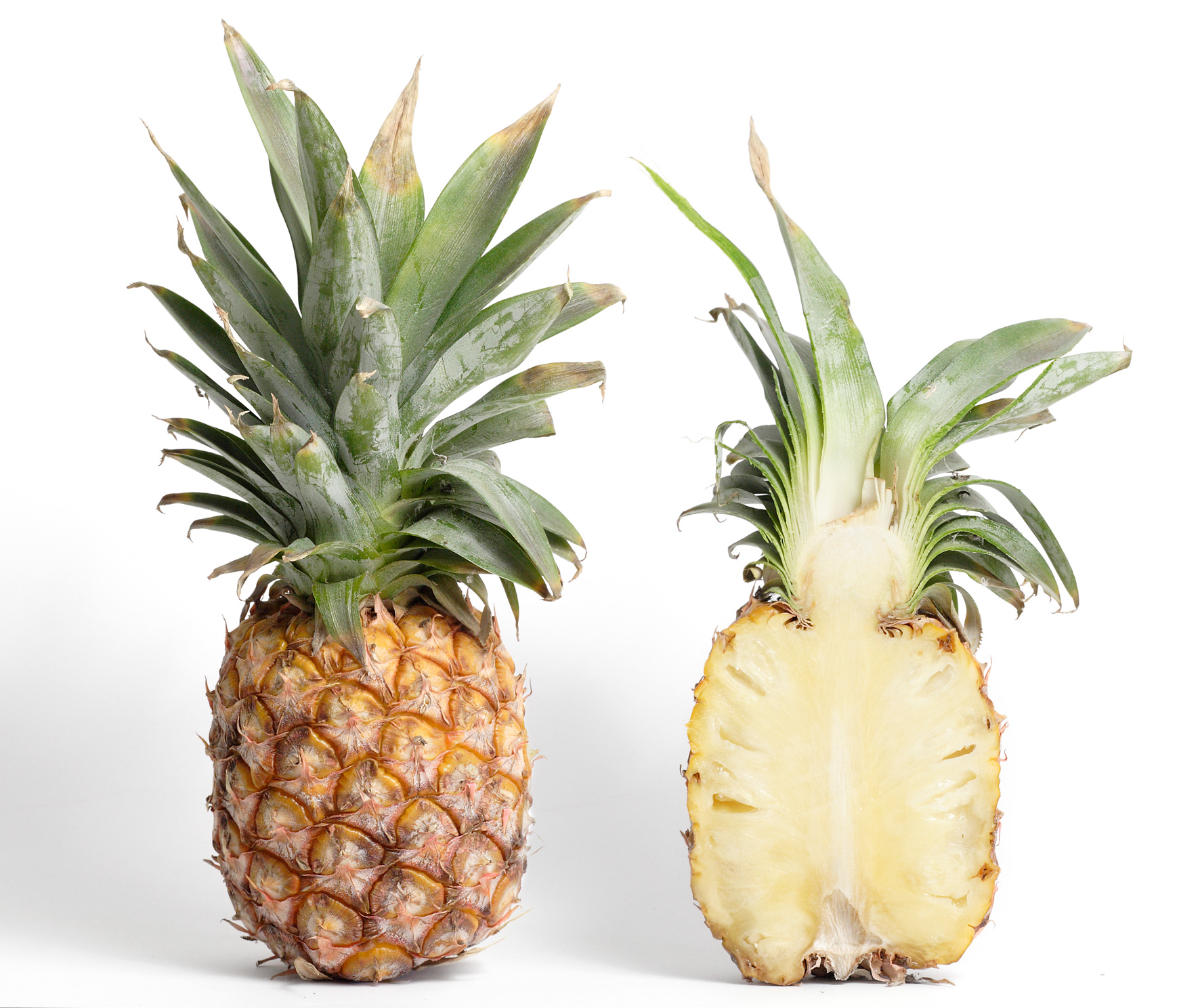
Pineapple fruit, whole and in cross section

The lamb chop and pineapple diet was an American high-protein fad diet that was popular in the 1920s.

The idea behind the diet was that lamb chops provide sufficient protein for strength, pineapples enough sugar for energy, while the fruit acid would absorb or destroy any leftover fat from the lamb chops. In 1924, it was adopted and promoted by Nita Naldi and other Hollywood celebrities. She claimed the diet made her lose twenty pounds. It was later reported that the diet made Naldi sick for weeks. She abandoned the diet after suffering from dizziness and hunger.

Like other imbalanced fad diets, it was advised against by nutritionists, as it failed to provide the essential nutrients that the body needs to function properly.
