= Low-sulfur diet =

Diet with reduced sulfur content

A low-sulfur diet is a diet with reduced sulfur content. Important dietary sources of sulfur and sulfur containing compounds may be classified as essential mineral (e.g. elemental sulfur), essential amino acid (methionine) and semi-essential amino acid (e.g. cysteine).

Sulfur is an essential dietary mineral primarily because amino acids contain it. Sulfur is thus considered fundamentally important to human health, and conditions such as nitrogen imbalance and protein-energy malnutrition may result from deficiency. Methionine cannot be synthesized by humans, and cysteine synthesis requires a steady supply of sulfur.

(S)-Methionine, an essential sulfur containing amino acid

The recommended daily allowance (RDA) of methionine (combined with cysteine) for adults is set at 13–14 mg kg-1 day-1 (13–14 mg per kg of body weight per day), but some researchers have argued that this figure is too low, and should more appropriately be 25 mg kg-1 day-1.

Despite the importance of sulfur, restrictions of dietary sulfur are sometimes recommended for certain diseases and for other reasons.

== Cystathionine beta-synthase deficiency ==
Cystathionine β-synthase (CBS) deficiency is a serious disorder of transsulfuration which is managed with methionine restricted dieting.

Food sources of Methionine
| Food | g/100g |
|---|---|
| Egg, white, dried, powder, glucose reduced | 3.204 |
| Sesame seeds flour (low fat) | 1.656 |
| Egg, whole, dried | 1.477 |
| Cheese, Parmesan, shredded | 1.114 |
| Brazil nuts | 1.008 |
| Soy protein concentrate | 0.814 |
| Chicken, broilers or fryers, roasted | 0.801 |
| Fish, tuna, light, canned in water, drained solids | 0.755 |
| Beef, cured, dried | 0.749 |
| Bacon | 0.593 |
| Beef, ground, 95% lean meat / 5% fat, raw | 0.565 |
| Pork, ground, 96% lean / 4% fat, raw | 0.564 |
| Wheat germ | 0.456 |
| Oat | 0.312 |
| Peanuts | 0.309 |
| Chickpea | 0.253 |
| Corn, yellow | 0.197 |
| Almonds | 0.151 |
| Beans, pinto, cooked | 0.117 |
| Lentils, cooked | 0.077 |
| Rice, brown, medium-grain, cooked | 0.052 |

== Agriculture ==
In the farming industry, environmental concerns over air pollution led to research aimed at reducing the odor of manure. A body of evidence emerged that increased sulfur containing amino acid content of feed increased the offensive odor of feces and flatus produced by livestock.

This is thought to be due to increased sulfur containing substrate available to gut microbiota enabling increased volatile sulfur compound (VSC) release during gut fermentation (VSC are thought to be the primary contributors to the odor of flatus and feces).

This theory is supported by the observation that feces from carnivores is more malodorous than feces from herbivore species, and this appears to apply to human diets as well (odor of human feces shown to increase with increased dietary protein, particularly sulfur containing amino acids).

== Sulfur content of food ==
Generally, a low sulfur diet involves reduction of meats, dairy products, eggs, onions, peas and cruciferous vegetables (cauliflower, cabbage, kale, watercress, broccoli and other leafy vegetables), .

== Amino Acids containing Sulfur ==
A diet low in sulfur may impact (directly or indirectly) the use and utilization of some amino acids.

Amino Acids Using Sulphur

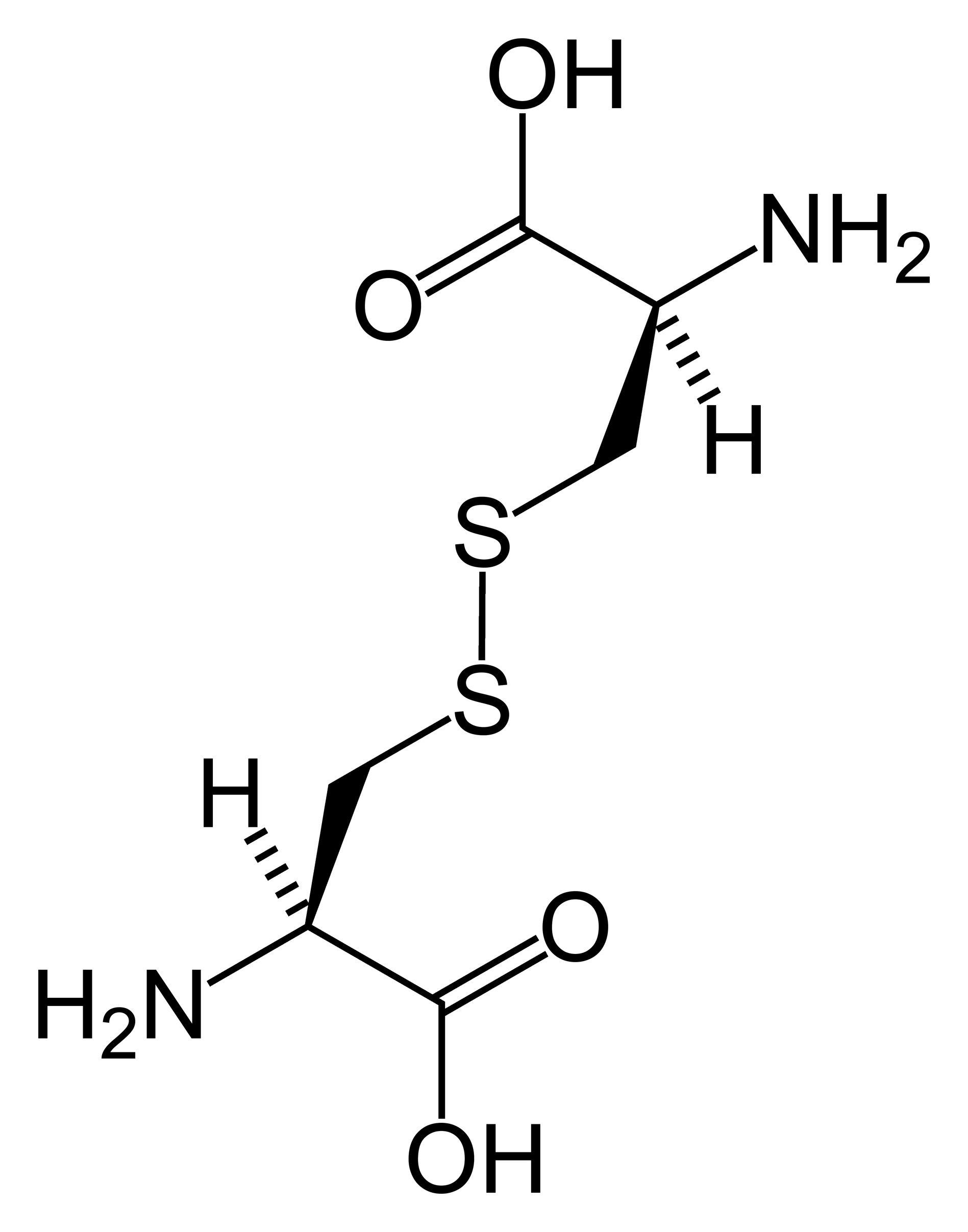
Cystine, a proteinogenic amino acid

Cystathionine

Djenkolic Acid

Lanthionine

Methionine, a proteinogenic amino acid

== See also ==
- List of diets
- Methionine
- Protein-energy malnutrition
