= Renal diet =

Diet for people with kidney problems

A renal diet is a diet aimed at keeping levels of fluids, electrolytes, and minerals balanced in the body in individuals with chronic kidney disease or who are on dialysis. Dietary changes may include the restriction of fluid intake, protein, and electrolytes including sodium, phosphorus, and potassium. Calories may also be supplemented if the individual is losing weight undesirably.

The diet may help limit the buildup of waste products within the body and reduce strain on the kidneys, as well as reduce blood pressure and lower the risk of fluid build-up around the heart and lungs. Phosphorus restriction can help maintain bone health, as phosphorus buildup in the blood results in the leaching of calcium from bones and subsequently an increased fracture risk. The evidence supporting uptake of a renal diet and a reduction in cardiovascular events and mortality is limited, but dietary interventions may increase health-related quality of life and estimated Glomerular Filtration Rate (eGFR) while lowering serum albumin and serum cholesterol levels.

The restrictiveness of a renal diet depends on the severity of the patient's kidney disease, and the diet should be undertaken with the advice of a dietician. Patients with comorbid conditions like diabetes may need to further alter their diets to meet the needs of those conditions simultaneously.

== Who should be on a renal diet? ==
Diet modification is recommended in those diagnosed with CKD stage 3-5 or GFR <60 mL/min/1.73^{2} that are NOT on dialysis. Those with eGFR greater than or equal to 60 mL/min/1.73^{2} are recommended to follow the general population dietary recommendations (DASH diet).

== Sodium ==
Sodium restriction in CKD has been studied and recommended in individuals w/ coexisting hypertension, volume overload or proteinuria. Sodium restriction to <2 g/day (<5 g/day of salt) has shown improved blood pressure control, improved volume control and reduced proteinuria. High sodium intake of above 6g/day has been shown to increase rates of cardiovascular disease, stroke and overall mortality.

Avoid: High-sodium foods
- Brined or pickled foods
- Condiments
- Canned vegetables/meats/fish/soups
- Cured or smoked bacon, sausage, meats
- Deli meats
- Frozen dinners
- Pickles
- Pizza
- Processed/packaged foods
- Some seasonings
- Tomato sauces/marinades

Guide to reading sodium nutrition labels
Salt/sodium-free	Less than 5 mg of sodium per serving
Very low sodium	35 mg or less of sodium per serving
Low sodium	140 mg or less of sodium per serving
Reduced sodium	At least 25% less sodium than the regular product
Light or lite in sodium	At least 50% less sodium than the regular product
No salt added or unsalted	No salt is added during processing, but these products may not be salt/sodium-free unless stated

== Potassium ==
Potassium management for individuals with CKD is variable and dependent on various factors including CKD stage/eGFR, serum potassium levels and concomitant use of potassium altering medications such as ACE inhibitors/ARBs. Potassium regulation requires an individualized approach with the assistance of a dietician and physician.

Avoid: High-potassium food
Fruits	Vegetables	Proteins	Dairy	Other
Avocados Bananas Cantaloupe Coconut Figs Kiwi Mangos Nectarines Oranges Prunes Raisins	Artichokes Baked beans Beets Brussels sprouts Chard Olives Potatoes Pickles Pumpkin Squash: acorn, butternut Tomato	Beans (black, kidney, pinto) Lentils Lobster Salmon Sardines Scallops Whitefish	Cheese Ice cream Milk Yogurt	Chocolate Peanuts Peanut butter Potassium chloride salt substitute Sports drinks

Low-potassium foods
Fruits	Vegetables	Proteins	Grain	Fluids	Snacks
Apples Blueberries Cherries Dried fruits: apples, blueberries, cherries, coconut, cranberries Grapes Lychee Pears Persimmon Pineapple Plums Raspberries Strawberries Tangerines Watermelon	Asparagus Bean sprouts Broccoli Cabbage Carrots Cauliflower Celery Corn Cucumber Eggplant Green or wax beans Greens: collard, mustard, turnip Jicama Kale Leeks Lettuce Mushrooms Okra Onion Peas: green, sugar snap, snow Peppers: green, red, yellow, jalapeño Radish Spinach (raw) Squash: spaghetti, yellow, zucchini Turnips Water chestnuts	Beans Beef Chicken Edamame Eggs (whole or egg whites) Fish Lamb Lentils Pork Tofu Turkey Veal Wild game	Bagel Bread loaf Cereal Corn tortilla Couscous English muffins Oatmeal Pasta Pita Quinoa Rice Rice cakes Cream of Wheat Grits	100% fruit juices: apple, cranberry, grape, pineapple Fresh-brewed coffee Fresh-brewed tea: black, herbal Fresh-squeezed lemonade Nectars: apricot, guava, mango, papaya, peach, pear Sodas: club, lemon-lime Water: sparkling, tap	All-natural fruit leather Animal crackers Applesauce Frozen fruit bars Fruit cocktail Homemade desserts: fruit pie or cobbler Italian ice Rice Krispies Treats® Sherbet Unsalted snacks: crackers, pita chips, popcorn, pretzels, tortilla chips

== Phosphorus and calcium ==
Increased serum phosphate levels in CKD is associated with poor bone health, increased risk of cardiovascular events and mortality. Although there isn't enough evidence that dietary restriction of phosphorus leads to decreased serum phosphorus, KDOQI recommends a maximum of 0.8 to 1 g/day intake restriction of dietary phosphorus.

Serum phosphate levels in CKD are heavily influenced by calcium and parathyroid hormone levels. In CKD, the kidneys are unable to make adequate amounts of vitamin D, resulting in decreased calcium absorption. Low calcium leads to parathyroid hormone release, which moves calcium and phosphorus out of bones and into the blood. Therefore calcium supplementation in CKD patients results in decreased PTH and decreased phosphorus levels. KDOQI recommends a calcium intake goal of 800 to 1000 mg/day (diet and medications combined). Excessive calcium supplementation of 2000 mg/day for CKD patients may result in calcium deposition in other tissues leading to calcification.

Avoid: High-phosphorus foods
Protein	Grains	Dairy	Fluids	Other
Pre-packaged or breaded meats and fish Hot dogs Sausage Processed meats	Biscuits Granola Muffins Corn bread Pancakes Waffles	Cheese Cheese sauces Ice cream Milk Pudding Yogurt	Beer Hot cocoa Canned soup Some carbonated beverages, flavored waters and teas Milk Milkshakes Some protein shakes	Baking powder Caramels Chocolate Nut butters Nuts Pizza Seeds (caraway, pumpkin, sesame, sunflower)

Low-phosphorus foods
Protein	Grains	Dairy	Fruits
Fresh meats without breading or marinades Turkey breast/thigh, skinless Chicken breast/thigh skinless Pork chop/roast Salmon Sea bass Shrimp Yellowfin	Flour tortillas: without baking powder White pita bread White bread Sourdough bread	Almond milk Sour cream Soy milk Egg whites Cream cheese	Apple Cherries Peaches Pineapple Strawberries

== Protein ==
A low protein diet for individuals with non-dialysis CKD has shown to lower the rate of CKD progression and electrolyte balance. Low protein diets of <0.8 g/kg/day have shown improved CKD management with reduced serum phosphorus, serum urea nitrogen and reduced protein in the urine. A very low protein diet (0.28 g/kg/day) is not recommended due to the possibility of malnutrition. The National Kidney Foundation's Kidney Disease Outcomes Quality Initiative (KDOQI) recommends a low protein diet of 0.55-0.6 g/kg/day but specific levels of protein intake varies for each individual and should be altered with the advice of a dietician and/or physician.

== See also ==
- List of diets
