= Stanley Burroughs =

American writer (1903–1991)

- Born: October 9, 1903; New York, United States
- Died: June 16, 1991 (aged 87); Newcastle, California, United States
- Occupations: Author, dietician

Stanley A. Burroughs (October 9, 1903 – June 16, 1991) was an American naturopath and promoter of pseudomedicine known for inventing the Master Cleanse or "lemonade" diet, which he published in his book The Master Cleanser.

His later book Healing for The Age of Enlightenment (1976) promoted pressure points and chromotherapy, in addition to his dietary theories. Burroughs faced legal challenges throughout his career, being twice convicted of practicing medicine without a license, and charged with second-degree murder following the death of a patient; his conviction on the murder charge was overturned on appeal.

== Early life ==
Burroughs was born in New York and raised in Detroit, Michigan. In the 1930s he migrated from the mid-west and settled in Portland, Oregon. He married and had three daughters; later he divorced, remarried, moved to California and saw little of his earlier family. He claimed to have worked at some point as a circus contortionist, resulting in an ankle injury that left him with an enduring limp. Although his original interest was in the lumber industry, he was inspired to explore alternative health theories. During his career, he lived in Oregon, Hawaii, and California.

== Pseudomedical practices ==
=== Master Cleanse diet, light therapy, and other claims ===
Burroughs became famous as the creator of the "Master Cleanse" diet, one of numerous alternative health practices he promoted. He developed a modified juice fast diet called the "Master Cleanse" that permits no food, substituting tea and lemonade made with maple syrup and cayenne pepper. He initially marketed it in the 1940s, and revived it in his 1976 book The Master Cleanser. Burroughs was also an advocate of colored light therapy and of deep massage, as well as a practitioner of deep reflexology. He was a strict vegetarian. He was also a committed nudist. He began his alternative health practices in the Portland area in the 1940s by conducting lectures and practicing reflexology on regular clients. Burroughs claimed to be able to cure all manner of diseases, including cancer, ulcers, and the common cold through his alternative medicine techniques. In one example, he claimed to have cured a woman of breast cancer by using colored lights to draw the cancer out of the woman. He also provided courses to teach his techniques, claiming at one point that "it takes you 10 years to learn medicine, I can teach you my system in 10 days".

=== Controversies and legal problems ===
At several points in his career, he had legal troubles related to his alternative health practices. In 1960 Burroughs was convicted of practicing medicine without a license. The same year, he was the subject of an injunction proceeding by the Food and Drug Administration against his sales of colored lights and plastic slides accompanied by literature making "false and misleading representations" about the health effects of using those lights. By the 1970s, Burroughs had been portrayed in the media as a controversial figure. A 1971 report in the Honolulu Star-Bulletin noted that he had come to Hawaii from Portland, Oregon, where he had been "in all kinds of trouble with government and medical authorities", which Burroughs attributed to a desire by the medical providers to suppress his ability to cure diseases that they could not.

In 1980, Burroughs moved from Hawaii to the San Francisco Bay Area of California. There, Burroughs was charged in the death of Lee Swatsenburg, a cancer patient under his treatment, whom Burroughs had treated with colored lights and massage. In 1981, Burroughs was convicted of second-degree murder in the case (later overturned on appeal) and practicing medicine without a license.

At his criminal trial in California, Burroughs was convicted of second-degree felony murder, felony practicing medicine without a license, and unlawful sale of cancer treatments. The felony murder charge stemmed from the jury's finding that the patient's death was a homicide committed by Burroughs while he was engaged in the felonious unlicensed practice of medicine. The Supreme Court of California, in reviewing the conviction on appeal, described the facts surrounding the treatment as follows:

During the first meeting between Lee [Swatsenbarg] and defendant [Burroughs], the latter described his method of curing cancer. This method included consumption of a unique "lemonade," exposure to colored lights, and a brand of vigorous massage administered by defendant. Defendant remarked that he had successfully treated "thousands" of people, including a number of physicians. He suggested the Swatsenbargs purchase a copy of his book, Healing for the Age of Enlightenment. If after reading the book Lee wished to begin defendant's unorthodox treatment, defendant would commence caring for Lee immediately. During the 30 days designated for the treatment, Lee would have to avoid contact with his physician.

Lee read the book, submitted to the conditions delineated by defendant, and placed himself under defendant's care. Defendant instructed Lee to drink the lemonade, salt water, and herb tea, but consume nothing more for the ensuing 30 days. At defendant's behest, the Swatsenbargs bought a lamp equipped with some colored plastic sheets, to bathe Lee in various tints of light. Defendant also agreed to massage Lee from time to time, for an additional fee per session.

Rather than improve, within two weeks Lee's condition began rapidly to deteriorate. He developed a fever, and was growing progressively weaker. Defendant counseled Lee that all was proceeding according to plan, and convinced the young man to postpone a bone marrow test urged by his doctor.

During the next week Lee became increasingly ill. He was experiencing severe pain in several areas, including his abdomen, and vomiting frequently. Defendant administered "deep" abdominal massages on two successive days, each time telling Lee he would soon recuperate.

Lee did not recover as defendant expected, however, and the patient began to suffer from convulsions and excruciating pain. He vomited with increasing frequency. Despite defendant's constant attempts at reassurance, the Swatsenbargs began to panic when Lee convulsed for a third time after the latest abdominal massage. Three and a half weeks into the treatment, the couple spent the night at defendant's house, where Lee died of a massive hemorrhage of the mesentery in the abdomen. The evidence presented at trial strongly suggested the hemorrhage was the direct result of the massages performed by defendant.

Burroughs was sentenced to fifteen years in prison, and served thirty-nine months of that sentence while his appeals were pending. The second-degree murder conviction was reversed by the California Supreme Court in 1984. The court, in an opinion by Justice Joseph Grodin, held that the felony murder jury instruction provided by the trial court was erroneous because felony practicing medicine without a license was not inherently dangerous to human life and could not serve as the predicate offense on which to base liability for felony murder. The court affirmed the other convictions and believed that Burroughs was "susceptible to a charge and possible conviction of involuntary manslaughter". An involuntary manslaughter charge was thereafter filed against Burroughs in the case, but was dropped by the district attorney in December of that year, on the grounds that an additional conviction would not impose more jail time on Burroughs than he had already served.

In 1987, Burroughs was again charged with practicing medicine without a license in California for attempting to sell the same therapies to an undercover state agent.

== Personal life, later years and death, and legacy ==
Burroughs was married to Louise, who stood by him during his legal troubles.

He died in Newcastle, California, on June 16, 1991, at the age of 87, after a two-week battle against acute pneumonia. His death certificate also mentions leg fractures, apparently from a fall, and a urinary infection as contributing conditions to his death. No autopsy was performed.

After Burroughs' death, his "lemonade diet", was examined and found to be ineffective and potentially harmful.
