= Cotton pad =

Pads of cotton used for sanitary applications

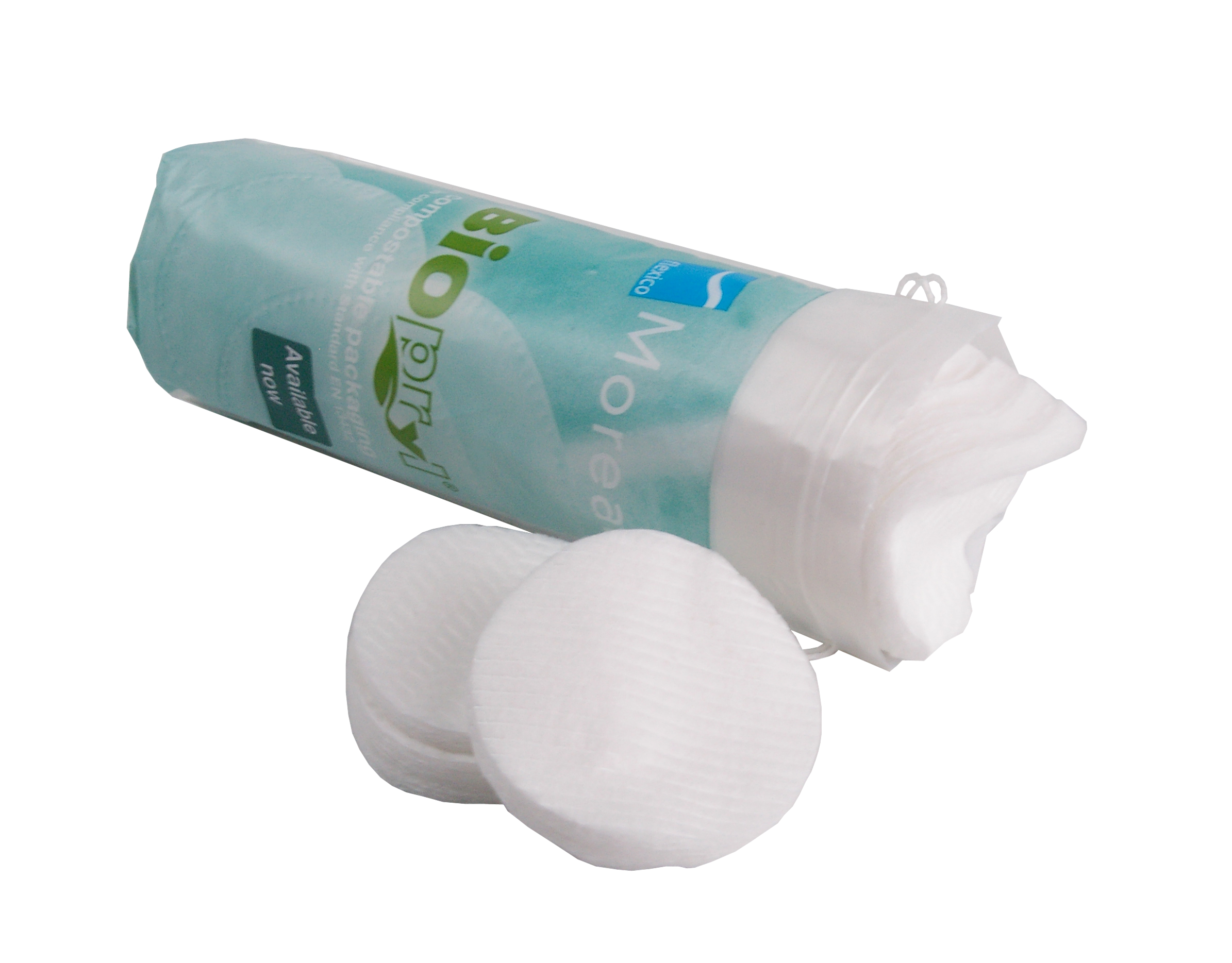
Cotton pads

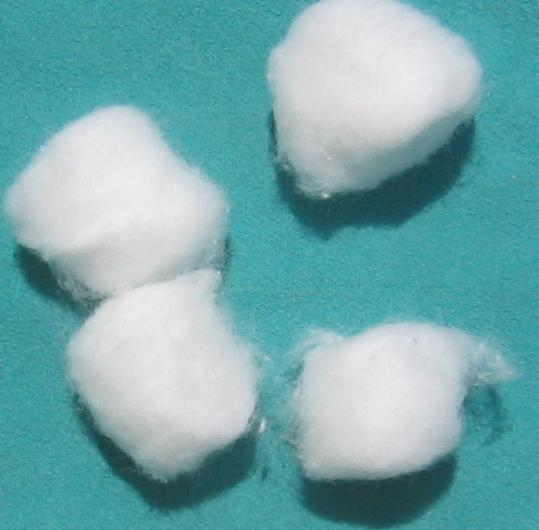
Cotton balls

Cotton pads are pads made of cotton which are used for medical or cosmetic purposes. For medical purposes, cotton pads are used to stop or prevent bleeding from minor punctures such as injections or venipuncture. They may be secured in place with tape. Cotton pads are also used in the application and the removal of makeup. Cotton pads are soft enough that they can be used to clean babies. Cotton balls have much of the same applications as cotton pads, and can be used interchangeably.

== History ==
Use of cotton for sanitary purposes likely dates back to its domestication. There is evidence that toilet paper, made in part of cotton and/or other plant fibers such as hemp, was used at least as early as 589 AD in China. (Note: See also: Toilet paper § History) Cotton balls have been used for applying gold leaf since at least as far back as 1801. An artists' manual from that year recommends using a "squirrel's tail, or cotton ball" to press the gold leaf into place. There is some evidence that they were being mass produced as far back as 1816, namely an advertisement taken out of the New York Evening Post by Palmer, Nichols & Co. for many different kinds of fabric and products made of cotton which lists "Cotton Balls" as an item for sale. In 1891 The Laredo Times ran a story about women who put cotton balls in their cheeks to make themselves appear less thin. An 1898 patent by Jerome B. Dillon for a new type of umbilical bandage used an "antiseptic, absorbent cotton pad" to carry out its function.

In 1937, Joseph A. Voss invented a machine which unraveled rolls of cotton and cut them at a fixed interval into cotton pads, starting the widespread consumption of cotton balls and pads. Companies producing cotton balls took out ads in newspapers as early as 1948 to promote their uses to the public. In 1965, the Opelousas Daily World reported that the sanitary cotton industry in the United States was worth US$60 million (US$460.4 million in 2016 CPI-adjusted dollars). Around this time, there was industry concern that sanitary products using nylon, labeled as cotton balls, were going to crowd out cotton balls actually containing cotton, harming cotton-exporting regions. In 1986, Johnson & Johnson, a manufacturer of cotton balls, published advertisements stating that "doctors advise" cotton balls over "synthetic puffs".

In 2015, Mass Market Retailers, a supermarket and chain store trade magazine, estimated that combined sales of cotton balls and pads in the United States were US$177.7 million for the year 2014, down from US$343.1 million in 1999. The change could be due to increases of sales of cheaper store brands: in 1999, only 50.1% of sold cotton balls were store branded, versus 83.7% in 2016. The top three cotton ball brands in the United States in 2016 were Swisspers (manufactured by U.S. Cotton), Swiss Beauty (U.S. Cotton), and Cotton Cloud (Wabbit, Inc.).

== See also ==
- Cotton ball diet
- Cotton swab
