= Werewolf diet =

Fad diet tied to the lunar phases

The werewolf diet, also known as the lunar diet and the moon diet, is a fad diet that centers upon users fasting according to the lunar phases. This has prompted people to nickname the diet plan the "werewolf diet" as a result. Celebrities that have endorsed the diet include Demi Moore and Madonna.

The diet is typically performed in one of two fashions: the "basic moon plan" or the "extended version". The first plan is a variation of the juice cleanse in that individuals are only permitted to drink water and freshly squeezed fruit or vegetable juice. This is typically performed in a 24-hour period during either the full or new moon. The extended version requires the diet to begin with the initial fast during the full moon and then follow a series of eating plans tailored to the various moon phases, such as not eating after 6 p.m. or eating less than normal.

== Criticism ==
The werewolf diet has received some criticism due to its similarity to detox diets as a whole, with some physicians dismissing the diet as a fad diet. Criticisms include the diet's effectiveness in the long term, that it hasn't been scientifically proven, and that the weight loss could be attributed more to the low calorie intake as opposed to lunar shifts. Others have raised concerns over claims that individuals can lose six pounds in one day, as some nutritionists have said that there is "no solid evidence that anyone can lose six pounds in a day." They also questioned the diet's long term health risks. A member of the Women's Health advisory board commented that, while the moon had a limited effect on the human body, "the effect isn't so great that you should actually rethink the way you eat during different times of the month" and that "fasting isn't the smartest idea—it can set you up for binges—and the Werewolf Diet's claims that you can lose up to six pounds in a day simply aren't realistic".
