= Master Cleanse =

Fad diet

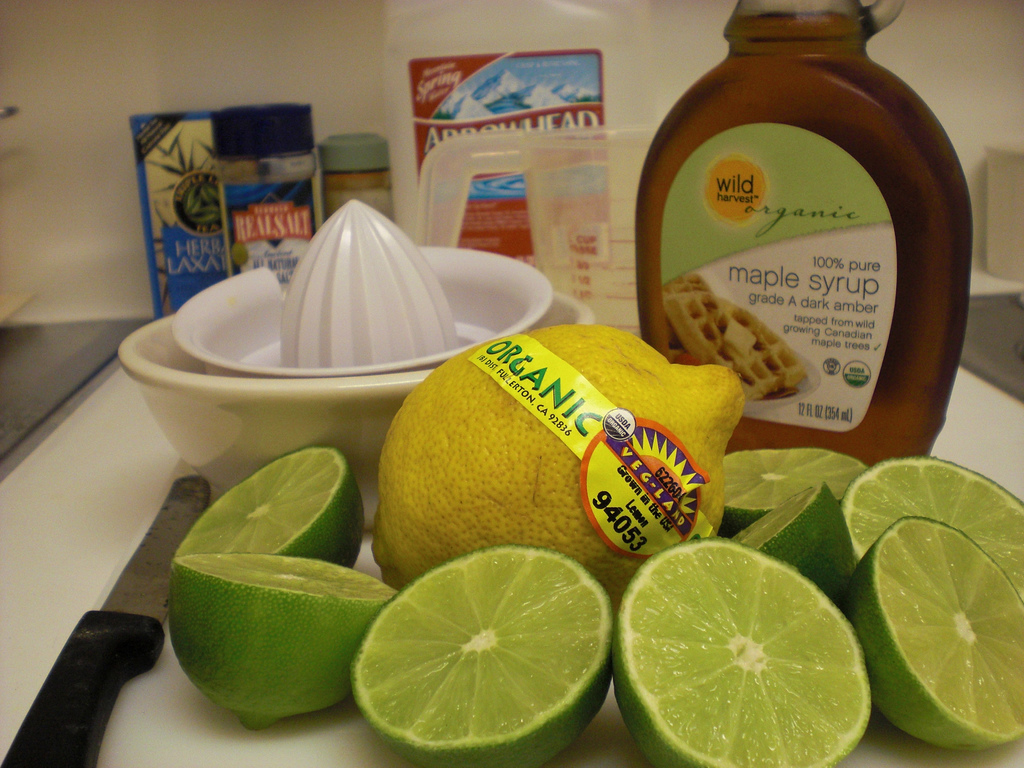
Master Cleanse ingredients

Master Cleanse (also called the lemonade diet or lemon detox diet) is a modified juice fast that permits no food, substituting tea and lemonade made with maple syrup and cayenne pepper as well as doing a one quarter saltwater flush using sea salt and water to cause urgent bowel movements each morning of the fast.

The diet was developed by Stanley Burroughs, who initially marketed it in the 1940s, and revived it in his 1976 book The Master Cleanser. Proponents claim that the diet tones, reduces and cleanses the body, allowing the body to heal itself. There is no evidence that the diet removes any toxins or that it achieves anything beyond temporary weight loss, followed by rapidly regaining the lost weight.

Though unlikely to be harmful over the short term, Master Cleanse and similar programs can be harmful over the long term. The diet lacks protein, fatty acids, and other essential nutrients and depends entirely on carbohydrates for calories. The daily laxative regimen can cause electrolyte imbalances and disrupt the normal gastrointestinal microbiome. In the longer run, staying on the Master Cleanse diet could result in severe metabolic acidosis, which can lead to coma or death. The Master Cleanse diet is considered a fad diet by nutritionists.

Nutritionist Jane Clark points to a lack of essential nutrients in this program, citing a deficiency of protein, vitamins, and minerals. As a result of these deficiencies, including far fewer calories than the recommended amount for health and optimum functioning, individuals on the diet may experience headaches and a variety of other symptoms in the short term and the diet is potentially harmful over the long term.

While the Master Cleanse diet can result in short-term weight loss, unless lasting changes are incorporated into one's diet after the regimen, the weight lost during the fast will be regained once the diet is stopped. Dietician Keri Glassman has said those following the diet are "guaranteed" to gain weight after stopping.

There was popular interest in the Master Cleanse diet when American singer Beyoncé promoted it on The Oprah Winfrey Show in 2006.

== See also ==
- Detoxification (alternative medicine)
- List of diets
- Pseudoscience
