= Cabbage soup diet =

Weight loss diet

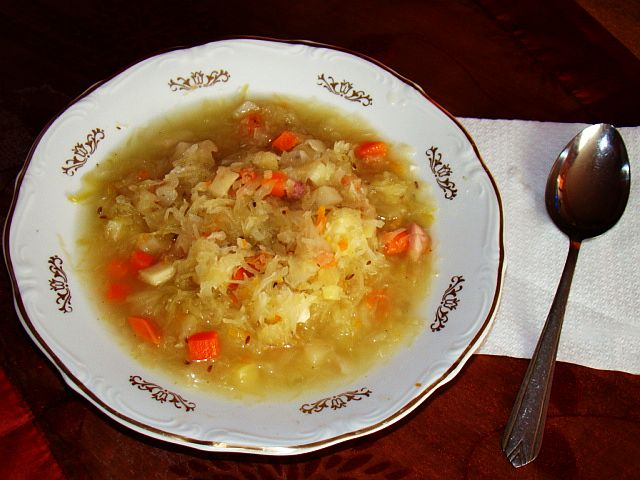
Cabbage soup

The cabbage soup diet is a radical weight loss diet designed around heavy consumption of a low-calorie cabbage soup over seven days. It is generally considered a fad diet, in that it is designed for short-term weight-loss and requires no long-term commitment.

The typical claimed intent of the diet is to lose 10 pounds (4.5 kg) of weight in a week, although nutritional experts point out that it is almost impossible to lose such a large amount of body fat within a week, much of the weight lost actually being accounted for by water.

== Background ==
The origins of the diet are unknown, but the diet dates back to the 1950s.

It gained popularity as a piece of faxlore in the 1980s. The cabbage soup diet has many names, usually linking the diet to a mainstream institution, including the "Sacred Heart Diet", "Military Cabbage Soup", "TJ Miracle Soup Diet", and "Russian Peasant Diet". All of the institutions named have denied a link with the diet. As a general rule, most if not all forms of the diet emphasize that the dieter can consume as much cabbage soup as they want.

== Criticism ==
Many individuals and medical professionals are critical of the diet. Most of the weight lost is water and not fat, and therefore not permanent. The amount of calories per day while on the diet is far lower than what is considered safe for long-term consumption.

Side effects of the diet can include dehydration, headaches, dizziness, nausea, fatigue, gas, bloating, muscle loss, brain fog and nutrient deficiencies.

== See also ==
- List of diets
