= Blood type diet =

Fad diet based on blood type

The blood type diets are fad diets advocated by several authors, the most prominent of whom is Peter J. D’Adamo (* 1956). These diets are based on the notion that blood type, according to the ABO blood group system, is the most important factor in determining a healthy diet, and each author recommends a distinct diet for each blood type.

The consensus among dietitians, physicians, and scientists is that these diets are unsupported by scientific evidence. In what was apparently the first study testing whether there was any benefit to eating the "right" diet according to one's blood type, a study published in 2014 compared "biomarkers" such as body mass index, blood pressure, and serum cholesterol and insulin among young people, and assessed their diets over a period of a month. Based on one's diet each person was classified as tending to follow the blood-type diet recommended for O, A, or B. While there were significant differences in some biomarkers between these groups, there was no significant interaction between diet and biomarkers. In other words, those who were eating the "right" diet for their blood type did not show different biomarker values on average compared to those eating the "wrong" diet.

The blood type diet was named by the British Dietetic Association as one of the "Top 5 Celeb Diets to Avoid in 2019".

== Diet ==
The underlying hypothesis of blood type diets is that people with different blood types digest lectins differently, and that if people eat food that is not compatible with their blood type, they will experience many health problems. On the other hand, if a person eats food that is compatible, they will be healthier.

That hypothesis is, in turn, based on an assumption that each blood type represents a different evolutionary heritage. "Based on the 'Blood-Type' diet theory, group O is considered the ancestral blood group in humans so their optimal diet should resemble the high animal protein diets typical of the hunter-gatherer era. In contrast, those with group A should thrive on a vegetarian diet as this blood group was believed to have evolved when humans settled down into agrarian societies. Following the same rationale, individuals with blood group B are considered to benefit from consumption of dairy products because this blood group was believed to originate in nomadic tribes. Finally, individuals with an AB blood group are believed to benefit from a diet that is intermediate to those proposed for group A and group B."

== Lack of evidence blood type diet improves health ==
As of 2017 there is no scientific evidence to support the blood type diet hypothesis and no clinical evidence that it improves health. Peter J. D'Adamo, a naturopath, is the most prominent proponent of blood type diets.

== Lack of evidence group O is the ancestral blood ==
Luiz C. de Mattos and Haroldo W. Moreira point out that assertions made by proponents of blood type diets that the O blood type was the first human blood type requires that the O gene have evolved before the A and B genes in the ABO locus; phylogenetic networks of human and non-human ABO alleles show that the A gene was the first to evolve. They argue that it would be extraordinary, from the perspective of evolution, for normal genes (those for types A and B) to have evolved from abnormal genes (for type O).

Yamamoto et al. further note: "Although the O blood type is common in all populations around the world, there is no evidence that the O gene represents the ancestral gene at the ABO locus. Nor is it reasonable to suppose that a defective gene would arise spontaneously and then evolve into normal genes.

== See also ==
- Blood type
- Blood type personality theory
- List of diets
