= Cookie diet =

Fad diet

A cookie diet is a calorie restricted fad diet designed to produce weight loss, based on meal replacement in the form of a specially formulated cookie.

In 1975, while researching a book on the effect of natural food substances on hunger, South Florida physician Sanford Siegal developed a mixture of certain amino acids and baked them into a cookie intended to control his patients' hunger. He instructed his patients to consume six cookies (approximately 500 calories) during the day to control hunger, and a dinner of approximately 300 calories in the evening.

From 2002 to mid-2006, Siegal licensed U.S. Medical Care Holdings LLC to open franchised weight loss centers. The company opened centers in the United States and Canada under various names including Siegal Smart for Life Weight Management Centers. The relationship between Siegal and his former franchise ended in August 2006. Siegal no longer supplies his products or licenses his name and weight loss system to USMCH. On September 25, 2008, USMCH filed for Chapter 11 bankruptcy protection.

Cookie diets include the Smart for Life Cookie Diet, Dr. Siegal’s Cookie Diet, Hollywood Cookie Diet and R&D Diet Cookie. All require 4 to 6 cookies per day, sometimes in addition to other food, such as one meal of six ounces of meat in the case of the Siegal diet.

== Criticism ==
The cookie diet has been labelled a fad diet. The diet is unbalanced and its requirement of 800 calories a day has been described as too low.
