= SparkPeople =

Former healthy-living website and apps

SparkPeople, Inc.
- Type: Private
- Industry: Internet, Health, Weight loss
- Founded: Cincinnati, Ohio, U.S. (2000)
- Founder: Chris Downie
- Headquarters: Cincinnati, Ohio, U.S.
- Website: www.SparkPeople.com

SparkPeople was an American private company which developed and maintained several healthy living websites and mobile apps.

SparkPeople operated sparkpeople.com, which offered a free four-stage diet program which used tools, content, and support to help users make lifestyle changes, and sparkRecipes.com, which allowed users the ability to catalog, rate, and share recipes, especially healthy recipes, and gave users the nutritional information about their recipes. It also offered the ability to add these recipes to their daily food log on SparkPeople.

On August 17, 2021, SparkPeople permanently closed all their current websites and apps. The reason given was decreased viability of ad supported platforms and increased competition from big companies.

== Reception ==
In January 2013, Consumer Reports assessed nine DIY diet plans and ranked SparkPeople 4th, behind MyFitnessPal, the Paleo diet, and the Mediterranean diet.

SparkPeople.com announced on February 15, 2012, that during January 2012 that there were 10 million visitors to the website, making it the most visited fitness and weight loss site on the internet. SparkPeople.com was named the winner of BusinessWeek's Best of The Web : Health in 2006, 2007, and 2008. In January 2007, SparkPeople.com was ranked by Hitwise as the 6th most visited site in the "Health and Medical - Wellbeing" category (and 3rd among diet sites).

On August 17, 2021, SparkPeople permanently closed all their current websites and apps. The reason given was decreased viability of ad supported platforms and increased competition from big companies.

SparkPeople was reopened by Chris Downie with a paid model on October 5, 2026.

== See also ==
- List of diets
