= Grapefruit diet =

Type of diet

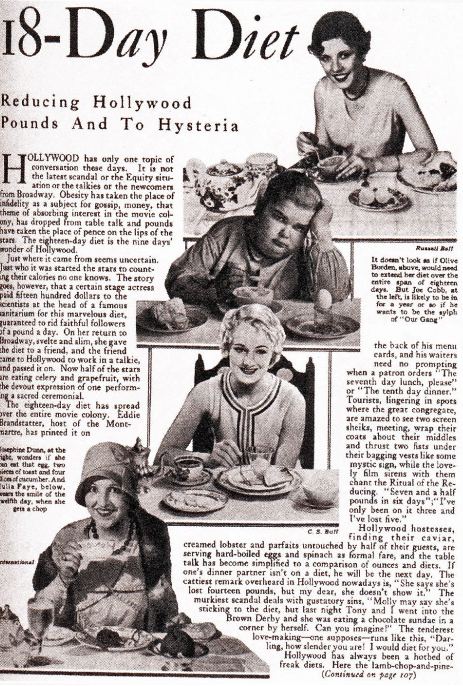
1929 article on the 18-Day Diet

The Grapefruit diet (also known as the Hollywood diet and the 18-Day diet) is a short-term fad diet that has existed in the United States since at least the 1930s. There are variations on the diet, although it generally consists of eating one half of a grapefruit at each meal, along with meat, eggs, other foods that are rich in fat and protein, and certain vegetables. Sugar, fruits (other than grapefruit), sweet vegetables, grains and starchy vegetables are to be avoided. The grapefruit diet is thus a low-carbohydrate diet. A typical breakfast menu usually includes bacon and eggs. The diet is based on the claim that grapefruit has a fat-burning enzyme or similar property. The grapefruit diet does not require exercise. The grapefruit diet lasts for 10 to 12 days followed by 2 days off.

== History ==
The grapefruit diet originated in the 1930s. Initially, it was referred to as the "eighteen-day diet" in 1929, consisting of grapefruit, orange, toast, vegetable and egg combinations for 18 days, totaling approximately 500 kilocalories (2,100 kJ). The originator of the diet is not known. One rumour traces the diet to actress Ethel Barrymore, who is alleged to have paid William James Mayo and his brother $500 (equivalent to $10,000 in 2025) to create a special diet for her. The diet then became a fad in Hollywood and spread throughout America. The Mayo Clinic has disavowed the grapefruit diet.

Novelist Fannie Hurst was a notable devotee of the diet. It was re-popularized in the 1980s and nicknamed the "10-day, 10-pounds-off diet". The idea that grapefruit eaten before ａ meal acts as a "catalyst" to burn body fat has no evidence from biochemistry.

== Health risks ==
The diet was criticized as early as 1935. Carl Malmberg commented that it lacks in all the necessary minerals (calcium, phosphorus and iron) and in vitamin A. He noted that many people became ill on the diet and "casualties" were heavy around Hollywood. In 1936, Lewis Wolberg described the diet as "nonsensical, irrational and even dangerous".

The variations of the grapefruit diet that are too low in calories (below 800–1,000 calories a day), too low in carbohydrates, or too low in essential micronutrients are considered unhealthy and potentially dangerous. While eating half a grapefruit with every meal may be a good way to incorporate more fruit in the diet of a healthy person, grapefruit and grapefruit juice is harmful if the dieter is allergic to citrus, or is taking medicines that can interact with grapefruit juice. This diet will not be beneficial to anyone when followed long-term, as the extremely low calorie intake could lead to malnutrition and many health problems.

== In popular culture ==
"Weird Al" Yankovic included the track "Grapefruit Diet," a parody of Cherry Poppin' Daddies' "Zoot Suit Riot," on his 1999 album Running With Scissors.

== See also ==
- List of diets § Fad diets
