= Whole30 =

30-day elimination fad diet

The Whole30 is a 30-day elimination fad diet that emphasizes whole foods and the elimination of sugar, alcohol, grain, and dairy. The traditional Whole30 also eliminates legumes and soy, while a plant-based version of the Whole30 allows consumption of those food groups. The traditional Whole30 is similar to but more restrictive than the paleo diet, as adherents may not eat natural sweeteners like honey or maple syrup. There is no scientific evidence to support health claims made by Whole30 and limited independent research has been conducted on the diet.

== Description ==
Foods allowed during the traditional Whole30 program include meat, nuts, seeds, seafood, eggs, vegetables, and fruits. During the Whole30, participants are advised not to count calories or to weigh themselves. After the program is complete, participants are counseled to strategically reintroduce foods outside the endorsed Whole30 list, document the health consequences and culinary value of these additions, and determine whether the addition is desired. The program's founders believe that sugar, grains, dairy, alcohol, and legumes may affect weight, energy, and stress levels. Losing weight is not a focus of Whole30; calorie-counting and weigh-ins are not allowed.

== History ==
The program was created by then wife and husband Melissa (Hartwig) Urban and Dallas Hartwig in April 2009. They both became certified sports nutritionists; he worked as a physical therapist, and she was working at an insurance company during the day and doing nutritional consulting in her spare time. She quit her job to run the Whole30 business in 2010. They co-authored It Starts with Food (2012) and The Whole30: The 30-Day Guide to Total Health and Food Freedom (2015). They separated in 2015. Melissa (Hartwig) Urban took over the business, and published Food Freedom Forever: Letting Go of Bad Habits, Guilt, and Anxiety Around Food in 2016.

In July 2016, a New York Times article on use of Instagram by dieters noted that participants in the Whole30 program had shared over one million Instagram posts using the #Whole30 hashtag, and noted that those sharing the tag were "one of seemingly endless like-minded communities," comparing it with the over 3.5 million posts under the #WeightWatchers hashtag.

As of 2018, the "Whole30" trademark had been licensed to Applegate, Blue Apron, Whole Foods Market, Snap Kitchen, and Thrive Market.

== Reception ==
No studies that specifically look into the health impacts of the Whole30 had been conducted as of 2019. While most dietitians generally agree with the program's emphasis on proteins, vegetables and unprocessed foods and the avoidance of added sugars and alcohol, some also view the diet as too extreme.

The diet ranked last among 38 popular diets evaluated by U.S. News & World Report in its 2016 Best Diets Rankings; one of the raters, dietitian Meridan Zerner said: "We want behavioral changes and dietary changes that are slow and progressive and meaningful." David L. Katz said of the diet: "The grouping [of banned foods] is both random, and rather bizarre from a nutrition perspective. If the idea is good nutrition, cutting out whole grains and legumes is at odds with a boatload of evidence." It was selected as one of the worst health trends for 2013 by Health magazine.

In 2017, the diet was ranked last (out of 38 diets) by U.S. News & World Report on account of its extremely restrictive nature and likely adverse effects on a dieter's social life. In 2018, the Whole30 was ranked 37th out of 40 by U.S. News & World Report, and in 2019, it was ranked 38th out of 41.
