= Morning banana diet =

Japanese fad diet from 2008

The Morning Banana Diet is a fad diet that was popular in Japan in 2008 and had some practice in the West.

The diet plan allows consumption of unlimited bananas with room temperature water or a serving of milk for breakfast. Although technically the diet allows unlimited banana consumption, nutritionists suggest that "a healthy person can consume at least seven-and-half bananas before reaching the recommended level" of potassium, a dietary mineral in bananas. Lunch and dinner food choices are unrestricted. Users can have one or more bananas as a snack between meals, but no other desserts are permitted. Nothing is eaten after 8 pm, and the dieter must go to bed by midnight.

The diet was created by Osaka pharmacist Sumiko Watanabe, for her husband Hitoshi Watanabe, who lost 37 pounds (17 kg) in weight. He popularized the diet when he wrote it on Mixi, one of Japan's largest social networking services. Over 730,000 Morning Banana Diet books were sold in 2008.

Possible problems with the diet include the misuse of the unregulated lunch and dinner. A spokesperson for the American Dietetic Association told the Daily News: "There's nothing magical about a banana....It's not well-defined or scientifically based. Whenever you have a diet that says eat all you want, there's the possibility that people who are prone to overeating will have problems".
