= Immune Power Diet =

The Immune Power Diet is a pseudoscientific elimination diet promoted by physician Stuart M. Berger (1953–1994). The diet was based on the false idea that many people have hidden food allergies and that by eliminating certain foods and taking dietary supplements the body's immune system would be strengthened.

== History ==
Berger authored Dr. Berger's Immune Power Diet in 1985. The book states that different health problems including AIDS and obesity are the result of an "immune hypersensitivity response" to common foods and that "detoxification", dietary supplements and weight loss can strengthen the immune system.

Berger advises his readers to eliminate what he called the "Sinister Seven" from their diets, as they cause immune damage. These include dairy, wheat, yeast, eggs, corn, soy and sugar. After "detoxifying" the immune system and elimination was completed, these foods could be gradually eaten again, but no more than once every four days.

In 1994, an autopsy revealed that Berger died from hypertension and cardiovascular disease. Contributing factors to his death were cocaine addiction and obesity.

== Criticism ==
The Immune Power Diet was criticized as unscientific and described as quackery by nutritionists. The Harvard Medical School Health Letter suggested the book was fiction and based on quack ideas about food allergies. The diet may cause malnutrition.

Berger's claim that 30% of American people have food allergies is not supported by scientific research. The real figure (as of 2017) is less than 4%.

Berger advocated dangerous megavitamin supplements for different ills which were unsupported by scientific evidence. Nutritionist Jack Z. Yetiv noted that Berger recommended his patients to megadose on Vitamin B6 supplements but these have been shown to be toxic in large amounts and the cause of irreversible nerve damage.

The Immune Power Diet is listed by immunologists as an ineffective treatment for AIDS.

== See also ==
- Fad diet
