= Sonoma diet =

Lifestyle plan

The Sonoma Diet (also known as the New Sonoma Diet) is a lifestyle plan that was devised by nutritionist Connie Guttersen, and is a derivation of the Mediterranean diet.

== See also ==
- List of diets
