= Discretionary food =

Discretionary food is a term for foods and drinks not necessary to provide the nutrients the human body's needs, but that may add variety to a person's diet.

== Definition ==
Australia's National Health and Medical Research Council describes discretionary foods as "foods and drinks not necessary to provide the nutrients the body needs, but that may add variety. However, many of these are high in saturated fats, sugars, salt and/or alcohol, and are therefore described as energy dense. They can be included sometimes in small amounts by those who are physically active, but are not a necessary part of the diet."
