= Cotton ball diet =

Fad diet

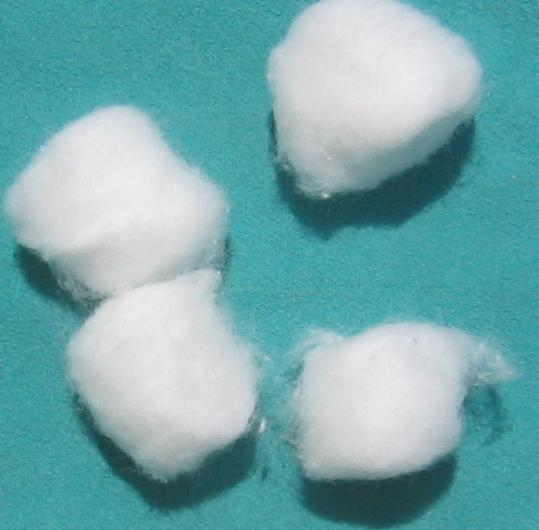
Cotton balls

The cotton ball diet is a fad diet that involves consuming cotton balls dipped in liquids such as juices or smoothies. The cotton is intended to make a person's stomach feel full without them gaining weight. The diet has been repeatedly condemned as dangerous.

== Health risks ==
Cotton can cause blockages in the digestive system. Blockage in the intestines could result in dehydration, bowel obstruction which may cause the death of the gastrointestinal tract and damage to internal organs. The diet will also result in a nutrition disorder.

The diet can also cause choking because the cotton balls cannot be broken down and must be eaten whole. Most "cotton" balls are actually made from bleached polyester rather than cotton, and toxins in the synthetic ingredients of cotton balls can build up over time and cause organ damage.

The diet is considered to be an indicator of an eating disorder.
