= Monotrophic diet =

Fad diet involving eating only a single food

A monotrophic diet (also known as mono diet or single-food diet) is a type of human diet that involves eating only one food item (such as potatoes or apples) or one type of food (such as fruits or meats). Monotrophic diets may be followed for food faddism motives, as a form of crash dieting, to initiate an elimination diet or to practice an extreme form of alternative medicine.

== Examples ==
There are examples throughout history of eccentrics living on monotrophic diets. For example, George Sitwell ate only roasted chicken. Howard Hughes would sometimes spend weeks eating nothing but canned soup and at other times only steak sandwiches.

=== Monotrophic diets ===
Beef

A stricter type of carnivore diet known as the lion diet or all-meat diet that has been promoted by Jordan Peterson involves only consuming beef with salt and water.

Eggs

Piero di Cosimo, an Italian painter, ate only boiled eggs. Antonio Magliabechi's diet was commonly three hard-boiled eggs.

In 2008, it was reported that Charles Saatchi lost four stone (56 pounds) from an egg-only diet for nine months. However, the claim that he ate only eggs for this period of time was disputed.

Milk

In the 1920s, the milk-diet fad was popularized by physical culturist Bernarr Macfadden. He advertised the diet as a remedy for diverse ailments such as eczema, hay fever and impotence. Macfadden's milk-only regime recommended 28 cups of milk a day.

Potatoes

In 2010, Chris Voigt, executive director of the Washington State Potato Commission, ate twenty potatoes a day for two months. He accepted that the diet is not sustainable in the long term but said his experiment had revealed how "truly healthy" potatoes are.

In 2016, comedian and magician Penn Jillette began his weight-loss regimen with a mono diet, eating only potatoes for two weeks, then adding in other healthy foods to change his eating habits.

== Health concerns ==
Long-term negative effects of a single-food diet may include anaemia, osteoporosis, malnutrition, nutrient toxicities, muscle catabolism and more serious health conditions. Possible side effects are constipation, diarrhea, fatigue and exacerbated mood issues. Some experts have noted that pursuing any kind of mono diet may be a sign of an eating disorder developing.

== See also ==
- Diet (nutrition)
- List of diets
