= John A. McDougall =

American physician and author (1947–2024)

- McDougall in 2019
- Born: May 17, 1947; Detroit, Michigan, U.S.
- Died: June 22, 2024 (aged 77); Portland, Oregon
- Education: Michigan State University College of Human Medicine (M.D.)
- Occupations: Physician; author
- Known for: Advocacy of the "McDougall Plan", a low-fat fad diet based on starchy foods and vegetables
- Notable work: The McDougall Plan (1983); The Starch Solution (2012)
- Website: www.drmcdougall.com

John A. McDougall (May 17, 1947 – June 22, 2024) was an American physician and author. He wrote a number of diet books advocating the consumption of a low-fat vegan diet based on starchy foods and vegetables.

His eponymous diet, called The McDougall Plan, was a New York Times bestseller. It has been categorized as a low-fat fad diet. The diet rejects all animal products as well as cooking oils, processed food, alcoholic beverages and caffeinated drinks. As with any restrictive low-fat diet, it may lead to flatulence, possibly poor mineral absorption from excess fiber, and limited food choices that may lead to a feeling of deprivation.

== Background ==
At the age of 18, McDougall had a stroke. The experience led him to study medicine. McDougall was a graduate of Michigan State University's College of Human Medicine. He performed his internship at The Queen's Medical Center in Honolulu, Hawaii, in 1972 and his medical residency at the University of Hawaiʻi. McDougall contributed to the Vegetarian Times magazine and appeared on television talk shows.

McDougall was also a member of the advisory board of the Physicians Committee for Responsible Medicine (PCRM). In 2016, he was one of four named plaintiffs in a lawsuit by the PCRM alleging improper influence by the egg industry on establishing cholesterol recommendations in the US. The lawsuit was dismissed in 2016.

In 2018, McDougall received the American College of Lifestyle Medicine 2018 Lifetime Achievement Award.

== Diet programs and products ==
In 2002, McDougall began the McDougall Program at the Flamingo Resort and Spa in Santa Rosa, California. The program is a 10-day residential treatment program which features a low-fat, starch-based, vegan diet.

The McDougall diet is a low-fat starch-based diet that is high in fiber and contains no cholesterol. The diet is 90% starch-based. It is based on a variety of starches such as rice, potatoes, corn, breads, pasta with fresh or frozen fruits and vegetables.

McDougall was the co-founder of the now Woodland-based Dr. McDougall's Right Foods Inc., which produces dried and packaged soups, manufactured for it by the SF Spice Co.

McDougall promoted his diet as an alternative treatment for a number of chronic disorders, including arthritis, atherosclerosis, cancer, diabetes, hypertension and osteoporosis.

== Reception ==
His book The McDougall Plan was on New York Times paperback "Advice, How-to, and Miscellaneous" bestseller list. The plan is classified as a low-fat fad diet in Wardlaw's Perspectives in Nutrition.

McDougall has been criticized for making unsubstantiated health claims. Some of McDougall's dietary recommendations are in line with mainstream nutritional advice, such as an emphasis on fruits, vegetables and whole grains, but others are considered extreme and are not supported by evidence. McDougall's diet plan has been called a low-fat fad diet that may lead to boredom with limited food choices, and feelings of deprivation because of exclusion of favorite foods. The high fiber content can cause flatulence and possibly interfere with mineral absorption.

The McDougall diet is very low-fat, high-carbohydrate and vegan. Sodium intake is restricted and no animal products or added oils are permitted. A review noted that "iron, zinc, vitamin B12, vitamin D, calcium, and omega-3 are potential nutritional deficiencies from following such a strict diet", but also noted that one study had reported "improvements in predictors for cardiovascular and metabolic disease" in people using the diet, and that "improvements in low density lipoproteins cholesterol (LDL-C), total cholesterol, insulin, BMI, and fatigue severity scale scores were observed" in people using the diet.

In 1992, nutritionist Kurt Butler described McDougall's ideas as "vegetarian extremism" and McDougall as "Americas most influential vegan zealot" who has taken the low-fat vegetarian diet to extremes. He also suggested that McDougall's diet may increase the risk of calcium and iron deficiency and is not safe for children.

Reviewing McDougall's book The McDougall Program for Maximum Weight Loss, nutritionist Fredrick J. Stare and epidemiologist Elizabeth Whelan criticized its restrictive regime and "poor advice", concluding that the diet's concepts were "extreme and out of keeping with nutritional reality". The authors state that failure to consume dairy products creates a risk for osteoporosis, and that if animal products cannot be replaced with peanut butter and soybean foods, vegans may not obtain enough protein. Reviewing The McDougall Program: 12 Days to Dynamic Health, doctor Harriet Hall wrote that the book is filled with anecdotes and questionable statements, and that it makes many claims which are not supported by science. Hall concluded that "Some of McDougall's recommendations are in line with mainstream advice, but there is reason to fear that strict adherence to his whole Program might result in nutritional deficits that could do more harm than good."

McDougall's diet was studied as a potential treatment for relapsing remitting multiple sclerosis, but showed no changes in brain MRI outcomes, MS relapses or disability.

The American Heart Association (AHA) gave the McDougall diet a 73% score of its alignment with the 2021 AHA Dietary Guidance. They noted that a defining feature of very low-fat diets like the McDougall diet is severe restriction of dietary fat with the avoidance of vegetable oils, nuts, seeds and avocados which is not in alignment with the 2021 AHA Dietary Guidance as there is no restriction on these foods.

== Death ==
McDougall died in his sleep on June 22, 2024, at the age of 77. His family declined to give the cause of death.

== Selected publications ==
McDougall wrote several books, with his wife Mary contributing recipes, which had sold more than 1.5 million copies as of 2008.

=== Books ===
- McDougall, John; McDougall, Mary (October 22, 1983). The McDougall Plan. New Win Publishing. ISBN 978-0-8329-0392-2. OL 8187699M.
- McDougall, John (January 1, 1985). McDougall's Medicine: A Challenging Second Opinion. New Century Publishers. ISBN 978-0-8329-0407-3. OL 2540426M.
- McDougall, John (August 1, 1991). The McDougall Program: 12 Days to Dynamic Health. Penguin. ISBN 978-1-101-64511-6. OL 1939857W.
- McDougall, John (April 1, 1995). The McDougall Program for Maximum Weight Loss. Plume. ISBN 978-1-101-64512-3. OL 22947920M.
- McDougall, John; McDougall, Mary (January 1, 1997). The New McDougall Cookbook. Plume. ISBN 978-0-452-27465-5. OL 21797539W.
- McDougall, John (March 1, 1998). The McDougall Program for a Healthy Heart. Plume. ISBN 978-0-452-27266-8. OL 7590602M.
- McDougall, John (January 1, 1999). The McDougall Program for Women. Dutton. ISBN 978-0-525-94209-2. OL 939860W.
- McDougall, John; McDougall, Mary (April 1, 1999). The McDougall Quick and Easy Cookbook. Plume. ISBN 978-1-101-11917-4. OL 1939855W.
- McDougall, John (September 1, 2006). Dr. McDougall's Digestive Tune-Up. New Century Publishers. ISBN 978-1-57067-184-5. OL 1939852W.
- McDougall, John; McDougall, Mary (May 8, 2012). The Starch Solution. Rodale Books. ISBN 978-1-60961-393-8. OL 25139164M.
