= Kimkins =

Online diet program

Kimkins is an online diet program created by Heidi Diaz under the pseudonym 'Kimmer' that became famous in 2007 in the magazine Woman's World. The program became embroiled in controversy when it was found that its founder was morbidly obese and had provided some false testimonials on her website.

== Overview ==
The diet was developed by Diaz on Lowcarbfriends.com—an online message board focusing on low-carbohydrate diets . Diaz left the board in 2006 to start Kimkins with a partner, and in January 2007 People featured a column on extreme weight loss that mentioned Kimkins. The program gained popularity when Woman's World published a feature on the diet and its creator 'Kim Drake' in their June 12, 2007 issue. In August 2007, considerable negative coverage of the diet began appearing on the internet, particularly in the form of blogs and several of the site's administrators were fired after publicly questioning the diet. In September 2007, a private investigator was hired to investigate Diaz, exposing her real identity as well as publishing numerous photos demonstrating she was morbidly obese.

== Lawsuit ==
A class action lawsuit was launched against the website in March, 2008 after it was revealed that the diet's creator was a 300-pound woman named Heidi Diaz who was promoting the diet under the pseudonym Kim 'Kimmer' Drake. During investigations for the suit it was found that the website took in $1,200,000 during the month of June 2007 alone. It also was revealed that the post-weight loss photos were taken from a mail-order bride website rather than actually representing someone who actually had undertaken the diet. Numerous testimonials on the website were falsified, and several of the website employees have been fired for questioning the safety of the diet.

== Consumer concerns ==
Members of the website were banned after they disagreed with Diaz online. People who failed to lose weight were quickly blamed for not adhering to the diet strictly enough. Diaz encouraged people to continue following the plan despite showing signs of eating disorders. The diet won an award for "Worst Product for 2008" from the website healthyweight.net.

The Los Angeles Better Business Bureau gave the company a rating of "F," which means they "strongly question the company’s reliability for reasons such as that they have failed to respond to complaints, their advertising is grossly misleading, they are not in compliance with the law’s licensing or registration requirements, their complaints contain especially serious allegations, or the company’s industry is known for its fraudulent business practices."
