= Fad diet =

Diet with unscientific claims

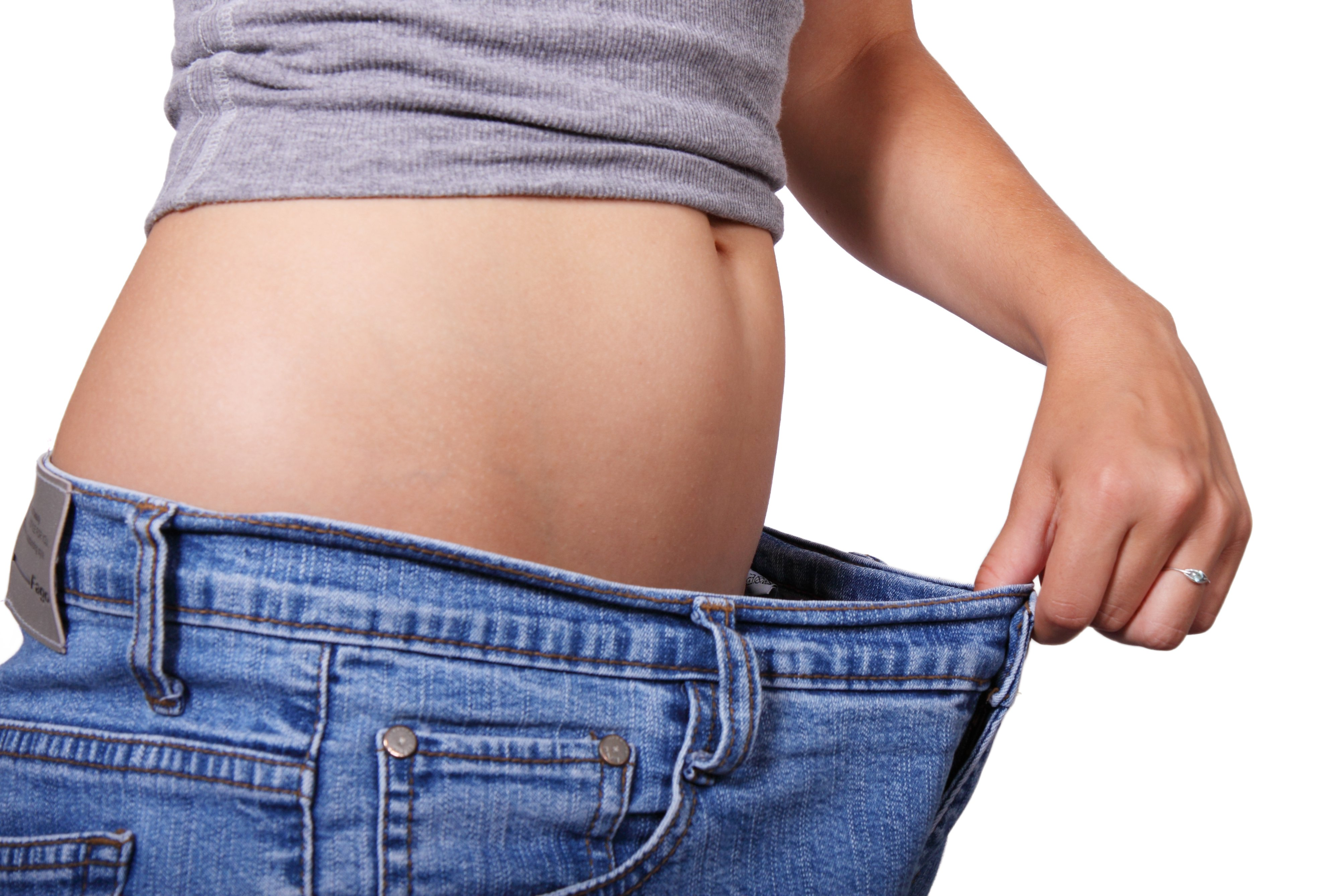
Fad diets are non-standard diets that often promise dramatic weight loss. However, they are usually not supported by scientific evidence, and they sometimes offer dangerous dietary advice.

A fad diet is a diet that is generally used only for a short time, similar to fads in fashion, without being a standard scientific dietary recommendation. They often make unreasonable claims for fast weight loss or health improvements, and as such are often considered a type of pseudoscientific diet. Fad diets are usually not supported by clinical research and their health recommendations are not peer-reviewed, thereby leading to unsubstantiated statements about health and disease.

Generally, fad diets promise an assortment of desired changes requiring little effort, thus attracting the interest of consumers uneducated about whole-diet, whole-lifestyle changes necessary for sustainable health. Fad diets are often promoted with exaggerated claims, such as rapid weight loss of more than 1 kg/week, improving health by "detoxification", or even more dangerous claims achieved through highly restrictive and nutritionally unbalanced food choices leading to malnutrition or even eating non-food items, such as cotton wool. Highly restrictive fad diets should be avoided. At best, fad diets may offer novel and engaging ways to reduce caloric intake, but at worst, they may be unsustainable, medically unsuitable, or even dangerous. Dietitian advice should be preferred before attempting any diet.

Celebrity endorsements are used to promote fad diets, which may generate significant revenue for the creators of the diets through the sale of associated products. Regardless of their evidence base, or lack thereof, fad diets are common, with over 1,500 books published each year, and many consumers willing to pay into an industry worth $35 billion per year in the United States. About 14–15% of Americans declare having used a fad diet for short-term weight loss.

== Description ==
=== Definition ===
There is no single definition of what a fad diet is, encompassing diverse diets with different approaches and evidence base, thus producing different outcomes, advantages, and disadvantages. Furthermore, labeling a diet as a fad is ever-changing, varying socially, culturally, and subjectively. However, a common definition lies in a diet promoting short-term changes instead of lifelong changes, and that common use (or lack thereof) has no association with a diet's effectiveness, nutritional soundness, or safety. The US Federal Trade Commission defines fad diets as those that are highly restrictive and promote energy-dense foods that are often poor in nutrients.

=== Types of fad diets ===
Although fad diets are ever-changing, most can be categorized in general groups:

- Physical or physiological testing, such as applied kinesiology and blood group analysis
- Low calorie diets:
  - Food-specific diets, which encourage eating large amounts of a single food, such as the cabbage soup diet
  - High-fiber, low-calorie diets, which often prescribe double the normal amount of dietary fiber
  - Liquid diets, such as SlimFast meal replacement drinks
  - Fasting
- Adequate-protein, low-carbohydrate diets, such as the Atkins diet, which was introduced in the 1970s

Fad diets are generally restrictive, and are characterized by promises of fast weight loss or great physical health (notably by "detoxification"), and which are not grounded in sound science.

Some fad diets, such as diets purporting to be alternative cancer treatments, promise health effects other than weight loss.

Commercial weight management organizations, such as Weight Watchers, were inappropriately associated with fad diets in the past.

Several factors can encourage a person to start a fad diet, such as sociocultural peer pressure on body image, reduced self-esteem, and persuasion by media.

=== Bad diets ===
Although not all fad diets are inherently detrimental to health, there are "red flags" of bad dietary advice, such as:

- Promising rapid weight loss of more than 1 kg (2.2 lb) per week or other extraordinary claims that are "too good to be true"
- Being nutritionally imbalanced, or highly restrictive, forbidding entire food groups, or even allowing one food or food type. In the most extreme form, they may claim that humans can survive without eating
- Recommending eating food in a specific order or combination, sometimes based on physiological properties, such as genetics or blood type
- Recommending specific foods purported to be detoxing or to "burn" fat
- Promises a one-size-fits-all "magic bullet with little to no effort, combined with other healthy lifestyle changes (exercise, for example)
- Based on anecdotal testimonials, such as personal success stories, instead of medical evidence from randomized controlled trials

== Health claims evaluations ==
Fad diets have variable results, as these include different diets. They tend to result in short-term weight loss, but afterwards, the weight is usually regained.

The restrictive approach, regardless of whether the diet prescribes eating large amounts of high-fiber vegetables, no grains, or no solid foods, tend to be nutritionally unsound, and can cause serious health problems if followed for more than a few days.

A considerable disadvantage of fad diets is that they encourage the notion of a diet as a short-term behavior, instead of a sustainable lifelong change. Indeed, fad diets often fail to re-educate dieters about healthy nutrition or portion control, and under-emphasize efforts that dieters cannot establish long-term maintenance of their desired weight, even if that weight is achieved in the short-term. Several diets are also unsustainable in the long-term, and thus dieters revert to old habits after deprivation of some foods which may lead to binge eating. Fad diets generally fail to address the causes of poor nutrition habits, and thus are unlikely to change the underlying behavior and the long-term outcomes.

Some fad diets are associated with increased risks of cardiovascular diseases, kidney stones, and mental disorders, such as eating disorders, depression, and dental risks. For instance, long-term low-carbohydrate high-fat diets are associated with increased cardiac and non-cardiac mortality. Teenagers following fad diets are at risk of permanently stunted growth.

Some fad diets do provide short-term and long-term results for individuals with specific illnesses, such as obesity or epilepsy. Very-low-calorie diets, also known as crash diets, are efficient for liver fat reduction and weight loss before bariatric surgery. Low-calorie and very-low-calorie diets may produce initially faster weight loss within the first weeks of starting compared to other diets, but this superficially faster loss is due to glycogen depletion and water loss in the lean body mass, and regained quickly afterward.

Diet success in weight loss and possible health effects is most predicted by adherence and negative energy balance, regardless of the diet type. Fad diets, with their common use and variety, may be useful to introduce obese individuals via a dietary plan tailored to their food preferences and lifestyle into long-term dietary and lifestyle changes under supervision by nutrition professionals. Various diets aiming at gentle caloric restriction under supervision, including commercial, fad, and standard care diets, have shown considerable and comparable success and safety, both in the short-term and long-term. Comprehensive diet programs are more effective than dieting without guidance. According to David L. Katz, "efforts to improve public health through diet are forestalled not for want of knowledge about the optimal feeding of Homo sapiens but for distractions associated with exaggerated claims, and our failure to convert what we reliably know into what we routinely do."

There is a commonly claimed figure that "95% of dieters regain their weight after a few years", but this is "clinical lore" based on a 1953 primary study, with newer evidence demonstrating long-term weight loss after dieting under supervision. A 2007 review found that one-third to two-thirds of dieters had slight to no long-term weight loss based on lesser quality trials, supporting Health at Every Size according to its authors. A 2017 review reported that extended calorie restriction suppresses overall and specific food cravings.

== Healthy diets ==
Improving dietary habits is a societal issue that should be considered when preparing national policies, according to the World Health Organization, which proposes a set of recommendations for a healthy diet:

- Achieve an energy balance and maintain a healthy weight.
- Promote the consumption of fruits, vegetables, whole-grains, nuts, seeds, peas, beans, legumes, herbs, and spices.
- Limit sweets and sugar.
- Limit salt from all sources and ensure salt is iodized.
- Limit total fat consumption and in particular replace saturated fats by unsaturated fats as much as possible, and eliminate trans-fatty acids.

The 2015–2020 Dietary Guidelines for Americans implement these recommendations in the US, as follows:

- Follow a lifelong healthy eating pattern.
- Focus on variety, nutrient density, and quantity.
- Limit calories from added sugars and saturated fats. Reduce sodium intake.
- Prefer healthier food and beverage choices, such as nutrient-dense foods. These preferences should account for cultural and personal preferences to make application easier.
- Community support of healthy eating patterns for everyone.

Contrary to the previous editions, which mainly focused on dietary components such as food groups and nutrients, the US guidelines offer a more global approach focusing on eating patterns and nutrients characteristics as "people do not eat food groups and nutrients in isolation but rather in combination, and the totality of the diet forms an overall eating pattern". Indeed, "the components of the eating pattern can have interactive and potentially cumulative effects on health", noting that "these patterns can be tailored to an individual's personal preferences, enabling Americans to choose the diet that is right for them".

Several diets have shown sufficient evidence of safety and constant beneficial effects to be recommended. These include the DASH diet for anyone, but especially for cardiac risk prevention in obesity and diabetes, the Mediterranean diet with similar indications, the U.S. Department of Agriculture "MyPlate" for healthy diet guidelines, and the ketogenic diet for reducing risk of seizures in people with epilepsy.

== History ==
=== Ancient history ===
The word "diet" comes from the Greek diaita, which described a whole lifestyle, including mental and physical, rather than a narrow weight-loss regimen. The Greek and Roman physicians considered that how a body functioned was largely dependent on the foods eaten, and that different foods could affect people in different ways.

Western medical science at the time was founded on diatetica, the "fundamental healing therapy of a regimen of certain foods". Overweight or being too slim were seen as signs of an unhealthy body, with an imbalance of its four essential "humours" (black bile, yellow bile, blood, and phlegm).

The earliest diet known is from one of the oldest surviving medical documents, the Ebers papyrus (circa 1550 BC), which described a recipe for an antidiabetic diet of wheat germ and okra. An early dietary fad is known from about 500–400 BC, when athletes and warriors consumed deer livers and lion hearts, thinking these products would impart benefits such as bravery, speed, or strength.

In the Corpus Hippocraticum, Hippocrates, a Greek philosopher and physician c. 460–370 BC, describes his views on human health, as being primarily influenced by alimentation and the environment we inhabit. He thought that the underlying principles of health were food and exercise, what he called "work", and that a high food intake needed a lot of hard work to be properly assimilated. A failure to balance work and food intake would upset the body's metabolism and incur diseases. As he wrote: "Man cannot live healthily on food without a certain amount of exercise". He thought that changes in food intake should be made progressively to avoid upsetting the body. He made several recommendations, some of which being: walking or running after eating, wrestling, avoiding drinks outside of meals, dry foods for obese people, never missing a breakfast and eat only just one main meal a day, bathing in only lukewarm water, avoiding sex, and the more dangerous "induction of vomiting", which he considered particularly beneficial. Nowadays, these advices seem mixed, some sensible, others inadvisable or even dangerous, but they made sense at the time given the contemporary knowledge and practices. For example, induced vomiting was quite popular, almost an art form. The importance of foods was further established by one of his followers, who became extremely influential, the Greek physician Galen (129 – ca. 216 AD), with his work On the Power of Foods, where he claimed that good doctors should also be good cooks, and provided several recipes.

In the classical world, what foods were eaten, and how much, played an important role in ethical, philosophical, and political teachings and thinking, centered on the ideas of luxury and corruption. Food was for sustenance alone, overindulging was morally and physically bad, at least a manifestation of a lack of self-control, but at worst leading to further passions and greed of other luxuries.

=== 19th century ===
Fad diets as we know them really started during the Victorian era in the 19th century. A competitive market for "healthy diets" arose in the 19th-century developed world, as migration and industrialization and commodification of food supplies began eroding adherence to traditional ethno-cultural diets, and the health consequences of pleasure-based diets were becoming apparent. As Matt Fitzgerald describes it:

This modern cult of healthy eating is made up of innumerable sub-cults that are constantly vying for superiority. ... Like consumer products in commercial markets, each of these diets has a brand name and is advertised as being better than competing brands. The recruiting programs of the healthy-diet cults consist almost entirely of efforts to convince prospective followers that their diet is the One True Way to eat for maximum physical health ... The specific cult whose "science"-backed schtick a person finds most convincing usually depends on his or her identity biases.

Many fad diets, at the time called "foodie", were promoted during the 19th century.

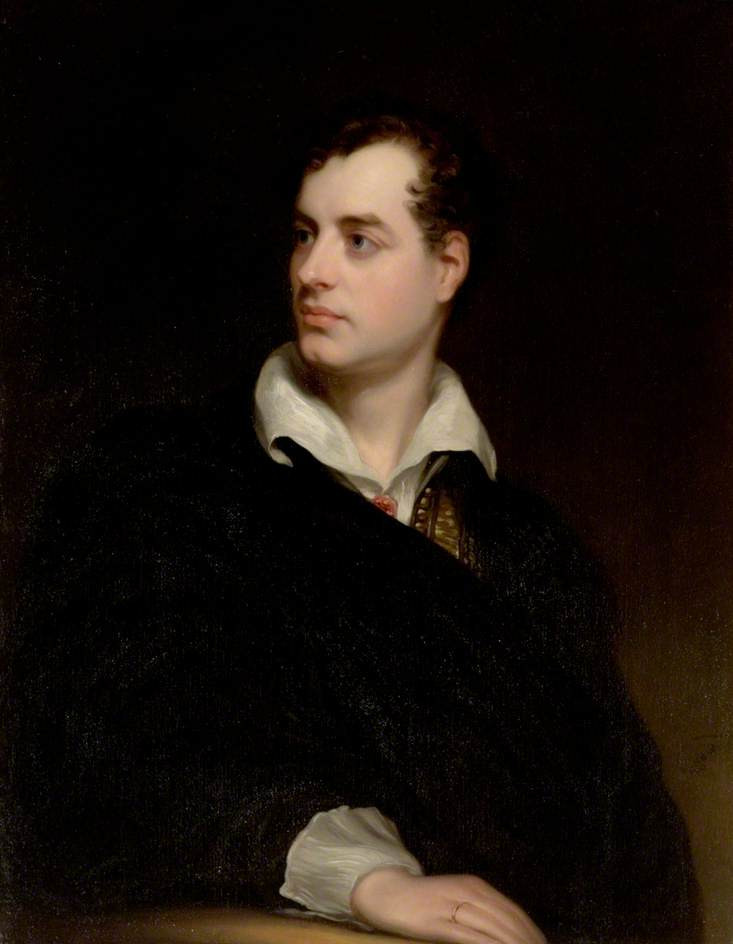
Lord Byron tried all kinds of fad diets, and devised one, the "vinegar and water diet" in the 1820s.

Lord Byron was obsessed with his appearance, as he had a "morbid propensity to fatten". He tried several diets, such as his favorite meal of biscuits and soda water, and others which he devised, such as the "vinegar and water diet" in the 1820s, which was very popular at the time, and involved drinking water with apple cider vinegar. He would cycle perpetually between self starvation, measurements, and binge eating. His influence was such that he was accused of encouraging melancholia and emotional volatility on Romantic youth, making girls "sicken and waste away". Indeed, according to Byron, "a woman should never be seen eating or drinking, unless it be lobster salad and champagne, the only truly feminine and becoming viands". His views on women's diets and appearances worried his contemporaries, such as the American physician George Miller Beard, who fretted that young ladies may live their growing girlhood in semi-starvation because of their fears of "incurring the horror of disciples of Lord Byron".

In 1825, Jean Brillat-Savarin wrote about a low carbohydrate diet and focusing on chewing and swallowing to better taste food and supposedly eat less. This idea would later reappear in 1903 under the name of "Fletcherizing", derived from its author's name Horace Fletcher, "a self-taught nutritionist". Fletcher promoted chewing all food until it was thoroughly mixed with saliva, to the point that it was swallowed in a liquid state.

"Banting" or "to bant" became a highly popular synonym of dieting in 1863, when William Banting published "A Letter on Corpulence", which detailed the first known low-carbohydrate diet, which he followed from Dr. William Harvey, a surgeon known for a starch- and sugar-free diet treatment for diabetes. He immediately lost weight, from 202 to 156 pounds eventually. Banting is credited for writing the first diet book, which at his death in 1878 sold more than 58,000 copies over a total of 12 editions published between 1863 and 1902. Although the 2500 copies of the first and second editions were printed at his expenses and distributed for free, in the hopes of "benefitting to the working-class people", he sold later copies.

Around the same time, Sylvester Graham, of Graham cracker fame, is often given credit for creating the first fad diet in the 1830s and is considered the father of all modern diets. The diet recognized the importance of whole grains food. Designed from a religious motivation, Graham promoted a raw-food vegetarian diet that was lower in salt and fat, emphasizing an anti-industrial, anti-medical "simpler" or "natural" lifestyle, opposing the meat and other rich, calorie-dense foods produced in great quantities in the industrial era, declaring them "sinful". In 1830, he was appointed a general agent of the Pennsylvanian Temperance Society. During his time there, and due to his history, and inspired by the French vitalist school of medicine, he thought nutrition had moral as well as physical qualities, and viewed any desire for food or drink not due to necessity (stark hunger or thirst) to be depravation. Consequently, he viewed gluttony as the debilitating consequence of an unhealthy urge. He was determined to fight against what he perceived as nutritional "debauchery" and gluttony. He became a controversial figure, an evangelical New England preacher and speaker, with his spartan views on nutrition at a time when Americans' diets were primarily made of meat and white bread, by advocating adamantly in favor of raw vegetarian food and whole-grain food, authorizing but limiting meat, and forbidding highly refined or commercially baked white bread. He also described the use of corsets as "disfiguring" and advocated loose, comfortable clothing, which further attracted women to his precepts. After his death in 1851, his followers, dubbed "Grahamites", most of them being women but also including famous men such as John Harvey Kellogg of cornflakes fame, continued to advocate vegetarianism, temperance, and bran bread. Graham's ideas proved to have a lasting influence on American diet, as the per capita meat consumption dropped gradually in the subsequent years, whereas vegetable consumption increased and Americans started to eat more balanced diets.

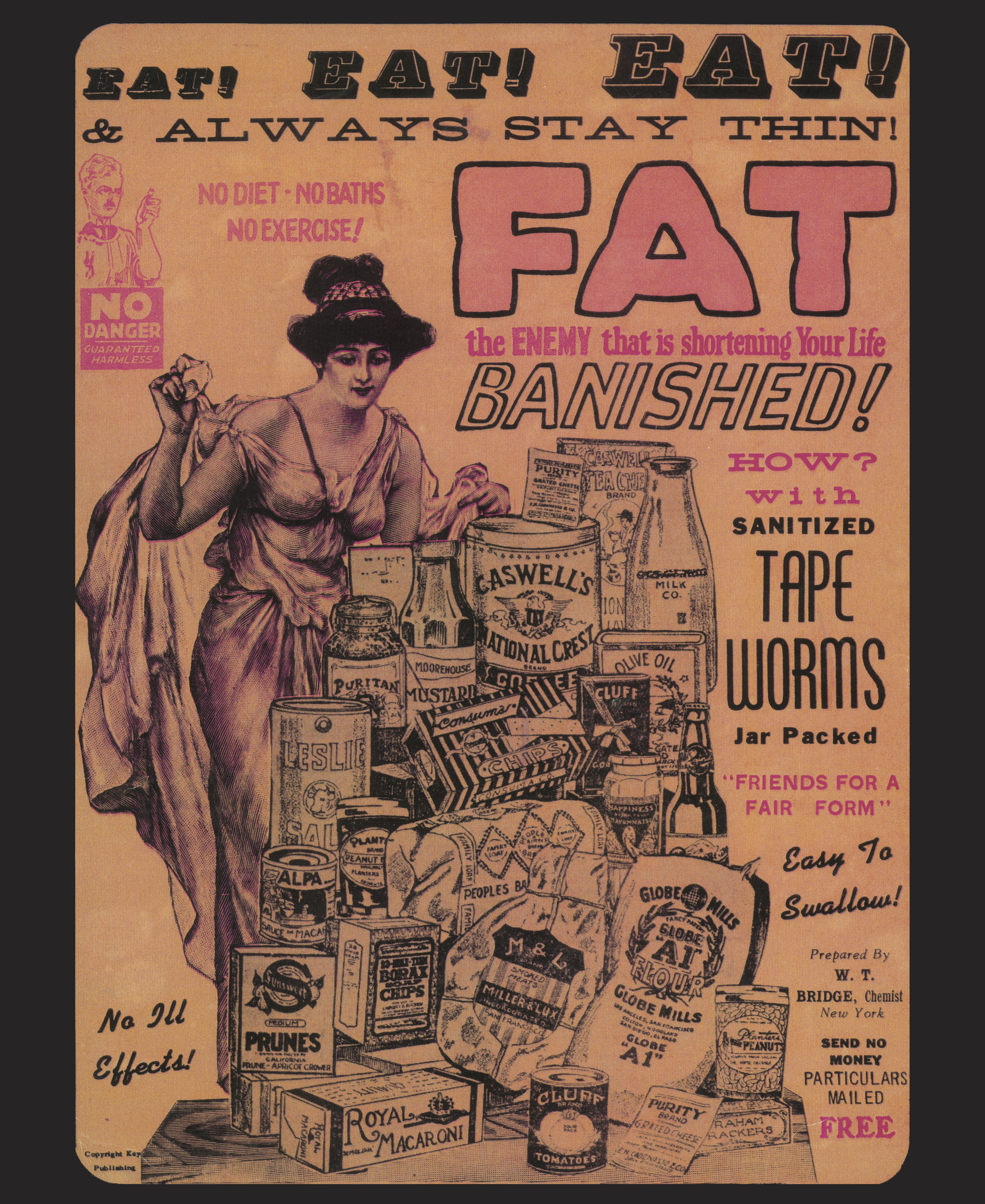
The tapeworm diet involved dieters who would willfully ingest tapeworms to absorb food in the intestine.

The 19th century also saw the first and one of the most dangerous fad diet pills, with the marketing of arsenic pills for weight loss, which not only did not work, but which dieters often consumed more quantity than the prescribed dosage. Some diet hoaxes also appeared, such as the tapeworms diet, where the dieters would purportedly willfully ingest tapeworms in the hopes they would reach maturity in the intestines and absorb food, until the dieter attains the weight loss goal and consumes an anti-parasitic pill to kill and hopefully excrete the worms, if the dieter was lucky enough to not experience gastric obstruction.

=== 20th century ===
The concept calorie restriction appeared under the name of "calorie counting" in the 1917 book "Diet and Health, With Key to the Calories" by Lulu Hunt Peters.

Other fad diets appeared in the 1930s. The grapefruit diet was a low-calorie plan, which became popular and known as the "Hollywood diet", and involved eating grapefruit or its juice with other items such as toast or eggs, totaling about 500 calories per day. Such liquid diets, cleanses and detox diets would become common over the following decades with the Master Cleanse or Lemonade Diet in 1941 and Last Chance Diet in 1976. Around the same time, in 1925, Lucky Strike launched the "cigarette diet", relying on the appetite-suppressing effect of nicotine, with the famous marketing slogan "Reach for a Lucky instead of a sweet". The use of amphetamines, initially designed to treat narcolepsy, skyrocketed when doctors began prescribing them for appetite suppression and the treatment of depression, becoming successful among fad diets. Despite the American Medical Association opposing this use of amphetamines as early as 1943 due to problems of addiction, doctors continued to prescribe them, in addition to barbiturates to reduce the addiction cravings. The first liquid protein diet appeared also in the 1930s with the marketing of the "Dr. Stoll's Aid".

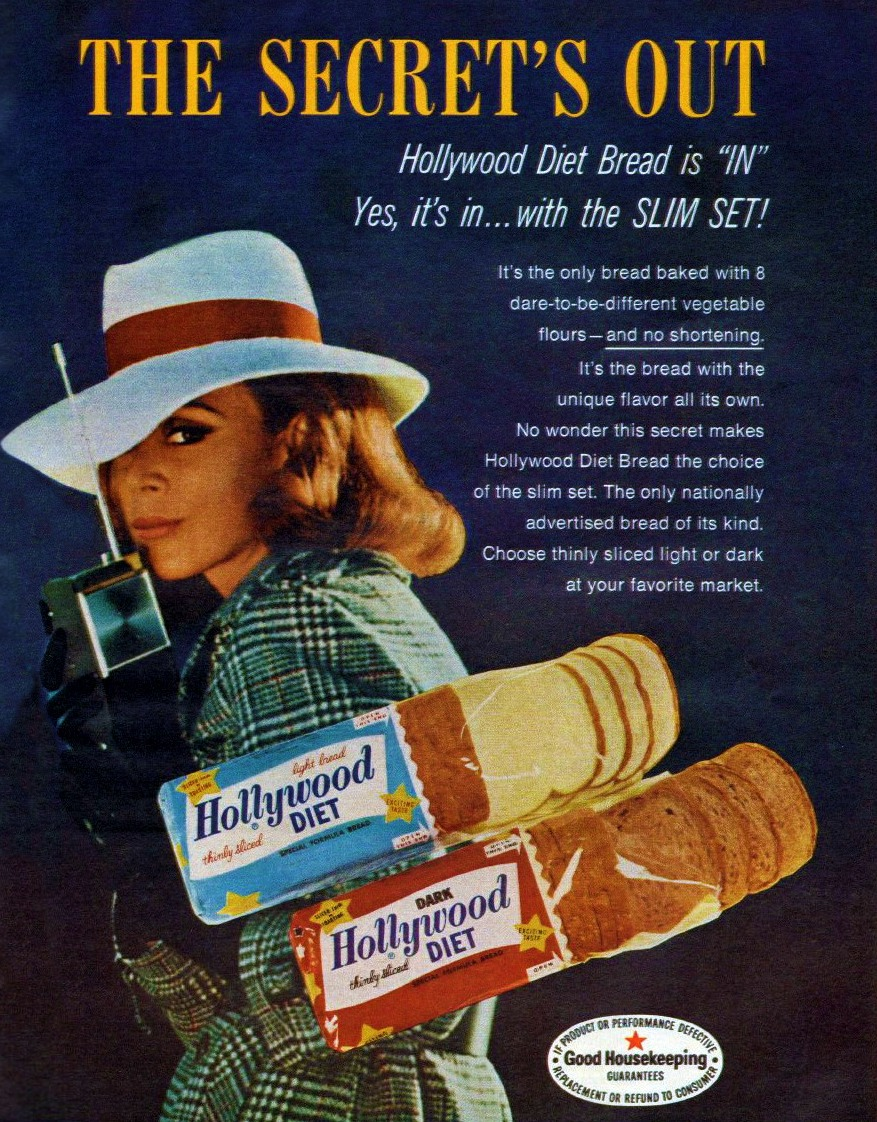
An advertisement for a bread using the contemporaneously popular Hollywood Diet as a selling argument

In 1950, the "cabbage soup diet", another liquid diet, appeared, being highly restrictive but promising great weight loss in the first week, at the expense of causing flatulence. Later, and although it did not become a fad for another generation, the Zen macrobiotic diet was developed by the Japanese philosopher George Ohsawa, purporting a "yin and yang of food" to help maintain the body's balance, and proposing a grain-heavy diet composed of 50–60% of whole grains (e.g., brown rice), discouraging refined or processed food and certain cooking techniques and utensils.

Bernarr Macfadden was another major figure of dieting in the 20th century, taking the legacy of Graham. Macfadden relentlessly promoted a dieting philosophy named "physical culture", the idea that nearly all diseases were caused by toxins in the blood from poor diet and lack of exercise, and that nearly all diseases could be cured through fasting, eating the correct foods, and physical exercise. Macfadden was one of the most effective promoter of diets in history, as he is believed by historians to be largely at the root of 20th- and 21st-century health and fitness practices in America. He became convinced that all health issues were due to nutrition. He advocated a diet similar to that avocated by Graham, plus regular fasting. His demise happened as a consequence of his extreme devotion to his own ideas: since he was convinced fasting could cure any ailment, he tried to treat a urinary tract blockage he developed in 1955 by fasting, which only caused emaciation which no doctor could undo.

Other notable food faddists of this era include Paul Bragg, Adelle Davis, and J. I. Rodale.

In 1961, Jean Nidetch founded the Weight Watchers. In 1970, the "sleeping beauty diet", using sedative pills to avoid eating, became popular. Slim Fast appeared in 1977, claimed as a "super diet" by having shakes for breakfast and lunch. In 1985, Fit for Life promoted a diet forbidding complex carbohydrates and proteins in the same meal. In 1992, 1995, and 2003, the Atkins diet, Zone diet and South Beach Diets appeared successively. The Atkins diet has been described as "one of the most popular fad diets in the United States".

In 1997, the American Heart Association (AHA) "declares war on fad diets [...] to inform the public of misleading weight loss claims".

=== 21st century ===
During the early 2000s, the Paleolithic diet was popularized by Loren Cordain, attracting a largely internet-based following on forums and social media, in part venerating 'primitive' diets and ways of life. This modern fad diet consists of foods thought to mirror those eaten during the Paleolithic era.

The dangerous cotton ball diet surfaced in 2013, prompting dieters to eat up to five cotton balls at a time to lower hunger, leading to intestinal occlusion and potentially death. Aseem Malhotra has promoted a low-carbohydrate fad diet known as the Pioppi diet. It was named by the British Dietetic Association as one of the "top 5 worst celeb diets to avoid in 2018".

A fad diet promoted on social media platforms beginning in the early 2020s was the carnivore diet that involves eating only animal products. There is no clinical evidence that the carnivore diet provides any health benefits. Other fad diets include the lectin-free diet promoted by Steven Gundry, and the pegan diet of Mark Hyman. For people without coeliac disease or a gluten allergy, the gluten-free diet is a fad diet promoted by advocates, such as Gwyneth Paltrow.

== Marketing ==
Most fad diets promote their plans as being derived from religion or science. Fad diets may be completely based on pseudoscience (e.g., "fat-burning" foods or notions of vitalism); most fad diets are marketed or described with exaggerated claims, not sustainable in sound science, about the benefits of eating a certain way or the harms of eating other ways.

Such diets are often endorsed by celebrities or celebrity doctors who style themselves as "gurus" and profit from sales of branded products, books, and public speaking. One sign of commercial fad diets is a requirement to purchase associated products and attend seminars to gain the benefits of the diet.

The audience for these diets is people who want to lose weight quickly or who want to join advocates defined by a diet.

Regardless of their limited evidence base, fad diets are common, with over 1,500 books published each year in the 21st century, with many consumers willing to pay for diet products, making for an industry worth $35 billion per year in the US. About 14–15% of Americans declare having used a fad diet for short-term weight loss.

== Society and culture ==
According to the American Heart Association, a liquid very-low-calorie diet caused at least 60 deaths in 1977.

In Sweden, in 2005, the Atkins diet was at the crux of a controversy, when dietitian Annika Dahlqvist started recommending it to her diabetic patients, which prompted an investigation by the Swedish National Institute of Public Health (Folkhälsoinstitutet).

== List of fad diets ==
Fad diets are a subset of all named or defined diets, typically identified as associated by a founding person or organization, making claims of rapid weight loss.

== See also ==
- Health food
- List of food faddists
- Food trends
