= Max Lugavere =

American film director

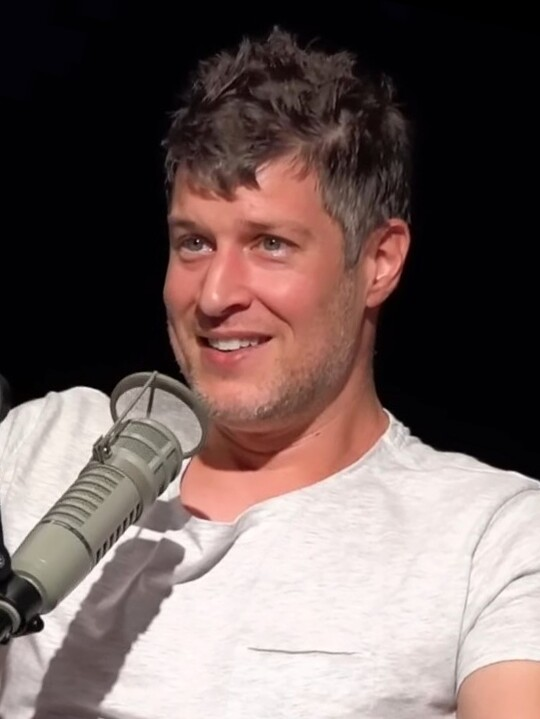
- Lugavere in 2022
- Born: 1982 or 1983; New York City
- Occupations: Health and wellness writer
- Known for: Fringe dietary claims, opposition to seed oils and veganism.

Max Lugavere (born 1982 or 1983) is an American author and filmmaker who has written about diet and brain health. He promotes low-carbohydrate diets that contain high amounts of animal source foods and has claimed that veganism and vegetarianism may increase the risk of dementia. He has been described as an "anti-vegan activist" and is an opponent of seed oils.

== Career ==
Lugavere grew up in New York City and studied filmmaking at the University of Miami. From 2005 to 2011, he was a presenter on Current TV, an independent cable network. He co-hosted the show Max and Jason: Still Up with Jason Silva, where they featured a wide range of current events and stories ranging from illegal immigration to counterfeit IDs. Lugavere and Silva also co-hosted the Pangea Day international multimedia event in 2008.

In 2013, Lugavere created Tribeca Enterprises' first-ever original series, Acting Disruptive, debuting on AOL. Lugavere began researching connections between lifestyle and cognitive function after his mother began showing cognitive decline and testing showed he had genetic variants associated with increased risk of dementia. In 2015, Lugavere switched to a low-carbohydrate high-fat diet.

Lugavere is a presenter for PragerU, a conservative media platform that has been accused of spreading climate change denial.

=== Genius Foods ===
Lugavere's personal research culminated in his first book, Genius Foods: Become Smarter, Happier, and More Productive While Protecting Your Brain for Life which debuted in March 2018. The book, co-authored with Paul Grewal, M.D.discusses the link between diet and brain health. Lugavere promotes a low-carbohydrate diet of grass-fed beef, free-range chicken and pasture-raised or omega-3 enriched eggs with low-carbohydrate fibrous vegetables, extra virgin olive oil and salt. Genius Foods became a New York Times bestseller and was followed by a podcast hosted by Lugavere, The Genius Life.

In 2018, Jonathan Jarry of McGill University's Office for Science and Society analyzed Lugavere's health-related claims in his book, Genius Foods, and podcast, and concluded that Lugavere lacked the credentials to accurately interpret the scientific literature used to substantiate his health claims, and acknowledged Lugavere's business ambitions. Jarry noted that "Lugavere appears like a proponent of common-sense solutions to ill health—better nutrition, exercise and sleep—but it’s only when you start to trust him that he reveals himself to be a naive believer in anything that has a study behind it. His book has received endorsements from people like Dr. Oz and functional medicine proponent Mark Hyman, and this company is telling."

=== Little Empty Boxes ===
Lugavere's mother started showing cognitive declines in 2011, and three years later he began a documentary project called Bread Head, initially launched on the crowd-funding platform Kickstarter. After a decade of development, it was released as Little Empty Boxes in April 2024. The film chronicles his mother’s struggle with dementia and also explores Lugavere's fringe ideas about nutrition. The documentary includes Mark Hyman, Nina Teicholz and Steven Gundry all of whom have been described by film critic Louis Roberts as promoting "fad diets with dubious scientific backing". The documentary argues that breakfast cereal, refined flour, and sugar are detrimental to health and that plant-based diets deny necessary fats that the brain needs. Alex Rudolph of Movie Jawn commented that the documentary lacked empathy for Lugavere's mother and concluded "I felt like I had watched somebody use their loved one's death to sell supplements". The New York Times noted that the film is "strongest when it chronicles [Lugavere's and his mother's] relationship," characterizing the rest of the film as "uneven." On the review aggregator Rotten Tomatoes, there are four critic reviews for the film, all of which are positive.

=== Make America Healthy Again ===
Lugavere appeared as a panelist in a 2024 roundtable discussion led by Senator Ron Johnson titled "American Health and Nutrition: A Second Opinion," which Jarry described as "a masquerade". Other panelists included Jordan Peterson and Vani Hari. The chosen speakers criticized the food pyramid, pharmaceutical industry and seed oils. Lugavere is an opponent of seed oils and ultra-processed foods.

Lugavere suggested that Robert F. Kennedy, Jr. was the most qualified candidate as the new head of the United States Department of Health and Human Services. Lugavere has collaborated with Paul Saladino, an influencer who supports MAGA and an animal-based diet. In 2025, Saladino was featured in a video with Lugavere while consuming raw milk and honey shots, during which Lugavere commented, "We’re about to trigger so many food scientists".

=== Criticism of whole grains ===
Contrary to evidence-based dietary advice, Lugavere has criticized whole grain consumption due to their glycemic index, commenting "a slice of whole grain bread has a higher glycemic index (the measurement of how quickly a carbohydrate spikes your blood sugar) than that of table sugar!". He has described whole grain bread as an ultra-processed food "masquerading as a staple". In an interview with Steven Gundry, Lugavere stated, "I'm not an advocate of grain consumption because I think grains are essentially cattle feed. They don’t offer any real nutritional value".

=== Opposition to veganism ===
Lugavere has asserted that vegans are deprived of essential nutrients found in animal source foods. He has argued against veganism from a cognitive perspective, claiming historically it did not lead to the evolution of the human brain. He has suggested from the archaeological record that cooked meat allowed easier access to fatty acids like DHA.

Lugavere has been described as an "anti-vegan activist" by Joseph A. Schwarcz. He promotes a high-fat, meat-heavy diet and has been described as spending his time on social media complaining about "vegan propaganda". Lugavere has blamed plant-based and vegan diets for increasing risk of dementia and mental health problems. He has argued that eggs have been unfairly demonized by governments, despite containing choline which he says has been linked to lower dementia risk. Lugavere also recommends regular consumption of red meat for mental health.

== Selected publications ==
- Genius Foods: Become Smarter, Happier, and More Productive While Protecting Your Brain for Life (HarperWave, 2018) ISBN 9780062562890
- The Genius Life: Heal Your Mind, Strengthen Your Body, and Become Extraordinary (HarperCollins, 2020) ISBN 9780062892829
- Genius Kitchen: Over 100 Easy and Delicious Recipes to Make Your Brain Sharp, Body Strong, and Taste Buds Happy (Harper, 2022) ISBN 9780063022959
