= Pangea Day =

2008 international multimedia event

Pangea Day is an international multimedia event conducted on May 10, 2008. Cairo, Kigali, London, Los Angeles, Mumbai and Rio de Janeiro were linked to produce a 4-hour program of films, music, and speakers. The program was broadcast live across the globe from 1800 to 2200 UTC, culminating in a global drum circle, symbolizing the common heartbeat of the world. According to the festival organizers, "Pangea Day plans to use the power of film to bring the world a little closer together."

Pangea Day originated in 2006 when documentary filmmaker Jehane Noujaim won the TED Prize. Jehane wished to use film to bring the world together.

Pangea refers to the supercontinent from which all current continents initially separated. It serves as a reminder of the "connectedness" or unitary nature of all people on Planet Earth.

== Goals ==
- Bring together millions of people from all over the world in a unique shared experience.
- Use the power of film to create a better understanding of one another.
- Form a global community striving for a better future.

== Live broadcast locations ==
Pangea Day was broadcast live from seven cities:

- Cairo - The Pyramids
- Kigali - Jali Gardens
- London - Somerset House
- Los Angeles - Sony Pictures Studios
- Mumbai - National Centre for the Performing Arts
- Rio de Janeiro - Morro da Urca
- Buenos Aires - [KONEX Theater]

In the United States, Current TV was the exclusive, English-language broadcaster.

== Featured Films ==
- A Thousand Words directed by Ted Chung
- More directed by Mark Osborne
- L'Homme Sans Tete directed by Juan Diego Solanas
- Happy Together directed by Sam Nozik
- Dreaming of Zhejiang directed by Marineta Mak Kritikou

== Global partner ==
Nokia was Pangea Day's premier global partner. In addition to providing financial support, Nokia sent video enabled devices to film schools and programs in disadvantaged areas and conflict zones, and to UNHCR refugee camps. Some of the films made in these locations were included in the Pangea Day broadcast.

== Key participants ==
=== Hosts ===
- June Arunga
- Lisa Ling
- Max Lugavere
- Jason Silva

=== Advisory board ===
- J. J. Abrams
- Lawrence Bender
- Nancy Buirski
- Alan Cumming
- Richard Curtis
- Ami Dar
- Cameron Diaz
- Matthew Freud
- Bob Geldof
- Goldie Hawn
- Jim Hornthal
- Judy McGrath
- Pat Mitchell
- Vik Muniz
- Clare Munn
- Mira Nair
- Dr. Tero Ojanperä
- Eboo Patel
- Alexander Payne
- Richard Rogers
- Meg Ryan
- Deborah Scranton
- Paul Simon
- Jeffrey Skoll
- Sir Martin Sorrell
- Philippe Starck
- Dave Stewart
- Yossi Vardi
- Kevin Wall
- Forest Whitaker
- will.i.am
- Paul Zilk

=== Speakers ===
- Christiane Amanpour
- Bassam Aramin
- Karen Armstrong
- June Arunga
- Ali Abu Awwad
- Ishmael Beah
- Donald Brown
- Assaad Chaftari
- Muhieddine Chehab
- Robi Damelin
- Jonathan Harris
- Robert Kurzban
- Lisa Ling
- Max Lugavere
- Khaled Aboul Naga
- Queen Noor of Jordan
- Eboo Patel
- Carolyn Porco
- Jean-Paul Samputu
- Yonathan Shapira
- Jason Silva

=== Musicians ===
- Dave Stewart
- Gilberto Gil
- Hypernova
- Rokia Traoré
