= June Arunga =

Kenyan economist

- Born: c. 1982 (age 42–43); Nakuru, Kenya
- Education: University of Buckingham
- Occupation: Economist

June Akinyi Arunga (born c. 1982 in Nakuru) is a Kenyan economist and founder and CEO of Open Quest Media LLC. In 2011 she was named by Forbes Magazine as one of its 20 Youngest Powerful Women in Africa. The previous year, in 2010, she was included in the 100 Most Creative People in Business by Fast Company. She is a founding partner, and was Director of Corporate Affairs, of Black Star Line SA: a technology solution provider in the fields of cell-phone based payments and money transfer with a strong focus on the African market. She remains an equity partner. She is an advisor to a variety of start-up efforts with a technology bent, serves on the boards of several international NGOs, and through Open Quest Media Foundation takes an active interest in the confluence of technology, expanding democratic freedoms and entrepreneurialism.

Arunga has featured in four documentaries exploring trade, migration, property and wealth in Africa.

== Education ==
June Arunga attended the Kenya High School and graduated from the law school of the University of Buckingham (England).

== Documentaries and Multimedia ==
In the 18-minute documentary Africa's Ultimate Resource (2003), June Arunga interviewed several African immigrants and talks about why educated people are leaving Africa. Arunga wrote, produced, and presented this documentary. Globalisation is Good (2003) by Swedish economic historian Johan Norberg features June Arunga as a young advocate for a reduction of trade barriers in Africa. In The Devil's Footpath (2004) June Arunga travels down through Africa, from Cairo to Cape Town, on a 5000-mile, six-week, soul-searching journey through six conflict-riven countries that span the continent, and comprise 'The Devil's Footpath'. Africa: Who Is to Blame? was produced and aired by BBC World in 2005. It features June Arunga and former Ghanaian president Jerry Rawlings undertaking to answer the question of who is to blame for Africa's many economic and political troubles. To quote the blurb for the program: 'Corporate greed and vestigial colonialism are Africa's worst enemies—or is homegrown leadership responsible for the continent's troubles? This program explores that dichotomous question from the vantage point of former Ghanaian president Jerry Rawlings and Kenyan law student June Arunga, who undertake a voyage of discovery through Ghana, Tanzania, and Rwanda. Visiting a struggling fishing village, a tribal hunting ground, an AIDS treatment center, an African-owned gold mine, and an eerily preserved site of genocidal slaughter, the program eloquently documents Rawlings' and Arunga's interaction with the socioeconomic dilemmas and everyday realities of African life.' On 10 May 2008, June Arunga, Lisa Ling, Max Lugavere, and Jason Silva hosted Pangea Day. This was a global multimedia event that was beamed from Cairo, Kigali, London, Los Angeles, Mumbai and Rio de Janeiro to an audience of millions around the world in seven languages. The 4-hour program of films, music and speakers included Queen Noor of Jordan, CNN's Christiane Amanpour, Dave Stewart and friends, Gilberto Gil, and Iranian rock phenoms Hypernova.
