= Liver King =

Fitness social media influencer

- Born: Brian Michael Johnson; March 2, 1978 (age 48); Ceiba, Puerto Rico
- Education: Texas Tech University (BS)
- Occupations: Internet personality; businessman
- Years active: 2020–present
- Known for: Promoting an "ancestral lifestyle" and consuming raw, unprocessed organ meats, particularly liver
- Spouse: Barbara (m. 2004)
- Children: 2

TikTok information
- Page: liverking
- Followers: 6.1 million

YouTube information
- Channel: Liver King
- Subscribers: 1.22 million
- Views: 87.3 million
- Last updated: June 17, 2026
- Website: liverking.com

Brian Michael Johnson (born March 2, 1978), known by his online pseudonym Liver King, is an American internet personality, fitness influencer, and businessman. He is known for promoting what he calls an "ancestral lifestyle", claiming it was responsible for his bodybuilder physique, and included the consumption of raw organ meats, a practice for which Johnson has received criticism from medical professionals. Though he claimed to not rely on anabolic steroids or other supplements, it was revealed in 2022 that Johnson had been spending more than $11,000 a month on steroids to achieve his physique. In a 2025 Netflix documentary, Untold: The Liver King, Johnson denounced and criticized the carnivore diet and his promotion of it.

== Early life ==
According to Johnson's website, his family was originally from Oklahoma, but Brian was born at Naval Station Roosevelt Roads in Ceiba, Puerto Rico, while his father was serving in the United States Air Force. Shortly afterward, the family relocated to Lackland Air Force Base in San Antonio, Texas. Brian's father, Philip D. Johnson, died suddenly while Brian was still an infant. He and his brother remained in San Antonio through a military-assisted living program and were raised by their mother.

Johnson claims that he was active in sports growing up, particularly BMX, but was undersized for his age, and had a bad speech impediment that required extensive speech therapy. He stated that he was bullied frequently, and claims that he was knocked unconscious after a bully punched him in the back of the head on the first day of middle school.

He attended Texas Tech University and received a bachelor's degree in biochemistry.

== Career ==
Following his degree, Johnson moved to Houston to pursue a job as a pharmaceutical sales representative. and later was a stakeholder in his wife's dental practice. In 2021, he went viral on social media for promoting what he refers to as an "ancestral lifestyle", which is based around nine "ancestral tenets". This includes the shunning of modern conveniences, performing taxing physical exercise routines and, most prominently, consuming large amounts of raw unprocessed organs and meat, especially liver. His moniker "Liver King" is derived from this practice. Since 2015, Johnson and his wife Barbara have been selling fitness supplements online, with the Liver King persona promoting the business.

Medical professionals criticized Johnson for promoting potentially dangerous misinformation and giving his followers the impression that they can also achieve an ideal body with supposedly natural methods. The meat-rich diet Johnson recommended was high in saturated fat, which is associated with an increased risk of heart disease and high cholesterol levels, and may also result in digestive issues.

Despite repeatedly denying having ever used anabolic steroids to attain his physique, a leak of private e-mails in late 2022 revealed that he had spent over $11,000 a month on steroids, and was taking 16 vials of performance-enhancing drugs each month, including five steroids and one synthetic protein hormone. He then apologized for misleading his viewers about his "pharmacological intervention" in a YouTube video. In the video, in which Johnson admitted to taking around 120 mg of testosterone per week, he added that there is "a time and place" for such interventions to be made.

Johnson co-owns the supplement company Heart & Soil with animal-based diet proponent and MD Paul Saladino.

== Legal issues ==
Following the revelation that Johnson had taken steroids and other substances for years, some of his followers filed a lawsuit, accusing Johnson of deception and demanding $25 million in compensation. The lawsuit was later discontinued.

On June 24, 2025, the Austin Police Department arrested Johnson on a charge of terroristic threat, a Class B misdemeanor. The police department confirmed Johnson was arrested for repeatedly threatening physical harm against podcaster Joe Rogan on his Instagram profile and traveling to Austin, Texas, where Rogan lives, while continuing to make such statements. Johnson's use of steroids had previously been the subject of one of Rogan's podcast episodes. He was released on $20,000 bail later that same evening and was ordered to neither contact nor physically approach Rogan or his family and also undergo a mental health evaluation.

== In the media ==
Johnson is the subject of a 2025 Netflix documentary, Untold: The Liver King. Director Joe Perlman stated that he had taken a personal interest in Johnson’s story and what the influencer was willing to do to keep and expand his social media following. Writing for Time, Charlotte Lytton stated that the documentary was not particularly critical of Johnson, and doubted the sincerity of the fitness influencer. Rhik Samadder of The Guardian wrote that Untold was witty and "frequently hilarious" at the cost of Johnson, and wished that the documentary had a longer running time. In the Netflix documentary, Johnson denounced the carnivore diet and his promotion of it.

== See also ==
- Paleolithic diet
- Bryan Johnson
