= Seed oil misinformation =

Medical controversy

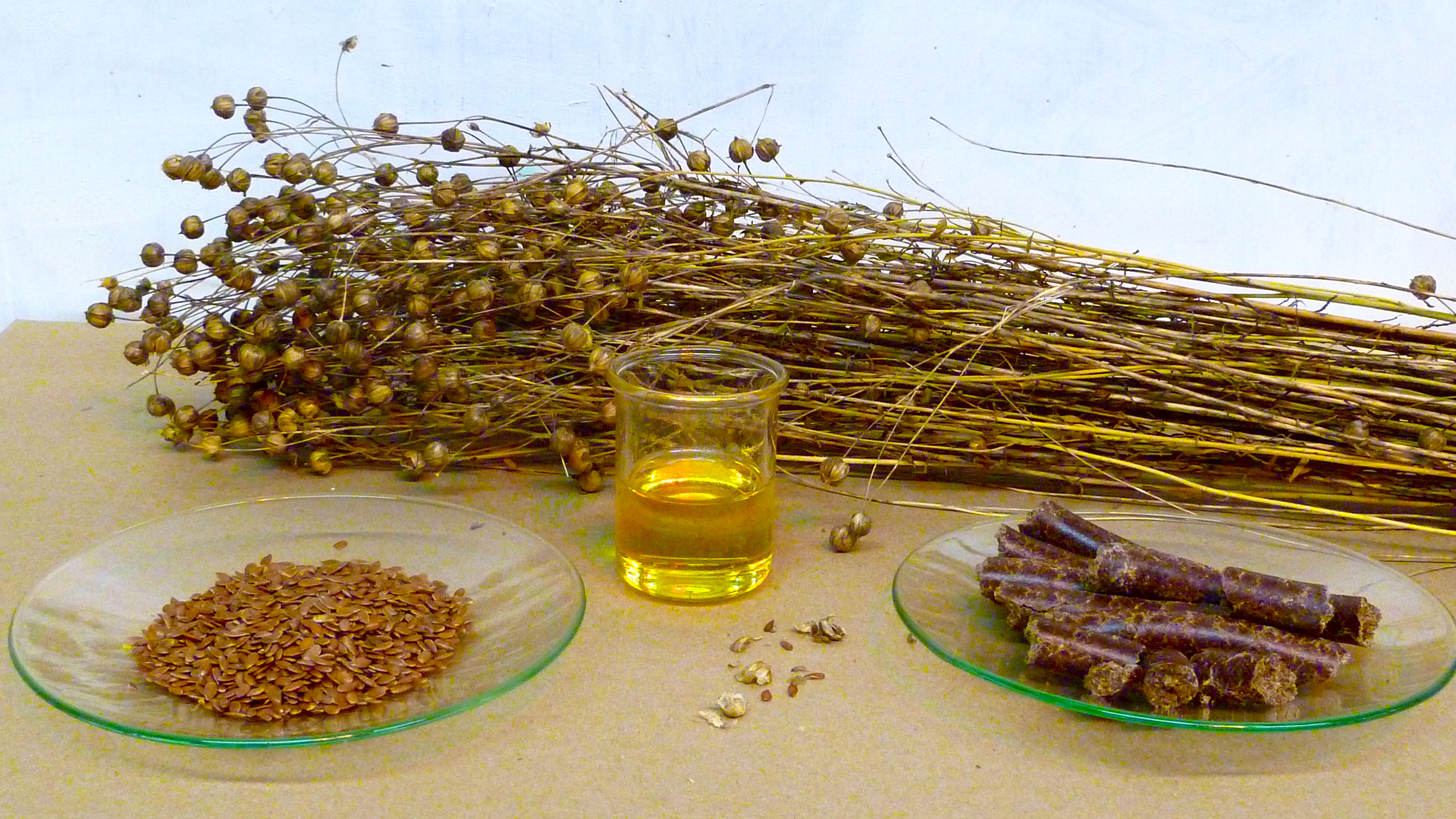
Flax, flax seeds, linseed oil, and linseed cake

Since 2018, the health effects of consuming certain processed vegetable oils, or seed oils have been subject to misinformation in popular and social media. The trend grew in 2020 after podcaster and comedian Joe Rogan interviewed fad diet proponent Paul Saladino about the carnivore diet. Saladino made several claims about the health effects of vegetable fats.

The theme of the misinformation is that seed oils are the root cause of most diseases of affluence, including heart disease, cancer, diabetes, and liver spots. These claims are not based on evidence, but have nevertheless become popular on the political right. Critics cite a specific "hateful eight" oils that constitute "seed oils": canola, corn, cottonseed, soybean, sunflower, safflower, grapeseed, and rice bran.

Although critics raise concerns about processing, omega-6 fatty acids, and linoleic acid, scientific evidence finds these oils safe and beneficial, with omega-6s linked to lower cardiovascular risk and no consistent evidence of increased inflammation, cancer, or chronic disease. Claims that seed oils are harmful are not supported by clinical or epidemiological data, and some health organizations warn that reducing omega-6 intake could worsen heart health.

Consumer vegetable oils are generally recognized as safe for human consumption by the United States FDA.

== Origins and scientific evaluation ==
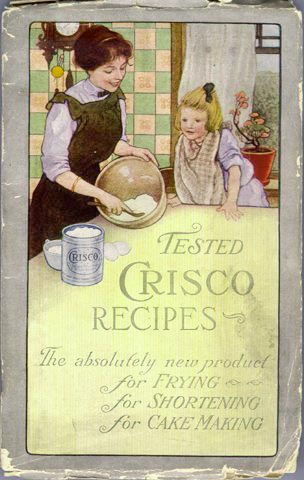
Cover of the original Crisco cookbook, 1912

Seed oils are oils extracted from the seed, rather than the pulp or fruit, of a plant. Seed oils are characterized by the industrial process used to extract the oil from the seed and a high content of polyunsaturated fatty acids (PUFAs). Critics' "hateful eight" oils consist of canola, corn, cottonseed, soy, sunflower, safflower, grapeseed, and rice bran oils, which are creations of industrialization in the early twentieth century. In the United States, cottonseed oil was developed and marketed by Procter & Gamble as the creamed shortening Crisco in 1911. The extracted oil was refined and partially hydrogenated to give a solid at room temperature and thus mimic natural lard, and canned under nitrogen gas.

=== Industrial solvents ===
Critics of seed oils often point to the health hazards of the solvents used in the industrial process of generating vegetable oils. Hexane, which can be neurotoxic, is extremely effective at oil extraction. Thus, it is often quoted as a danger when consuming vegetable oils as it can be found in finished oils in trace amounts. The United States Environmental Protection Agency studied the toxicity of hexane extensively in the 1980s. The studies found that the hexane used in industrial processes was safe for consumption and did not cause nerve damage.

=== Omega-6 fatty acids ===
A comparison of the composition of different types of vegetable oils and animal fats. Oils from seeds have the lowest percentage of saturated fat, and range widely in their composition of omega-3, omega-6, and omega-9.

Sunflower, corn, and soybean oil have a higher proportion of omega-6 fatty acids than oils from fish, walnuts, flaxseed, and rapeseed (canola). Omega-6 fatty acids constitute a growing proportion of Americans' fat intake. They have been hypothesized to contribute to several negative health effects, including inflammation and immunodeficiency, but most cardiovascular health researchers believe the data shows that omega-6 fatty acids are safe and healthy for humans. In fact, omega-6 fatty acids are significantly associated with a lowered risk of cardiovascular disease, and the American Heart Association has stated that a reduction in omega-6 fatty acids could lead to an increase, not reduction, in cardiovascular disease. Research indicates that consumption of omega-6 fatty acids has no significant effect on inflammatory bowel disease.

==== Linoleic acid ====
Opponents of seed oils have argued that linoleic acid, an essential fatty acid found in seed oils such as safflower oil and sunflower oil increases chronic disease risk such as cardiovascular disease, cancer and systemic inflammation. This idea is not supported by data from recent clinical trials or long-term epidemiological studies. It has been shown that higher in vivo circulating and tissue levels of linoleic acid are associated with lower risk of major cardiovascular events. A 2025 review of human outcome data concluded that linoleic acid from seed oils does not increase chronic disease risk. The review also noted that the human research evidence shows that linoleic acid intake does not affect inflammation or increase inflammatory biomarkers.

The World Cancer Research Fund and Cancer Council Australia have stated that there is no scientific evidence that consuming seed oils increases cancer risk.

==== Omega-6:omega-3 ratio ====
A 2024 review stated that dietary recommendations should not be made based on the omega-6:omega-3 ratio, but rather on their absolute dietary intake levels. The omega-6:omega-3 ratio is calculated by accounting for all of the omega-6 fatty acids in the diet or blood divided by the sum of all omega-3 fatty acids. Concern about a high omega-6:omega-3 ratio was based on the competition between linoleic acid and alpha-linolenic acid for desaturation enzymes, and because metabolites of omega-6 fatty acids were considered to be pro-inflammatory.

However, there is insufficient evidence in humans that omega-6 fats are pro-inflammatory and that omega-3 fats are anti-inflammatory. In contrast, higher omega-6 levels are associated with lower inflammatory status, indicating that intake of omega-6 fats is not a dietary concern, and that relatively low intake of dietary omega-3 fats may lead to inflammation. Accordingly, use of the omega-6:omega-3 ratio has been rejected as an inflammation biomarker by health agencies worldwide. Numerous health and scientific organizations recommend intake of omega-6 seed oils as part of a healthy diet to replace sources of saturated fats, such as in palm and coconut oils, butter, tallow, and lard.

== Political connotations ==
Opposition to seed oils has been associated with the political right. Maya Vinokour, an assistant professor at NYU, writing for Jacobin, described the belief as "lifestyle fascism" and "right-wing masculinist discourse".

Robert F. Kennedy Jr., United States Secretary of Health and Human Services since 2025, has expressed opposition to seed oils. In the 2024 U.S. presidential election, Kennedy ran as an independent candidate and campaigned on health-related misinformation. In his speech suspending his campaign and endorsing that of Donald Trump, he blamed several health conditions on processed foods' inclusion of seed oils. Later that day, Kennedy appeared alongside Trump to declare that the latter would "Make America Healthy Again," endorsing Trump's health and food policies.

US vice president JD Vance has also stated that he does not cook with seed oils.

In response to the growing political opposition from the Trump administration's MAHA movement, agricultural trade groups and industry lobbyists have begun campaigning to defend the safety of seed oils to lawmakers and food corporations.
