= Zalmay Khalilzad =

American diplomat (born 1951)

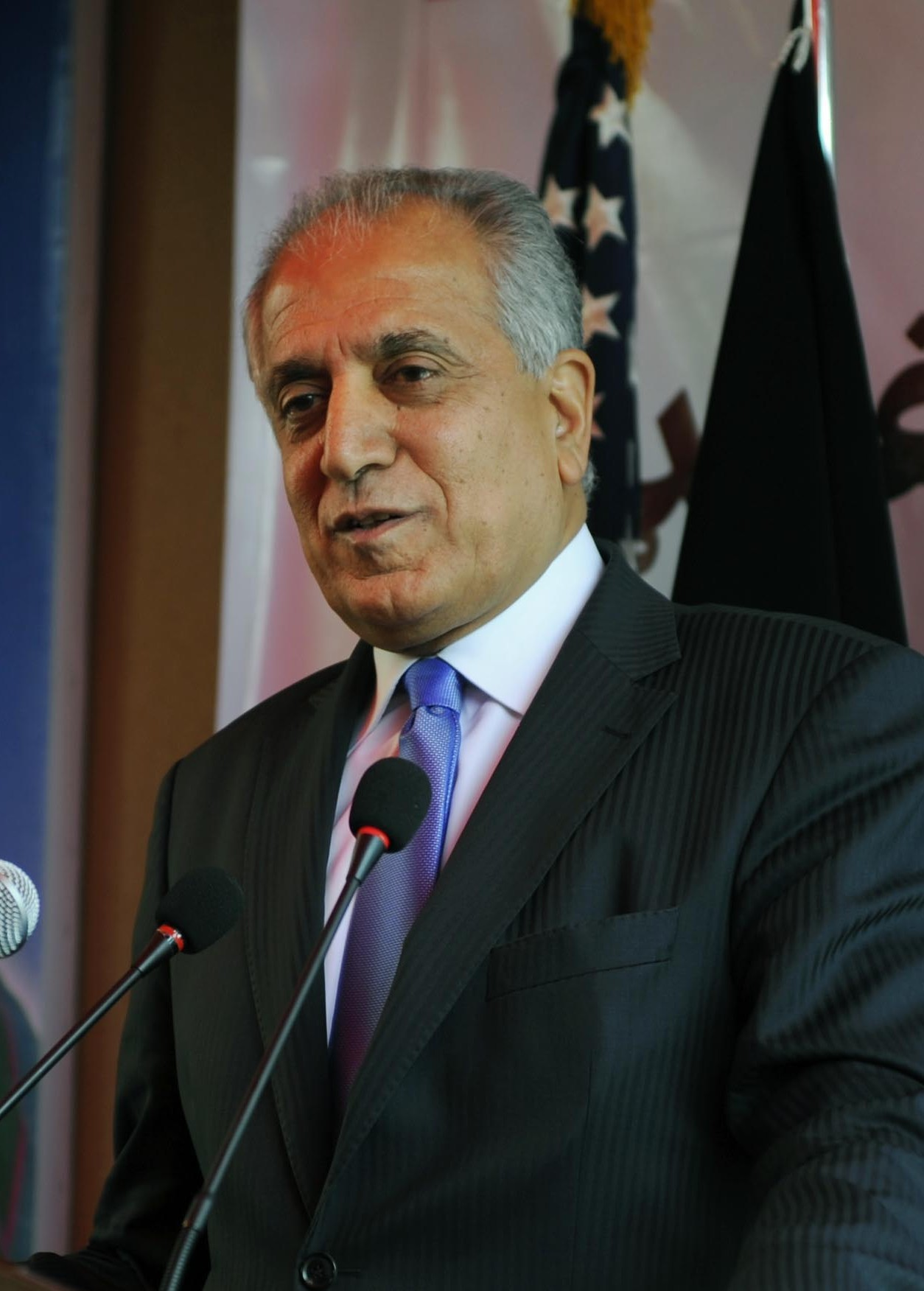
- Khalilzad in 2011

U.S. Special Representative for Afghanistan Reconciliation
- In office September 21, 2018 – October 19, 2021
- President: Donald Trump; Joe Biden
- Preceded by: Position established
- Succeeded by: Thomas West

26th United States Ambassador to the United Nations
- In office April 30, 2007 – January 22, 2009
- President: George W. Bush; Barack Obama
- Preceded by: John Bolton
- Succeeded by: Susan Rice

United States Ambassador to Iraq
- In office June 21, 2005 – March 26, 2007
- President: George W. Bush
- Preceded by: John Negroponte
- Succeeded by: Ryan Crocker

15th United States Ambassador to Afghanistan
- In office September 2, 2004 – June 20, 2005
- President: George W. Bush
- Preceded by: Robert Finn
- Succeeded by: Ronald E. Neumann

Personal details
- Born: Zalmay Mamozy Khalilzad; March 22, 1951 (age 75) Balkh, Afghanistan
- Spouse: Cheryl Benard
- Children: 2
- Education: American University of Beirut (BA, MA); University of Chicago (PhD)

Zalmay Mamozy Khalilzad (born March 22, 1951) is an American diplomat and foreign policy expert. He served as the U.S. special representative for Afghanistan reconciliation from 2018 to 2021. He also served as United States ambassador to the United Nations, serving in the role from 2007 to 2009. He previously served in the Bush administration as ambassador to Afghanistan from 2004 to 2005 and Ambassador to Iraq from 2005 to 2007.

Raised in the Afghan capital of Kabul, Khalilzad came to the United States as a high school exchange student, and later received his doctorate at the University of Chicago. During the Reagan Administration, Khalilzad served in the Department of State, where he advised on the U.S. response to the Soviet–Afghan War. Khalilzad later served as a counselor at the Center for Strategic and International Studies (CSIS) and as president of Gryphon Partners and Khalilzad Associates, an international business consulting firm based in Washington, D.C.

Khalilzad was rumored to be a potential candidate in the 2014 Afghan presidential election but ultimately declined to run. In 2017, he was considered for secretary of state by President Donald Trump. Khalilzad was appointed by Trump to serve as special representative for Afghanistan reconciliation on September 5, 2018, remaining in the position under President Joe Biden until October 18, 2021. In this position, Khalilzad helped broker the US–Taliban deal and facilitating the final United States withdrawal from Afghanistan.

== Early life and education ==
While his parents hailed from Laghman Province, Khalilzad was born in Balkh near Mazar-i-Sharif, Afghanistan, and grew up in the country's capital, Kabul. He is an ethnic Pashtun from the Noorzai tribe. Khalilzad began his education at the public Ghazi Lycée school in Kabul.

Khalilzad first spent time in the United States as a high school exchange student with AFS Intercultural Programs in Ceres, California. Later, he attained his bachelor's and master's degrees from the American University of Beirut in Lebanon. Khalilzad received his doctorate at the University of Chicago, where he studied closely with Albert Wohlstetter, a prominent nuclear deterrence thinker and strategist. Wohlstetter provided Khalilzad with contacts within the government and RAND. Khalilzad has contributed at least 28 papers to RAND Corporation.

== Early career ==
From 1979 to 1989, Khalilzad served as an Assistant Professor of Political Science at the Columbia University School of International and Public Affairs. During this period, he worked closely with Zbigniew Brzezinski, a key architect of Operation Cyclone, the U.S. initiative to support the Afghan mujahideen resisting the Soviet invasion of Afghanistan.

In 1984, Khalilzad joined the U.S. State Department on a one-year Council on Foreign Relations fellowship, serving as an adviser to the Bureau of Near Eastern and South Asian Affairs under Assistant Secretary Richard W. Murphy.

From 1985 to 1989, he held senior roles in the Reagan administration, advising on Afghanistan and broader regional policy. He served on the Policy Planning Staff and was the State Department’s special adviser on Afghanistan to Under Secretary of State Michael H. Armacost. In these roles, he contributed to U.S. efforts to support Afghan resistance to Soviet occupation. From 1990 to 1992, he continued in government under President George H. W. Bush as Deputy Under Secretary of Defense for Policy Planning. Secondary accounts describe him as one of the drafters of the 1992 Defense Planning Guidance later dubbed the ‘Wolfowitz Doctrine’.

Between 1993 and 2000, Khalilzad directed strategy, doctrine, and force structure studies at the RAND Corporation. He helped establish RAND’s Center for Middle Eastern Studies and the periodical Strategic Appraisal. His publications during this time included influential monographs such as The United States and a Rising China and From Containment to Global Leadership? America's Role After the Cold War. While at RAND, he also briefly consulted for Cambridge Energy Research Associates on a risk analysis for Unocal—now part of Chevron Corporation—regarding the proposed 1,400 km, US$2-billion Trans-Afghanistan Pipeline project from Turkmenistan through Afghanistan to Pakistan.

=== Support for U.S. global leadership ===
In the mid-1990s, Khalilzad authored several works advocating the importance of sustained U.S. global leadership. His analysis of potential geopolitical instability resulting from a decline in American influence has been widely cited in academic and competitive policy debate contexts.

Khalilzad was also a signatory to the Project for the New American Century’s January 26, 1998 letter to President Bill Clinton, which urged the administration to pursue a comprehensive strategy—diplomatic, political, and military—to remove Saddam Hussein from power.

== Views ==
=== American politics ===
Khalilzad has been described as a "lifelong Republican", though he did not support Donald Trump's 2016 presidential campaign.

=== United States' role in the world ===
Khalilzad has sometimes been characterized as a neoconservative, with one profile in The Guardian in 2006 characterizing him as "combin[ing] the commitment of an American neocon with the cultural sensitivity of his Islamic background." At times, Khalilzad has embraced the label, authoring an article titled "The Neoconservative Case for Negotiating With Iran" in Politico magazine in 2006.

In 1995, Khalilzad articulated his views regarding the appropriate role of the United States in the Post-Cold War period:

The United States should be willing to use force if necessary for this purpose. There are currently two regions whose control by a hostile power could pose a global challenge: East Asia and Europe. The Persian Gulf is critically important for a different reason—its oil resources are vital for the world economy. In the long term, the relative importance of various regions can change. A region that is critical to American interests now might become less important, while some other region might gain in importance."

Regarding U.S. military preeminence, Khalilzad argued in favor of maintaining a sufficiently strong military to be able to embark in "two major regional contingencies nearly simultaneously":

For the foreseeable future, this means having the capability for fighting two major regional contingencies nearly simultaneously, e.g., Korea and the Gulf. The United States should also acquire increased capabilities for occasional intervention in lesser regional conflicts, such as humanitarian relief operations, and for countering weapons of mass destruction and ballistic and cruise missiles. For the longer term, it should consider moving toward sizing its forces to be able to defeat the plausible military challenges to critical American interests that might be posed by the two next most powerful military forces in the world—which are not allied with the United States.

=== Afghanistan ===
==== Taliban ====
In June 2001, Khalilzad argued that the "United States must act now to weaken the Taliban and stem the spread of Talibanism." In a letter, Khalilzad endorsed the following policies to weaken the Taliban's control over Afghanistan:

1. change the balance of power by offering assistance to the foes of the Taliban;
2. oppose the Taliban ideology—giving air time over the Voice of America to Taliban opponents and moderate Islamic leaders;
3. press Pakistan to withdraw its support;
4. aid victims of the Taliban;
5. support moderate Afghans through helping to convene a grand assembly to select a broad transitional government; and
6. elevate the importance of Afghanistan at home.

==== Peace Process in Afghanistan ====
In June 2009, Khalilzad stated the following at a UC Berkeley event:

I believe and I've told president Karzai few month ago, because he is talking a lot about reconciliation, which is conceptually an absolute necessity, every war must end, but circumstance must be created for that wish to be successful. I've told him [to] get your house in order first, get the corruption issue dealt with, get governance improved, get services improved, then people would say `ahaa ... i want to be on this side, it looks like it is a better side, the side that is producing resolve.' But if they see your judges are corrupt, and your governors are not providing any services, initially people would think `why should I die for this, I'm going to become neutral`, or worse if the other side is providing more security, let's say, it [sic] will be even more difficult."

=== North Korea ===
In a published 1993 paper, he advocated for "trade sanctions" against North Korea, "enhancing U.S. and South Korean military readiness", and "direct military attacks".

Use of force by a U.S.—allied coalition has better prospects for achieving the U.S. objective, either by setting back the program or by producing a more compliant North Korea—depending on how much and how effectively the force is applied. However, given the risk of triggering a second Korean war, it is unclear whether the South Koreans or Japanese could be induced to agree.

== George W. Bush administration (2001-2009) ==
=== U.S. Ambassador to Afghanistan ===
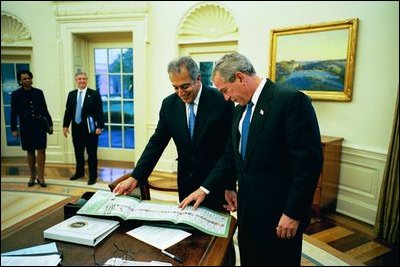
Khalilzad presenting President George W. Bush a ballot from the first democratic election in Afghanistan on October 18, 2004.

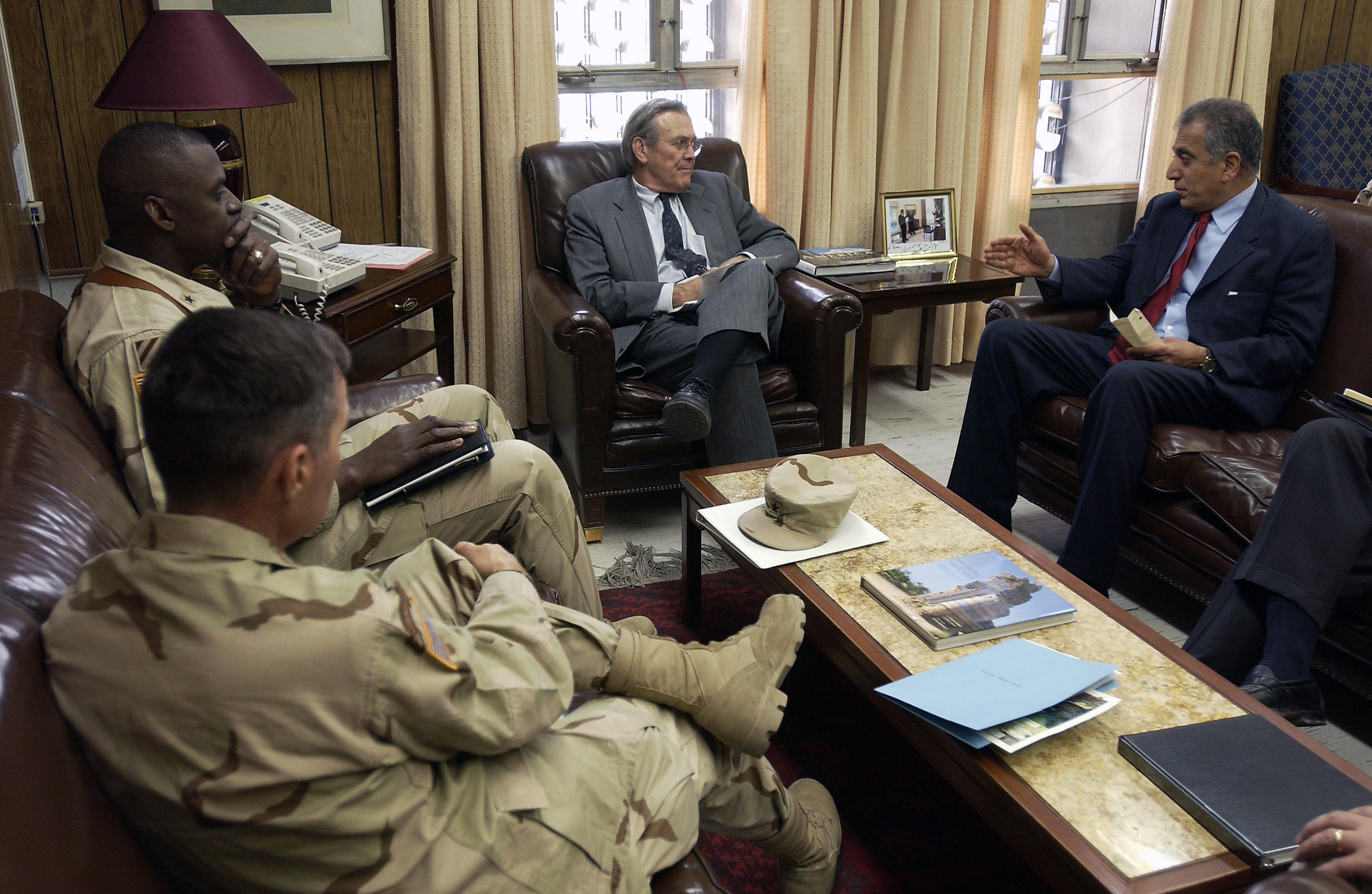
Khalilzad conversing with Secretary of Defense Donald Rumsfeld accompanied by Lieutenant General David Barno and Brigadier General Lloyd Austin, during Rumsfeld visit to Kandahar, Afghanistan on February 26, 2004.

In 2001, President George W. Bush asked Khalilzad to head his transition team for the Department of Defense, and Khalilzad briefly served as counselor to Secretary of Defense Donald Rumsfeld. In May 2001, national security adviser Condoleezza Rice announced Khalilzad's appointment as special assistant to the president and senior director for Southwest Asia, Near East, and North African affairs on the National Security Council. In December 2002, Bush appointed Khalilzad to the position of ambassador at large for free Iraqis with the task of coordinating "preparations for a post-Saddam Hussein Iraq."

After the terrorist attacks of 9/11, Bush came to rely on Khalilzad's Afghanistan expertise. Khalilzad was involved in the early stages of planning to overthrow the Taliban and on December 31, 2001, he was selected as Bush's special presidential envoy for Afghanistan. He served in that position until November 2003, when he was appointed to serve as US ambassador to Afghanistan. Khalilzad held that position from November 2003 until June 2005.

During that time, he oversaw the drafting of the constitution of Afghanistan, was involved with the country's first elections and helped to organize the first meeting of Afghanistan's Loya Jirga (traditional grand assembly). At the June 2002 Loya Jirga to select the Head of State, representatives of the US convinced the former king of Afghanistan, 87-year-old Mohammed Zahir Shah, to withdraw from consideration even though a majority of Loya Jirga delegates supported him. That move angered Pashtuns, who were concerned with the disproportionate power of the Northern Alliance in the Karzai government. During Khalilzad's tenure as ambassador, the new Afghan president, Hamid Karzai, consulted closely with him on a regular basis about political decisions, and the two dined together regularly. In 2004 and 2005, he was also involved in helping with the establishment of the American University of Afghanistan (AUAF), which is the first American-style higher learning educational institution in Afghanistan. In 2016, the Friends of the American University of Afghanistan presented him with the International Public Service Award.

=== U.S. Ambassador to Iraq ===
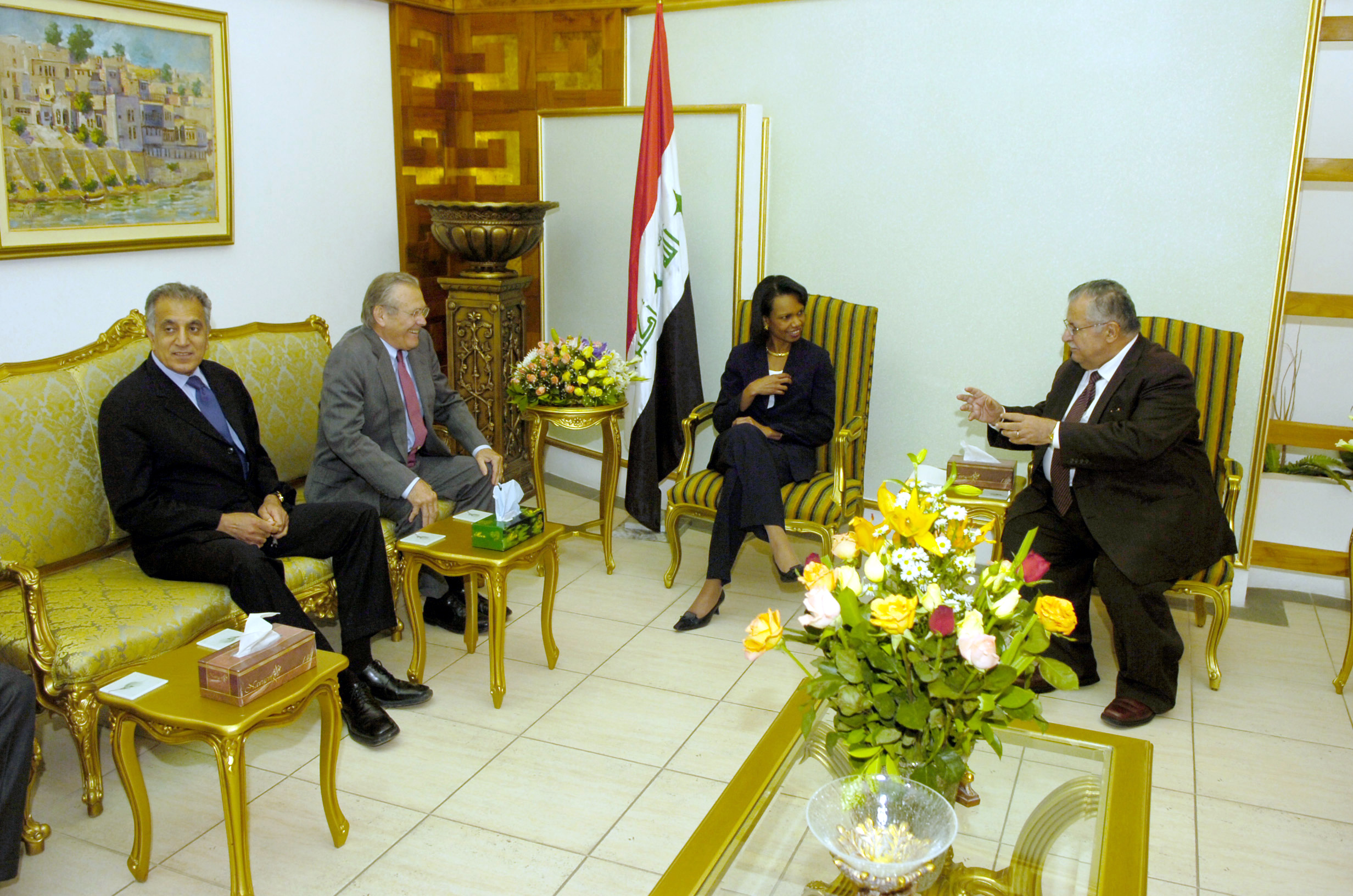
Khalilzad with Donald Rumsfeld, Condoleezza Rice, and Iraqi President Jalal Talabani in April 2006.

Khalilzad began his job as the U.S. ambassador to Iraq on June 21, 2005. He was credited for helping negotiate compromises which allowed the ratification of the Constitution of Iraq in October 2005. Khalilzad also worked to ensure that the December 2005 elections ran smoothly and played a substantial role in forming the first post-Saddam government. Khalilzad also helped establish the American University of Iraq, in Sulaimaniya, and sits on its board of regents.

In comparison to his predecessors, Paul Bremer and John Negroponte, in Baghdad, Khalilzad was considered a success as an ambassador and credited with bringing a cultural sophistication and human touch to the job that helped connect with Iraqis.

Khalilzad was one of the first high-level administration officials to warn that sectarian violence was overtaking the insurgency as the top threat to Iraq's stability. After the Al Askari Mosque bombing, in February 2006, he warned that spreading sectarian violence might lead to civil war and possibly to even a broader conflict, involving neighboring countries. Khalilzad sought political solutions to the problem of sectarianism, and in particular, he worked to integrate the balance of power between Iraq's three main ethnic groups to head off growing the growing Sunni violence.

Khalilzad's term as ambassador ended on March 26, 2007. He was replaced by Ryan Crocker, a career diplomat and former U.S. ambassador to Pakistan.

=== U.S. Ambassador to the United Nations ===
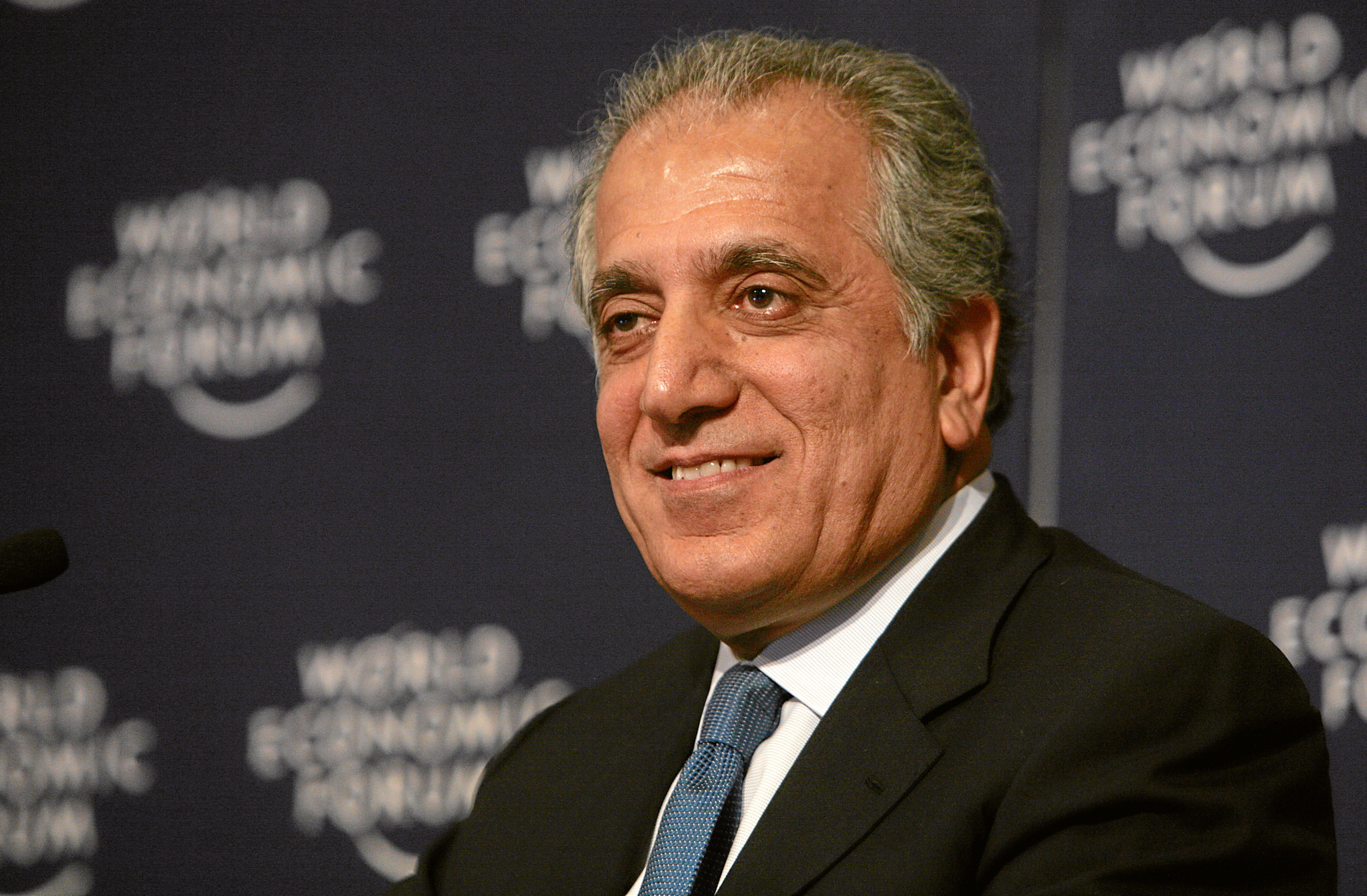
Khalilzad at the 2008 World Economic Forum, in Switzerland, attending the plenary session; 'Understanding Iran's Foreign Policy' on January 26, 2008.

On February 12, 2007, the White House submitted Khalilzad's nomination to the Senate to become the U.S. ambassador to the United Nations. He was unanimously confirmed by the Democratic-controlled US Senate on March 29, 2007. That marked a strong contrast to Khalilzad's predecessor, John R. Bolton, whose often-controversial rhetoric caused him to fail to be confirmed by the Senate but obtained a recess appointment.

Colleagues at the UN noted that Khalilzad has a different style from Bolton and was more conciliatory.

In November 2007, Khalilzad charged that Iran was helping the insurgent groups in Afghanistan and Iraq. He also told the media, soon after the International Atomic Energy Agency's release of its report on Iran, that the Iranian government was clearly going ahead with its nuclear program. Khalilzad explained that the US would try to pass another resolution in the Security Council, under Chapter 7, to impose additional sanctions against Iran.

In August 2008, he urged the Security Council to "take urgent action" and to "condemn Russia's military assault on the sovereign state of Georgia". He also stated that Russian Foreign Minister Sergey Lavrov had told US Secretary of State Rice that Georgian President Mikheil Saakashvili "must go."

== Private sector (2009–2018) ==
From 2009 to 2018, Khalilzad served as the President of Khalilzad Associates, LLC, an "international advisory firm that serves clients at the nexus of commerce and public policies, helping global businesses navigate the most promising and challenging international markets." Khalilzad Associates and its parent company, Gryphon Capital Partners, have, as clients, international and US companies that interested mainly in doing business in Iraq and Afghanistan. According to Khalilzad, they include companies in the sectors of energy, construction, education, and infrastructure. He and his son, Alexander Bernard, lost an oil contract in Afghanistan and complained about lack of support in Washington. <https://foreignpolicy.com/2011/10/06/zalmay-khalilzads-not-so-excellent-afghan-oil-adventure/>

Khalilzad served as a Counselor at the Center for Strategic International Studies (CSIS) and sits on the Boards of the National Endowment for Democracy (NED), America Abroad Media (AAM), the RAND Corporation's Middle East Studies Center, the Atlantic Council, the American University of Iraq in Suleymania (AUIS), The American University of Kurdistan (AUK), and the American University of Afghanistan (AUAF).

On September 9, 2014, a news items appeared in the Austrian media, stating that Khalilzad was being investigated by authorities in Austria for suspected money laundering, and that his wife's accounts had been frozen. On September 10, the Austrian court made known that the case had been dismissed and the accounts had been ordered unfrozen a week earlier, on September 3. The leak was the result of court documents having been discarded unshredded in the general trash, and then found by scavenging bloggers.

In 2015, he donated over $100,000 to the Atlantic Council, a US think tank.

Khalilzad's political autobiography, The Envoy: From Kabul to the White House, My Journey Through a Turbulent World, was published by St. Martin's Press in 2016.

== Envoy for Afghan reconciliation and aftermath ==
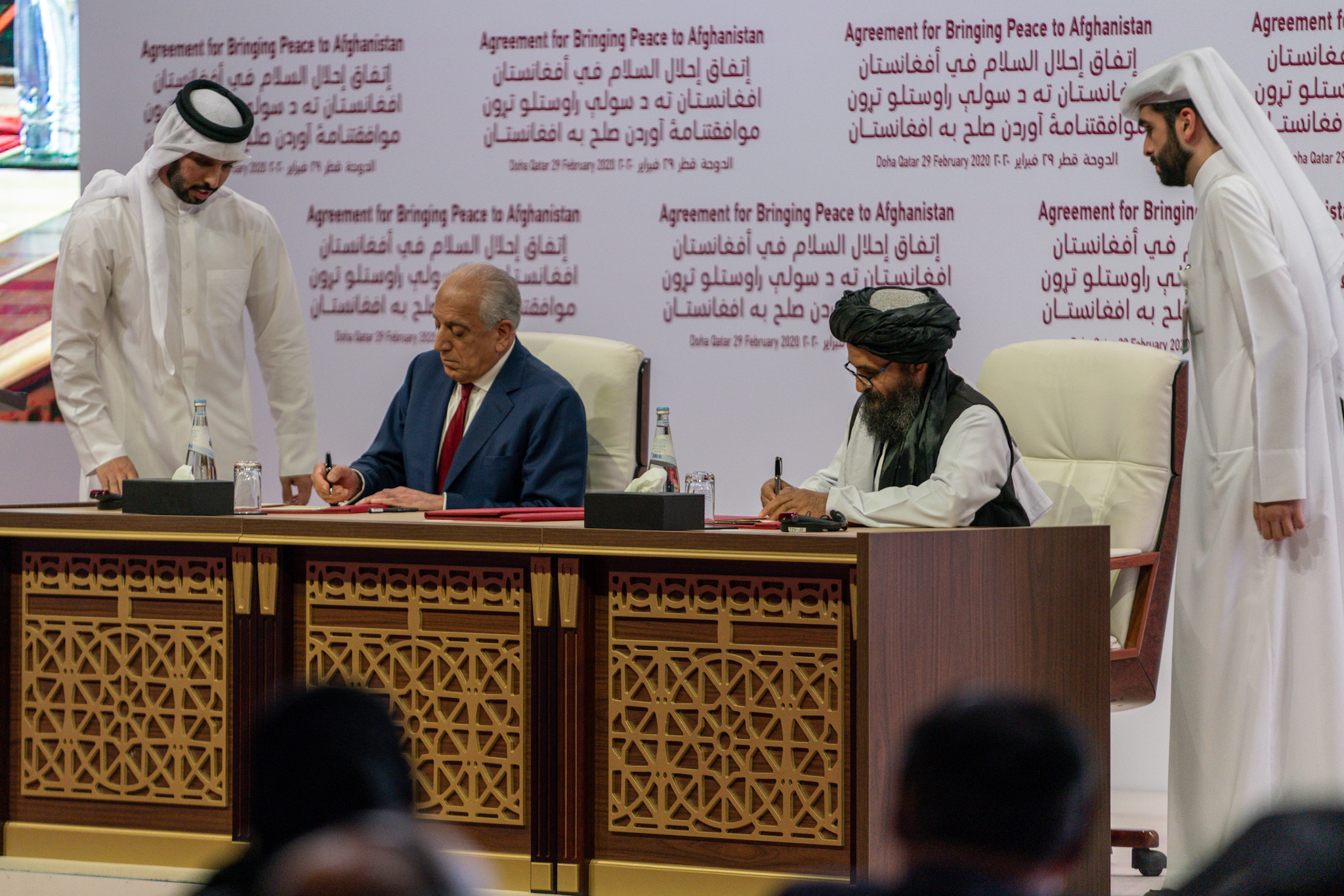
Khalilzad (left) and Taliban representative Abdul Ghani Baradar (right) sign the Agreement for Bringing Peace to Afghanistan in Doha, Qatar on February 29, 2020

In September 2018, Secretary of State Mike Pompeo appointed Khalilzad as the Special Representative for Afghanistan Reconciliation, a newly created diplomatic role aimed at negotiating a peaceful resolution to the war in Afghanistan. He remained in the position during the early months of the Joe Biden administration.

On May 18, 2021, during a hearing before the U.S. House Committee on Foreign Affairs, Khalilzad expressed skepticism about the likelihood of a rapid Taliban military victory following the planned U.S. withdrawal. He argued that an attempted Taliban takeover would lead to prolonged conflict, stating: "If they [the Taliban] pursue, in my judgment, a military victory, it will result in a long war, because Afghan security forces will fight, other Afghans will fight, [and] neighbors will come to support different forces."

He further stated: "I personally believe that the statements that the [Afghan] forces will disintegrate, and the Talibs will take over in short order, are mistaken. The real choices that the Afghans will face is between a long war and a negotiated settlement."

Despite these assessments, the 2021 Taliban offensive led to the rapid collapse of the Afghan government and the dissolution of the Afghan National Army. In an interview published by TRT World on September 21, 2021, Afghan political figure Ahmad Wali Massoud, a critic of both the Taliban and President Ashraf Ghani, accused Khalilzad of contributing to the circumstances that enabled the Taliban’s return to power. Massoud argued that the Taliban lacked the military capacity to retake Kabul independently and voiced concern regarding reported U.S. efforts to engage the Taliban in confronting ISIS-K.

== Awards ==
Khalilzad's service in the government has been recognized by three different secretaries of defense: Robert Gates awarded Khalilzad the Department of Defense medal for outstanding public service for his service in Iraq. Donald Rumsfeld awarded Khalilzad the Department of Defense medal for outstanding public service for his work in Afghanistan. Dick Cheney awarded Khalilzad the Department of Defense medal for outstanding public service for his time as assistant deputy under secretary of defense for policy planning from 1991 to 1992.

Khalilzad has also been awarded the highest national medals by the presidents of Afghanistan, Georgia and Kosovo. In Afghanistan he was awarded the King Amanullah Medal in 2005. The Georgian president awarded Khalilzad the Order of the Golden Fleece in 2016. Kosovo's president awarded Khalilzad the Order of Independence in 2017.

== Personal life ==
Khalilzad is an ethnic Pashtun. Khalilzad's wife is author and political analyst Cheryl Benard. They met in 1972 while they were both students at the American University of Beirut. They have two children.

Diplomatic posts
Preceded by Robert Finn	United States Ambassador to Afghanistan; 2003–2005	Succeeded by Ronald E. Neumann
Preceded by John Negroponte	United States Ambassador to Iraq; 2005–2007	Succeeded by Ryan Crocker
Preceded by Alejandro Wolff; Acting	United States Ambassador to the United Nations; 2007–2009	Succeeded by Susan Rice
