= Steven Gundry =

American physician and author (born 1950)

Steven R. Gundry
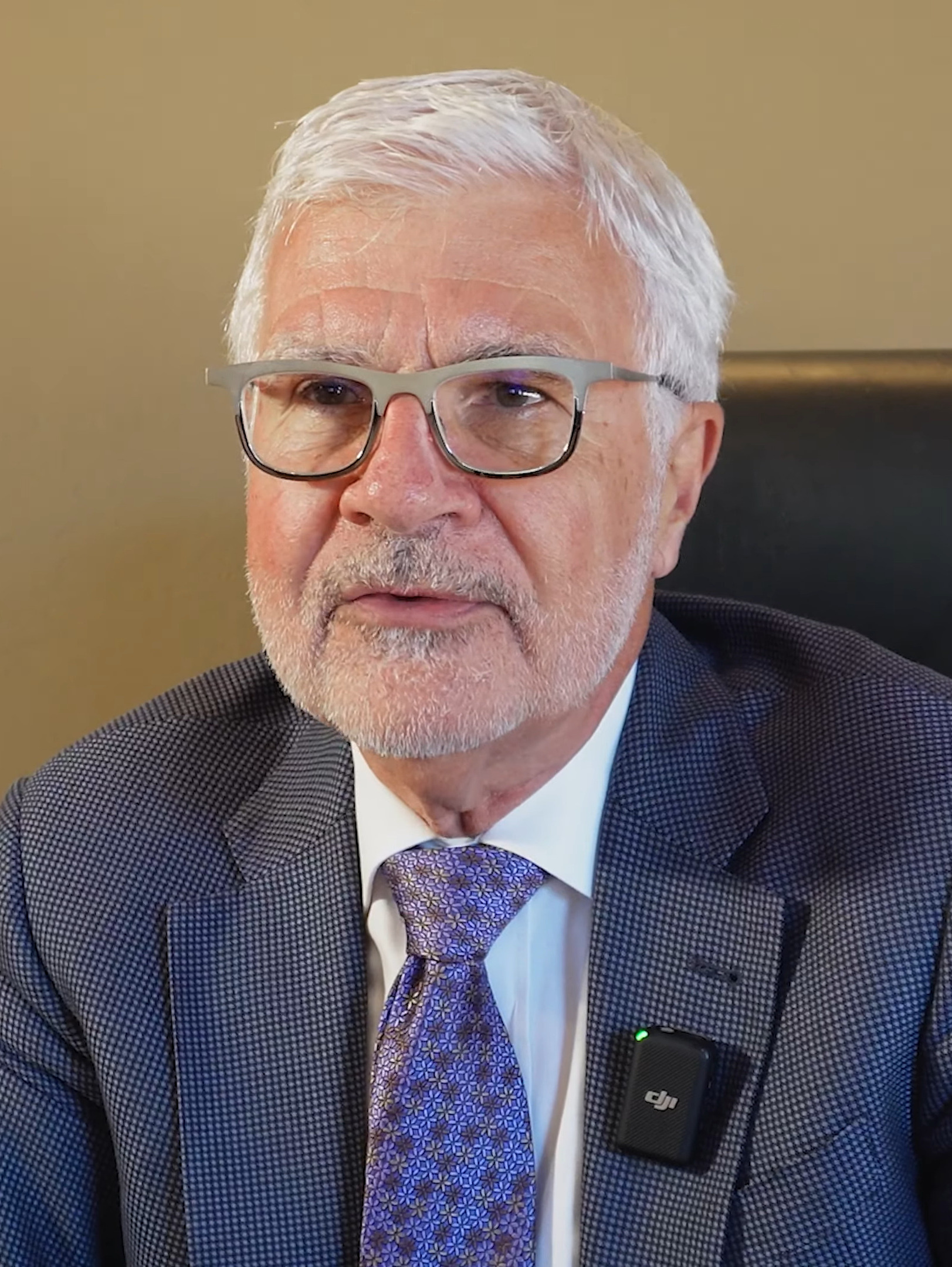
- Gundry in 2025
- Born: July 11, 1950 (age 76); Omaha, Nebraska, U.S.
- Education: Yale University (BA); Medical College of Georgia (MD)
- Scientific career
- Fields: Cardiothoracic surgery, nutrition
- Workplaces: Loma Linda University School of Medicine
- Website: gundrymd.com

Steven Robert Gundry (born July 11, 1950) is an American physician, low-carbohydrate diet author and former cardiothoracic surgeon. Gundry is the author of The Plant Paradox: The Hidden Dangers in "Healthy" Foods That Cause Disease and Weight Gain, which promotes the controversial and pseudoscientific lectin-free diet. He runs an experimental clinic investigating the impact of a lectin-free diet on health.

Gundry has made erroneous claims that lectins, a type of plant protein found in numerous foods, cause inflammation resulting in many modern diseases. His Plant Paradox diet suggests avoiding all foods containing lectins. Scientists and dietitians have classified Gundry's claims about lectins as pseudoscience. He sells supplements that he claims protect against or reverse the supposedly damaging effects of lectins.

== Career ==
=== Cardiothoracic surgeon ===
Gundry graduated from Yale University with a Bachelor of Arts degree in 1972 and went on to earn a M.D. at the Medical College of Georgia (a division of Augusta University) in 1977.

People reported in 1990 that an infant boy's heart spontaneously healed itself while waiting weeks on life support for a transplant from Gundry and Leonard Bailey. The boy's recovery made the need for a heart transplant unnecessary, and he underwent a successful four-hour surgery from Gundry to repair the mitral valve. Gundry has authored articles and registered several patents for medical devices during his career as a cardiothoracic surgeon.

In 2002, Gundry began transitioning from Clinical Professor of Cardiothoracic Surgery at Loma Linda University School of Medicine to private practice by starting The International Heart & Lung Institute in Palm Springs, California.

=== Nutritionist ===
By mid-2000s, Gundry was providing dietary consulting through The Center for Restorative Medicine, a branch of his private surgery practice.

Gundry has authored books focused on food-based health interventions. Although not mentioned in his first book, Dr. Gundry's Diet Evolution: Turn Off the Genes That Are Killing You and Your Waistline (2008), his second book, The Plant Paradox (2017), advocates avoiding lectins, a class of proteins found in numerous plants. In 2018, he published an accompanying recipe book.

He is the host of the Dr. Gundry Podcast on health and nutrition. Gundry writes articles for Gwyneth Paltrow's Goop website, which has been criticized for promoting quackery. Gundry has also supported the website of Joseph Mercola for giving "very useful health advice".

Gundry advocates a low-carbohydrate diet. In 2022, he authored Unlocking the Keto Code which promotes a lectin-free ketogenic diet consisting of goat and sheep dairy products, fermented foods, grass-fed beef, shellfish, olive oil, and red wine. Gundry's ketogenic diet encourages the consumption of polyphenols, time-restricted eating, and "mitochondrial uncoupling" to facilitate weight loss.

== Reception ==
=== Lectins ===
Gundry sells supplements that he claims protect against the damaging effect of lectins. Gundry's claims supporting the efficacy of the what he calls "dangerous" lectins have been thoroughly rebuked and rejected by the scientific community.

T. Colin Campbell, a biochemist and advocate for plant-based diets, states that The Plant Paradox contains numerous unsupported claims, and refutes that it makes a "convincing argument that lectins as a class are hazardous." Campbell also commented that "even more egregious are the wild claims he makes with no referencing at all, which is most of the text... Sometimes it almost seems like this author is just making things up that sound good".

Robert H. Eckel, an endocrinologist and past president of the American Heart Association, argues that Gundry's diet advice contradicts "every dietary recommendation represented by the American Cancer Society, American Heart Association, American Diabetes Association and so on" and that it is not possible to draw any conclusions from Gundry's own research due to the absence of control patients in his studies. Writing in New Scientist, food writer and chef Anthony Warner notes that Gundry's theories "are not supported by mainstream nutritional science" and that evidence of the benefits of high-lectin-containing diets "is so overwhelming as to render Gundry's arguments laughable".

Harriet Hall of Science-Based Medicine has noted that Gundry's alleged evidence for the benefits of a lectin-free diet is anecdotal and meaningless as there are no studies with control groups in the medical literature to support his claims. Hall concluded that Gundry is not a reliable source of medical information and asserts that "the lectin foods that Gundry prohibits are part of a science-based healthy diet. Avoiding them might lead to inadequate nutrition."

Mario Kratz of Red Pen Reviews gave Gundry's book The Plant Paradox an overall score of 49% and a 29% score for scientific accuracy. Kratz stated that the book's strong claim that a lectin-free diet can prevent and reverse most chronic diseases is not supported by scientific evidence. He also commented that the book makes an unusual claim that consumption of fruit leads to obesity and weight gain which is not supported by any evidence and is contradicted by cohort and experimental studies which show an inverse association. Kratz concluded that "while the diet recommended in The Plant Paradox probably has general health benefits for people who can stick with it, it's not clear whether avoiding common dietary lectins is beneficial".

Although Today's Dietitian acknowledges that consuming raw beans, which contain lectins, could be harmful, it concludes that "it would be nonsensical for any dietetics professional to recommend a lectin-free diet."

=== COVID-19 ===
In November 2021, Gundry published a poster abstract in Circulation which claimed that mRNA vaccines against the COVID-19 virus "dramatically increase" inflammation and that this was associated with heart disease. Commentators in British media cited the abstract as evidence of the mRNA vaccines being unsafe. The abstract was not peer-reviewed before publication. The American Heart Association issued an expression of concern, warning that the abstract may not be reliable and that, among other problems, there were "no statistical analyses for significance provided, and the author is not clear that only anecdotal data was used". The Reuters Fact Check team concluded that it did "not provide reliable evidence that mRNA vaccines increase risk of heart disease". Full Fact noted that the claims in the abstract relied on results from a test for which there was little evidence that it could accurately predict the risk of heart attacks.

== Selected publications ==
- Dr. Gundry's Diet Evolution: Turn Off the Genes That Are Killing You and Your Waistline. New York: Harmony Books. 2009. ISBN 978-0307352118.
- The Plant Paradox: The Hidden Dangers in 'Healthy' Foods That Cause Disease and Weight Gain. New York: Harper Wave. 2017. ISBN 978-0062427137.
- The Plant Paradox Cookbook: 100 Delicious Recipes to Help You Lose Weight, Heal Your Gut, and Live Lectin-Free. New York: Harper Wave. 2018. ISBN 978-0062843371.
- The Plant Paradox Quick and Easy: The 30-Day Plan to Lose Weight, Feel Great, and Live Lectin-Free. New York: Harper Wave. 2019. ISBN 978-0062911995.
- The Longevity Paradox: How to Die Young at a Ripe Old Age. New York: Harper Wave. 2019. ISBN 978-0062843395.
- The Plant Paradox Family Cookbook: 80 One-Pot Recipes to Nourish Your Family Using Your Instant Pot, Slow Cooker, or Sheet Pan. New York: Harper Wave. 2019. ISBN 978-0062911834.
- The Energy Paradox: What to Do When Your Get-Up-and-Go Has Got Up and Gone. Harper Wave. 2021. ISBN 978-0063005730.
- Unlocking the Keto Code: The Revolutionary New Science of Keto That Offers More Benefits Without Deprivation. Harper Wave. 2022. ISBN 978-0063118386.
