= Origins: The Journey of Humankind =

American documentary television series

- Genre: Historical nonfiction
- Created by: John D. Boswell
- Presented by: Jason Silva
- Narrated by: Mark Monroe
- Theme music composer: John Boswell
- Country of origin: United States
- Original language: English
- No. of episodes: 8

Production
- Running time: 60 minutes
- Production company: Asylum Entertainment

Original release
- Network: National Geographic
- Release: March 6 – May 1, 2017

Origins: The Journey of Humankind is an American documentary television series that premiered on the National Geographic channel on March 6, 2017. Hosted by Jason Silva, with narration from Mark Monroe, the series uses re-enactments to showcase major inventions and events in the history of human evolution that have been responsible for our modernization. In the eight-part series, each episode is themed on one aspect of human civilization: fire, medicine, money, communication, war, shelter, exploration, and transportation. Jason Silva has mentioned the works of Marshall McLuhan to be instrumental in conceptualizing the show. Andrew Byrd, an academic expert in linguistics, assisted with the ancient languages spoken during the dramatization.

== Episodes ==
No.	Title	Original release date	U.S. viewers (millions)
1	"Spark of Civilization"	March 6, 2017	N/A
The ability to harness fire and control it gave humans the power to create, transform, and destroy. Firepower has converted us from living as early nomadic tribes to a species with the ability to undertake space voyages.
2	"Cheating Death"	March 13, 2017	N/A
Throughout evolution, the human species has been battling diseases. Causes were initially unknown, but in the process of finding cures, we discovered microscopic biological organisms that acted as causal agents. Medical science has helped humans make huge progress in fighting modern-day plagues.
3	"Power of Money"	March 20, 2017	N/A
Expansion of societies led to the proliferation of trade routes. As commerce flourished, the barter system prevalent in inter-societal trades gave way to the currency system, which in turn led to the modern-day global economy.
4	"The Writing on the Wall"	March 27, 2017	N/A
Interaction within a species is indispensable to their survival. Communication between humans began with sign languages, cave paintings, and hieroglyphs. With time, this led to the development of complex languages with expressive forms that connected people to civilizations from other parts of the globe.
5	"Progress of War"	April 10, 2017	N/A
The human species has developed in many ways and warfare is no exception. From the need of early humans to protect themselves from hostile conditions in the wilderness, to battles fought between humans themselves, war has been a catalyst for many inventions.
6	"Building the Future"	April 17, 2017	N/A
The journey from being nomadic hunter-gatherers to building modern-day skyscrapers has been a great human achievement. Our homes are not just a dwelling place; they represent our perpetual desire for a more complex world.
7	"Into the Unknown"	April 24, 2017	N/A
The human desire for exploration has led us to the depths of the sea and all the way to the moon. Our curiosity of the unknown has been the driving force behind new inventions.
8	"The Road Ahead"	May 1, 2017	N/A
Human travel led to the exchange of ideas, which in turn resulted in innovations, facilitating new modes of transport. Animals used in early civilizations have been replaced by engines and vehicles that transport us over great distances within short periods of time.

== See also ==
- Mankind: The Story of All of Us
