= Edit Schlaffer =

Edit Schlaffer (born 25 September 1950 in Stegersbach, Burgenland, Austria), is a social scientist and the founder of Women Without Borders, based in Vienna, Austria. Her international efforts focus on grassroots, community-based female diplomacy, namely empowering women as agents of change and a critical driving force in stabilizing an insecure world.

She and Cheryl Benard contributed the piece "Benevolent despotism versus the contemporary feminist movement" to the 1984 anthology Sisterhood Is Global: The International Women's Movement Anthology, edited by Robin Morgan.

== Career ==
Schlaffer started Women without Borders in 2001, headquartered in Vienna, which partners with local organizations in various countries to implement a number of integrated projects that aim to strengthen capabilities through education, collaboration and self-confidence: key tools for establishing a female power base in countries in crisis and transition.

In 2008 she launched the Sisters Against Violent Extremism (SAVE) campaign, focusing Women without Border's efforts to the security arena, organizing women (and men) internationally to take part in a research-based, family-centered counter-radicalization platform. Schlaffer's work seeks to propagate a security paradigm in which women serve on the front lines; one in which women's talents, skills, and unique position within the family structure are used to shape a new security architecture.

In implementing the SAVE platform, Schlaffer has partnered with organizations in 16 different countries including India (and Kashmir), Pakistan, Tajikistan, Indonesia, Zanzibar and Nigeria to set up "MotherSchools." These series of weekly training meetings, run by female community leaders, empower mothers with the competence and confidence to safeguard the young from the threat of violent extremism and the lure of radicalization. Furthermore, these meetings allow for collaboration, mutual support, and shared understanding.

A regular contributor to various news outlets including Huffington Post and Reuters Trust Law blogs, Schlaffer's efforts and research focus on gender and counter-terrorism strategies, peace-building through dialogue, and examining the role of civil society in improving the security architecture. In 2013, Schlaffer, in collaboration with Dr. Ulrich Kropiunigg, conducted the first empirical research study into the potential of mothers to recognize early warning signs of radicalization in their sons and the needed tools to respond effectively. This study was supported by the Austrian Fund for Scientific Research.

Additionally Schlaffer has produced a number of short films highlighting female change-makers as well as perpetrators and survivors of terrorist acts. Her recent film, Your Mother, features the testimonies of mothers of sons who harmed or intended to harm others in the name of Jihad. The film is used as an education tool to raise awareness in communities where radicalism is propagated.

Schlaffer is a regular speaker in diverse settings: from TED talks, the Hedayah Center of Excellence, the Omega Institute, the Global Center on Cooperative Security, the Europe-wide Radicalisation Awareness Network to the OSCE and various United Nations branches. Women without Borders under her leadership has been lauded by both government and independent agencies, particularly surrounding its efforts to empower women in combatting extremism as an alternative security strategy. In 2005 she was awarded the Kaethe Leichter Austrian State Prize for Gender Equality and Research. In 2011 Schlaffer was named one of Newsweek′s "150 Movers and Shakers" and in 2010 she was named "21 Leaders of the 21st Century" by Women's eNews. Recently she was included on the Daily Beast′s 2014 List of the World's Women of Consequence and spoke at the 2014 Women of the World Summit at the Lincoln Center in New York about SAVE's work in galvanizing women and mothers to counter the increasing radicalization of youth. In 2012 she spoke at TEDxWomen in Washington DC, alongside two members of SAVE's partner organizations in Pakistan and India promoting reconciliation and collaboration among groups of women with histories of political conflict. Former Secretary Hillary Clinton has twice highlighted SAVE's contributions to the field. Most recently Schlaffer was awarded the Aenne Burda Award for Creative Leadership at the 2015 Digital Life Design (DLD) Conference in Munich.

Schlaffer currently serves as Civil Society Board Member for the Global Community Engagement and Resilience Fund (GCERF). She was the former Director of the Ludwig Boltzmann Institute for Politics and Interpersonal Relations, Vienna (1980–2001), and Chairperson of the Austrian Foundation for World Population and International Cooperation (2004–11). She is also the co-author of a number of titles covering themes of politics and gender relationships published in German. She earned a doctorate in Communication Science and Sociology from the University of Vienna (1972) and completed psychoanalytical training at the Children's Hospital in Vienna (1986).

Schlaffer is married and has two children.
