= Lectin-free diet =

Fad diet

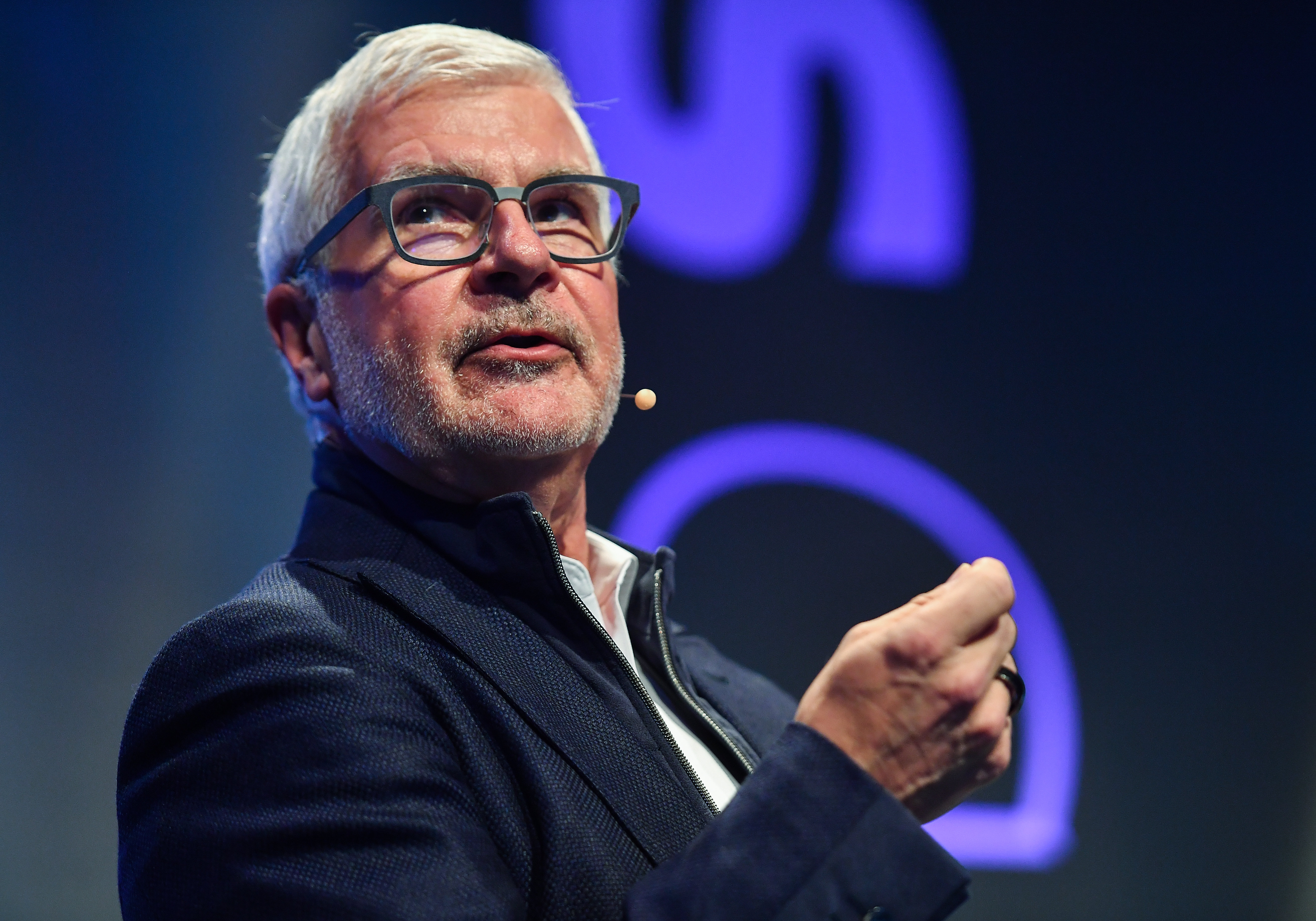
Steven Gundry, a notable advocate of a lectin-free diet

The Lectin-free diet (also known as the Plant Paradox diet) is a fad diet promoted with the false claim that avoiding all foods that contain high amounts of lectins will prevent and cure disease. There is no clinical evidence the lectin-free diet is effective to treat any disease and its claims have been criticized as pseudoscientific.

== Overview ==
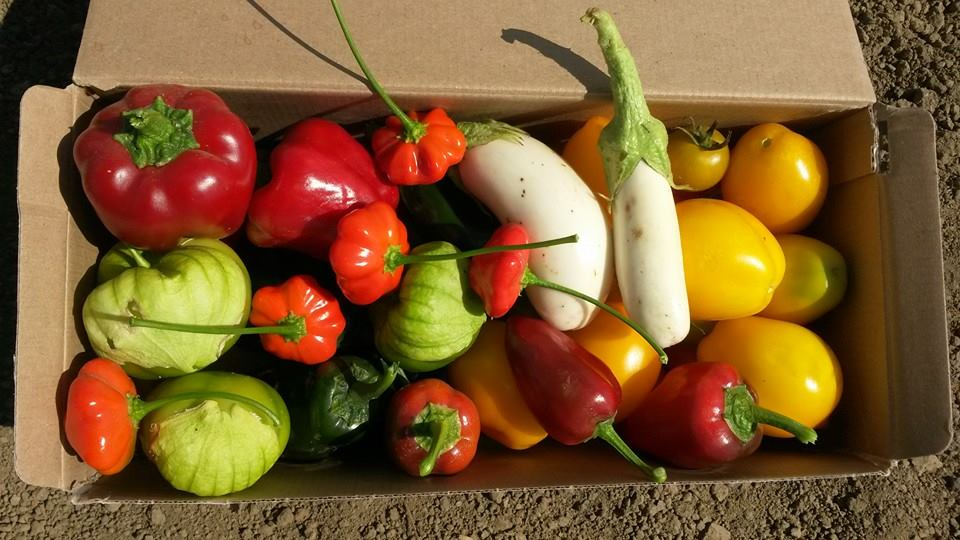
The lectin-free diet forbids all nightshade vegetables such as eggplants, red peppers and tomatoes

The lectin-free diet forbids all foods that are high in lectins including legumes (beans, chickpeas, lentils, peas), grains, fruit, nightshade vegetables (tomatoes and potatoes), nuts, seeds and many others. The first writer to advocate a lectin-free diet was Peter J. D'Adamo, a naturopathic physician best known for promoting the blood type diet. D'Adamo has argued that lectins may damage people's blood type by interfering with digestion, food metabolism, hormones and insulin production so should be avoided.

The lectin-free diet has been popularized by cardiologist and former professor of surgery and pediatrics Steven Gundry, who wrote the book called The Plant Paradox. Gundry claims he has discovered that lectins cause most human diseases, and erroneously claims that his diet will prevent and cure them. His book argues that eating tomatoes incites "a kind of chemical warfare in our bodies, causing inflammatory reactions that can lead to weight gain and serious health conditions." When questioned about the high consumption of beans and grains amongst long-lived people in the blue zones, Gundry says that such lectin foods are countered by their large intake of olive oil polyphenols, fish and red wine. Gundry has stated that his lectin-free diet consists of a "cornucopia of vegetables, like kale, spinach, broccoli and sprouts, avocados, limited amounts of high-quality protein sources, and some dairy products and olive oil." He likewise states that "arthritis, most coronary artery disease, acne, eczema, and the autoimmune diseases are all caused or worsened by lectins."

Gundry sells a "lectin shield" supplement which claims to "neutralize the effects of lectins" for $79.99 and as a consequence, has a conflict of interest towards promoting his fad diet. In one infomercial that lasted almost an hour, he announced that supplies of his supplements were running low, and told viewers to act immediately and order as many as they could store. The necessity of supplements is similarly the crucial argument of his book, in which he writes "getting all of the nutrients you need simply cannot be done without supplements."

== Reception ==
For Science-Based Medicine, Harriet Hall said that Gundry's diet was not science-based and that following it risked dietary deficiencies.

Preliminary studies have revealed health benefits from lectin consumption and minute evidence of harm. Foods high in lectins such as beans and grains are soaked and boiled to significantly reduce their lectin content. Megan Rossi, a registered dietitian and spokeswoman for the British Dietetic Association has commented that lectins are relatively easy to remove by cooking and preparing in the right way so are not a concern for most people. She also noted that studies have shown that lectins possess "potential anti-cancerous effects".

A 2019 article in the World Journal of Gastroenterology suggested that lectin-restricted dieting could become a "big food fad".

== See also ==
- Antinutrient
- Quackery
