= Cheryl Benard =

American social scientist and novelist

- Born: 1953 (age 72–73); New Orleans, Louisiana, U.S.
- Education: University of Vienna (PhD); American University of Beirut (BA)
- Occupations: Novelist, researcher
- Spouse: Zalmay Khalilzad
- Children: Alexander Benard; Maximilian Benard
- Writing career
- Genres: Fiction, non-fiction

Cheryl Benard (born 1953) is an American-Austrian writer, novelist and political-social scientist. She is the wife of Zalmay Khalilzad, former U.S. Ambassador to the United Nations, Afghanistan and Iraq. She and Khalilzad have two sons, Alexander Benard and Maximilian Benard.

== Career ==
Benard worked as an actress in German films as a child. She later took a BA from the American University of Beirut and went on to earn a Ph.D. from the University of Vienna. She taught political science at the University of Vienna. Later, she served as research director of the Boltzmann Institute of Politics, a European think tank.

Presently, Benard is president of Alliance for the Restoration of Cultural Heritage (ARCH) International, a DC-based non-profit research and advocacy organisation dedicated to the support of cultural activism, specifically in post-conflict situations.

=== Writings ===
Benard is a novelist and a widely published author on topics including popular sociology, refugees, women in nation-building, youth radicalisation in the European Diaspora, and humanitarian aid. Her books have been translated into many other languages and some were bestsellers in Europe.

She is a feminist writer. She and Edit Schlaffer contributed the piece "Benevolent despotism versus the contemporary feminist movement" to the 1984 anthology Sisterhood Is Global: The International Women's Movement Anthology, edited by Robin Morgan.

Benard also wrote Turning on the Girls, a 2001 American comedic dystopian science fiction novel.

Benard's book, Eurojihad – Patterns of Islamist Radicalization and Terrorism in Europe, with Angel Rabasa, was published by Cambridge University Press in November 2014.

== Controversy ==
Benard's Austrian bank account was frozen in February 2014. This happened as part of an investigation into allegations of money laundering by Benard's husband, former U.S. official Zalmay Khalizad. Benard and Khalilzad were subsequently cleared by the Austrian court system and US authorities and the freezing of her accounts was found to have been illegal. Prior to the announcement of the court decision, information about the investigation was leaked to the press, allegedly the result of court documents having been disposed of unshredded in the general trash and found by scavenging bloggers.

Benard has opposed the removal of Confederate monuments and memorials, likening the protesters to ISIS.

== Books ==
- Benard, Cheryl; Schlaffer, Edit (1980). Der Mann auf der Straße: Über das merkwürdige Verhalten von Männern in ganz alltäglichen Situationen [The man on the street: On the strange behavior of men in everyday situations] (in German). Reinbek, Germany: Rowohlt. ISBN 978-3-499-17305-9.
- Benard, Cheryl; Khalilzad, Zalmay (1984). The Government of God: Iran's Islamic Republic. New York City: Columbia University Press. ISBN 0-231-05376-2.
- Benard, Cheryl; Schlaffer, Edit (1990). Laßt endlich die Männer in Ruhe oder wie man sie weniger und sich selbst mehr liebt [Finally leave men alone: How to love them less and yourself more] (in German). Reinbek, Germany: Rowohlt. ISBN 978-3-498-00522-1. OCLC 180432430.
- Benard, Cheryl; Schlaffer, Edit (2000). Wie aus Mädchen tolle Frauen werden : Selbstbewußtsein jenseits aller Klischees [How girls become great women: Self-confidence beyond all clichés] (in German). Munich: Heyne. ISBN 3-453-17264-7.
- Benard, Cheryl (2000). Moghul buffet. New York City: Soho Press. ISBN 1-56947-179-7.
- Benard, Cheryl (2001). Turning on the girls. New York City: Farrar Straus & Giroux. ISBN 978-0-374-28178-6. OCLC 44467307. Republished as Turning on the girls. New York City: Washington Square Press. 2002. ISBN 978-0-7434-4291-6.
- Benard, Cheryl (2002). L'inconnue de Peshawar [The unknown woman from Peshawar] (in French). Paris: 10/18. ISBN 2-264-03224-3.
- Benard, Cheryl; Schlaffer, Edit (2002). Einsame Cowboys : Jungen in der Pubertät [Lonely cowboys: Boys in puberty] (in German). Munich: Deutscher Taschenbuch Verlag. ISBN 3-423-36295-2.
- Benard, Cheryl; Schlaffer, Edit (2002). Veiled courage: Inside the Afghan women's resistance. New York City: Broadway. ISBN 0-7679-1301-9.
- Benard, Cheryl; Schlaffer, Edit (2003). Supermacht Mann, oder, Das Ende der Vernunft [Superpower man: The end of reason] (in German). Vienna, Austria: Ueberreuter. ISBN 978-3-8000-3998-2. OCLC 55062104. (This book is critical of U.S. military interventions.)
- Benard, Cheryl (2003). Civil democratic Islam: Partners, resources, and strategies. Santa Monica, California: Rand Corporation. ISBN 978-0-8330-3438-0. OCLC 52381132.
