= Women Without Borders =

Women without Borders (WwB)
- Frauen ohne Grenzen
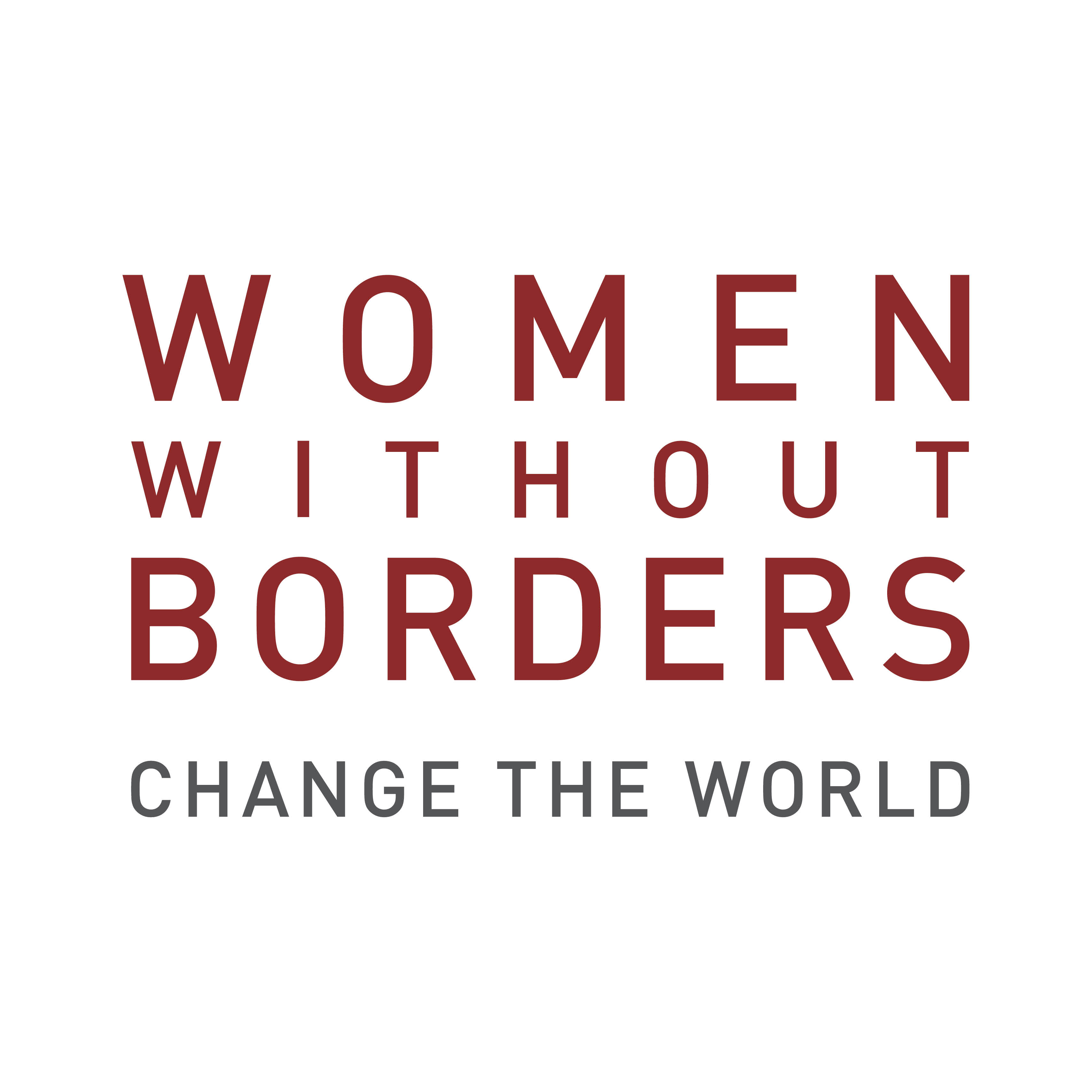
- Abbreviation: WwB
- Founded: 2001
- Founder: Dr. Edit Schlaffer
- Type: Non-profit
- Location: Vienna, Austria
- Website: wwb.org

Women without Borders is an international advocacy and research organization for women. It is based in Vienna, Austria, and works with international partner organizations around the world. Dr. Edit Schlaffer founded WwB in 2002 with the goal of empowering women as agents of change. The Women without Borders Executive Board includes the Austrian artist Xenia Hausner. Women without Borders is largely funded by various Austrian Ministries, the Austrian Research Fund, the EU, and the US State Department.

== Projects and Activities ==
Since its inception, Women Without Borders has conducted a variety of projects in countries of crisis and transition, including Chennai in Southeast India, Zaranj, Turkey, Cyprus, and Austria.

Women without Borders invited 18 women from Iraq, Afghanistan, Iran, South Africa, Israel, Palestine and Senegal to the first Women Without Borders conference in 2003. Since then, conferences organized by the NGO have been attended by government officials and high-level representatives of politics and civil society, including members of parliament and presidents of NGOs.

In Afghanistan, in preparation for the 2004 Afghan elections, Women Without Borders created a handbook to encourage Afghan women to vote.

With funding from the Austrian Research Fund, Women without Borders conducted a two-year “Bridging the Gap” study in Saudi Arabia. Women Without Borders surveyed 4,455 male and female students at King Saud University, King Abdul Aziz University, Qassim University, and King Faisal University to gather data on their views toward changing gender roles, future employment, and their health. Based on the findings, WwB developed workshops for female Saudi students.

Women without Borders has also conducted projects against domestic violence. The campaign Women Against Terror gave women who have been severely beaten a platform to voice their personal views and perspectives.

== Sports projects ==
Women without Borders has conducted several sports-oriented projects, including:

"Kicking for Reconciliation!" in Kigali, Rwanda, which used football as a tool to bring together Hutu and Tutsi girls to overcome trauma, hate and resentment.

Women without Borders ran swimming lessons for women and girls in Chennai shortly after the tsunami to boost their chances of survival in the face of future events.

== SAVE campaign ==
In 2008, Women Without Borders launched SAVE (Sisters Against Violent Extremism), the first women’s counter-terrorism platform. The first conference took place from November 28-December 1, 2008 at Palais Schönburg in Vienna. Thirty-three survivors of terrorist attacks, relatives of victims and terrorists, activists, and policy makers were invited to discuss their experiences, strategize methods to combat violent extremism, and to create the SAVE declaration.

SAVE campaigns include: Schools/Students Against Violent Extremism! and Mothers for Change! which attempt to provide constructive alternatives to the appeal of extremist ideologies.

WwB started student groups under the Students Against Violent Extremism campaign in Delhi, Lucknow and Mumbai, conducting educational and interactive seminars attended by survivors of terrorist attacks for University and school children, with the aim of sensitizing them to the role they can play in combating extremism. SAVE is implementing similar projects with schools in Yemen and Indonesia.

Mothers For Change! is SAVE's most recent project, seeking to engage mothers in combating extremism and terrorism. Pilot research is underway on the project in Yemen and Saudi Arabia.

In April 2010, SAVE conducted a workshop for the wives, daughters, sisters, and mothers of the police constables who protected lives during the 26/11 attacks, some of whom were killed while others were left severely disabled. Through storytelling workshops and swimming lessons, the women were encouraged to face and better cope with their traumatic experiences, while fostering a group sense of belonging.

SAVE chapters have been started in India, Yemen, Northern Ireland, and the United Kingdom.
