= Turning on the Girls =

2001 novel by Cheryl Benard

- Cover of the hardback edition, 2001
- Author: Cheryl Benard
- Language: English
- Genre: Science fiction, comedy, dystopian
- Publisher: Farrar, Straus and Giroux
- Publication date: 2001
- Publication place: United States
- Pages: 256
- ISBN: 0-7434-4291-1

Turning on the Girls is a 2001 American comedic dystopian science fiction novel written by Cheryl Benard.

== Plot ==
A decade ago women took over world and have changed everything, schools, language, women's and men's thinking. Lisa, a twenty-two-year-old who works at a government ministry dedicated to mental revolution, is given the task to update female sexual fantasies, which means no masochistic or romantic daydreams. Not all men are pleased with this new world order and Harmony, an underground men's movement, plans a violent uprising to put things back the way they were, while Lisa and her assistant Justin are recruited to infiltrate Harmony.
