= Digital Life Design =

Global conference network

Digital Life Design (DLD) is a global conference network, organized by Munich-based DLD Media, a company of Hubert Burda Media.

In 2005, Stephanie Czerny founded DLD as an annual conference scheme. The main purpose of DLD is to bring together business, creative and social leaders, as well as investors and opinion formers, to exchange ideas and get inspired. Since its first gathering, DLD hosted events in New York City, Beijing, San Francisco, London, Moscow, New Delhi, Rio de Janeiro, Hong Kong, Tel Aviv and Munich.

DLD Conference is referred to by the Economist as one of Europe's leading conferences on innovation. New-media site Sifted, backed by the Financial Times, recently ranked the event platform as one of "Europe's best tech conferences".

The company's flagship conference, DLD Munich, hosts over 1000 guests from more than 50 countries. The three-day event always takes place in January, right before the World Economic Forum in Davos. DLD's motto, Connect the Unexpected, brings people together from various fields and interests, addressing a wide range of topics such as technology, arts, science and politics, and talking about the future and its implications on today's life.

Past speakers include Mark Zuckerberg, Lady Gaga, Yoko Ono, Jimmy Wales, Maria Ressa, Kai-Fu Lee, Francis Kéré, Satya Nadella, Zaha Hadid, Hans Ulrich Obrist, Scott Galloway, Sheryl Sandberg, Margrethe Vestager, Emmanuel Macron and many more.

== Background ==
Stephanie Czerny is the event platform's co-founder and managing director, chaired by Hubert Burda and Yossi Vardi.

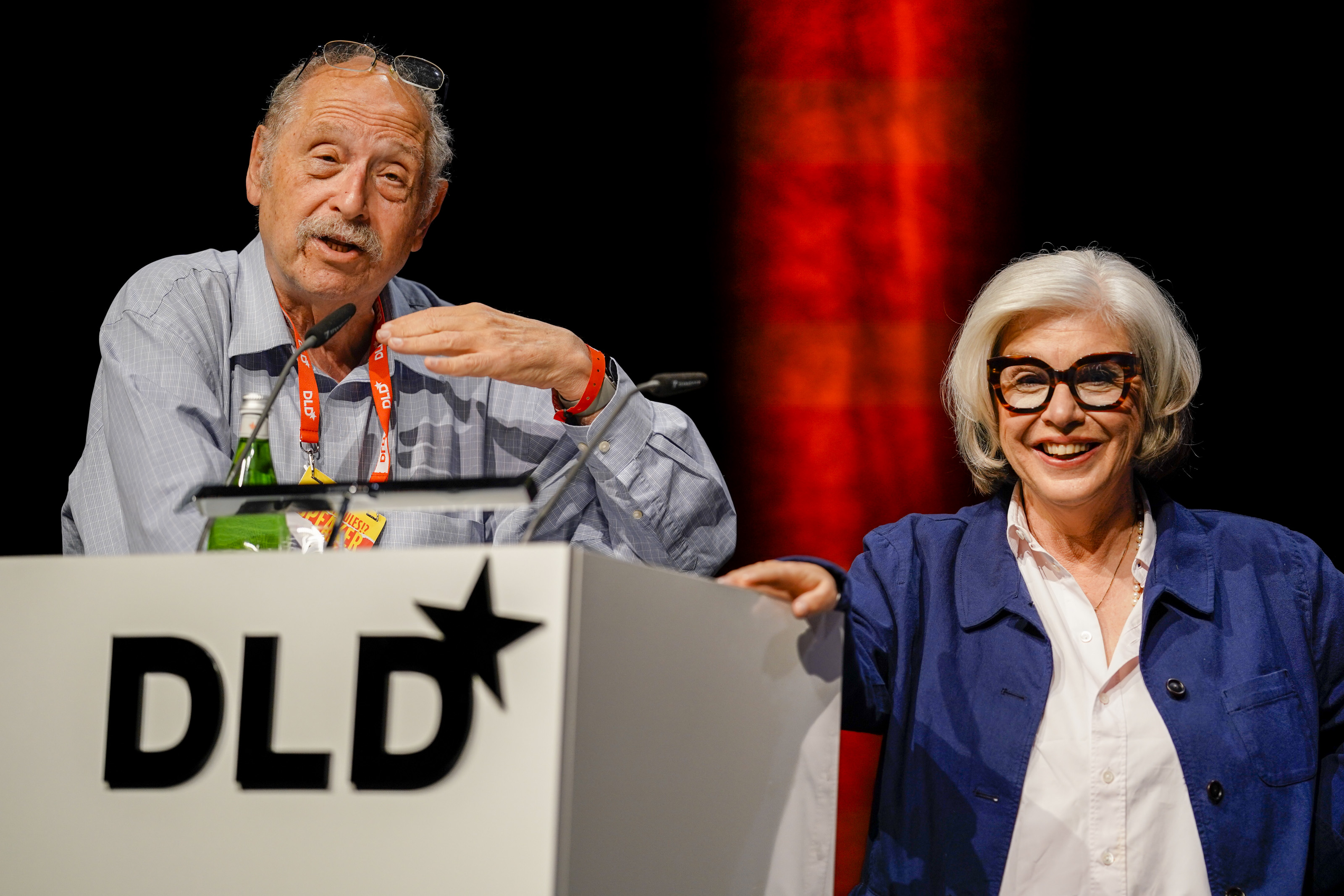
Steffi Czerny and Yossi Vardi opening DLD Munich 22

After bringing DLD Conference to life in 2005, DLD Media GmbH has been founded as a subsidiary of Hubert Burda Media to expand the brand. Steffi Czerny and Co-Founder Marcel Reichart were named its managing directors. Since then, the company has steadily grown and is now offering various conferences besides DLD Munich around the globe, as well as salons, dinners, lectures, hikes and other events.

All events are by invitation only. However, those interested can apply via the company's website.

Until 2018, the conference's venue was the listed bank building at Kardinal-Faulhaber-Straße 1 (HVB Forum). In 2019, DLD Munich took place at Alte Kongresshalle for the first time.

All talks and sessions can be watched over a live stream.

Each year the slogan of the conference accordingly changes to the dominant theme.

Conference	Theme
DLD 2006	No specific theme
DLD 2007	No specific theme
DLD 2008	Uploading the 21st century
DLD 2009	New Realities
DLD 2010	Map your Future
DLD 2011	Update your Reality
DLD 2012	All you need is ... Data?
DLD 2013	Patterns That Connect
DLD 2014	Content & Context
DLD 2015	It's Only the Beginning
DLD 2016	The Next Next
DLD 2017	...what's the plan?
DLD 2018	Reconquer
DLD 2019	Optimism & Courage
DLD 2020	What are you adding?
DLD 2021	What the World Needs Now…
DLD 2022	Reality Rules!?

== Aenne Burda Award ==
In memory of his mother's entrepreneurial and social commitment, Hubert Burda established the Aenne Burda Award for creative leadership, honoring women with visionary ideas.

Past laureates have been:

Jahr	Preisträger
2006	Marissa Mayer
2007	Caterina Fake
2008	Martha Stewart
2009	Esther Dyson
2010	Mitchell Baker
2011	Natalie Massenet
2012	Arianna Huffington
2013	Zaha Hadid
2014	Viviane Reding
2015	Edit Schlaffer
2017	Auguste von Bayern
2018	Rose McGowan
2019	Fatoumata Ba
2020	Maja Hoffmann
2022	Andrea Pfeifer
