= Robert H. Eckel =

American endocrinologist

- Education: University of Cincinnati
- Scientific career
- Fields: Endocrinology
- Workplaces: University of Colorado Denver

Robert H. Eckel is an American endocrinologist. He holds the Charles A. Boettcher II Endowed Chair in atherosclerosis at the University of Colorado Denver, where he is also a professor of medicine and professor of physiology and biophysics. In 2016 Eckel was among the recipients of the Laureate Awards of the Endocrine Society, as Outstanding Clinical Investigator. He has done significant research in the biology and pathophysiology of lipoprotein lipase.

Eckel was on the Scientific Advisory Council of the National Institute of Diabetes and Digestive and Kidney Diseases at the National Institutes of Health. His research area includes nutrition, insulin action, energy balance and body weight regulation.

Eckel is a former president of the American Heart Association, and a fellow of the American College of Cardiology and the American College of Physicians; he received the Robert H. Herman Award from the American Society for Nutrition in 2011.

== Selected publications ==
- Metabolic Risk for Cardiovascular Disease Wiley-Blackwell 2010 ISBN 978-1405181044
- Obesity: Mechanisms and Clinical Management Lippincott Williams & Wilkins 2003 ISBN 978-0781728447
