= Robi Damelin =

Israeli peace activist

Robi Damelin (Hebrew: רובי דמלין) is an Israeli peace activist. Her son, David, was killed by a Palestinian sniper while serving in the Israeli army reserves.

== Biography ==
Damelin was born and raised in a progressive family in South Africa during apartheid. Her family was politically active in the anti-apartheid movement, her uncle having defended Nelson Mandela during the 1956 Treason Trial. Pressure from South African authorities due to Damelin's vocal opposition to the apartheid led to her moving to Israel in her 20s, as a volunteer, during the Six-Day War in June 1967. The war ended soon after she arrived, and she settled in a kibbutz, attending a Hebrew program to learn the language. Soon after, she got married and had two sons, David and Eran. She worked at The Jerusalem Post, then with immigrants. After her divorce, she relocated to Tel Aviv, where she ran a public relations company.

=== Death of son ===
Damelin's son, David was in the Israeli army reserves and was stationed at the Ofra checkpoint. He was killed by a Palestinian sniper on 3 March 2002, aged 28. The sniper was captured two years later in October 2004.

== Activism ==
Robi is the spokesperson and director of International Relations for The Parents Circle-Families Forum (PCFF), a grassroots organization made up of hundreds of bereaved Israeli and Palestinian families working together for reconciliation and peace.

She is a regular contributor to The Forward, Haaretz, and other media outlets. She is the protagonist featured in a 2012 documentary, One Day after Peace, directed by Erez Laufer. She has spoken at multiple international events, at universities, and at the European Parliament.
