= Paul Saladino =

American physician and health influencer

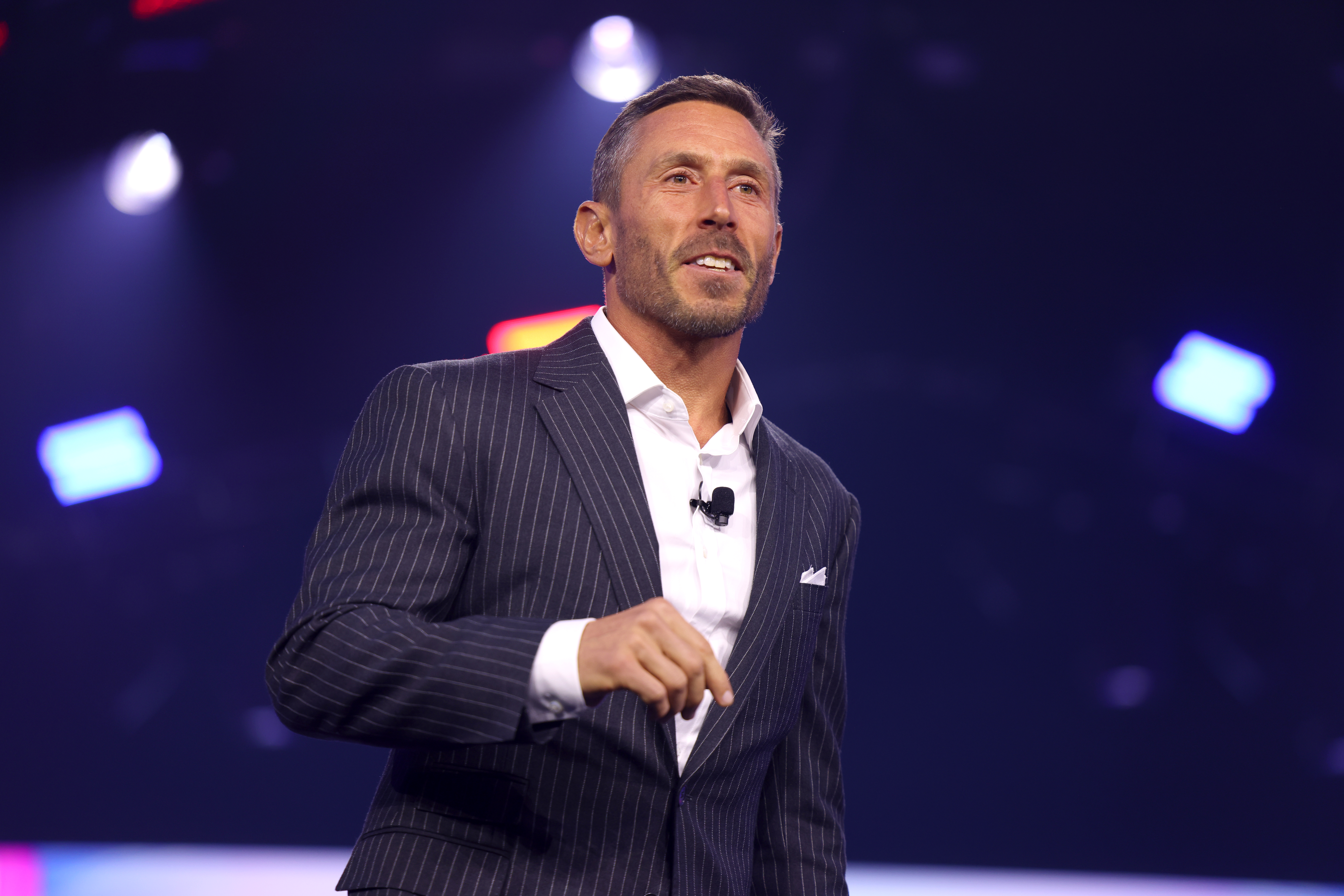
- Saladino at the 2024 AmericaFest
- Born: June 29, 1977 (age 49)
- Education: College of William and Mary (BS); University of Arizona (MD)
- Occupations: Health influencer; former psychiatrist
- Known for: Promoting pseudoscientific claims on human health and diet

Paul Saladino (born June 29, 1977) is an American influencer and board-certified psychiatrist who promotes pseudoscientific claims regarding human health and diet. Saladino was formerly a leading advocate of the carnivore diet, a strict meat-only fad diet that lacks scientific evidence for its effectiveness. His 2020 book The Carnivore Code is described by The New Yorker as the closest thing the Paleo diet movement has to a manifesto. In it, Saladino described plants as "poison". Saladino later abandoned a strict carnivore diet citing serious side effects, pivoting to promoting a meat heavy diet that also includes fruit and honey. He also advocates for raw milk, despite the lack of evidence for any health benefits, and the known serious health risks of drinking unpasteurized milk.

He posts on social media under the name paulsaladinomd. As of late 2025, his Instagram account has around 2.8 million followers and his TikTok channel over 700K followers. He often appears shirtless in his videos. He has said his Instagram and TikTok accounts have each been banned once.

Saladino is the founder (Note: According to the company website, Saladino is the founder.) of Heart & Soil, (Note: The company name is styled with an ampersand, as "Heart & Soil".)Austin, Texas-based company producing food supplements. Saladino co-owns it with fellow carnivore diet influencer Brian Johnson, known as Liver King. Heart & Soil sells bottles of encapsulated organ meat-based supplement products and liver pills.

== Biography and education ==
Saladino earned a chemistry degree from the College of William and Mary, followed by 6 years spent traveling in North America and New Zealand. He later became a physician assistant and later did training in cardiology, gaining his MD from the University of Arizona in 2015, and completing his residency at the University of Washington in 2019. Saladino has board certification in psychiatry and is a certified "Functional Medicine" practitioner. As of 2022, his license to practice medicine in California was "delinquent" due to not paying fees.

== Advocacy ==
Prior to gaining mainstream attention, Saladino was vegan. As an advocate of the strict meat only carnivore diet, Saladino argued that the diet could "cure everything ranging from depression to autoimmune conditions", and claimed that the diet cured his anxiety and eczema. He transitioned away from a strict carnivore diet by 2020 by adding carbohydrates to his diet, including fruit and honey. While on the carnivore diet, Saladino reported experiencing sleep disturbances, heart palpitations, muscle cramps, and a drop in testosterone levels. He said: "I started to think, maybe long-term ketosis is not great for me" and "probably not a great thing for most humans". Saladino's content often features him vlogging and presenting lifestyle advice and his personal routine, in scenarios varying from supermarket trips to surfing on his Costa Rican estate.

He promotes the consumption of animal organs, claiming they help immunity, gut health, weight loss and bone strength. Saladino has urged his followers to use a bidet instead of toilet paper, claiming that toilet paper is "filled with hormone disrupting compounds" and that he avoids contact with them to "protect" his "hormonal health".

According to Vice.com, during the Coronavirus pandemic, he was increasingly dismissive of the efficacy of vaccines contrary to mainstream scientific opinion, although saying they "may help avoid some severe COVID-19 complications." However, he asserted that "metabolic health" and "natural immunity" are more effective, also against medical consensus.

He described in a 2022 viral video a hygiene regime that eschews the use of shampoo, soap, deodorant and toothpaste in favor of simply water.

He posted a video to his X.com account in May 2024 that promoted feeding "raw dairy" to infants. The post received over 90,000 views and sparked strong backlash before it was removed the following day.

He conducted an interview with United States secretary of health and human services Robert F. Kennedy Jr in the White House in May 2025. In the promotional video, the two men are shown drinking shots of raw milk mixed with glyphosate-free honey.

Saladino is known for his opposition to seed oils.

== Collaborations ==
Saladino describes himself as an "adventure buddy" of another carnivore diet influencer, Anthony Gustin, founder of online food store Perfect Keto. The pair visited the Hadza people of Tanzania in 2022, promoting them as a dietary model; Saladino said "The Hadza are the closest thing we have to a time machine." According to science writer Dorsa Amir, "the idea that the 'correct' diet is an ancient one is also the backbone of fads like the paleo diet, [and] Saladino's carnivore diet." Saladino is the founder of Heart & Soil, an Austin, Texas-based company producing food supplements. Saladino co-owns it with fellow carnivore diet influencer Brian Johnson, known as Liver King. Heart & Soil sells bottles of encapsulated organ meat-based supplement products and liver pills.

He collaborated with California luxury grocery store Erewhon in 2023 on the store's Raw Animal-Based Smoothie, which mixes kefir (fermented milk), along with other ingredients, with beef organs and "Immunomilk" (a product made of freeze-dried cow's colostrum). The raw milk was supplied by California-based Raw Farms, until it switched to pasteurization after tests of its milk turned up positive for H5N1 influenza A virus. Consuming raw animal meat poses a risk of bacterial infection.

== Influence and reception ==
Saladino influenced low carb diet entrepreneur Dave Asprey and celebrity Heidi Montag to begin the carnivore diet. Saladino appeared on Joe Rogan's podcast in 2020, which greatly expanded his audience and profile. Alexei Anisin, writing in the journal Food, Culture & Society, has said that Saladino's medical background and "pseudo-academic" style has given his content an air of perceived "scientific authority", while Saladino himself remains personally accessible to viewers, which, in combination with the high production quality of his videos, has led his viewers to trust him. Hafiz Rashid of The New Republic has described Saladino as an "infamous pseudoscience health influencer".

Science communicator Joseph A. Schwarcz, in reference to a claim by Saladino that "eating a serving of McDonald’s fries is equivalent to smoking a pack of 25 cigarettes", has said: "Fearmongering has become an industry, and Saladino is a head honcho in this arena. The usual technique [for Saladino] is to pick a scientific study that finds some risk and then exaggerate it without taking into account type and extent of exposure." Schwarcz says that Saladino "thinks that lamb testicles and raw liver are healthy, and cruciferous vegetables like broccoli, Brussels sprouts, chard and kale are 'bulls–t.' These, Saladino says, should be avoided because 'once chewed they produce sulforaphane, which is toxic to humans.' Actually, sulforaphane has been shown to be an anti-carcinogen".
