= Megan Rossi =

Australian dietician (born 1988)

- Born: 10 October 1988 (age 37); Cairns, Australia
- Education: University of Queensland (PhD)
- Occupation: Dietitian

Megan Rossi (born 10 October 1988) is a dietitian, nutritionist and author specialising in the microbiome. Her PhD in gut health received the Dean's Award top 5% for Outstanding Research Higher Degree.

Rossi founded the website The Gut Health Doctor, including The Gut Health Clinic. In 2019, she co-founded Bio&Me a food range in the UK. In 2025, she founded SMART STRAINS, a range of clinically proven live bacteria products with clean labelling. She is an advocate and researcher of plant-based nutrition.

== Early life and education ==
One of three children, Rossi was raised by her single mother, a science teacher, on a farm near Cairns in rural Australia.

Rossi studied Dietetics at Queensland University of Technology from 2006 to 2009. After receiving first-class honours, she went on to conduct more research into the field while working as a dietitian at Princess Alexandra Hospital, Brisbane. In 2014, she earned her PhD in gut health from the University of Queensland while also working as a nutritionist for the Australia Olympic Synchronised Swimming team.

Rossi moved to London, UK in 2015, where she lives with her husband Thomas and her sons Archie and Cooper.

== Career ==
=== Research fellow ===
Rossi is a Research Fellow at King's College London looking at nutrition-based therapies in gut health, including prebiotics and probiotics, dietary fibres, plant-based diversity, the low-FODMAP diet and food additives. She has published over 50 scientific papers in International peer-reviewed journals.

=== The Gut Health Doctor ===
In 2017, Rossi established an online presence as The Gut Health Doctor (@theguthealthdoctor with over 600,000 followers across various social media platforms), with a focus on linking gut health with other health concerns such as mental health, heart disease, kidney disease and skin conditions.

=== The Gut Health Clinic ===
Rossi founded The Gut Health Clinic, which includes a team of gut specialist dietitians, for clinical conditions such as IBS, IBD, coeliac disease and other gut disorders, as well as weight management, diabetes, cancer and women's health.

=== Bio&Me ===
Rossi co-founded Bio&Me in 2019, a food range with a focus on gut health. The company was named UK Future Brand of the Year 2021, has won several Great Taste Awards, and has received investment from Harry Kane. The company achieved B Corp Status in 2022.

=== SMART STRAINS ===
Rossi founded SMART STRAINS in 2025, clinically proven live bacteria supplement range backed by international health guidelines.

=== Awards ===
- 2017 British Medical Journal Open Gastroenterology prize 'Best clinical science abstract for oral presentation'.
- 2017 British Nutrition Foundation 'Drummond Pump Priming Award'. (presented by Princess Royal, Princess Anne).
- 2019 Business Insider's Top 100 Coolest People in Food & Drink.
- 2020 Young Australian Achiever of the Year in the UK, from the Australian High Commission for her contribution to science and public education.
- 2023 LDC Top 50 Most Ambitious Business Leaders
- 2024 Hurun UK Under 35s Young Entrepreneurs to Watch

== Plant-based nutrition ==
Rossi has noted that there are a number of different plant-based diets including veganism, lacto-vegetarianism, lacto-ovo vegetarianism, pescetarianism and flexitarianism. She has stated that a plant-based diet does not have to be vegan and can occasionally include meat but the bulk of the diet must be built around plant foods. Rossi has commented that she does not personally promote a vegan or vegetarian diet. Her advice is to eat more plants but not eliminate entire food groups. According to Rossi, "including some animal foods in your diet can be a valuable way to decrease your risk of nutritional deficiencies - I am in no way antimeat". She has criticized plant-based junk and processed foods, including vegan cheese for degraded nutrients.

Rossi has argued that a plant-based diet is the opposite of a fad diet, it is a sustainable way to eat a healthy diet. She has stated that the main focus of a plant-based diet should be on whole foods, including whole grains, fruit, vegetables, legumes, nuts and seeds. Rossi has suggested that gut health is about moderation and plant diversity and that the ultimate goal should be to eat 30 different types of plant-based foods every week. She says that the 5 A Day rule is a good starting point but the microbes living in the gut need a diversity of plants to flourish.

=== Eat Yourself Healthy (Love Your Gut) ===
Rossi's debut book, Eat Yourself Healthy (UK, Australia & Europe) and Love Your Gut (US & Canada), was published in September 2019. The book features recipes and advice on IBS and bloating, diagnosing food intolerances, and the relationship between gut health, sleep and exercise. The book was dedicated to her older sister, Justine, who died aged 5 in a playground accident. It was a Sunday Times bestseller and has been published in 4 languages to date.

=== Eat More, Live Well ===
Rossi's book Eat More, Live Well was published in 2021 by Penguin Books and was also a Sunday Times bestseller. The book suggests eating 30 different plant-based foods a week. The editors of the book commented that "based on the latest gut-health science, all of the recipes are packed with plants, but you’ll still find meat, dairy and eggs in there, because it’s all about diversity—eating more, not less. Megan’s love of food shines through every page and we can’t wait to see people enjoying her tasty creations".

== Media ==
=== TV ===
- Rossi has a regular gut health segment on ITV's This Morning show.
- Appeared on 'Dr Xand's Con or Cure' (2023 and 2024) on BBC 1.
- She has also appeared on Lorraine, BBC Morning Live, ITV Tonight (2020), Sky News and ITV's What You Need To Know.

=== News Media ===
- From 2022-2023, Rossi had a weekly column in The Daily Mail.
- She appears on BBC Radio 4 Inside Science and, the Chris Evans Breakfast Show on Virgin Radio.
- She contributes to the Guardian, the Telegraph, Marie Claire and Stylist magazine.
- She regularly delivers keynote presentations at New Scientist Live and other health conferences.

=== Podcasts ===
- Rossi appears on Stompcast, The Power Hour and The Doctor’s Kitchen.
- She has also appeared on TED Health, Feel Better Live More, The Mid•Point, Slo Mo.

== Selected publications ==
- Eat Yourself Healthy: An Easy-to-Digest Guide to Health and Happiness from the Inside Out (Penguin Life, 2019) ISBN 978-0241355084
- Love Your Gut: Supercharge Your Digestive Health and Transform Your Well-Being from the Inside Out (The Experiment, 2021) ISBN 9781615197064
- Eat More, Live Well: Enjoy Your Favourite Food and Boost Your Gut Health with The Diversity Diet (Penguin Life, 2021) ISBN 978-0241480465
- How to Eat More Plants: Transform Your Health With 30 Plant-Based Foods Per Week (And Why It’s Easier Than You Think) (The Experiment, 2022) ISBN 978-1615198788
