= Jason Silva =

Venezuelan-American television personality (born 1982)

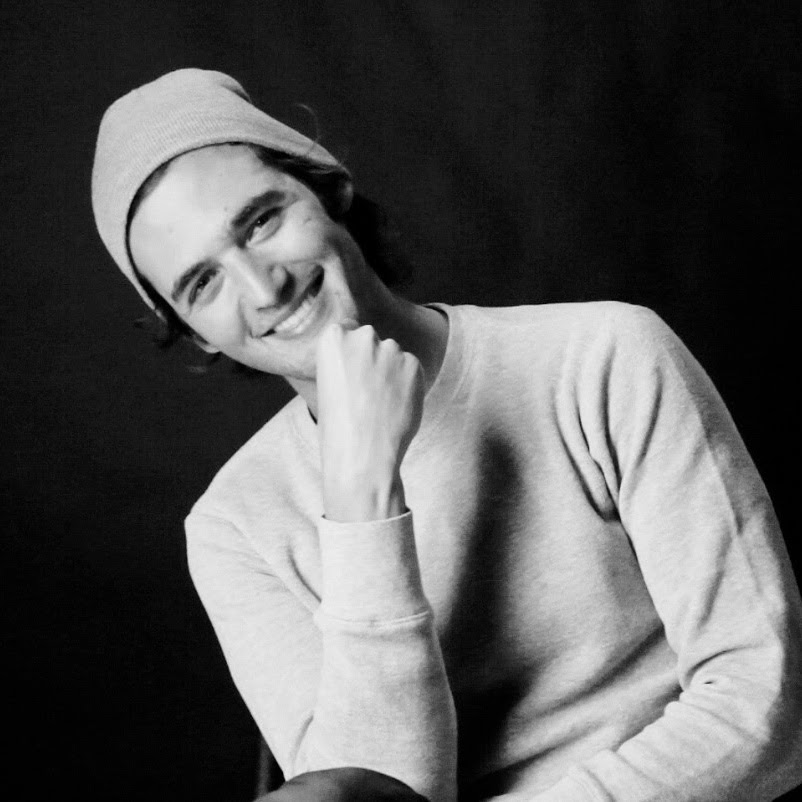
- Born: Jason Luis Silva Mishkin; February 6, 1982 (age 44); Caracas, Venezuela
- Education: University of Miami
- Occupations: television personality; filmmaker; futurist; speaker

Jason Luis Silva Mishkin (born February 6, 1982) is a Venezuelan-born American television personality, short filmmaker, futurist, and public speaker. He is known for hosting the National Geographic documentaries Brain Games and Origins. He has stated that his goal is to use technology to excite people about philosophy and science. The Atlantic describes Silva as "A Timothy Leary of the Viral Video Age". Silva writes and produces short films, is a former presenter on Current TV, and lectures internationally on such topics as creativity, spirituality, technology, and humanity.

He believes in transhumanism and that biology will eventually "become...an information technology".

== Early life and education ==
Silva was born on February 6, 1982 in Caracas, Venezuela. His mother, Linda Mishkin, an artist, is Ashkenazi Jewish. His father, Luis Manuel Silva and whose name is typically Portuguese, converted to Judaism, but, according to Silva, they were secular and lived in a household "more akin to a Woody Allen film" with "a lot of humor, a love of art... and theater". He is also brother to Jordan Silva and Paulina Silva.

As described by Silva in interview, he was inspired by Charles Baudelaire's Hashish House to host "salons" at his house as a teenager to discuss ideas, and it was there that his obsession with filmmaking and documentation began. As he describes it, video rather than pen became his preferred way to memorialize what, in that time, he saw as "ecstatic moments". In response to criticism that he has received "for being overly expository... the equivalent of a voice-over narrator", it's Silva's expressed view that "it's not enough to feel the experience; it needs to be narrated in real time".

Silva earned a degree in film and philosophy from the University of Miami. There, he and Max Lugavere produced and starred in a video documentary/performance piece entitled Textures of Selfhood. The short film is "an experimental film about hedonism and spirituality"—described as being based on Silva's and Lugavere's lives in Miami—and it gained the attention of the Al Gore-Joel Hyatt station, Current TV, who, in Silva's words, were looking for "passionate storytellers".

== Career ==
Silva is television personality, filmmaker, futurist, and public speaker; he uses television, online media, and lecture halls to share his perspectives. For example, in the video The Mirroring Mind, Silva "explores human consciousness and the creation of that consciousness through self-reference." He describes himself as a "wonder junkie" and as a "performance philosopher", a term he first heard on a website called Space Collective by Rene Daalder.

=== Public speaking ===
Silva has spoken at Google, The Economist Ideas Festival, the DLD Digital Life Design Conference in Munich, TEDGlobal, the Singularity Summit, the PSFK Conference, and the Festival of Dangerous Ideas.

At TEDGlobal in June 2012, Silva premiered a short video entitled "Radical Openness". In September 2012, Silva presented his Radical Openness videos at the opening keynote at Microsoft TechEd Australia. Radical Openness was also featured in his presentation at La Ciudad de las Ideas conference on November 10, 2012.

In September 2012, he presented "We Are the Gods Now" at the Festival of Dangerous Ideas.

== Television ==
=== Current TV ===
From 2005 to 2011, Silva was a presenter and producer on Al Gore's cable network Current TV.

=== Brain Games ===
In 2013, Silva and Apollo Robbins became the hosts of Brain Games on the National Geographic Channel. The show explores the brain through interactive games that look at perception, decision-making, and patterning, as well as how easily the brain can be fooled. Experts in psychology, cognitive science and neuroscience appear on the show, as Silva states, "to make sure we're doing the science right." The show, which premiered in 2011, received 1.5 million viewers for episodes one and two and set a National Geographic record as the highest rated series launch in that channel's history.

The experience of being tricked or fooled or made aware of a shortcoming makes you curious. It makes you kind of get up from your seat a little bit and be like 'How did that work?'

— Jason Silva

=== Origins: The Journey of Humankind ===
Released in 2017 as a part of the National Geographic Channel, Silva hosted this short series. Origins explores the very beginning of mankind and rewinds all the way back to the beginning, tracing the innovations that made us modern. The series features 8 episodes of approximately 45 minutes running time each, and as of this date, only a commitment to one season of Origins has been reported.

=== Guest appearances ===
In August 2012, he appeared on CBS This Morning. In September 2012, he appeared on Australian ABC program Q&A. He has appeared as a guest on Season 2 of StarTalk.

== Original internet content ==
=== "Shots of Awe" ===
In May 2013, Jason began "Shots of Awe", a YouTube channel on the Discovery Digital Networks TestTube, presenting weekly "micro-documentaries" on creativity, innovation, exponential technology, futurism, metaphysics, existentialism and the human condition. Zoltan Istvan, editor for the Huffington Post, wrote that Shots of Awe is a blend of philosophy and art and has been massively popular to the younger generation.

=== Other appearances ===
In October 2013, Silva appeared on YouTube for Google and NASA's Quantum Artificial Intelligence Lab. He has appeared multiple times as a guest on the Joe Rogan Experience podcast.

In March 2014, he was a guest in an episode of SourceFed's Tabletalk. In December 2017, he appeared as a guest host on the trivia app HQ Trivia.

=== Other accomplishments ===
Silva has been featured in The Atlantic, The Economist, Vanity Fair, Forbes, Wired, and many others.

In 2011, he became a fellow at the Hybrid Reality Institute, examining the symbiosis between man and machine.

His film Attention: The Immersive Power of Cinema was part of the exhibition 'Kino und der kinamatografische Blick' ('Cinema and the cinematographic gaze'), 20 March - 2 June 2013, at MEWO Kunsthalle in Memmingen (Germany).

In 2014, Silva was an advisor for National Geographic Channel's Expedition Granted competition in which finalists are chosen based on their project's originality, viability and potential impact on either the local or global community.

Silva has a chapter giving advice in Tim Ferriss' book Tools of Titans.

== Conferences and lectures ==
- "Critical Crossroads" at the TEDGlobal 2012 "Radical Openness" Conference, Edinburgh Scotland (June 2012)
- "Radical Openness" at the Zeitgeist Media Festival 2012, Los Angeles, with James Cromwell and Rutger Hauer
- The Mirroring Mind SXSW, Austin, Texas (March 2013)
- Jason Silva: Technologies of Immersion Tribeca Film Festival "Future of Film Series", New York, NY (2014)
- "Innovation and Thinking Differently" at the Rockwell Lecture Series, Cullen Performance Hall, University of Houston (October 2015)
- Keynote at the LiNC'16 (Lithium Networking Conference), San Francisco (June 2016)
- Teradata Partners 2017, General Session Keynote, October 25, 2017, Anaheim, California.

== Personal life ==
Silva lives in Amsterdam.
