= Carnivore diet =

Meat-only human diet

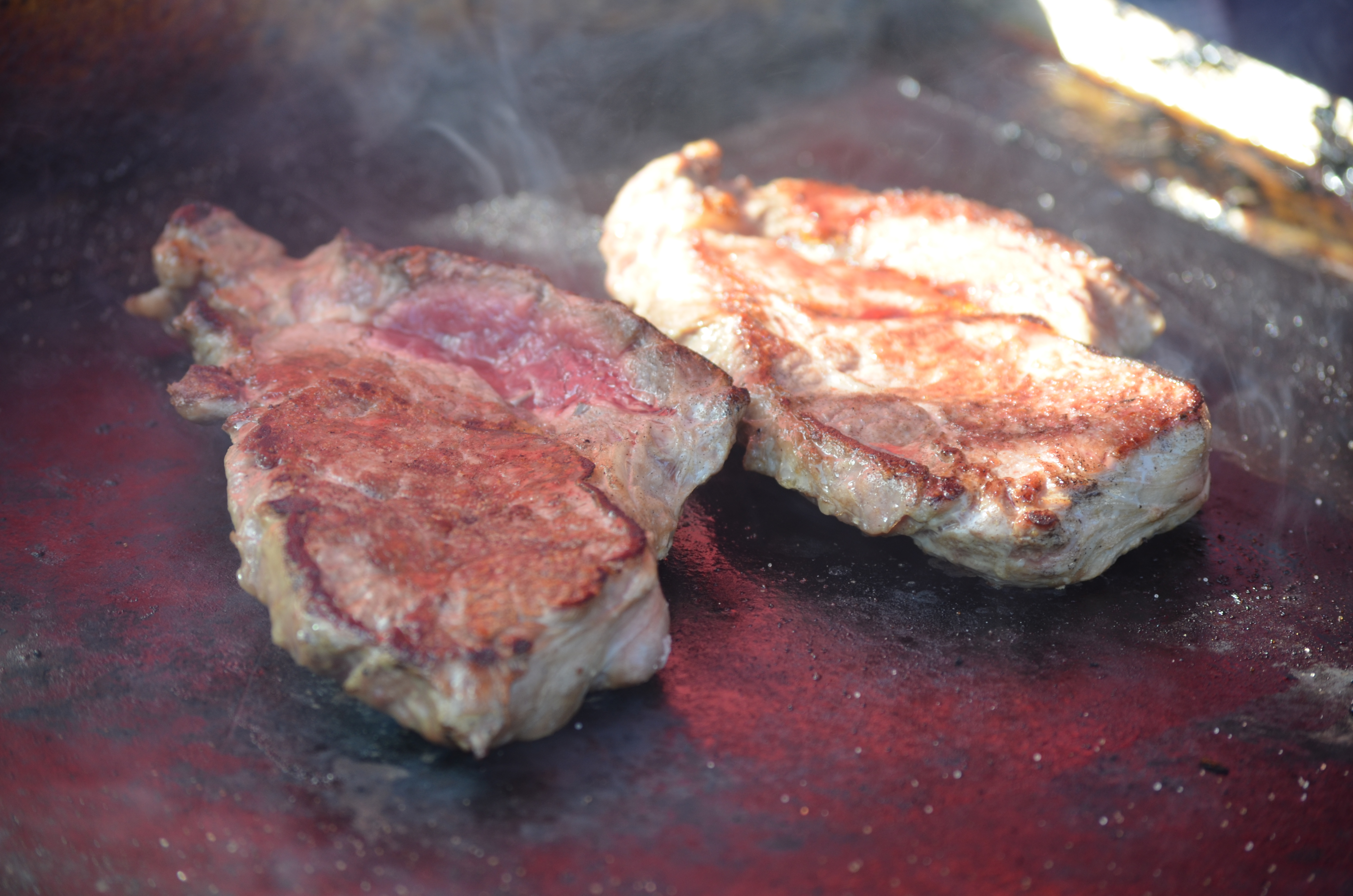
Beefsteak, a core food across many variants of the carnivore diet

The carnivore diet (also called a zero carb diet) is a high-protein, low-carbohydrates fad diet in which only animal products such as meat, dairy and eggs are consumed. The carnivore diet is associated with pseudoscientific health claims. The diet lacks dietary fiber, can lead to deficiencies of vitamins, and can increase the risk of chronic diseases. The lion diet is a highly restrictive form of the carnivore diet, in which only beef is eaten. A modification inspired by the carnivore diet is the animal-based diet in which fruit, honey and raw dairy are added.

== History ==
The idea of an exclusive meat diet can be traced to the German writer Bernard Moncriff, author of The Philosophy of the Stomach: Or, An Exclusively Animal Diet in 1856, who spent a year living on only beef and milk. In the 1870s, Italian physician Arnaldo Cantani prescribed his diabetic patients an exclusive animal-based diet. In the 1880s an American, James H. Salisbury, advocated a meat diet consisting of 2 to 4 pounds of lean beef and 3 to 5 pints of hot water daily for 4 to 12 weeks. It became known as the meat and hot water diet, or Salisbury diet.

In 2018, the carnivore diet was promoted on social media by former orthopaedic surgeon Shawn Baker, who wrote the book The Carnivore Diet. Jordan Peterson and his daughter Mikhaila were also vocal adherents of this diet. Peterson and his daughter follow a strict type of carnivore diet termed the lion diet, in which only beef, salt, and water are consumed. The 'lion diet' became a viral fad on TikTok.

In April 2023, skeptic and neurologist Steven Novella described the carnivore diet as the latest fad diet to have achieved popularity. Because of its high cost Novella described the diet as one for "select elites", adding what he said was a further unsavory aspect to its harmful and pseudoscientific basis. The carnivore diet advertised by meat influencers on social media platforms has been described as a fringe movement.

Another position within the carnivore community has been labelled carnivore traditionalism which argues that "It's not the cow, it's the how". Carnivore traditionalism defends livestock raised through "regenerative" methods and encourages the consumption of vast amounts of eggs and grass-fed beef from small traditional farms in opposition to industrial livestock production.

Because of its restrictive nature, some carnivore diet advocates have since switched to an animal-based diet that allows limited plant foods. The animal-based diet popularized by Paul Saladino in 2024 is based on red meat but allows fruit, honey and raw dairy. Raw Egg Nationalist, a far-right influencer, has promoted a raw food version of the animal-based diet.

== Diet ==
People following a carnivore diet consume high-protein animal-based products, such as beef, pork, poultry, and seafood. Some may eat dairy products and eggs. All fruits, legumes, vegetables, grains, nuts and seeds are strictly excluded.

The carnivore diet is often confused with Inuit cuisine. Primary differences include a high proportion of organs in the Inuit diet, high seafood content, and consumption of raw meat, all of which are not typical for the fad carnivore diet. Inuit cuisine is also not exclusively composed of animal products, as the Inuit would consume plant products they acquired from gathering.

== Health concerns ==
Nutritional scientists dismiss the carnivore diet as an extreme fad diet, which has attracted criticism from dietitians and physicians as being potentially dangerous to health (see Meat § Health effects). It is dismissed as a fad diet by professional dietetic organizations such as the British Dietetic Association and Dietitians Australia.

It also raises levels of LDL cholesterol, which increases the risk of cardiovascular disease. Carnivore diets exclude fruits and vegetables which supply micronutrients. They are also low in dietary fiber, possibly causing constipation. A carnivore diet high in red meat increases the risks of colon cancer and gout. The high protein intake of a carnivore diet can lead to impaired kidney function.

== Environmental impact ==
Criticism also derives from concerns about greenhouse gas emissions associated with large-scale livestock farming required to produce meats commercially, and the potential for such emissions to worsen climate change (see environmental impact of meat production).

== See also ==
- Atkins diet
- Lectin-free diet
- Monotrophic diet
- Paleo diet
- Raw foodism
