= List of diet food and fad diet creators =

This is a list of notable individuals associated with the creation of a diet food or fad diet.

== List ==
Creator	Creation	Sources
Arthur Agatston	South Beach Diet	
Robert Atkins	Atkins diet	
Samm Sinclair Baker	Scarsdale diet	
William Banting	Letter on Corpulence, Addressed to The Public	
Jenny Craig	Jenny Craig, Inc.	
Pierre Dukan	Dukan Diet	
Stuart Fischer	The Park Avenue Diet	
Joel Fuhrman	Nutritarian diet	
C. Joseph Genster	Metrecal	
Sylvester Graham	Graham diet	
Steven Gundry	Lectin-free diet	
William Howard Hay	Hay diet	
Jasmuheen	Breatharianism diet	
John Harvey Kellogg	Ready-to-eat cereals	
Valter Longo	Fasting mimicking diet	
Ian Marber	The Food Doctor	
Judy Mazel	Beverly Hills Diet	
Gillian McKeith	You Are What You Eat	
Michel Montignac	Montignac diet	
George Ohsawa	Macrobiotic diet	
Henry Perky	Shredded wheat	
Nathan Pritikin	Pritikin diet	
Seth Roberts	The Shangri-La Diet	
Barry Sears	Zone diet	
Ian K. Smith	The Fat Smash Diet	
Irwin Stillman	Stillman diet	
Herman Tarnower	Scarsdale diet	
David Zinczenko	The Super Metabolism Diet	
