= Marber =

Marber is a surname. Notable people with the surname include:

- Andreas Marber (born 1961), German playwright and dramaturge
- Ian Marber (born 1963), nutrition therapist and author
- Patrick Marber (born 1964), English comedian, playwright, director, puppeteer, actor and screenwriter
- Romek Marber (1925–2020), Polish freelance designer
