= High-protein diet =

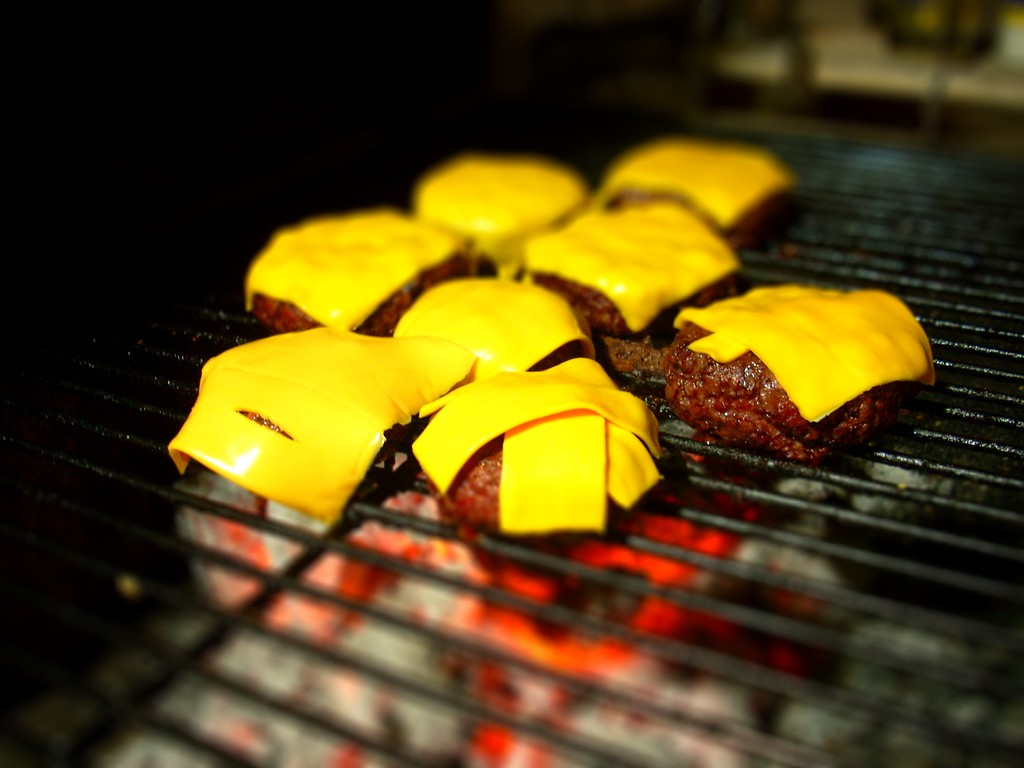
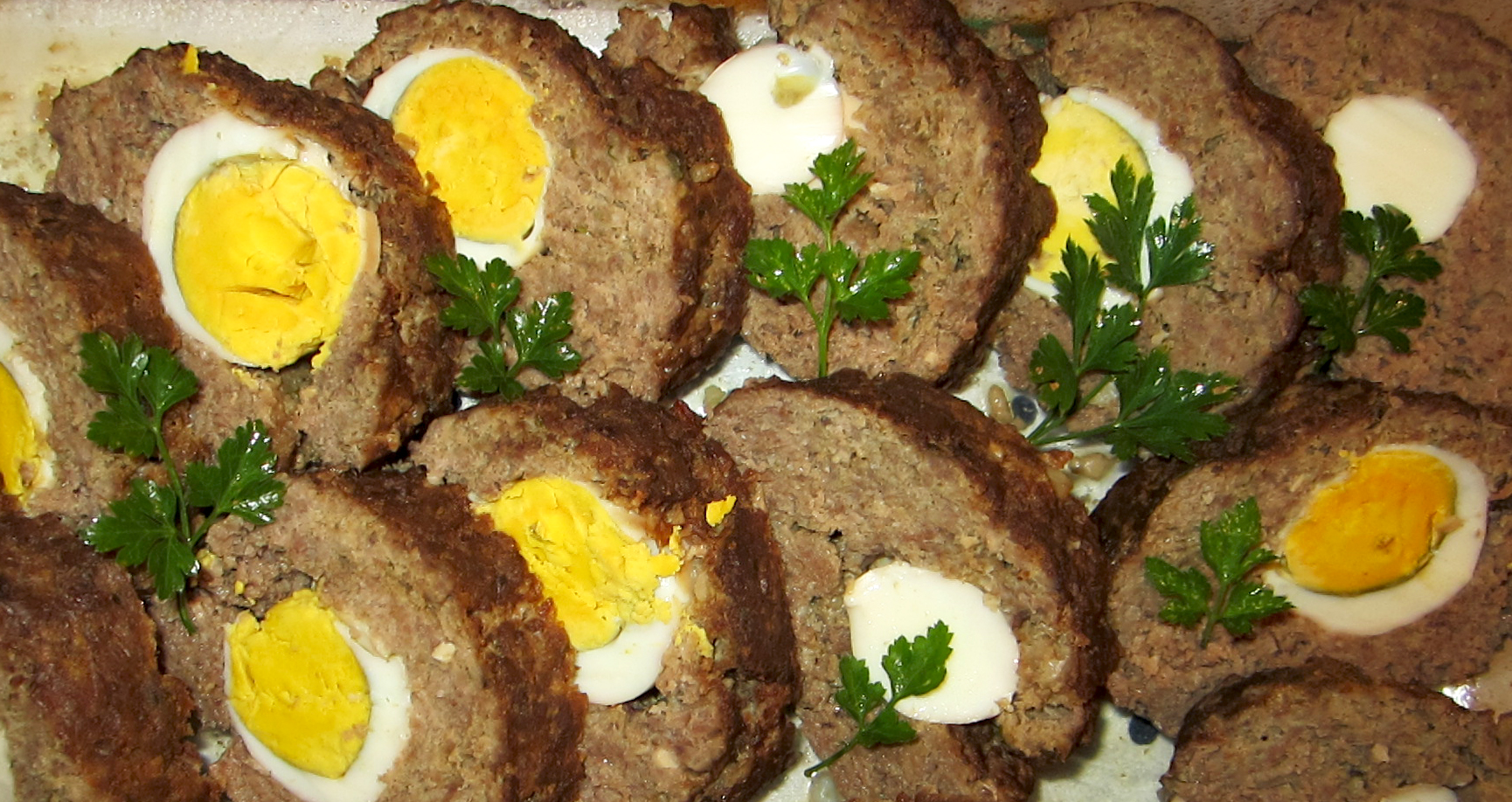
High-protein diets are usually rich in meat, dairy products and eggs.

A high-protein diet is a diet in which 40% or more of the total daily calories come from protein. Many high protein diets are high in saturated fat and restrict intake of carbohydrates.

Example foods in a high-protein diet include lean beef, chicken or poultry, pork, salmon and tuna, eggs, and soy. High-protein diets are often utilized in the context of fat loss and muscle building. High-protein fad diets, such as the Atkins diet and Protein Power, have been criticized for promoting misconceptions about carbohydrates, insulin resistance and ketosis.

== Health effects ==
There is dispute among researchers about the efficacy and safety of various high-protein diets.

=== Efficiency ===
Increased protein consumption is shown to increase muscle mass, improve muscle adaptations to resistance training, and reduce muscle loss in periods of energy and nutrient deficit. High-protein low-calorie diets are often used in the setting of treating obesity. A high-protein diet does not significantly improve blood pressure and glycemic control in people with type 2 diabetes.

=== Safety ===
In 2001, the American Heart Association's Nutrition Committee issued a recommendation against some high-protein diets such as the Atkins diet and Protein Power. The committee noted potential health risks of these diets and how there are no long-term scientific studies to support their efficacy and safety.

A 2017 review indicated that a high-protein diet (superior to 1.5 g per kilogram of ideal body weight per day) may contribute to life-long risk of kidney damage, including progression of or potentially new onset chronic kidney disease. Though, a 2023 umbrella review found no evidence that higher protein intake (> 0.8 g/kg body weight/day) does specifically trigger CKD. According to the American Heart Association, high-protein diets that contain high amounts of saturated fat increase risk of coronary artery disease and cancer.

The following are examples of high-protein fad diets:

- Atkins diet
- Dukan Diet
- Montignac diet
- Protein Power
- Scarsdale diet
- Stillman diet
- Sugar Busters!
- Zone diet
- Protein-sparing modified fast (diet)

== See also ==
- List of foods by protein content
- Bodybuilding supplement
- Dietary supplement
- Human nutrition
- List of diets
- Low-protein diet
- Nutrition
