= Masquerade (theatre group) =

Masquerade - the Performance Group is a Chennai based English theatre group. It is one of the few theatre groups in Chennai that survive without commercial financial sponsorship or funding from business houses or the likes, backed by public faith and smaller donorships from patrons, parents of tweens and teens who pay for training workshops. Public performances are rarely priced and income from performances are invariably through hat collections, done consciously as a tool to gauge audience appreciation of the show.

Since 2000, the group has been extensively working with youth both at schools and through private workshops. Since 2009, through its youth & teen theatre initiative, Masquerade Youth Theatre (MYT), Masquerade has been conducting Camp Neuve, an annual three week summer workshop that trains teens between ages 13 and 19 years. This leads to an eventual production featuring the workshop participants. Since 2009, through its The Bear and Beanbag Children's Theatre, the group has also been involved in presenting story performance sessions to tweens ages 7 to 11, and in conducting theatre and story telling workshops for children in conjunction with hobby centers and after-school experience centers in Chennai.

== Company history ==
=== The early years ===
Masquerade - the Performance Group was conceived in 1993 and launched in June 1994. It debuted with its first performance of Hugo von Hofmannsthal's Elektra (English translation) at Sittrarangam, a little thatched-roof performance structure inside the Island Grounds that overlooks the War Memorial, near Anna Square.

Founded on the lawns of Max Mueller Bhavan (Chennai), at the Bhavan's Khader Nawaz Khan Road erstwhile premises, the group was a result of six individuals from various walks of society ranging from ballet dancing to accountancy, costume designing to teaching and research and their common passion towards live theatre art. In a city where English theatre happened originally among a few high-in-the-social ladder aficionado of theatre art then, Masquerade, in the company of a few of its ilk aspiring amateur English theatre youth groups, strove to erase an elitist view of English theatre in Chennai.

With inspirational support from the late Herr Klaus Schindler (then Director) and Herr Franz Xaver Augustin (then Language Dept Head) at Max Mueller Bhavan, Chennai, Masquerade's first theatre performance was an experimental adaptation of Austrian playwright Hugo von Hofmannsthal's Elektra. To further foster Masqerade's theatrical vigour, under their artists' support program, Masquerade's Artistic Director, Dr. S. Krishna Kumar, was sponsored to an internship at Oldenburg Staatstheater with ITI Berlin extending an artist stipend. In its early years, during the 1990s, many of Masquerade's productions were German plays performed in English. Besides Hofmannsthal's Elektra (1994), the group added Duerrenmatt's Romulus the Great (Ides of March 1995 production); Incident at Twilight by the same author (September 1994); and a retro trip through modern and contemporary German drama featuring seminal excerpts from Wedekind's Spring Awakening, Buechner's Leonce and Lena, Brecht's Arturo Ui and Botho Strauss's plays (June 1995), Buechner's Leonce and Lena (1997), Guenther Grass's The Plebeians Rehearse Their Uprising (1998) and The Broken Jug (Kleist) to its German-based repertoire.

In the year 1998, the group also produced Bertolt Brecht's two Lehrstuecke - The Measures Taken and He Who Said Yes, He Who Said No. The group predominantly worked on the lawns of Max Mueller Bhavan for its rehearsals during this period. Although the group produced several other works of drama literature from English playwrights, such as Confusions (Alan Ayckbourn) and The Ruffian on the Stair (Joe Orton), during this period, the influence of German literature and theatre is evident in its performance style. This had more to do with its Artistic and Creative Director, Dr. S. Krishna Kumar, who spent major periods of his training and learning in Magdeburg, Berlin and Oldenburg, Germany.

=== The evolution ===
Through the 1990s and the early part of the new millennium, the group had a staggering output of around 50 productions (200+ performances), story performances and performative story readings for children, a vast body of poetry readings in conjunction with the Culture Cafe - British Council, Chennai, and collaborations with virtually every local English and parallel Tamil theatre group. Masquerade's members had also exhaustively lent their hands in support to travelling domestic and international repertories in a technical as well as backstage capacity. In 2003, Masquerade hosted Curtain Raiser's Kandor (from Malta) featuring the duo of Patrick Vella and Claire Agius, who travelled to India from Edinburgh Fringe and performed in Chennai and Cochin.

At the turn of the century, the group had three very notable productions to its credit. Its 1999-2000 production of Alan Bennett's Kafka's Dick, 2000 production of David Mamet's Oleanna and Shakespeare's Twelfth Night (in collaboration with the India's oldest amateur English theatre group the Madras Players, 2002) underlined the group's status of an important English theatre group of the city.

=== The new millennium ===
Later in 2004, 10 years after Masquerade's inception, when the group decided to found Chennai's first youth theatre group Landing Stage, Electra was again the debut performance.

Masquerade has currently completed 28 seasons, 29 years and is stepping into its 30th year; with 180+ productions and more than 900 performances, the group intends to travel in new directions. The group has branched off into supporting the growth of teen and tween theatre activity in the city, with its Masquerade Youth Theatre (2009) and the Bear & Beanbag Children's Theater (2010). The group is striving to establish a niche performance space, catering exclusively for children's theatre in Chennai.

Masquerade was instrumental in setting up and promoting Natak, an inter-collegiate theatre festival. The first season of Natak was in 2000, which saw participants from various city colleges. The following year saw entries from colleges across India. Students were given the platform to design, plan and execute the entire production. Students were provided professional support by the Masquerade team in areas of light and sound design and execution, as well as with backstage support and planning. A stipend was paid to the teams to minimize the financial burden. A standard set of lights and sound equipment, paid for by Masquerade, was made available to the teams in designing their shows.

NATAK gave the first platform for many of Chennai's emerging talent, several of whom are active performers on Chennai's stage as well as its film industry - Kollywood - today. A majority of stage to screen acting talents of today's Tamil film industry have had a brush with Masquerade's theatre oeuvre at some point or other. These include Karthik Kumar (Evam), Karthik Srinivasan (TMK) (Sideways), Shankar Sundaram (the Madras Players), Paul Mathew, Yog Japee (theatre Y), Mathivanan Rajendran & Rajiv Rajaram (Stray Factory) and RJ/TV anchor Jagan. Some of its recent - MYT - products include Amitash Pradhan and Sanant Reddy. Masquerade's main focus is live theatre performances.

Performances are social and community-oriented. Masquerade introduced "Three @ Twenty", a community theatre initiative to promote new writers, in 2006.

An important feature of the group's presence is its celebration of World Theatre Day on 27 March, each year. Since 2002, the group has celebrated the special day with a performance or hosting a production for another company or curating a festival, as they did in 2010 with "ACT 1", a festival of solo performances featuring some of the city's best performers across Tamil, English and Hindi theatre.

In the years of lockdown and COVID19 period, Masquerade hosted regular play reading and voice acting sessions on it Clubhouse channel. It was the 1st company to come out of lockdown in 2021, with its THEATRE UNLOCKED outreach festival in Chennai, in collaboration with Chennai Art Theatre, to help local groups kick-start their journey back.

== Selected productions ==
Year	Title	Author	Language	Notes
2019	Antigone	Sophocles (Hölderlin, Brecht...)	English	March 27 - World Theatre Day presentation at Alliance Francaise de Madras, Chennai
2019	HOUDUNNIT – 3 short comic Thrillers	Gautam Raja, Sujatha Rangarajan, Indira Parthasarathy	English (with minor Tamil words)	(2 February 2019 – Alchemy Black Box, Adyar, Chennai, India)
2018	Parrot’s Lies	Marber. A	English	(March 27, 2018 – Alchemy Black Box, Adyar, Chennai, India) - (World Theatre Day celebratory not-for-profit-community performance)
2017	From Sunset to Sunrise	Surendra Verma	English	October 7 & 8 (7 15 pm) – 2017 at Spaces, Adyar, Chennai, India
2017	28 Down, Eight Letters	Julie A Johnston	English	The Short + Sweet Theatre Festival – South India – July 2017 - Winner of the Best Play of the Week on Week 2 and Best Actor of the Week 2
2017	JANOSCH – The Tiger & Bear Tales for Children (5+ y.o)	Janosch	English	A non-ticketed summer fund event for children
2017	Square Root of Sins Past	Shriram Sivaramakrishnan (our Resident Playwright)	English	Inspired by the Draupati-vastrabarana episode in Mahabharata - on April 1, for World Theatre Day (March) Weekend - at DakshinaChitra, Muttukadu
2016	The Rime of the Ancient Mariner (MYT Devised Production)	S.T. Coleridge (adapted from)	English	A workshop production featuring MYT Teens
2016	A World Theatre Day Rehearsed Performance from The Genesis	The Old Testament	English	World Theatre Day 2016 performance at Spaces, Chennai
2015	Touring Tales – a Story Performance for BnB Children	Krishna Kumar. S	English	Performed at Hippocampus, Adyar, Chennai
2015	Jungle Bungles – a Story Performance for BnB Children	Krishna Kumar. S	English	Performed at Spaces, Besant Nagar, Chennai
2015	A Trip to Panama	Janosch	English	Bookmark, Coimbatore, India (World Theatre Day 2015 Performance for Tweens by Krishna Kumar. S)
2014	The Tearjerker	Krishna Kumar, Dileep Rangan, Arvind Vyaas	Bi-lingual (English & Tamil)	Performed at Spaces & later at Surya Festival, Kerala
2014	The Island	Athol Fugard	English	2014 World Theatre Day event
2013	Over the Table - an evening of monologues for actors	Several	English	
2013	In the Kingdom of Foolish	a folk tale adaptation	Multilingual (English, Tamil & Hindi)	an MYT Production
2013	Mrichchakatika (The Little Clay Cart)	Bhasa	English	2013 World Theatre Day event
2012	A Temporary Matter	Jhumpa Lahiri	English	for The Madras Players at the MPTF 2012 Festival
2012	Vaternalia - short stories adapted for stage	Franz Kafka	English	at Urban Mela, Chennai
2012	Kafkesque - shorts from Kafka for stage	Franz Kafka	English	2012 World Theatre Day event
2011	The Frog Prince		English	
2011	BHOPAL	Rahul Verma	English	
2011	The Wizard of Oz	L. Frank Baum	English	A BnB production for children
2011	"DRAMA-LOG" (Edition 1) - festival of college / campus theatre	VARIOUS	English	in association with Goethe Institut, Chennai
2011 (March)	"Guru Paramartha & His Misadventures"	Krishna Kumar. S	Bilingual (English & Tamil)	an adaptation for stage from Father Beschi (March 2011, at Hippocampus, for World Theatre Day)
2010	Brer Rabbit Chronicles (adaptation from Enid Blyton)	a free workshop adaptation	English	an MYT Production (June 2010)
2010	Bloodlines - A Tudor Story	Krishna Kumar & Ramya Mukund	English	March 2010
2010	Arjumand - the story of Taj	Krishna Kumar & Shakila	English	March 2010
2010	Incestuous Bastard, a.k.a. Zeus' Lovers	Krishna Kumar & Anjana Menon	English	March 2010
2010	The Coffin is Too Big for the Hole	Kuo Pao Kun	English	March 2010
2010	Act 1 - A Festival of SOLO Performances	Multiple	English, Tamil & Hindi	World Theatre Day 2010 event
2009	Women in Black - 1 Comedy		English	(September 2009)
2009	Dystopia	adapted by Mathivanan Rajendran	English	(August 2009)
2009	Charandas Chor	Habib Tanvir	English	an MYT Production (July 2009)
2009	JigSaw	Multiple Authors	English	World Theatre Day weekend event (March 2009)
2008	The Truth	Mohan Narayanan	English	World Theatre Day weekend event
2007	Thus Spake Shoorpanaka, So Said Shakuni	Poile Sengupta	English	World Theatre Day weekend event
2006	Wood	Gautam Raja	English	as part of Gautam's Three
2006	Parrots Lies	Andreas Marber	English	as part of Gautam's Three
2006	Deep Freeze	Gautam Raja	English	as part of Gautam's Three
2006	Pub Crawl	Gautam Raja	English	as part of Gautam's Three
2006	Damini the Damager	Gautam Raja	English	as part of Gautam's Three
2005	A Midsummer Night's Dream	William Shakespeare	English	
2001-02	Twelfth Night	William Shakespeare	English	
1999-2000	Kafka's Dick	Alan Bennett	English	
1999	Medea	Euripides	English	
1998	The Measures Taken & He Who Said Yes, He Who Said No	Bertolt Brecht	English	
1997	Leonce and Lena	Georg Buechner	English	
1995	Romulus the Great	Friedrich Duerrenmatt	English	
1994	Incident at Twilight	Friedrich Duerrenmatt	English	
1994	Elektra	Hugo von Hofmannsthal	English	
