= Herman Tarnower =

American cardiologist and author (1910–1980)

- Born: Herman Tarnower; March 18, 1910; New York City, U.S.
- Died: March 10, 1980 (aged 69); Purchase, New York, U.S.
- Cause of death: Gunshot wounds
- Education: Syracuse University
- Occupations: Cardiologist, writer
- Notable work: The Complete Scarsdale Medical Diet
- Partner: Jean Harris (1966–1980)

Herman Tarnower (March 18, 1910 – March 10, 1980) was an American cardiologist and co-author (with Samm Sinclair Baker) of the bestselling diet book The Complete Scarsdale Medical Diet (1978), which promoted a high-protein low-carbohydrate fad diet known as the Scarsdale diet. On March 10, 1980, just eight days before his 70th birthday, Tarnower was shot dead by Jean Harris. Harris was convicted of his murder at trial in White Plains, New York, in 1981.

== Early and professional life ==
Herman Tarnower was born in Brooklyn, New York, to Jewish immigrants Harry and Dora Tarnower. He attended Syracuse University, where he obtained his M.D. in 1933. As a physician he specialized in cardiology, establishing a practice in the Scarsdale and White Plains areas of New York. During World War II, Tarnower joined the United States Army Medical Corps and was promoted to the rank of major. After the war, he initiated the Scarsdale Medical Center and became regarded among his colleagues and patients. From 1975 until his death, Tarnower was clinical professor of medicine at the New York Medical College.

The Scarsdale diet's idea of reducing carbohydrates, eating plenty of oily fish and lean meat with fruit and vegetables and having a low intake of fats, salt and sweets was novel at the time, and Tarnower's book promoting it became an immediate bestseller when it was published in 1979. However, the diet was criticized by Henry Buchwald and others for "serious nutritional deficiencies". Negative effects of the diet include constipation, nausea, weakness and bad breath due to ketosis. In present times, the Scarsdale diet is often listed as an example of a fad diet.

== Death ==
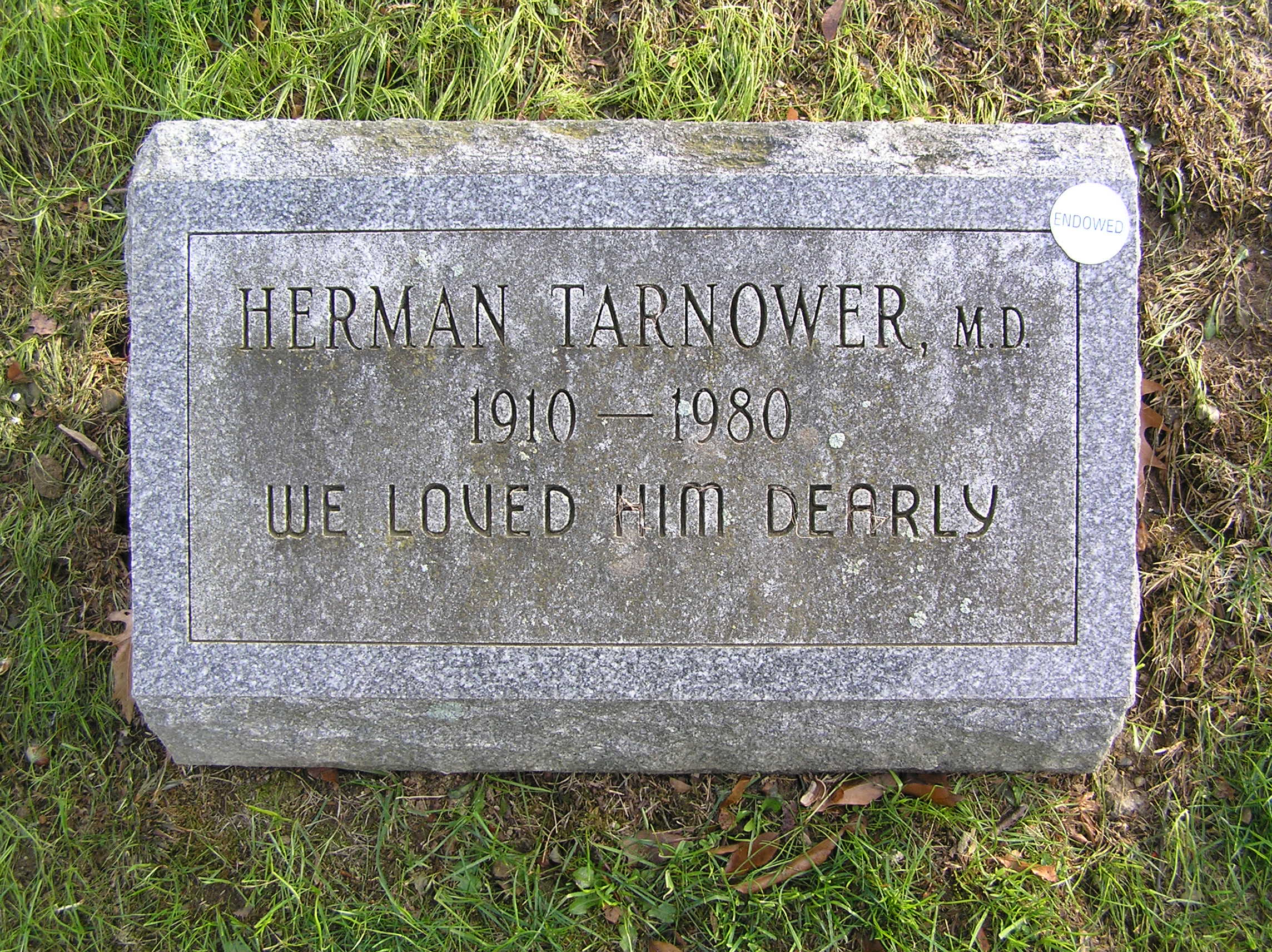
Gravesite of Herman Tarnower

Tarnower began a relationship with divorcée Jean Harris in 1966. A lifelong bachelor, he continued to date other women during the course of their relationship. In 1979, he was having an affair with Lynne Tryforos, who worked as a secretary in his office. This caused tension between him and Harris, although Harris stated that the affair with Tryforos had been taking place for the preceding few years.

On March 10, 1980, Harris drove from the Madeira School in McLean, Virginia, to Tarnower's home in Purchase, New York, with a .32 caliber pistol in her possession. At trial, she stated she had planned to commit suicide after talking in person with Tarnower one last time. When she arrived at the house, however, she noticed Tryforos' lingerie in the bedroom. An argument ensued, and Tarnower allegedly said to her, "Jesus, Jean, you're crazy! Get out of here!" Harris shot Tarnower four times at close range, killing him. She was arrested and tried for second-degree murder, claiming at the three-month trial that the gun had discharged accidentally while Tarnower tried to wrestle it away from her. The jury did not believe her testimony and convicted her of murder in 1981. Judge Russell Leggett sentenced Harris to the minimum of 15-years-to-life in prison. However, she was granted clemency by New York Governor Mario Cuomo in 1992 and paroled in 1993.

Tarnower was interred on a sloping hill in the Larchmont Temple section of Mount Hope Cemetery in Hastings-on-Hudson, New York.

== In media ==
- In the movie Mrs. Harris (2005), Ben Kingsley and Annette Bening starred as the couple
- In the Seinfeld episode "The Summer of George", Kramer is mistakenly awarded a Tony for Scarsdale Surprise, a fictional musical about the murder of Herman Tarnower.
- In a 2016 episode of Murder Made Me Famous entitled "Jean Harris", Tarnower was portrayed by actor Steve Brudniak, and Jean Harris portrayed by actress Mollie Milligan.
