= You Are What You Eat =

UK dieting television series

- Genre: Documentary
- Starring: Trisha Goddard (2022); Amir Khan (2022); Gillian McKeith (2004–2006)
- Narrated by: Paul Shelley (2004–2006); Trisha Goddard (2022)
- Country of origin: United Kingdom
- Original language: English
- No. of series: 5
- No. of episodes: Unknown (Channel 4 Series); 6 (Channel 5 Series)

Production
- Executive producers: Murray Boland (2022); Dermot Caulfield (2022); Danielle Lux (2022)
- Running time: 30 minutes (2004–2006); 60 minutes (2006, 2022)
- Production company: CPL Productions (Note: Known as Celador Productions during the original series' run.)

Original release
- Network: Channel 4
- Release: 29 June 2004 – 18 October 2006
- Network: Channel 5
- Release: 5 January – 9 February 2022

You Are What You Eat is a British dieting programme presented by Trisha Goddard and Amir Khan that broadcasts on Channel 5. The show was originally broadcast on Channel 4, before moving to Channel 5 in 2022 for its revived series. Both the Channel 4 and Channel 5 versions of the show were produced by CPL Productions (formerly Celador Productions).

The show originally ran from 2004 until 2006 on Channel 4 with controversial host Gillian McKeith. On 5 March 2021 it was confirmed the show would be revived with Goddard and Khan replacing McKeith as host, with the first episode of the new series broadcast back-to-back on Channel 5 with Dr Amir's How To Give Up Sugar (and Lose Weight) (also known as Dr Amir's Sugar Crash) on 5 January 2022.

You Are What You Eat was also the title of an American film from 1968. The phrase "You are what you eat" was first expressed by Ludwig Feuerbach in 1863 (German: Der Mensch ist, was er iszt.).

== Original run ==
The show originally ran for four seasons on Channel 4 with Gillian McKeith as host from 2004 until its cancellation in 2006.

The show often uses shock tactics to get the participants to lose weight. In each episode, all food eaten in one week by the person(s) taking part is placed on a table to highlight problem areas of their diet. Another technique is the analysis of the participant's faeces by McKeith to detect certain problems and make them known to the person involved. This aspect of the show gained McKeith the nickname "The Awful Poo Lady". Emphasising the possibility of the participant's death is sometimes used, with references to children they might not see growing up or a mock grave being prepared. Generally, editions would have these scenes in the first part of the show followed by the participant's attempts to follow McKeith's diet and exercise regimes in the second. The fourth series was expanded from half to one hour programmes, with the contestants moving to McKeith's London house and being visited overnight at their homes for inspection.

== Controversy ==
In the first series of the show, McKeith was sometimes referred to as "Doctor", and she has continued to use the title in some media, although the later series referred to her as a "holistic nutritionist", using the title "Ms. Gillian McKeith" at some points. It emerged in December 2005 that Gillian McKeith has no accredited doctorate. McKeith received her PhD via a distance learning programme from the American Holistic College of Nutrition, Alabama, which later became the Clayton College of Natural Health before closing in 2011. The Clayton College of Natural Health stated that it was "accredited by the American Association of Drugless Practitioners and the American Naturopathic Medical Accreditation Board". However, this accreditation was never recognised by the U.S. Secretary of Education.

McKeith is also a member of the American Association of Nutritional Consultants, a controversial organisation which seeks to enhance the reputation of Nutritional and Dietary Consultants by consolidating them into a professional organisation. It offers examination and certification, or association membership which does not require an examination but requires the payment of the $60 membership fee.

== Revived series ==
On 5 March 2021, it was confirmed that the series would be revived on Channel 5, starting on 5 January 2022 with a 6-episode run with Trisha Goddard and Dr Amir Khan taking over from Gillian McKeith, who presented the original series on Channel 4. On the announcement of the revived series Goddard said "I never looked at any of the previous shows. I’m more into understanding people. TV’s moved on since then. We are more aware now that if someone’s got a problem with food it’s usually a demonstration of something deeper”.

Khan also added in regards to previous host McKeith: "I try to avoid anything she tweets really because we are on very different paths. I didn't watch her shows much. I remember her going into people's houses with a Tupperware of poo and sifting through it and thinking, 'This is gross'. It's a different kind of show this time, I think most people will see that. It's a far more scientific approach. I know through my job that shock tactics don't work. It's about understanding people's lifestyle. One of the approaches Trisha and I had is that a lot of diets and exercise regimes are based on people of a Caucasian background. So this time we had people on from a black [or] South Asian background".

== Transmissions ==
Series	Start date	End date	Host(s)
1	29 June 2004	November 2004	Gillian McKeith
2	2005	2005	Gillian McKeith
3	10 January 2006	28 March 2006	Gillian McKeith
4	6 September 2006	18 October 2006	Gillian McKeith
5	5 January 2022	9 February 2022	Trisha Goddard & Amir Khan

== International versions ==
Localized versions of You Are What You Eat were produced by Viasat and aired in Sweden, Norway, Denmark, Hungary and the Czech Republic. Viasat was the first company in the world to adapt the format locally. MTV3 also produced a local version of the show in Finland. The show was a success and it was the frequently most viewed show in Finland. A local version as well as the original one was also aired in Belgium.

== Spin-offs ==
In 2004 Celador International (now CPL) arranged a deal with the publisher of the A Place In the Sun magazine, Brooklands Group, to publish a spin-off magazine for You Are What You Eat with the publication featuring advice from Dr Gillian McKeith, tips on healthy eating, recipes and exercise. The cover price was £2.60, with the first issue being published in January 2005 to accompany the new series of the show, then broadcast by Channel 4.

McKeith also contributed a number of recipes to You Are What You Eat Cookbook published by Penguin, the follow-up to the original You Are What You Eat book which was at number one in the UK bestselling books chart for 10 weeks. On 27 December 2004, a spin-off video of You Are What You Eat was issued on DVD and VHS by Lace International.

== Bibliography ==
- You Are What You Eat – 80 Simple, Healthy Recipes (2022)
