= AANC =

AANC may refer to:

- Affaires autochtones et du Nord Canada (Indigenous and Northern Affairs Canada)
- American Association of Nutritional Consultants, a professional organization
