= Scarsdale diet =

Fad diet for weight loss

Cover of The Complete Scarsdale Medical Diet

The Scarsdale diet, a high-protein low-carbohydrate fad diet designed for weight loss, was created in the 1970s by Herman Tarnower and named for the town of Scarsdale in Westchester County, New York where he practiced cardiology. The diet was first described in Tarnower's 1978 book The Complete Scarsdale Medical Diet. Tarnower wrote the book with self-help author Samm Sinclair Baker.

== Overview ==
The diet is similar to the Atkins diet and Stillman diet in calling for a high-protein, low-carbohydrate diet, but also emphasizes the importance of fruits and vegetables. The diet restricts certain foods but allows an unrestricted amount of animal protein, especially eggs, fish, lean meats and poultry. The Scarsdale diet is low-calorie, restricted to 1,000 calories per day, and should be followed for seven to fourteen days.

The Complete Scarsdale Medical Diet was originally published in 1978, and received an unexpected boost in sales after Tarnower was murdered in 1980 by his jilted lover Jean Harris. During her trial, Harris' lawyer argued that she had been the book's "primary author".

== Health risks ==
Medical experts have listed the Scarsdale diet as an example of a fad diet, as it may carry potential health risks and might not instill the kind of healthy eating habits required for sustainable weight loss. Critics claim that it is unbalanced because of the high amount of meat consumed and that the high fat ratio may increase the risk of heart disease. Many who follow the diet can lose much weight at first, but this loss is generally not sustained any better than with normal calorie restriction.

Nutritionist Elaine B. Feldman has commented that high-protein, low-carbohydrate diets such as the Atkins and Scarsdale diets are nutritionally deficient, produce diuresis and are "clearly unphysiologic and may be hazardous". The Scarsdale diet was criticized by Henry Buchwald and colleagues for "serious nutritional deficiencies". Negative effects of the diet include constipation, nausea, weakness and bad breath cause by ketosis. The diet has also been criticized for being deficient in vitamin A and riboflavin.

== See also ==
- List of fad diets
