= Protein-sparing modified fast (diet) =

Type of diet

A protein-sparing modified fast (PSMF) diet is a type of a very-low-calorie diet (<800 kcal per day) with a high proportion of protein calories and simultaneous restriction of carbohydrate and fat. It includes a protein component, fluids, and vitamin and mineral supplementation.

PSMF diets can last for up to 6 months, followed by a gradual increase in calories over 6–8 weeks.

== Description ==
A PSMF attempts to spare the dieter the health risks of a complete fast by introducing the minimum amount of protein necessary to prevent muscle-wasting effects, while still eliminating fats and carbohydrates. Typically, depending on activity level, 0.8–1.2 g of protein per pound of lean body mass (not total body weight) is consumed. Protein beyond this minimum amount is also eliminated, as the body would use it for additional energy by increasing gluconeogenesis. Further lean body mass (muscle, organs, etc.) can be spared through resistance training.

== History ==
=== The Last Chance Diet ===
The concept of "protein-sparing modified fast" (PSMF) was described by George Blackburn in the early 1970s as an intensive weight-loss diet designed to mitigate the harms associated with protein-calorie malnutrition and nitrogen losses induced by either acute illness or hypocaloric diets in patients with obesity, in order to adapt the patient's metabolism sufficiently to use endogenous fat stores as well as to preserve the protein contained in the body cell mass.

The "liquid protein" PSMF diet described in the book The Last Chance Diet in 1976, motivates that the liquid protein diets of varying composition became widely popular. Three years later, in 1979, Isner published a report of 17 deaths associated with liquid protein VLCD, due to heart-related causes. These serious effects caused a substantial concern about the safety of clinical use of PSMF and VLCD. As a result, a review was published that highlighted the differences between these liquid protein diets, arguing that the fatal diets typically used hydrolyzed collagen (gelatin) supplemented with the amino acid tryptophan for protein but that this omitted the other 8 essential amino acids; it further emphasized the importance of close medical monitoring during the fast and refeeding periods.

=== Modern PSMF diets ===
Instead of hydrolyzed collagen, modern medically supervised PSMF diets use more complete liquid protein sources and/or include foods of higher biological value, such as meat, fish, eggs, cheese, and/or tofu. PSMF is used as a treatment for highly motivated patients to achieve rapid weight loss and usually is administered for 6 – 16 weeks.

Before an individual starts a PSMF diet, the individual should also consume specific vitamins minerals and electrolytes daily as long as the diet persists to prevent deficits in other nutrients. It can also be prudent to consult a doctor about getting an electrocardiogram, to check for signs of heart disease.

== See also ==
- Atkins diet: a low-carbohydrate diet
- Dukan Diet: a high-protein, low-carbohydrate, low-fat diet
- Fasting
- Intermittent fasting
- Low-carbohydrate diet
- Stillman diet: a high-protein, low-carbohydrate, low-fat diet
