= Specific dynamic action =

Energy expenditure for processing food

Specific dynamic action (SDA), also known as thermic effect of food (TEF) or dietary induced thermogenesis (DIT), is the amount of energy expenditure above the basal metabolic rate due to the cost of processing food for use and storage. Heat production by brown adipose tissue which is activated after consumption of a meal is an additional component of dietary induced thermogenesis. The thermic effect of food is one of the components of metabolism along with resting metabolic rate and the exercise component. A commonly used estimate of the thermic effect of food is about 10% of one's caloric intake, though the effect varies substantially for different food components. For example, dietary fat is very easy to process, induces very little sympathetic arousal, and has very little thermic effect, while protein is hard to process and produces a much larger thermic effect.

== Factors that affect the specific dynamic action ==
The specific dynamic action is increased by both aerobic training of sufficient duration and intensity or by anaerobic weight training. Caffeine intake at meals also has been shown to increase TEF by enhancing sympathetic arousal. However, these effects are marginal, amounting to 7-8 calories per hour. The primary determinants of daily TEF are the total caloric content of the meals and the macronutrient composition of the meals ingested. Meal frequency has little to no effect on TEF, assuming total calorie intake for the days are equivalent.

Some studies suggest that SDA may be reduced in patients with obesity, especially those with insulin resistance, although research findings are mixed. A low TEF could potentially predispose to obesity by reducing energy expenditure and promoting a positive energy balance. Alternatively, the presence of a low TEF in many patients with obesity may be explained by insulin resistance, which can be related to excess dietary energy and vary in severity with the degree of obesity. Over time, chronic hyperinsulinemia could diminish the ability of cells to respond to insulin, promote adiposity and peripheral insulin resistance, and worsen the risk for type 2 diabetes. Some research shows that TEF may be more severely impaired in patients depending on the grade of insulin resistance, although some other studies have not reproduced that finding.

The mechanism of SDA is unknown, but in the case of dietary carbohydrates, it has been shown to be strongly related to increases in sympathetic activity. TEF has been described as the energy used in the distribution of nutrients and metabolic processes in the liver. For example, dietary protein produces a high TEF because of the high energy costs associated with processing it, and it has been shown that hepatectomized animal exhibits no signs of TEF. By contrast, the energy costs of the digestion and absorption of food play a much less significant role; indeed, research shows that intravenous injections of nutrients such as glucose or amino acids results in an effect equal to that of oral ingestion of the same nutrients.

== Types of foods ==
The specific dynamic action is the energy required for digestion, absorption, and disposal of ingested nutrients. Its magnitude depends on the composition of the food consumed:

- Carbohydrates: 5 to 15% of the energy consumed
- Protein: 20 to 30%
- Fats: 0 to 3%

Raw celery and grapefruit are often claimed to have negative caloric balance (requiring more energy to digest than recovered from the food), with the assumption being that the thermic effect exceeds the low caloric content due to the high fibre matrix that must be unraveled to access their carbohydrates. However, there has been no research carried out to test this hypothesis and a significant amount of the thermic effect depends on the insulin sensitivity of the individual, with more insulin-sensitive individuals showing a significant TEF while individuals with increasing resistance have negligible to zero effects.

The Functional Food Centre at Oxford Brookes University conducted a study into the effects of chilli peppers and medium-chain triglycerides (MCT) on Diet Induced Thermogenesis (DIT). They concluded that "adding chilli and MCT to meals increases DIT by over 50% which over time may accumulate to help induce weight loss and prevent weight gain or regain".

Australia's Human Nutrition conducted a study on the effect of meal content in lean women's diets on the thermic effect of food and found that the inclusion of an ingredient containing increased soluble fibre and amylose did not reduce spontaneous food intake but rather was associated with higher subsequent energy intakes despite its reduced glycaemic and insulinemic effects.

== Measuring SDA ==
The specific dynamic action should be measured for a period of time greater than or equal to five hours.

The American Journal of Clinical Nutrition published that SDA lasts beyond six hours for the majority of people.
