= Jean Harris =

Headmistress; convicted celebrity murderer (1923–2012)

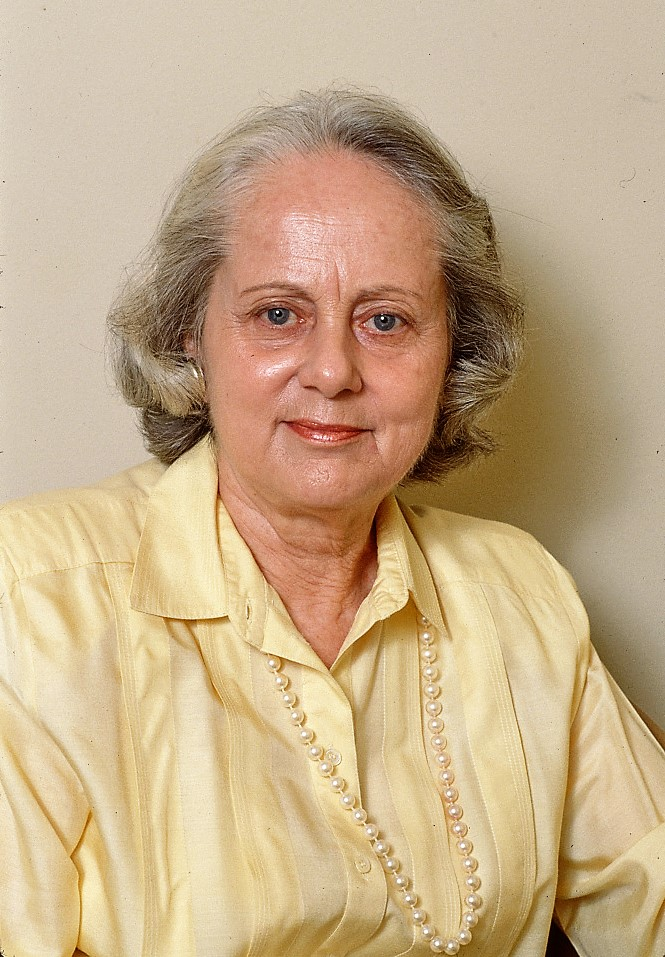
- Harris in 1988
- Born: Jean Struven; April 27, 1923; Chicago, Illinois, U.S.
- Died: December 23, 2012 (aged 89); New Haven, Connecticut, U.S.
- Occupation: Educator
- Spouse: Jim Harris (m. 1945; div. 1965)
- Partner: Herman Tarnower (1966-1980)
- Children: 2

Jean Struven Harris (April 27, 1923 – December 23, 2012) was the headmistress of The Madeira School for girls in McLean, Virginia, who made US news in the early 1980s when she was tried and convicted of the murder of her ex-lover, Herman Tarnower, a well-known cardiologist and author of the best-selling book The Complete Scarsdale Medical Diet.

== Biography ==
Born Jean Struven on April 27, 1923, in Chicago, Illinois, to Albert and Mildred Struven, Harris was the second of four children. She went to Laurel School in Shaker Heights, Ohio, before attending Smith College in Northampton, Massachusetts. In 1945, she graduated magna cum laude from Smith with a degree in economics. After college, she married Jim Harris and they had two sons by 1952. In 1965, Harris divorced her husband, who died in 1977.

Harris met Tarnower, a cardiologist (later known as the "Scarsdale Diet Doctor" following the publication of his popular diet book), in December 1966, the year after her divorce. They then began a 14-year relationship. Though Tarnower showered Harris with gifts and exotic vacations, he had relationships with multiple other women during these years.

Harris worked as the headmistress of the Madeira School for girls in McLean, Virginia, while continuing her long-distance relationship with Tarnower. Harris was aware of Tarnower's other relationships; he did not hide them from her. Tarnower prescribed Harris multiple medications over the course of several years, including methamphetamine. In the 1970s, Tarnower hired Lynne Tryforos, a divorcée more than thirty years his junior, to work as a secretary-receptionist at the Scarsdale Medical Center. Tarnower then began an affair with Tryforos.

== Killing ==
In late winter 1980, Madeira students were preparing to leave for their break when some staged a "sit-in" protest that denounced the educators and headmistress of Madeira. Harris was troubled by the actions of the students. On the evening of March 9, Madeira faculty members noted she seemed despondent and distant. It was later learned that she was addicted to one of her prescription medications.

On March 10, 1980, Harris made a five-hour, 264-mile drive from the Madeira School in Virginia to Herman Tarnower's home in Purchase, New York, with a .32 caliber revolver in her possession. She later stated that she had planned to commit suicide after talking in person with Tarnower one last time. When she arrived at the house, she noticed Tryforos' lingerie in the bedroom. An argument ensued, and Tarnower allegedly said to her, "Jesus, Jean, you're crazy! Get out of here!" According to Harris a struggle over the gun ensued when Harris told Tarnower she was going to kill herself. Prosecutors disputed her claim, noting that she had placed extra ammunition in her pocket before confronting Tarnower. Harris shot Tarnower four times at close range. She later reported that she tried phoning for help from the upstairs bedroom, but that phone was not working. She left in her car to get help not knowing Tarnower's housekeeper had already phoned the police after hearing the gunshots. Harris saw police cars driving past her, headed in the direction of Tarnower's home. She turned her car around and followed the police cars back to his home. She was ultimately arrested and booked for second-degree murder. She pled not guilty, insisting that the shooting was an accident in that the gun had gone off accidentally and repeatedly while Tarnower tried to wrestle it away from her.

== Legal defense and trial ==
Harris was released on $80,000 bail raised by her brother and sisters and signed into the United Hospital of Port Chester for psychiatric evaluation and therapy. She then contracted the services of attorneys Joel Aurnou and Bonnie Steingart to plan her defense.

The case went to trial at the Westchester County Courthouse in White Plains, New York, on November 21, 1980, and was prosecuted by Assistant District Attorney George Bolen. The trial lasted 14 weeks, becoming one of the longest in state history. The New York press sensationalized the trial and made Harris a household name from coast-to-coast. Harris took the stand and testified at length in her own defense, but the jury rejected her story that the shooting had been accidental and convicted her of second-degree murder after eight days of deliberations. Consequently, Harris was not legally eligible to inherit $220,000 Tarnower had bequeathed to her in his will.

Harris consistently maintained that she did not intentionally kill Tarnower. Joel Aurnou later stated that he encouraged his client to plead guilty to a lesser charge, but she refused. Because the defense had refused to admit any possibility of Harris acting intentionally in the death, the jury was not offered the option of finding Harris guilty of manslaughter, and the mental health professionals who tested and treated Harris were not called to testify. Judge Russell R. Leggett ordered her confined to the Bedford Hills Correctional Facility for Women in Westchester County, New York, for the minimum of 15 years to life. Numerous appeals followed the conviction, but the higher courts determined that she had received a fair trial. While serving her sentence, Harris made it her mission to improve the education of fellow inmates in her facility. She began programs in which women could work toward obtaining their GEDs or college degrees while imprisoned. She also taught a parenting class to inmates and developed the in-prison nursery for babies born to inmates.

Eleven years after Harris's conviction, Governor Mario Cuomo commuted the remainder of her sentence on December 29, 1992, as she was being prepped for quadruple bypass heart surgery. She was released from prison by the parole board and initially planned to live in a cabin in New Hampshire, but later moved to the Whitney Center, a retirement home in Hamden, Connecticut.

== Death ==
Harris died of natural causes on December 23, 2012, at an assisted-living center in New Haven, Connecticut at age 89. She was survived by her sons, David and Jimmie.

== In media ==
Harris' story was told by Diana Trilling in the 1982 book Mrs. Harris, and by the journalist Shana Alexander in the 1983 book Very Much a Lady: The Untold Story of Jean Harris and Dr. Herman Tarnower.

Harris' murder trial was depicted in the 1981 made-for-television movie The People vs. Jean Harris. She was portrayed by Ellen Burstyn, who was nominated for an Emmy Award and a Golden Globe Award for the performance. Burstyn was later nominated for another Emmy for a cameo role as one of Tarnower's former lovers in Mrs. Harris, an HBO film in which Annette Bening and Ben Kingsley played Harris and Tarnower. The 2005 film shows Harris' relationship with Tarnower from beginning to end, including the trial. Bening and Kingsley both received Emmy and Golden Globe nominations.

In the 1995 film Dolores Claiborne, the journalist daughter Jennifer Jason Leigh asks her mother, Kathy Bates, why she killed her husband. The daughter then excuses herself by saying, "Don't feel too bad, Ma. I asked Jean Harris the same thing once."

In the 1997 Seinfeld episode "The Summer of George", Raquel Welch plays herself portraying Harris in a fictional Tony Award-winning musical about the murders called Scarsdale Surprise.

Thomas Noguchi analyzed the case in Noguchi's 1985 book Coroner at Large.

Harris and Tarnower are referenced in Christine Lavin's song "Cold Pizza for Breakfast".

In Nora Ephron’s 2006 essay collection I Feel Bad About My Neck, Ephron mentions attending a lunch at Le Cirque in honor of Harris the week of her release from prison.

The October 4, 2013, episode of the show Deadly Women tells Harris' story from when she met Tarnower to when she killed him. The episode is called "Vengeance". A 2016 episode of Murder Made Me Famous tells the same story. That episode is called "Jean Harris".

The Sophia Smith Collection at Smith College in Northampton, Massachusetts, has a collection of Harris' records.

Barbara Walters conducted several interviews with Harris. On November 16, 2015, Walters aired an episode on American Scandals called "Jean Harris: The Headmistress Murderer".
