= Very-low-calorie diet =

Diet with very or extremely low daily food energy consumption

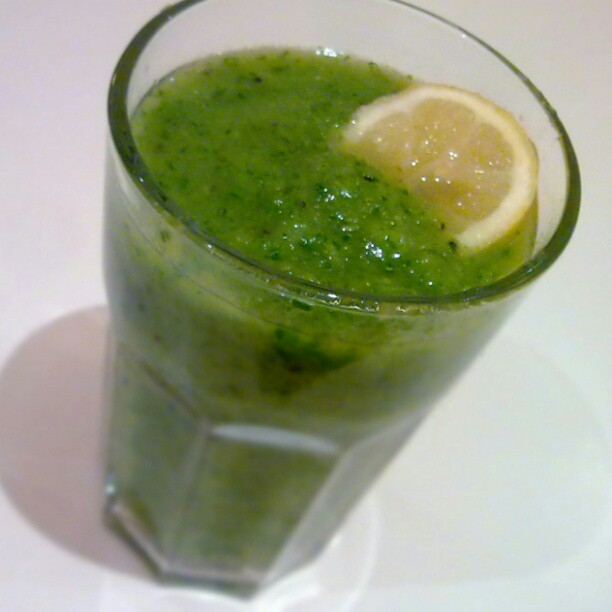
Very-low-calorie diets often consist of liquid drinks made from fresh fruits and vegetables, although very-low-calorie meals also exist.

A very-low-calorie diet (VLCD), also known as semistarvation diet and crash diet, is a type of diet with very or extremely low daily food energy consumption. VLCDs are defined as a diet of 800 kilocalories (3,300 kJ) per day or less. Modern medically supervised VLCDs use total meal replacements, with regulated formulations in Europe and Canada which contain the recommended daily requirements for vitamins, minerals, trace elements, fatty acids, protein and electrolyte balance. Carbohydrates may be entirely absent, or substituted for a portion of the protein; this choice has important metabolic effects. Medically supervised VLCDs have specific therapeutic applications for rapid weight loss, such as in morbid obesity or before a bariatric surgery, using formulated, nutritionally complete liquid meals containing 800 kilocalories or less per day for a maximum of 12 weeks.

Unmonitored VLCDs with insufficient or unbalanced nutrients can cause sudden death by cardiac arrest either by starvation or during refeeding.

== Definition ==
Very-low-calorie diets (VLCDs) are diets of 800 kilocalories (3,300 kJ) or less energy intake per day, whereas low-calorie diets are between 1000 and 1200 kcal per day.

== Health effects ==
The routine use of VLCDs is not recommended due to safety concerns, but this approach can be used under medical supervision if there is a clinical rationale for rapid weight loss in obese individuals, as part of a "multi-component weight management strategy" with continuous support and for a maximum of 12 weeks, according to the NICE 2014 guidelines. The US dietary guidelines recommend that VLCDs can be used for weight loss in obese individuals only in limited circumstances and only under supervision by experienced personnel in a medical care setting where the individual can be medically monitored and high-intensity lifestyle intervention can be provided. For the general public, VLCDs are not recommended due to low evidence. As there are considerable risks of starvation with an inadequately composed or supervised VLCD, people attempting these diets must be monitored closely by a physician to prevent complications.

VLCDs appear to be more effective than behavioral weight loss programs or other diets, achieving approximately 4 kilograms (8.8 lb) more weight loss at 1 year and greater sustained weight loss after several years. When used in routine care, there is evidence that VLCDs achieve average weight loss at 1 year around 10 kilograms (22 lb) or about 4% more weight loss over the short term. VLCDs can achieve higher short-term weight loss compared to other more modest or gradual calorie restricted diets, and the maintained long-term weight loss is similar or greater. VLCDs were shown to reduce lean body mass. Combining VLCD with other obesity therapies yield more effective results in weight loss. Low-calorie and very-low-calorie diets may produce faster weight loss within the first 1–2 weeks of starting compared to other diets, but this superficially faster loss is due to glycogen depletion and water loss in the lean body mass and is regained quickly afterward.

VLCDs are efficient and recommended for liver fat reduction and weight loss before bariatric surgery.

A 2001 review found that VLCD has no serious harmful effect when done under medical supervision, for periods of 8–16 weeks with an average weight loss of 1.5-2.5 kg/week. However, VLCD may increase the risk of developing gallstones if the fat content of VLCD is not sufficient, but data is lacking to know the precise amount of fat that is necessary to avoid gallstones formation. Indeed, dietary fat stimulates gall bladder contraction, thus, if following a fat-free VLCD, the bladder does not empty. Another potential side effect is constipation (depending on the fiber content of the diet).

VLCD were not found to increase food cravings, and on the contrary, appear to reduce food cravings more than low-calorie diets.

Previous formulations (medical or commercial) of carbohydrate-free very low calorie diets provided 200–800 kcal/day and maintained protein intake, but eliminated any carbohydrate intake and sometimes fat intake as well. These diets subject the body to starvation and produce an average weekly weight loss of 1.5–2.5 kilograms (3.3–5.5 lb). However, the total lack of carbohydrates avoids protein sparing and thus produce a loss of lean muscle mass, as well as other adverse side effects such as increased risks of gout, and electrolyte imbalances, and are thus disadvised. Total diet replacement programs are the modern formulations regulated in Europe and Canada to ensure the recommended daily intake of necessary nutrients, vitamins and electrolyte balance. Compared to older VLCD formulas, the total diet replacements better preserve lean body mass, reduce known side effects and improve nutritional status.

Unmonitored VLCDs with insufficient macronutrient and mineral intake have the potential to cause an electrolyte imbalance and sudden death via ventricular tachycardia either by starvation or upon refeeding.

== History and society ==
The earliest data on VLCDs come from the aftermath of World War II, when several scientific experiments were undertaken to examine what conditions could lead to starvation and how to rehabilitate safely to eating, such as the Minnesota Starvation Experiment, in an effort to reduce the casualties caused by famine following the war.

VLCD is used for clinical purposes since at least the 1980s.

In 1978, 58 people died in the United States after following very-low-calorie liquid protein diets. Following this event, the FDA requires since 1984 that protein VLCDs providing fewer than 400 calories a day carry a warning that they can cause serious illness and need to be followed under medical supervision. However, newer regulations require this warning only on protein products that aim to provide more than half of a person's calories and are promoted for weight loss or as a food supplement. This enabled protein VLCD drinks such as Slim-Fast that provide fewer than 400 calories to avoid warnings by recommending that users "also eat one sensible meal each day".

In 1991, the Federal Trade Commission charged three liquid VLCD companies, Optifast, Medifast and Ultrafast, with deceptive advertising. The case was settled after the companies agreed to stop using what the FTC alleged to be deceptive claims about the long-term results and the safety of these diets.

== See also ==
- Dieting
- Fasting and longevity
- Ketogenic diet
- Ketosis
- List of diets
- Management of obesity
- Negative-calorie food
- Protein-sparing modified fast, a type of very-low-calorie diet, aiming to spare proteins and thus preserve muscle tissues
