= Gillian McKeith =

Scottish television presenter and writer (born 1959)

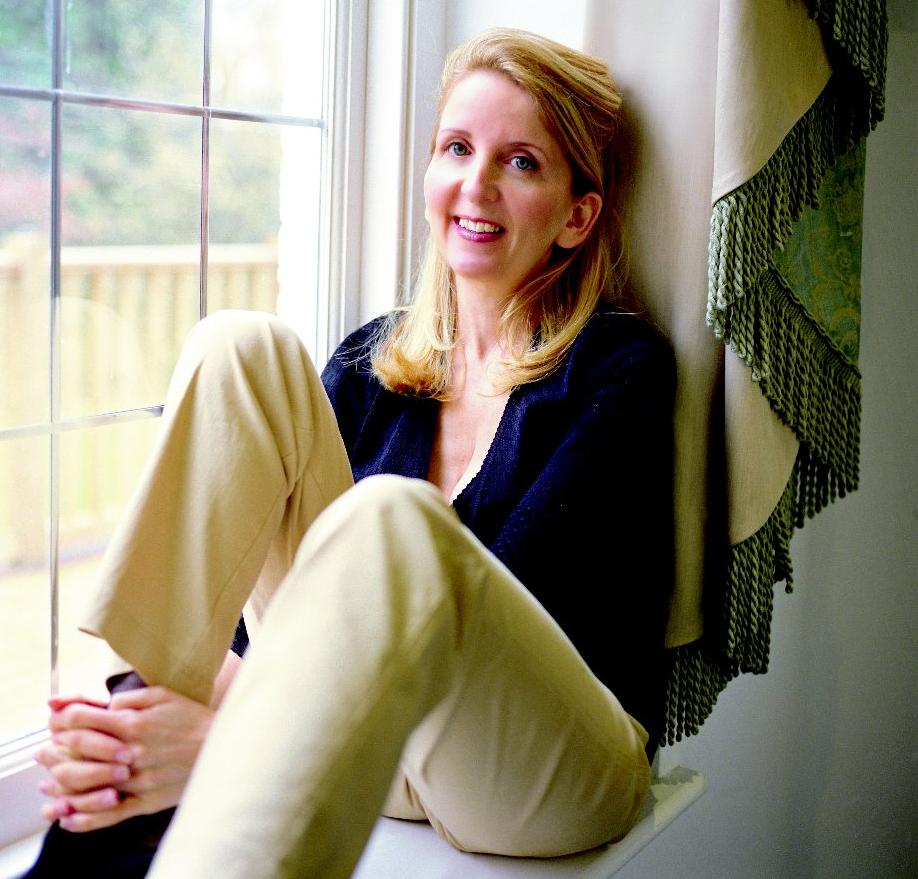
- McKeith c. mid-'00s
- Born: 28 September 1959 (age 67); Perth, Scotland
- Education: University of Edinburgh (BA) University of Pennsylvania (MA)
- Occupations: Television personality; writer
- Television: You Are What You Eat; I'm a Celebrity...Get Me Out of Here!; Dr Gillian McKeith's Feel Fab Forever; Eat Yourself Sexy
- Children: 2
- Website: gillianmckeith.com

Gillian McKeith (born 28 September 1959) is a Scottish television personality and writer. She is known for her promotion of various pseudoscientific ideas about health and nutrition. She is the former host of Channel 4's You Are What You Eat (2004–2006), Granada Television's Dr Gillian McKeith's Feel Fab Forever (2009–2010), and W Network's Eat Yourself Sexy (2010). In 2008, McKeith regularly appeared on the E4 health show Supersize vs Superskinny, and in 2010, she was a contestant on the tenth series of the ITV show I'm a Celebrity...Get Me Out of Here!.

Numerous practices supported by McKeith are pseudoscience not supported by scientific research, such as the detox diet, colonic irrigation, and her claims that examining the tongue and stool samples can be used to identify ailments and dietary needs. McKeith has no qualifications in nutrition or medicine from accredited institutions, and in 2007 agreed with the Advertising Standards Authority to stop using the title "Doctor".

McKeith has written several books about nutrition, including You Are What You Eat (2004), which sold more than two million copies, and Dr Gillian McKeith's Ultimate Health Plan (2006). The validity of her approach and the safety of her recommendations have been strongly criticised by health professionals. She faced criticism during the COVID-19 pandemic for promoting COVID-19 misinformation and anti-vaccine views, and was described as a conspiracy theorist.

== Early life and education ==
McKeith was born in Perth, Scotland, and grew up on a council estate. Her father, Robert, was a shipyard worker and her mother an office worker. She has said that she was raised eating the junk food she now advises against: "We all know the kind of food I grew up with—a typical Scottish diet. We'd have meat three times a day. I certainly never ate a mango, and had no idea what macrobiotic meant." Her father was a long-term smoker and died of cancer of the oesophagus in 2005.

She obtained a degree in linguistics from the University of Edinburgh in 1981, before moving to the United States, where she worked in marketing and international business. In 1984, she received an MA in international relations from the University of Pennsylvania. She claims to have received an MA in holistic nutrition in 1994 and a PhD in that same field in 1997, both via distance-learning programmes from the non-accredited American Holistic College of Nutrition, later the Clayton College of Natural Health in Birmingham, Alabama, since closed. She is a member of the American Association of Nutritional Consultants, but this association runs no checks on the qualifications of its members; this allowed British physician Ben Goldacre to register his dead cat for the same membership held by McKeith.

In February 2007, she agreed to stop using the academic title "Doctor" in advertisements, after a complaint to the UK's Advertising Standards Authority. Responding to criticism that her use of her qualifications in linguistics and language and international relations, subjects entirely unrelated to diet and nutrition, are misleading to the public, McKeith said she was challenging orthodox medical opinions. She rejected the claim that using the title to promote her theories on nutrition was unethical.

McKeith and her husband have alleged defamation but failed to initiate threatened legal action against critics. Ben Goldacre speculated that parts of her PhD thesis may have been published as a 48-page pamphlet entitled "Miracle Superfood: Wild Blue-Green Algae"; he called the pamphlet cargo cult science, describing it as full of "anecdote, but no data." In his book Bad Science (2008) Goldacre dedicates a chapter to an analysis of her scientific credibility. In July 2010, on Twitter, McKeith described Goldacre's book as "lies"; Goldacre requested a correction.

== Career ==
According to her Channel 4 biography, McKeith was celebrity health reporter for the Joan Rivers show, and when McKeith first moved to the United States she co-presented a syndicated radio show called Healthline Across America.

Prior to the 2002 United Kingdom local elections, McKeith applied to become a Conservative Party candidate in the London Borough of Camden. It was said that McKeith wished to become a councillor so that she could be the MP for Hampstead (then part of the Hampstead and Highgate constituency). However, McKeith withdrew her application a few weeks later, and did not stand at the 2002 Camden elections.

=== You Are What You Eat ===
Her book You Are What You Eat had sold over two million copies by 2006, and was the most borrowed non-fiction library book in the UK between July 2005 and June 2006. The book derived from the Channel 4 show she presented, You Are What You Eat, broadcast until 2007, in which she attempted to motivate people to lose weight and change their lifestyle. Ian Marber, a nutritionist, described her in 2006 as fervent in her beliefs and considers herself a sort of health televangelist. In each episode of the fourth series, called Gillian Moves In: You Are What You Eat, two people were chosen to stay with McKeith at a house in London "with no escape". She first showed each of the subjects their typical week's food consumption. The food was laid out on a table in a cold, congealed and unpleasant state. The subjects were often shown emptying the display into refuse sacks. According to Jan Moir in The Daily Telegraph, she was seen "shouting at sobbing, fat women while forcing them to eat quinoa and undergo frequent sessions of colonic irrigation enthusiastically administered by her good self." She then offered advice on diet and exercise, and forbade alcohol. Once trained, the participants were able to return home, and were expected to stick to their new regime for eight weeks. If they failed to stick to it, McKeith moved in with them to make sure they followed her advice. The participants were shown at the end of the eight weeks to have lost body mass, and said they felt healthier.

She often attributed some of the featured clients' health problems to a vitamin or mineral deficiency. There are certain foods she considered to be particularly nutritious, and these were often mentioned in her programmes. These can be unusual foods, some of which are available only from health food shops or from McKeith's own range of products. A spokesperson for Celador, the television production company responsible for McKeith's series, said that the criticism of her is reflective of her rejection of traditionalist approaches to nutrition: "You have to realise that when someone takes a holistic approach, there is always going to be an old school of traditionalists who are going to be sceptical and besmirch that. That's what's going on."

=== Diagnostic techniques ===
In her book You Are What You Eat, McKeith advocates examination of the tongue, the mapping of pimples, and detailed scrutiny of faecal matter and urine as indicators of health. She asserts that many exterior parts of the body provide insight into illness: "I always think of the tongue as being like a window to the organs. The extreme tip correlates to the heart, the bit slightly behind is the lungs. The right side shows what the gallbladder is up to and the left side the liver. The middle indicates the condition of your stomach and spleen, the back the kidneys, intestines and womb." These claims have no scientific basis.

She assesses people's nutritional needs based on the appearance of their nails, hair, lips, and skin. She also attributes the presence of depression or PMS to mineral deficiencies, and maintains that the location of pimples can suggest the source of health problems. McKeith also argues that the appearance, smell and consistency of faeces can give clues to bodily malfunction. She frequently took up this practice during her television shows, a technique that led Ben Goldacre, a physician who wrote for The Guardian at the time, to dub her "the awful poo lady".

=== Nutritional advice ===
McKeith's advice is primarily alternative medicine without any scientific basis. She recommends a detox diet in which the "top 12 toxic terrors to avoid" are: smoking; caffeine; alcohol; chocolate and sweet snacks; pub snacks such as crisps, nuts, and pork scratchings; processed meat; white bread, white pasta, white rice; products containing added sugar; takeaways and ready meals; table salt; saturated fats; and fizzy drinks. McKeith advocates a pescetarian—sea foods—diet high in fruits and vegetables, grains, beans, nuts, and tofu, and the avoidance of processed and high-calorie foods, sugar and fat, red meat, alcohol, caffeine, white flour, and additives.

Goldacre writes that he finds it offensive that the British media is "filled with people who adopt a cloak of scientific authority while apparently misunderstanding the most basic aspects of biology." He offers as an example McKeith's recommendation to eat darker leaves because they are rich in chlorophyll, writing that her claim that it will "really oxygenate your blood" is erroneous as sunlight usually is absent inside the human bowel. McKeith's advice in her book Miracle Superfood: Wild Blue-Green Algae is also disputed. Jan Krokowski of the Scottish Environment Protection Agency wrote a letter to New Scientist, as a private individual, saying "blue-green algae—properly called cyanobacteria—are able to produce a range of very powerful toxins, which pose health hazards to humans and animals and can result in illness and death." In response to the criticism, McKeith argues: "I am on a crusade to change the nation and fortunately, or unfortunately, that is going to put me in the limelight. But you cannot have change without a bit of resistance."

=== Products ===
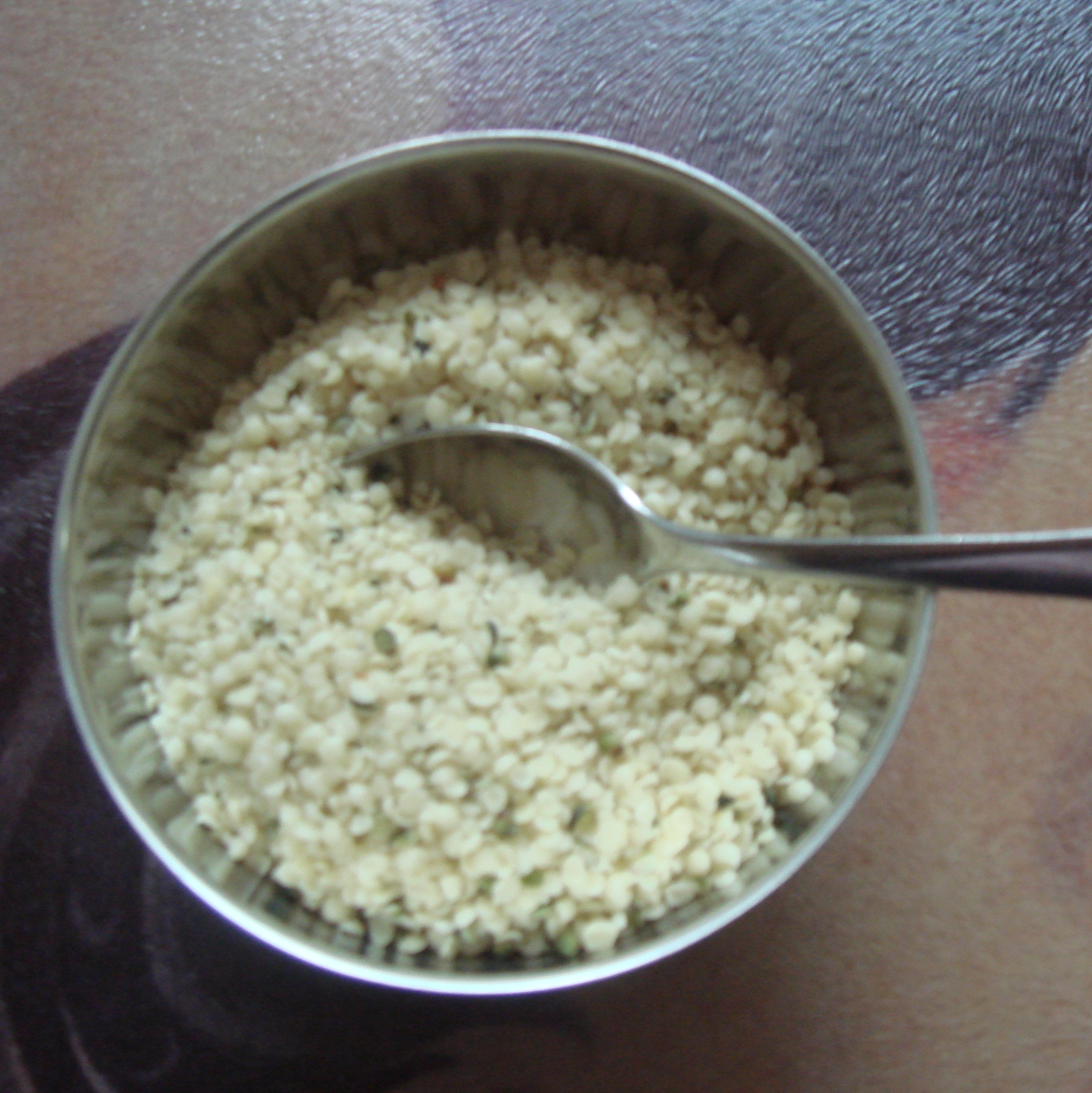
McKeith's organic shelled hemp seeds

McKeith's website sells books, advice, club membership, food (e.g. goji berries, hemp seeds, "Living Food Energy Powder", "Immune Defence" pills, weight loss pills, "Raw and unprocessed wild blue green algae", etc.), and accessory equipment (blender, juicers, sprouters, and a mini-trampoline). She was censured in November 2006 by the Medicines and Healthcare products Regulatory Agency (MHRA) for selling unproven herbal sex aids. The products, "Fast Formula Wild Pink Yam Complex" and "Fast Formula Horny Goat Weed Complex" were both advertised as having been shown, in a controlled study, to promote sexual satisfaction. The MHRA found McKeith had been "selling goods without legal authorisation whilst making medicinal claims about their efficacy." The products have since been withdrawn. McKeith's website suggested the sex aids had been withdrawn because of European Union regulations. Goldacre contacted the MHRA, who said the removal had nothing to do with any EU regulations.

=== Other television ===
In 2007, McKeith presented Three Fat Brides, One Thin Dress for Channel 4, a competitive version of the You Are What You Eat format in which three women compete for a designer wedding dress. In addition to presenting her own TV shows, she occasionally appears in other programmes. She competed in The X Factor: Battle of the Stars, singing her rendition of "The Shoop Shoop Song". She also appeared in a health show transmitted on E4 called Supersize vs Superskinny. In 2009, she appeared on the W Network in Canada on Eat Yourself Sexy, in which participants claimed to have a diminished sense of sex appeal or sex drive, with McKeith employing the same practices as in You Are What You Eat. In November 2010, she became a contestant on the UK version of I'm a Celebrity... Get Me Out of Here!. In January 2016, McKeith appeared on Celebrity Big Brother as a short-term housemate, sent in to 'detox' the contestants. In 2023, she appeared in I'm a Celebrity... South Africa, once again causing controversy with contraband smuggled into camp in her spicy knickers.

=== COVID-19 misinformation and conspiracy theories ===
During the COVID-19 pandemic, McKeith opposed lockdowns and promoted anti-vaccination and COVID-19 conspiracy theories. She expressed her belief in a conspiracy of impending "martial law" and "fascist tyranny". She urged followers to refuse vaccines, referring to them as "clotshots", and instead suggested without evidence that nutrition could provide immunity against infection, prompting criticism from the British Nutrition Foundation and British Dietetic Association. In May 2021 she took part in an anti-vaccine protest at the Westfield shopping centre in London. She spoke at another protest in July 2021 alongside the conspiracy theorists David Icke and Piers Corbyn and again at a London protest that December. In November 2021 she posted on Twitter implying that the sperm of vaccinated men was inferior, with no medical basis.

== Personal life ==
McKeith met her husband, the American lawyer Howard Magaziner, in Edinburgh, where he was spending a year studying. At the time he ran a chain of health food shops in the United States, with which she became involved. The couple now live in London and have two daughters. McKeith has scoliosis, and has said there is not a moment in her life when she is not in pain because of it.

== Filmography ==
- You Are What You Eat (2004–2006)
- You Are What You Eat – Three Fat Brides, One Thin Dress (2007)
- Supersize vs Superskinny (2008)
- Dr Gillian McKeith's Feel Fab Forever (2009–2010)
- Eat Yourself Sexy (2010)
- I'm a Celebrity...Get Me Out of Here! (2010)
- I'm a Celebrity... South Africa (2023)

== Bibliography ==
- (1996) Miracle Superfood: Wild Blue-Green Algae: the nutrient powerhouse that stimulates the immune system, boosts brain power and guards against disease. ISBN 0-87983-729-2
- (2004) Gillian McKeith's living food for health: 12 natural superfoods to transform your health. ISBN 0-7499-2673-2
- (2004) You Are What You Eat. ISBN 0-452-28717-0
- (2005) You Are What You Eat Cookbook. ISBN 0-7181-4797-9
- (2006) Dr Gillian McKeith's Ultimate Health Plan: The Diet Programme That Will Keep You Slim for Life. Michael Joseph. ISBN 0-7181-4891-6
- (2006) Dr Gillian McKeith’s Shopping Guide. Michael Joseph. ISBN 0-7181-4954-8
- (2007) Slim for Life. Plume. ISBN 0-452-28925-4
- (2009) Gillian McKeith's Food Bible: How to Use Food to Cure What Ails You. Plume. ISBN 0-452-28997-1
- (2009) Gillian McKeith's Boot Camp Diet: Fourteen Days to a New You!. Penguin. ISBN 0-14-103716-4
- (2010) Women's Health: A Practical Guide to All the Stages and Ages of the Female Life Cycle. Michael Joseph. ISBN 0-7181-5435-5
