= Pierre Dukan =

French nutritionist (born 1941)

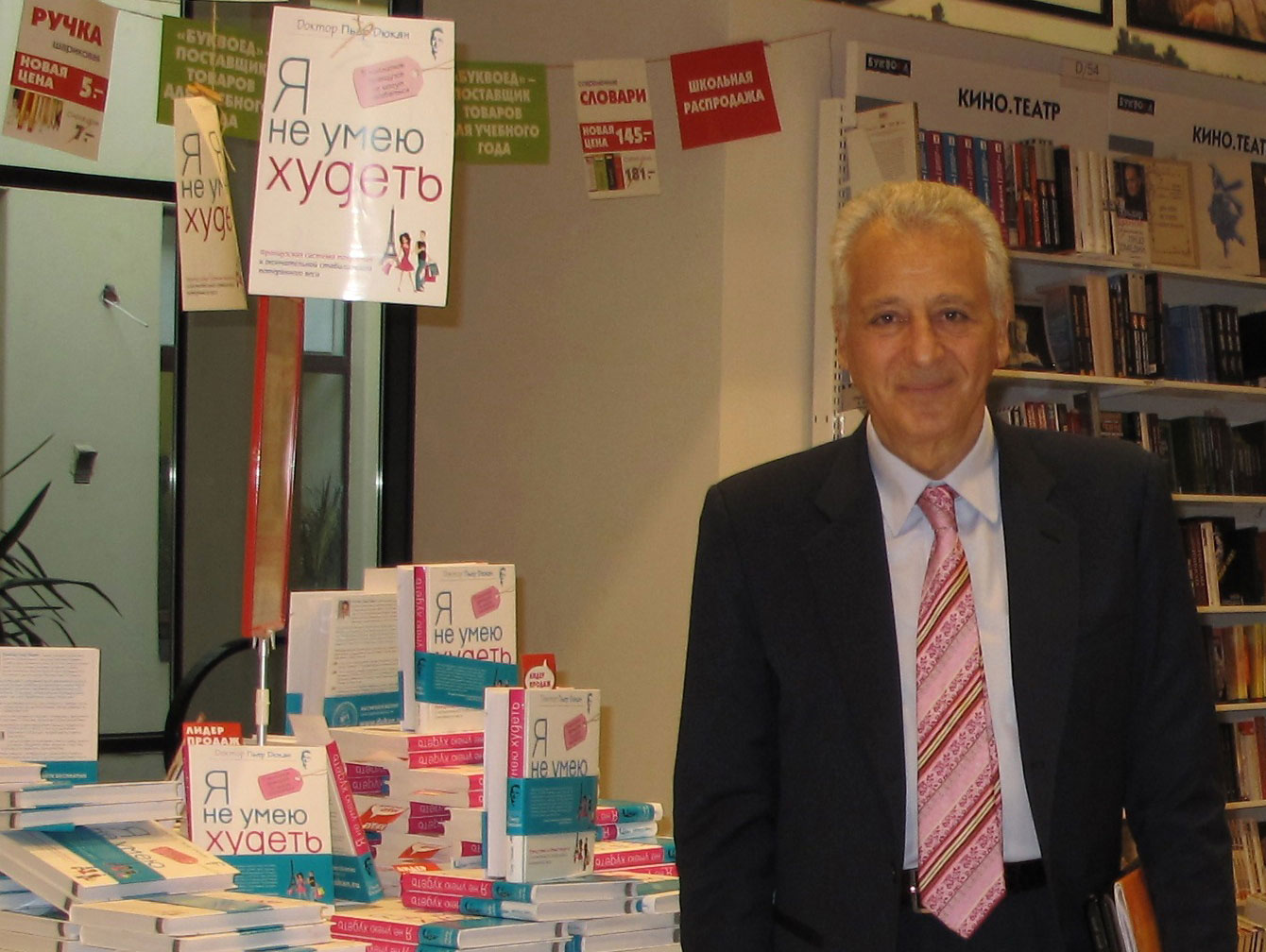
- "I don't know how to get slimmer" in Russia
- Born: July 8, 1941 (age 84); Algiers, French Algeria
- Occupations: dietician, and author

Pierre Dukan (born July 8, 1941), is a French former nutritionist, and the creator of a popular diet named after him, the Dukan Diet.

== Controversies ==
In July 2011 a French court ruled against Dukan in his attempt to sue rival nutritionist Jean-Michel Cohen for libel, after Cohen had criticised Dukan's method in the press.

In January 2012, Dukan suggested that the Baccalaureate exam, taken by 17-year-old children, should include one test which the children could pass simply by staying within appropriate weight limits. He faced a disciplinary hearing in connection with these remarks.

In March 2012 the French Ordre des médecins asserted that Dukan had violated the organization's medical code of practice by practising medicine as a business.

In May 2012, he was removed from the membership of the Ordre des Médecins at his request.

In January 2014, Dukan was struck off the medical register for promoting his diet commercially.
