= Stuart Fischer =

American medical doctor and author

Stuart Fischer (born 23 July, 1950, in Brooklyn, New York) is an American medical doctor, and an author best known for creating The Park Avenue Diet.

== Early life and education ==
Stuart Fischer is a native of Brooklyn, New York. A graduate of Yale University, Fischer completed his residency in internal medicine at Maimonides Medical Center in Brooklyn, New York, and served as an attending physician in the emergency room of Cabrini Medical Center in Manhattan for four years.

== Career ==
Fischer was the associate medical director of The Atkins Center operated by the late Robert Atkins.

Fischer is the author of the Little Book of Big Medical Emergencies which contains information about how to deal with common medical emergencies such as fainting, heart attacks, epileptic seizures, and life-threatening allergic reactions.

=== The Park Avenue Diet ===
The Park Avenue Diet is a six-week weight loss program including meal plans and advice regarding exercise, hair, makeup, and relationships. Seven experts contributed to The Park Avenue Diet, both the book and the medical practice. The experts are socialite Tinsley Mortimer, hairdresser Joel Warren, fitness personality Bernadette Penotti, psychologist Stanley Krippner, makeup artist Laura Geller, business consultant Helene Hellsten, and chef Marie-Annick Courtier.
