= Negative-calorie food =

Type of dieting food

A negative-calorie food is food that supposedly requires more food energy to be digested than the food provides. Its thermic effect or specific dynamic action—the caloric "cost" of digesting the food—would be greater than its food energy content. Despite its recurring popularity in dieting guides, there is no evidence supporting the idea that any food is calorically negative. While some chilled beverages are calorically negative, the effect is minimal and requires drinking very large amounts of water, which can be dangerous, as it can cause water intoxication.

== Controversy ==
There is no evidence to show that any foods have a negative calorific impact. Foods claimed to be negative in calories are mostly low-calorie fruits and vegetables, notably celery, but also grapefruit, orange, lemon, lime, apple, lettuce, broccoli, and cabbage. However, celery has a thermic effect of around 8%, much less than the 100% or more required for a food to have "negative calories", unless the celery is frozen prior to consumption, however that would make it too hard to chew.

Diets based on negative-calorie food do not work as advertised but can lead to weight loss because they satisfy hunger by filling the stomach with food that is not calorically dense. A 2005 study based on a low-fat plant-based diet found that the average participant lost 13 pounds (5.9 kg) over fourteen weeks, and attributed the weight loss to the reduced energy density of the foods resulting from their low fat content and high fiber content, and the increased thermic effect. Nevertheless, these diets are not "negative-calorie" since they bear energy. Another study demonstrated that negative-calorie diets (NCDs) have the same efficacy to low-calorie diets (LCDs) in inducing weight loss when both of these diets are combined with exercise.

Chewing gum has been speculated as a negative-calorie food; a study on chewing gum reported mastication burns roughly 11 kcal (46 kJ) per hour. Therefore, to reach "negative-calorie", one has to chew for almost 6 minutes per kcal (one chewing gum can have a large range of kcal from around 2 to 15 kcal).

== See also ==
- Diet
- Dieting
- Calorie restriction
- List of diets
- Very-low-calorie diet
- Fad diet
- Protein poisoning
