= Protein Power =

Commercial diet strategy

Protein Power, 1996

Protein Power is a high-protein, low carbohydrate fad diet developed by physician Michael R. Eades and his wife Mary Dan Eades.

== Overview ==
The Eades promoted the diet in their book Protein Power: The High-Protein/Low Carbohydrate Way to Lose Weight, Feel Fit, and Boost Your Health-in Just Weeks!, first published in 1996.

The idea behind Protein Power is that reducing the intake of carbohydrates will reduce the amount of insulin released into the body. According to the diet, insulin controls the storage of fat which is triggered by the intake of carbohydrates. Protein Power promotes an animal-based diet rich in red meat and eggs. The claims of the diet have not been scientifically demonstrated.

Protein Power has been described as a fad diet and pseudoscientific. High-protein diets such as Protein Power may bring about temporary weight loss via calorie restriction but are not effective for permanent weight control.

== Criticism ==
Nutritionists Fredrick J. Stare and Elizabeth Whelan criticized the diet as "too lopsided to be healthful" and the Eades for assembling their own "facts" into an "antiscience hypothesis". They noted that "At a time when many years of scientific research are beginning to establish the unequivocal association between plant foods and disease prevention, it strikes us as unconscionable for two medical doctors to be striking out in the opposite direction."

In 2001, the American Heart Association’s Nutrition Committee issued a strong recommendation against high-protein diets including Protein Power and the Atkins diet. The committee noted potential health risks of high-protein diets and how there are no long-term scientific studies to support their efficacy and safety.

Protein Power restricts healthful foods such as beans and whole grains, and lacks in calcium. The diet is hard to follow in the long term and disadvantages include poor stamina and ketosis. The high-protein content may be a strain on the kidneys, and medical experts recommend that individuals with chronic kidney disease avoid the diet. The diet is high in saturated fat and total fat.

High-protein low-carbohydrate diets like Protein Power that are high in animal protein and lack fiber, minerals and vitamins may increase the risk of coronary heart disease, cancer and osteoporosis. Negative effects of the diet include bad breath, constipation, fatigue and nausea.

== See also ==
- Low-carbohydrate diet
