= Samm Sinclair Baker =

American writer (1909–1997)

Samm S. Baker in 1969

Samm Sinclair Baker (born in Paterson, New Jersey, July 29, 1909 – March 5, 1997) was the author/co-author of many how-to and self-help books, most notably The Complete Scarsdale Medical Diet which he co-authored with Dr. Herman Tarnower.

He also co-authored four books with Dr. Irwin Maxwell Stillman, including The Doctor's Quick Weight Loss Diet. Baker obtained a bachelor's degree in economics from the University of Pennsylvania.

He was one of the original founders of Stern's Nurseries, developers of Miracle-Gro, and authored several books on gardening.

Baker died in New York in 1997.

== Selected publications ==
- Miracle Gardening (1958)
- Miracle Gardening Encyclopedia (1961)
- The Doctor’s Quick Weight Loss Diet (with Irwin Stillman, 1967)
- The Doctor’s Quick Inches-Off Diet (with Irwin Stillman, 1969)
- The Doctor’s Quick Teen-Age Diet (with Irwin Stillman, 1971)
- Dr. Stillman’s 14-Day Shape-Up Program (with Irwin Stillman, 1974)
- The Complete Scarsdale Medical Diet (with Herman Tarnower, 1978)
- Delicious Quick-Trim Diet (1985)
