= Jean-Michel Cohen =

French nutritionist (born 1956)

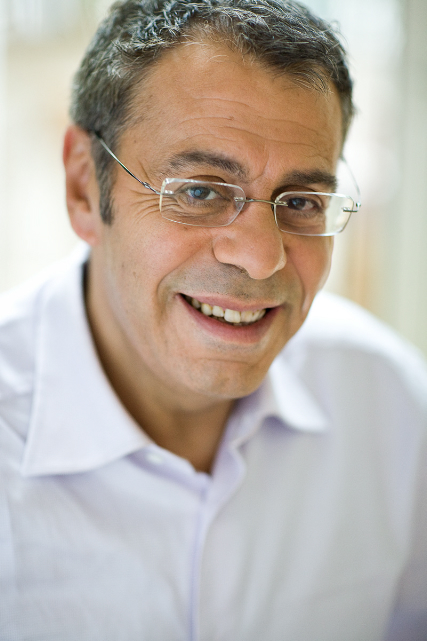
- Born: 22 May 1956 (age 70)
- Occupation: Nutritionist
- Known for: Savoir Maigrir, The Parisian Diet, The Bon Appétit Diet

Jean-Michel Cohen (born 22 May 1956) is a French nutritionist and author, best known for the Parisian Diet.

== Biography ==
Cohen received his M.D and PhD in nutrition from the Paris Diderot University in 1983, after which he worked as a nutritional consultant for a research laboratory from 1982 to 1986. In 1986, he founded one of the first poly-disciplinary consultation centers in the Paris region. He frequently appears on TV shows in France as a nutrition expert. He is married to Myriam Cohen, and together, they have three children.

He wrote his first book, Savoir Maigrir (Know How to Lose Weight), published by Groupe Flammarion, in 2002.

In 2004, Cohen was awarded the French National Order of Merit for his contributions in implementing a nutritional label system in France.

In 2007, Savoir Maigrir was adapted as an online weight loss coaching program.

In 2011, Cohen critiqued the Dukan Diet, saying that the low-carb diet was dangerous and could lead to long-term problems. Pierre Dukan, the diet's founder, sued Cohen for libel, but lost the case.

In 2012, Cohen released his first book in English, The Parisian Diet: How to Reach Your Right Weight and Stay There, along with its online version.

In 2015, the Order of Doctors in France prohibits him from practicing medicine for two years, one year suspended, for having contravened the obligation to refrain from any advertising process and the ban on practicing medicine as a business. The nutritionist filed an appeal with the Council of State, on 27 June the Council of State suspended this decision at his request and in March 2017 he confirmed it with a fine of 2000 euros to pay National Council of the Order of Physicians for expenses incurred

== Selected publications ==
- Savoir Maigrir (Know How to Lose Weight) (2002)
- Au bonheur de maigrir (2003)
- Savoir manger : le guide des aliments (2004, re-released in 2006).
- Bien manger en famille, (2005)
- Le roman des régimes, (2007)
- La vérité sur nos aliments (2011)
- The Parisian Diet: How to Reach Your Right Weight and Stay There (2012)
