= The Online Journal of Current Clinical Trials =

- Discipline: Medicine
- Language: English
- Edited by: Edward Huth

Publication details
- History: 1992-1996
- Publisher: 1992-1994: AAAS & OCLC; 1994-1996: Chapman & Hall (United States, then United Kingdom)
- Frequency: Continuous publication
- Open access: No

Standard abbreviations
- ISO 4: Online J. Curr. Clin. Trials

Indexing
- ISSN: 1059-2725

Links
- Journal homepage

The Online Journal of Current Clinical Trials was one of the first peer-reviewed online-only journals, publishing research articles, reviews, meta-analyses and letters relating to clinical trials from 1992 to 1996. It was founded by the American Association for the Advancement of Science (AAAS) and Online Computer Library Center (OCLC). Access to the articles was lost when the journal closed in 1996 after being sold, but some access was restored in 2018.

== History ==
Plans by AAAS and OCLC for a digital journal began in 1989 and were announced in 1990. The journal launched on July 1, 1992, edited by Edward Huth, who was earlier the editor of Annals of Internal Medicine. As part of Primary Journals Online, AAAS was responsible for the editorial processes and OCLC for the technology side. Peer review was also done online. One aim of the journal was to reduce the time until publication of medical research.

The launch was postponed from April due to technical difficulties, but it already had 1000 subscribers in the month of its launch and won the 1992 Database Product of the Year Award.

The first issue published three clinical trials and several opinion pieces. Submissions were lower than anticipated; Cliff McKnight and colleagues noted that "Paradoxically, although the system was designed to be accessed directly by readers, it seems to have received a more enthusiastic reception from the information profession than from end users."

AAAS sold the journal in 1994 to Chapman & Hall (later part of CRC Press and then Taylor & Francis), who hosted the journal at www.chapmanhall.com/cu.html. Library and information scientist Robin Peek noted in the mid-'90s that "Mounting a single journal is particularly problematic because most institutions are not willing to adapt their delivery infrastructure for one, or even a dozen, unique journal titles. Thus, even with the Internet, there remains the problem of achieving the needed mass."

By 1996 OJCCT was the second-most cited electronic journal with 190 citations, and while its total citations in 1995 were "well below the median medical journal", "the average article in OJCCT [was] cited more than 88 percent of the e-journals indexed by JCR." As of 1996, OJCCT had published the then most-cited article in any electronic journal, a review of breast cancer screening.

=== Closure and preservation ===
Despite the impact of the journal, it closed in 1996 and access was lost as no plans were made for preservation of the content. The former editors, including associate editor Kay Dickersin of Johns Hopkins School of Public Health, had considered putting copies of articles online but "we don't want to get into trouble".

In March 2018, access was finally restored to over 50 of the around 80 articles by the digital preservation service Portico, with the permission of the copyright holder Taylor & Francis, after Dickersin worked with the JHU Sheridan Libraries, including librarian Mariyam Thohira, to organize an effort to find copies of the articles from colleagues and in libraries. The editor, Huth, provided many articles on a CD-ROM. Portico are seeking the missing content, which they hope may be in researchers' personal hardcopy archives.

== Technical details ==
The journal was accessible with an online subscription, initially costing US$110 per year via CompuServe and OCLC Net, using either GUI software called Guidon that used SGML and ran on DOS on an IBM-compatible computer or the Electronic Publishing Service, a more limited ASCII format also available on the internet. The system requirements were high for the time: an Intel 286 with 2 MB memory running Windows 3.0. By 1995, three more journals were available via Guidon on the Electronic Journals Online platform: The Online Journal of Knowledge Synthesis for Nursing, Electronics Letters Online, and APL Online.

The journal was indexed on MEDLINE (and, from January 1994, Index Medicus), BIOSIS and WorldCat.

Articles in OJCCT were published within 24 hours after the decision to accept. Access and support was limited to Monday-Friday 6am-10pm (Eastern Daylight Time), Saturday 8am-8pm, Sunday 12pm-8pm. Unlike other electronic journals at the time, the articles included figures and tables as well as typeset text. Downloading articles cost extra and printed copies could also be ordered from the publisher for a fee.

== Legacy ==
"The journal was revolutionary, as its publishing was to be wholly electronic - manuscripts would be submitted, peer-reviewed, and edited without ever being printed."

— Robin Henshaw, First Monday

OJCCT was the first online-only full text journal with graphics, and was followed by many other electronic journals, as they were called at the time, which changed how librarians provided content to their users and how publishers priced their content. By 1996, there were 115 electronic STM journals.

The journal was the first electronic content to be indexed in Index Medicus. OJCCT introduced what is now called continuous publication, publishing articles as they are accepted rather than in an issue, with no space restrictions. In the first editorial, Huth promoted "the virtues of hypertext, the space electronic publishing offers for providing actual study data, and the ability to update meta-analyses". The journal was one of the first to have guidelines for the reporting of clinical trials and to encourage the publication of negative results.
