= Dukan Diet =

Fad diet

The Dukan Diet is a high-protein low-carbohydrate fad diet devised by Pierre Dukan.

== Description ==
The Dukan diet is a high-protein, low-carbohydrate diet with four phases, each of which has specific rules.The four phases are named the attack phase, the cruise phase, the consolidation phase, and the stabilization phase.

== History ==
In 1975, Pierre Dukan was a general practitioner in Paris when he was first confronted with a case of obesity. At the time, being overweight or obese was thought to be best treated by low calorie and small sized meals. Dukan thought of an alternative way to prevent patients from regaining their lost weight. He designed a new approach in four phases, including stabilisation and consolidation. After more than 20 years of research Pierre Dukan published his findings in 2000 in his book Je ne sais pas maigrir (I don't know how to get slimmer), which became a best seller.

In July 2011, a French court ruled against Dukan in his attempt to sue rival nutritionist Jean-Michel Cohen for libel, after Cohen had criticised his method in the press.

In 2013, Dukan, then aged 72, was banned from practising as a GP in France for eight days for breaching medical ethics by prescribing a diet pill to one of his patients in the 1970s that was later pulled from the market.

== Related diets ==
Pierre Dukan said the paleo diet was a copy of his weight loss strategy. The paleo diet is claimed to be based on the human ancestral diet. Other similar diets include the ketogenic diet, being low carb, moderate protein, and high fats; and the Atkins diet, being low carb, high protein, and moderate fats.

== Promotion and media exposure ==
Dukan has been promoting his diet since the 1970s; it gained a wider audience after the 2000 publication of his book, The Dukan Diet, which has sold more than 7 million copies globally. The book was released in the United Kingdom in May 2010, and in the United States in April 2011.

The French magazine L'Express' list of the 20 top-selling non-fiction books for the week of 27 December 2010 ranked La méthode Dukan illustrée in 19th place.

Channel Four included the diet in the programme Will my crash diet kill me? on 26 January 2011.

The American spokesperson for the diet is culinary dietitian Gina Keatley.

== Reception ==
The Dukan diet is categorized as a commercial fad diet and carries some risk of causing chronic kidney disease and worsened cardiovascular health. It is unclear whether it helps people lose weight or increase their glucose tolerance. Nephrolithiasis is a potential side effect of the diet that is of particular concern to people with a history of kidney stone formation.

The British Dietetic Association have named the Dukan Diet the number 1 "diet to avoid".

== See also ==
- List of diets
- Protein-sparing modified fast
