= Laura Geller (makeup artist) =

American makeup artist

- Born: 1958 (age 66–67); Bronx, NY
- Occupation: Makeup artist
- Known for: Founder of Laura Geller Beauty

Laura Geller is an American makeup artist. The founder of Laura Geller Make-up Studios and Laura Geller Beauty, she has worked in theatre and television.

== Early life ==
Laura Geller was born in the Bronx neighborhood of New York in 1958. She lived in Rockland County as a child, and later moved to the Upper East Side of Manhattan.

== Career ==
She founded Laura Geller Make-up Studios in New York City in 1993, and has worked as a freelance cosmetics artist. Starting in the early 1990s, in addition to working with theatrical actors on Broadway, her work has appeared on television series aired on CBS, NBC, AMC, and HBO. She has also provided cosmetic tips in publications such as Cosmopolitan magazine. Crain’s New York Business also named her a top entrepreneur for the year 2012.

== Laura Geller Beauty ==
In addition to her work as a make-up designer for individual clients, she also created an eponymous cosmetics line sold on QVC. Geller founded the company in 1997. She appears on QVC in North America and Europe in order to sell the line during television segments dedicated to her brand. Her product lines are generally made for middle aged women. She first sold her company to Glanasol, and the company later sold to AS Beauty in 2019, though has remained working with the company. In 2023 the company was noted as the fastest growing digital beauty and cosmetics brand in the US by Business Insider.
