= Barry Sears =

American biochemist and author

- Born: June 6, 1947 (age 79); Long Beach, California, U.S.
- Education: Palisades Charter High School; Occidental College; Indiana University
- Occupation: Medical researcher
- Known for: Zone diet
- Notable work: The Zone: A Dietary Road Map (1995)
- Website: drsears.com

Barry Sears (born June 6, 1947) is an American biochemist and author best known for creating and promoting the Zone diet.

== Biography ==
As stated in several of his books, the Zone diet was born of his desire to avoid an early death from a premature heart attack, a fate of which all other men in his family had been early victims. In more recent years, Sears has popularized the use of high-dose Omega-3 fatty acids and polyphenols to further reduce inflammation. He began studying lipids primarily because their difficulty in studying made them an under-examined field of research.

He released his first book in 1995, The Zone: A Dietary Road Map. It went on to sell over 2 million hardback copies and was a No. 1 New York Times best-seller. Since then he has frequently appeared in the US media, including CNN, Forbes and Good Morning America.

== Career and Zone diet ==
Sears began his business career in 1976, as the founder and president of one of the first biotechnology startup companies in Massachusetts developing lipid-based delivery systems for cancer drugs. Sears believed that the drug delivery principles could be applied to diet, in order to control the levels of eicosanoids to ultimately control inflammation.

In 1995, Sears released his first book, The Zone: A Dietary Road Map. The Zone, went on to become a No. 1 New York Times best-seller and sold over two million copies in the United States. In 1997, Sears released his second book, Mastering the Zone. The book again went on to become another New York Times best-seller and sold over 1 million copies in the United States. He has also authored a low-carbohydrate cookbook.

Sears continued to apply his dietary approach to other areas of health influenced by inflammation, and published his first book on anti-aging, The Anti-Aging Zone, in 1999.

Over the next decade, Sears studied and released a number of books based on what he said was the linkage between diet and inflammation.

In 2008, he released the book Toxic Fat: When Good Fat Turns Bad that described obesity as a form of cancer. Sears released his most recent book, The Mediterranean Zone, in 2014, focusing on the role of polyphenols in the inflammatory response. Currently, Sears has published 15 books that have sold more than 6 million copies in the United States. Sears continues his research as the president of the non-profit Inflammation Research Foundation in Peabody, Massachusetts.
