= Henry Buchwald =

Austrian-American surgeon and academic

- Born: June 21, 1932 (age 94); Vienna, Austria
- Citizenship: United States of America
- Education: Columbia University College of Physicians and Surgeons
- Known for: Implantable insulin pump, gastric bypass, cholesterol
- Scientific career
- Fields: Surgery, biomedical engineering
- Workplaces: University of Minnesota

Henry Buchwald (born June 21, 1932) is an Austrian-American surgeon and academic. He is the Professor of Surgery and Biomedical Engineering and the Owen and Sarah Davidson Wangensteen Chair in Experimental Surgery Emeritus at the University of Minnesota, Minneapolis, Minnesota.

== Early life and education ==
Buchwald was born in Vienna, Austria, in 1932 to Andor and Renee Buchwald. In 1938, his family fled Austria to survive the Nazis. Henry and his mother came to New York City where Renee supported them. In 1939, Henry's father, who was forced to hide and evade capture by the Nazis in his birthplace of Hungary while he waited for a place on the U.S.'s Hungarian Jewish quota, arrived in New York. Henry attended the Bronx High School of Science, and then Columbia College in New York City, graduating as class valedictorian with summa cum laude honor in 1954. He pursued further studies by attending Columbia University College of Physicians and Surgeons from which he graduated in 1957 with an M.D. degree.

He took his internship at the Columbia Presbyterian Hospital in 1957–58, and served in the U.S. Air Force as chief flight surgeon at Strategic Air Command (SAC) Headquarters in Bellevue, Nebraska, until the fall of 1960. After the service, Buchwald resumed his studying, earning an M.S. degree in biochemistry and Ph.D. in surgery.

== Career ==
During his more than 50 years at the University of Minnesota, Buchwald has been a surgeon, teacher, mentor, researcher, and inventor. He is Professor of Surgery and Biomedical Engineering, Director of Graduate Surgical Training, Director of Resident Training, and Director of In-Training Examination. He was the first Owen H. and Sarah Davidson Wangensteen Chair in Experimental Surgery from 2001 to 2004 and holds the post as Emeritus. In 2002, the Minnesota Medical Alumni Society of the University of Minnesota presented him with the Harold S. Diehl Lifetime Achievement Award for Outstanding Professional Contributions.

His long-term research interests include cholesterol and atherosclerosis, obesity surgery, implantable devices, hyperlipidemias, and measurement of blood oxygen transport. Early in his career, he discovered that the part of the small intestine called the ileum is the primary site for the absorption or cholesterol and bile acids (the primary end-products of cholesterol metabolism), and, that performing surgery—Buchwald's partial ileal bypass surgery—a procedure that bypasses part of the ileum, lowers cholesterol levels and dramatically improves the lives of those with familial hypercholesterolemia.

Buchwald trained with Richard Varco who performed the first obesity surgery in 1953. Since 1966, Buchwald has performed more than 4,000 obesity surgeries (also known as bariatric surgeries) and become one of the most influential and innovative surgeons in the field. As fellow bariatric surgeon Walter Pories said in a 2006 interview with Minnesota Monthly's Tim Gihring, "If you named maybe 10 international leaders [in bariatric surgery] . . . Henry would fall on any list that people in the field would make."

Throughout his career as a general surgeon, Buchwald has performed many thousands of surgeries, including all open gastrointestinal surgeries, partial ileal bypasses, jejunoileal bypasses, gastric bypasses, Fobi Pouch, vertical banded gastroplasty, roux-en-y bypasses, and duodenal switches.

His writing and influence also go into the realm of biomedical ethics and insurance reform. He has been president of the Central Surgical Association (1997–1998), the American Society of Bariatric Surgery (1998-1999), and the International Federation of Surgery for Obesity (2003-2004). He serves on editorial advisory board of the Bariatric Times, the editorial board of the Surgery for Obesity and Related Diseases, and is a co-editor of the journal, Obesity Surgery. He is a Fellow of the American Surgical Association, American College of Surgeons, Central Surgical Association, Epidemiology Council of the American Heart Association, and International College of Surgeons

Declining opportunities to enter private practice, Buchwald has continued to devote tremendous energy towards mentoring younger surgeons. In 2002, the 53rd Volume of the Surgical Forum was dedicated to Buchwald. In the dedication to that issue, Marshall Z. Schwartz lists some of Henry Buchwald's many accomplishments, commenting: "The above noted accomplishments and contributions alone warrant this dedication. But it has been Dr. Buchwald's strong commitment to mentoring many young individuals (which he proudly lists in his curriculum vitae), including medical students, residents (both surgical and medical), and graduate students, that has made him a great academic role model. What makes Dr. Buchwald unique is his lifelong commitment to his trainees."

== Research ==
Buchwald was still in his residency when he was granted his first research laboratory. At the time he was a Helen Hay Whitney Fellow. He studied histamine release, as well as groundbreaking work in lipids and the absorption of cholesterol. In 1973, The National Institute of Health (NIH) awarded Buchwald their largest investigator-initiated grant given to a principal investigator (one of the largest the University of Minnesota has ever received). The grant initiated the Program on the Surgical Control of the Hyperlipidemias (POSCH) trial. In 1990, the results of the first 17 years of this study were presented in the New England Journal of Medicine and at the annual meeting of the American College of Surgeons. The POSCH study definitely proved the link between cholesterol and heart disease. The POSCH trials demonstrated conclusively that lowering cholesterol can reduce heart disease and resultant heart attacks and, therefore, increase life expectancy. The results from all phases of the POSCH study have contributed significant insights and long-term data related to cholesterol, heart disease, and smoking. Buchwald has received seven additional NIH research grants.

Buchwald, who has a joint appointment at the University of Minnesota in Biomedical Engineering, holds 17 patents for medical devices. These include the world's first infusion port, peritoneovenous shunts, and specialty vascular catheters. He also invented the first implantable infusion pump, a precursor to implantable infusion pumps in use throughout the world today. He was inducted into the Minnesota Inventors Hall of Fame in 1988 for his extensive contributions to bioengineering devices.

In the late 1990s and early 2000s, Buchwald's research has included: Type II diabetes and its reduction through bariatric surgery; oxygen transport and the development of a device to measure it; heart disease in women; and new technological approaches to bariatric surgery. One of his latest projects is the development of a new type of bariatric surgery called micro-orifice surgery, surgery performed open (as opposed to laparoscopically) but with very small incisions (to avoid complications of general anesthesia and make patients' recovery faster and easier). His innovative research and development work continues.

== Publications ==
Buchwald has authored or co-authored more than 300 peer-reviewed manuscripts. He is the co-editor, with Walford Gillison, of Pioneers in Surgical Gastroenterology (2007), as well as the co-author, with George S.M. Cowan and Walter J. Pories, of Surgical Management of Obesity (2006). His newest title, Buchwald Atlas of Metabolic and Bariatric Surgery Techniques and Procedures, was published in fall 2011.

He has been section editor of ASAIO Transactions, editor of Chirurgia Generale, and of the Journal of American College of Nutrition. He has been on the editorial board of The Journal of Clinical Surgery. Infu-Systems International, Diabetes, Nutrition, and Metabolism, associate editor, of Journal of Bariatric Surgery , Obesity Surgery and the Online Journal of Current Clinical Trials, and a consulting editor for Hospital Medicine.

== Personal life ==
In 1954, he married his high school sweetheart, Daisy Emilie Bix. (Publicly known as Emilie Buchwald, she later co-founded the literary press Milkweed Editions and, after retirement, founded The Gryphon Press, a children's picture book publisher dedicated to animal issues). He, his wife, and their first daughter, Jane, moved to Minnesota in 1960 so that Buchwald could enter a residency program at the University of Minnesota Surgery Department, where Dr. Owen Harding Wangensteen was the chair. The Buchwald family settled in Minnesota permanently and raised their four daughters – Jane, Amy, Claire, and Dana – while Buchwald initiated what has been a more-than-50-year career at the University of Minnesota.

== Honors and awards ==
- First Prize, Res. Forum, American College of Chest Physicians, 1966
- Samuel D. Gross Award, Philadelphia, Philadelphia Academy of Surgery, 1967
- Distinguished Service Award, Association for Academic Surgery, 1976
- President, Minnesota Inventors Hall of Fame, 1989–1991
- The Meritorious Service Award in Research and Development, Medical Alley Association, March 29, 1990
- Annual Clinical Scholar Award, University of Minnesota Medical School, 1991
- American Surgical Association representative to the Council of Academic Societies/Association of American Medical Colleges, 1992–1995
- Fairview-University Medical Center Joint Practice Committee, 1998
- Governor to American College of Surgeons representing the Central Surgical Association, 2000–2003
- Chair, Obesity Coalition, 1999–2004
- Chair, American College of Surgeons' National Faculty for Bariatric Surgery, 2003
- Fellow of the Royal College of Surgeons, British Obesity and Metabolic Surgery, 2014
- Jacobson Innovation Award, American College of Surgeons, 2019
