= American Association of Nutritional Consultants =

The American Association of Nutritional Consultants (AANC) is an organization based in Warsaw, Indiana, for nutritional and dietary consultants. It does not restrict its membership to those who have any verifiable credentials.

== Lack of scrutiny of membership applicants ==
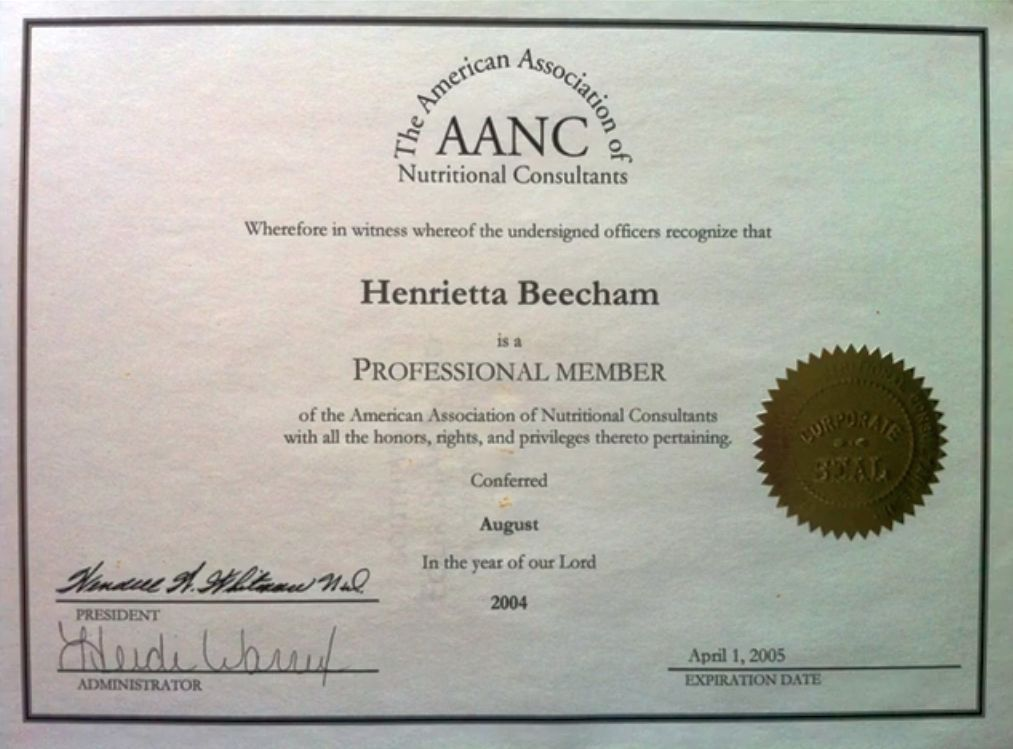
Membership certificate obtained by Ben Goldacre for his dead cat Hettie

The association runs no checks on the qualifications of its members. Science writer Ben Goldacre subscribed his deceased cat Henrietta as a professional member of the society for $60, and Australian nutritionist Rosemary Stanton obtained a membership for her late Old English Sheepdog. In 1983, nutrition scientist Victor Herbert subscribed a poodle and a cat; despite the wide publicity given to this fact, Herbert was able to subscribe another dog as a member the next year. Another person subscribed the pet hamster of his daughter, and another person was accepted after providing only a certificate from a nutrition diploma mill. The New York Times highlighted the group's scientific unreliability and lack of credibility in a review of a book by Ben Goldacre that discussed a membership in the association by the Scottish nutritionist, author and television personality Gillian McKeith.

As a result, the association has been criticized by Stephen Barrett of Quackwatch for offering memberships to unqualified individuals.

== Notable members ==
- Gillian McKeith.
