= Zone diet =

Type of fad diet

The Zone diet is a fad diet emphasizing low-carbohydrate consumption. It was created by Barry Sears, an American biochemist.

The ideas behind the diet are not supported by scientific evidence.

== Approach ==
The diet is meant to promote weight loss via reduction in calories consumed and avoid spikes in insulin release, thus supporting the maintenance of insulin sensitivity. It begins with the determination of the individual's protein requirement for daily replacement due to various loss mechanisms. The diet then adjusts carbohydrate and fat intake based on the person’s energy needs and weight loss goalsThe Zone diet proposes that a relatively narrow distribution in the ratio of proteins to carbohydrates, centered at 0.75, is essential to "balance the insulin to glucagon ratio, which purportedly affects eicosanoid metabolism and ultimately produces a cascade of biological events leading to a reduction in chronic disease risk, enhanced immunity, maximal physical and mental performance, increased longevity and permanent weight loss."

The diet advocates eating five times a day, with 3 meals and 2 snacks, and includes eating proteins, carbohydrates – those with a lower glycemic index are considered more favorable, and fats (monounsaturated fats are considered healthier) in a caloric ratio of 30%-40%-30% (fat-carb-pro). The hand is used as the mnemonic tool; five fingers for five times a day, with no more than five hours between meals. The size and thickness of the palm are used to measure protein while two big fists measure favorable carbohydrates and one fist unfavorable carbohydrates. There is a more complex scheme of "Zone blocks" and "mini-blocks" that followers of the diet can use to determine the ratios of macronutrients consumed. Daily exercise is encouraged.

The diet falls about midway in the continuum between the USDA-recommended food pyramid which advocates eating grains, vegetables, and fruit and reducing fat, and the high-fat Atkins Diet.

== Effectiveness ==
Like other low-carb diets, the ideas underlying the Zone diet are unproven.

As of 2013, there were "no cross-sectional or longitudinal studies examining the potential health merit of adopting a Zone Diet per se, [and] closely related peer-reviewed findings from scientific research cast strong doubt over the purported benefits of this diet. When properly evaluated, the ideas and arguments of popular low carbohydrate diet books like the Zone rely on poorly controlled, non-peer-reviewed studies, anecdotes and non-science rhetoric."

== See also ==
- Diet (nutrition)
- List of diets
- Low-carbohydrate diet
