= Andreas Marber =

German playwright and dramaturge (born 1961)

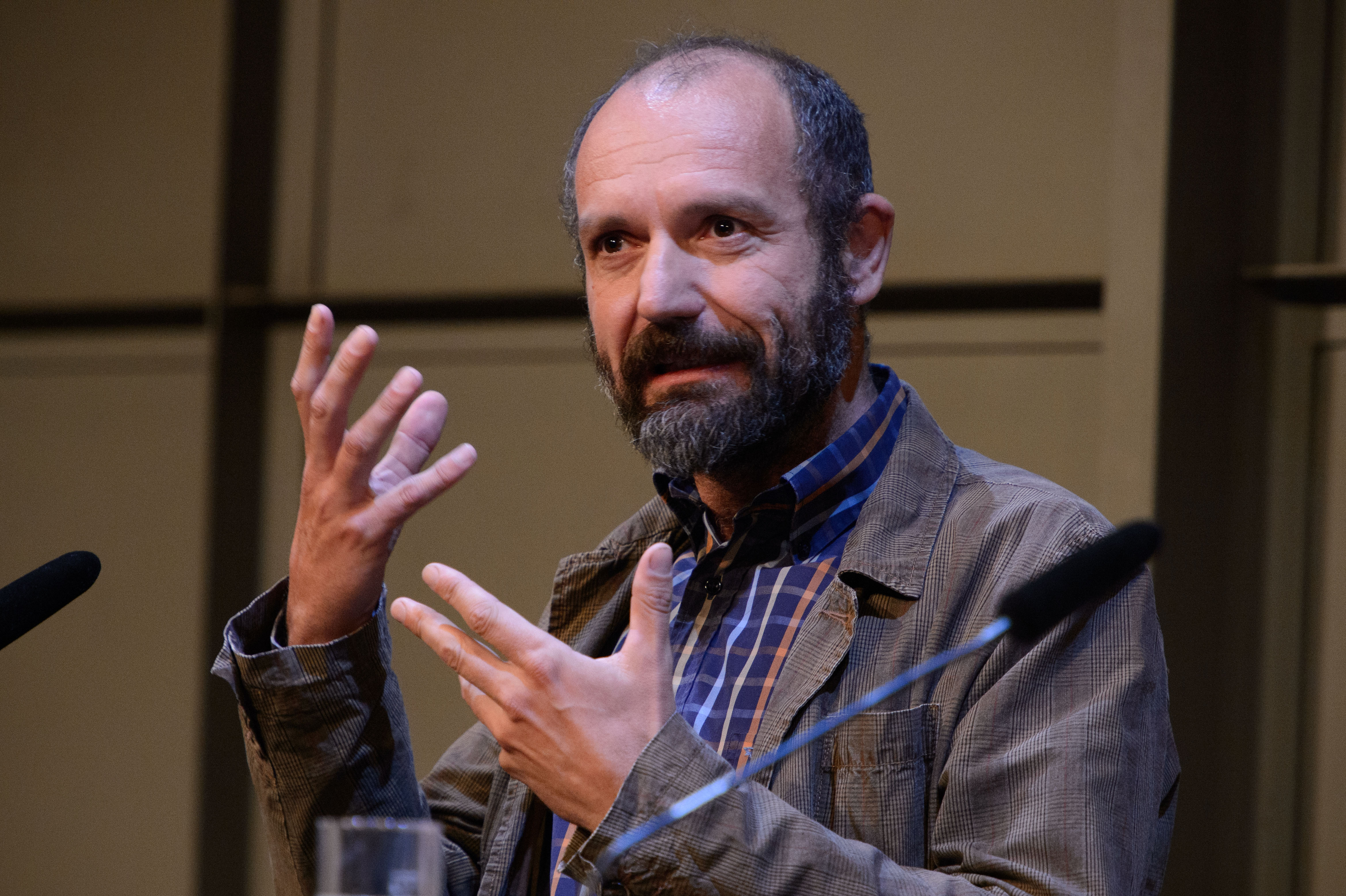
Andreas Marber, 2013

Andreas Marber (born 1961 in Radolfzell) is a German playwright and dramaturge.

Marber wrote began his career at the Children and Young People's State of Esslingen. In 1988 he moved to the Municipal Theater Bielefeld, 1989 to 1993 he worked under Friedrich Schirmer at the Theater Freiburg. After the change to the State Theater in Stuttgart in 1996, Marber worked as an executive dramaturge at the Schauspielhaus Bochum. After a short stint at the Schauspielhaus in Hamburg in 2000, he worked as a freelance writer and now lives in Hamburg.

Marber has worked among others with Stephan Kimmig, Jürgen Kruse, Leander Haußmann, and Johann Kresnik. In 1994 he received a scholarship from the Arts Foundation of Stuttgart. In 1995 he received the Schiller Memorial Prize of Baden-Wuerttemberg.

Besides his own pieces, he wrote numerous adaptations, including Lüsistrata (1984), Der 'kleine Unterschied' und seine großen Folgen (1991) und Beat Generation (2007).
