= Stillman diet =

High protein low carbohydrate diet

The Stillman diet is a high-protein, low-carbohydrate diet devised in 1967 by physician Irwin Maxwell Stillman (1896–1975). It focuses mostly on the complete avoidance of both fats and carbohydrates, and requires the consumption of at least eight glasses of water per day. The diet is very low in fiber, vitamins and minerals, and it eliminates the consumption of bread, fruit, sugar and alcohol.

The diet was popularized in the late 1960s with the publication of Stillman and Samm Sinclair Baker's book The Doctor's Quick Weight Loss Diet, although it was criticized by some physicians who believed that the diet was unbalanced and could negatively affect those who follow it.

== Overview ==
Stillman and Samm Sinclair Baker coauthored the book The Doctor's Quick Weight Loss Diet, which first detailed the Stillman diet in 1967. The animal-based high-protein diet includes lean beef, veal, chicken, turkey, fish, eggs and non-fat cottage cheese. Spices, tabasco sauce, herbs, salt and pepper are also allowed. Condiments, butter, dressings and any kind of fat or oil are not permitted. Tea, coffee and noncaloric soft drinks may be consumed, but only in addition to the eight daily glasses of water required. It is also recommended that dieters eat six small meals per day instead of three large ones.

The diet restricts carbohydrates, similar to the Atkins diet, although the Atkins diet allows significant fat consumption.

== Karen Carpenter ==
American singer Karen Carpenter began following the diet in her teens. She was 5'4" and weighed 145 pounds when she began the diet in 1967. In 1983, she died of complications related to anorexia nervosa.

== Reception ==
The Stillman diet has been criticized by some medical experts and nutritionists as a fad diet. Physician Terrence T. Kuske wrote:

It induces a degree of diuresis because of the low carbohydrate, but is a relatively unpalatable diet. Adherence to the diet induces fatigue, nausea and lassitude or exhaustion. Long-term use of this diet, because of its composition, may induce vitamin deficiency. Studies of individuals following the Stillman Diet have demonstrated quite conclusively that it raises the serum cholesterol, with its attendant risks.

== See also ==
- List of diets
- Scarsdale diet
