= Ian Marber =

British nutritionist

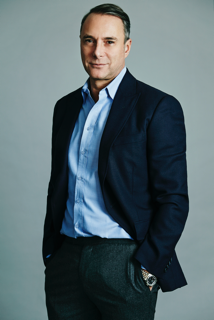

Ian Marber (born 1963), is a nutrition therapist, well-known author and one of the founders of The Food Doctor, developing the brand from its inception in 1999 until his departure in December 2011. The Food Doctor positioned itself in the field of healthier eating with a range of both of fresh and dried food products, online consultancy as well as personal consultations.

Marber's nutrition consultancy was based on one-to-one consultations, health and cookbooks. He believes in a simple, sensible and achievable roadmap for personal health and wellbeing. According to Marber "We believe that the correct nutrition is the cornerstone to good health and vitality, and design foods to achieve this backed up by fact."

Ian Marber is a member of Coeliac UK and has promoted public awareness of the disease.

== Early life and education ==
In 1993, Marber's life changed after receiving a correct diagnosis of coeliac disease having been for many years diagnosed incorrectly with irritable bowel syndrome. This inspired him to switch careers to study as a nutritional therapist.

Marber trained at the Institute for Optimum Nutrition (I.O.N) in Richmond, South West London, founded in 1984 by fellow nutritional therapist Patrick Holford. In 1994, Marber gained his Nutritional Therapy Diploma. Since then he's been made a Fellow at the Institute. He remains one or their highest profile graduates. In 2009 at the 25th anniversary celebration of the I.O.N he was awarded the Best Media Advocate for his extensive publications and media presence.

== Early career ==
In 2000, The Food Doctor launched its first nutritionally driven dried food product Original Seed Mix, with a further 36 products added to the range in 2002; Tesco immediately took it on. The range was extended to over 50 items.

The various food products in the range were designed to adhere to a set of nutritional principles, and were stocked by several multiples in the UK, including J Sainsbury, Tesco, Waitrose and Asda.

Marber stepped down The Food Doctor 1 January 2012 and is working as an independent nutrition, food and health consultant.

== Television shows ==
In 2002, Marber became a regular guest on the Channel 4 show Richard and Judy. Over a period of seven years, he would discuss relevant news features and viewers' dieting concerns with hosts Richard Madeley and Judy Finnegan. In the final year of the show, Marber presented two ten-week strands, "House Calls" and "Fat Boys Slim", which culminated in five overweight viewers losing weight and performing "The Full Monty" on the final episode of Richard and Judy.

Marber's television career was given a boost in 2005 with The Discovery Home & Health Channel running a 15-part show, "The A-List Diet". The show was well received and gained a solid fan base, seeing some repeats over the weekend. The show was subsequently shown on the Discovery Home & Health channel in Australia, Malaysia, Singapore and Hong Kong.

The Sunday Mirror described the diet as a "seven-day detox… based around eating five small meals a day which are a mixture of carbs and protein to keep blood-sugar levels steady and hunger pangs at bay."

== Publications ==
Marber's first big publishing break came in 1999 through Collins and Brown who were in the process of creating a health division. The book was titled The Food Doctor: Healing Foods for the Mind and Body and co-authored with Vicki Edgson a fellow I.O.N graduate. “To date the book has sold in excess of 500 000 copies, a third of which has been in the US. The book has been translated into Spanish, Slovenian, Norwegian, French, Russian and Swedish.”

The success of the first book accelerated the public profile of the brand and two further publications followed shortly on its heels: The Food Doctor in the City (his first solo book) and In Bed with The Food Doctor, once again co-authored with Vicki Edgson.

The Food Doctor brand has not been without controversy in the media, for the liberal use of the word "doctor". In 2004, he was publicly criticised by science writer and GP Ben Goldacre (author of The Guardian newspapers weekly 'Bad Science' column), for being in the running for an "Award for outstanding innovation in the use of the title "Doctor"”. Although it was acknowledged that Marber did not actually use or claim the title of Dr when consulting.

Nonetheless this misappropriation of the word doctor also caught the interest of the Nutrition Society who felt it was "misleading". However The Food Doctor brand remained safe, with the ASA agreeing to its trademark usage.

Marber followed this with a series of books about weight loss although he was initially reluctant to write about diet working with publishers Dorling Kindersley. The series included four books which were eventually published as one in 2008 (The Food Doctor Ultimate Diet).

His publication on Supereating published in 2008 by Quadrille, focuses on getting more from your food. This booked was well received by the media with stellar reviews from the women's magazine Marie Claire (February 2009), further reviews were cited by other UK newspapers.

The publication in 2010, How Not To Get Fat addresses dieting from a completely different angle with Marber addressing the psychological side of dieting alongside people's emotional relationships with food.

In January 2011, Marber's book was published by Quadrille, How Not To Get Fat;Your Daily Diet which included a hundred recipes by Carolyn Humphries, a former Head Chef, and prolific food writer.

In May 2014 Ian Marber published Eat Your Way to Lower Cholesterol co-authored with Dr Laura Corr, consultant cardiologist at Guy's and St Thomas's Hospitals with recipes by Dr Sarah Scheneker.

April 2019 saw the publication of Manfood, a ‘no nonsense’ guide to nutrition for men in the 40s and upwards. The book entered Amazon's top 10 on the day of publication and was a best seller in three health categories on the same day. Manfood was featured in The Times as well as BBC Breakfast.

== Current work ==
Marber writes for Attitude, New magazine, Natural Health, The Mail on Sunday, The Times Body and Soul, The Spectator and Balance, part of Diabetes UK.

Ian reopened clinic books to see private clients with rooms in Kensington, west London, and in Harley Street, in Londons medical district.

== Bibliography ==
- The Food Doctor: Healing Foods for the Mind and Body (9 Sep 1999)
- The Food Doctor in the City (14 Sep 2000)
- Bed with the Food Doctor (20 Sep 2001)
- Az Etelunk a Gyogyszerunk (2002)
- En La Cama Con El Doctor Comida (2 Aug 2003)
- The Food Doctor Diet (8 Jan 2004)
- Die Food-Doctor-Diät. (31 Mar 2004)
- The Food Doctor: Healing Foods for Mind and Body (1 May 2004)
- The Food Doctor Daily Diet: DK Publishing (27 Dec 2004)
- The Food Doctor Everyday Diet (6 Jan 2005)
- Food Doctor 50 Ways to Change How You Eat (24 Nov 2005)
- The Food Doctor Everyday Diet Cookbook (5 Jan 2006)
- The Food Doctor Diet Club: Join Ian's Workshop for Dramatic Weight Loss with Day-by-day Support (4 Jan 2007)
- The Food Doctor Ultimate Diet: Changing the Way You Eat for Good (10 Jan 2008)
- Supereating (5 Dec 2008)
- Forme et santé dans votre assiette (24 Mar 2009)
- How Not To Get Fat (1 Jan 2010)
- How Not to Get Fat – Your Daily Diet (7 Jan 2011)
- Eat Your Way to Lower Your Cholesterol (May 2014)
- Manfood (March 2019)
