= Ellen Burstyn on screen and stage =

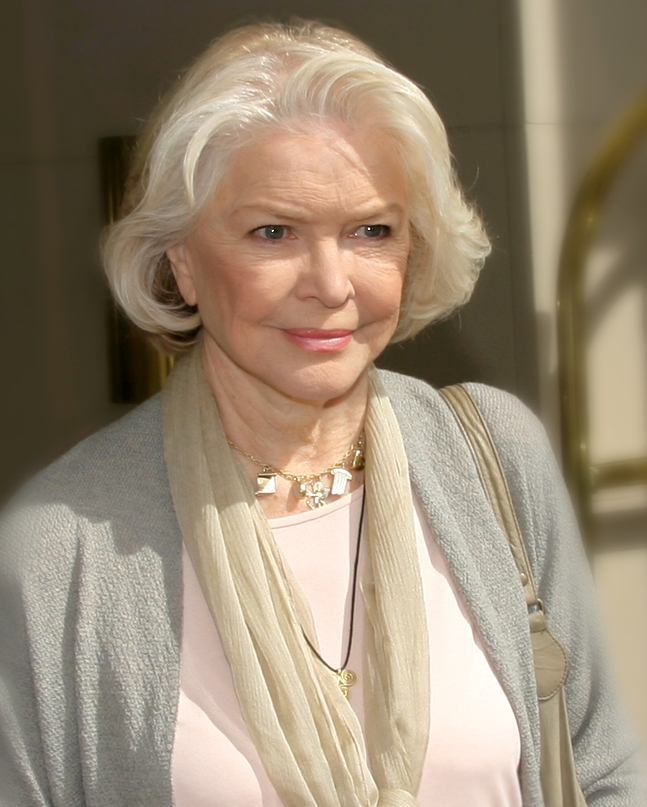
Burstyn at the 2007 Toronto International Film Festival

Ellen Burstyn is an American actress of stage and screen.

She is known for her film performances in Peter Bogdanovich's The Last Picture Show (1971), William Friedkin's The Exorcist (1973), Martin Scorsese's Alice Doesn't Live Here Anymore (1974), and Requiem for a Dream (2000). She also has appeared in such films as Harry and Tonto (1974), Same Time, Next Year (1978), and Resurrection (1980).

She is also known for her performances in television such as Big Love (2007–2011), Political Animals (2012), Louie (2014), and House of Cards (2016).

== Film ==
Year	Title	Role	Notes	Ref.
1964	Goodbye Charlie	Frannie Salzman	Credited as Ellen McRae	
1964	For Those Who Think Young	Dr. Pauline Thayer	Credited as Ellen McRae	
1969	Pit Stop (original title: The Winner)	Ellen McLeod	Credited as Ellen McRae	
1970	Alex in Wonderland	Beth Morrison		
1970	Tropic of Cancer	Mona Miller		
1971	The Last Picture Show	Lois Farrow		
1972	The King of Marvin Gardens	Sally		
1973	The Exorcist	Chris MacNeil		
1974	Alice Doesn't Live Here Anymore	Alice Hyatt		
1974	Harry and Tonto	Shirley Mallard		
1977	Providence	Sonia Langham		
1978	A Dream of Passion	Brenda		
1978	Same Time, Next Year	Doris		
1980	Resurrection	Edna Mae McCauley		
1981	Silence of the North	Olive Frederickson		
1984	The Ambassador	Alex Hacker		
1984	Terror in the Aisles		Archival footage	
1985	Twice in a Lifetime	Kate MacKenzie		
1987	Dear America: Letters Home from Vietnam	Mrs. Stocks (voice)		
1988	Hanna's War	Katalin		
1990	The Color of Evening	Kate O'Rielly		
1991	Grand Isle	Mademoiselle Reisz		
1991	Dying Young	Mrs. O'Neil		
1993	The Cemetery Club	Esther Moskowitz		
1994	When a Man Loves a Woman	Emily		
1995	How to Make an American Quilt	Hy Dodd		
1995	The Baby-Sitters Club	Emily Haberman		
1995	Roommates	Judith		
1996	The Spitfire Grill	Hannah Ferguson		
1997	Deceiver	Mook		
1998	Playing by Heart	Mildred		
1998	You Can Thank Me Later	Shirley Cooperberg		
1999	Walking Across Egypt	Mattie Rigsbee		
2000	Requiem for a Dream	Sara Goldfarb		
2000	The Yards	Val Handler		
2002	Divine Secrets of the Ya-Ya Sisterhood	Viviane Joan "Vivi" Abbott Walker		
2002	Red Dragon	Grandma Dolarhyde (voice only)	Uncredited	
2005	Down in the Valley	Ma		
2006	The Fountain	Dr. Lilian Guzetti		
2006	The Wicker Man	Sister Summersisle		
2006	The Elephant King	Diana Hunt		
2006	30 Days	Maura		
2007	The Stone Angel	Hagar Shipley		
2008	Lovely, Still	Mary		
2008	W.	Barbara Bush		
2009	The Velveteen Rabbit	Swan	Voice role	
2009	According to Greta	Katherine		
2009	PoliWood	Herself	Documentary	
2009	The Loss of a Teardrop Diamond	Miss Adie		
2010	The Mighty Macs	Mother St. John		
2010	Main Street	Georgiana Carr		
2011	Another Happy Day	Doris		
2011	Someday This Pain Will Be Useful to You	Nanette		
2013	Wish You Well	Louisa Mae Cardinal		
2014	Two Men in Town	Garnett's mother		
2014	River of Fundament	Hafertiti #1		
2014	Draft Day	Barb Weaver		
2014	Interstellar	Old Murph		
2014	The Calling	Emily Micallef		
2014	When Marnie Was There	Nanny	Voice	
2015	The Age of Adaline	Flemming		
2015	Unity	Narrator	Documentary	
2015	About Scout	Gram		
2016	Wiener-Dog	Nana		
2016	Custody	Beatrice Fisher		
2017	The House of Tomorrow	Josephine Prendergast	Also executive producer	
2017	All I Wish	Celia Berges		
2018	Nostalgia	Helen Greer		
2018	The Tale	Nettie		
2019	American Woman	Miss Dolly		
2019	Lucy in the Sky	Nana Holbrook		
2020	Pieces of a Woman	Elizabeth Weiss		
2021	Queen Bees	Helen Wilson		
2022	Three Months	Valerie		
2023	Mother, Couch	Mother		
2023	The Exorcist: Believer	Chris MacNeil		
2026	Place to Be	Brooke		
2026	Flesh Impact	Marilyn Monroe	Short film	

== Television ==
Year	Title	Role	Notes	Ref.
1958	Kraft Television Theatre	Linda	Episode: "Trick or Treat"; credited as Ellen McRae	
1961	Michael Shayne	Carol	Episode: "Strike Out"; credited as Ellen McRae	
1961	The Loretta Young Show	Ann Walters	Episode: "Woodlot"; credited as Ellen McRae	
1961	Dr. Kildare	Anne Garner	Episode: "Second Chance"; credited as Ellen McRae	
1961	Surfside 6	Wandra Drake	Episode: "Double Image"; credited as Ellen McRae	
1961, 1963	77 Sunset Strip	Betty Benson (1961) / Sandra Keene (1963)	2 episodes; credited as Ellen McRae	
1961	Cheyenne	Emmy Mae	Episode: "Day's Pay"; credited as Ellen McRae	
1961	The Dick Powell Show	Rose Maxon	Episode: "Ricochet"; credited as Ellen McRae	
1962, 1971	Gunsmoke	Polly Mims (1962) / Amy Waters (1971)	3 episodes; credited as Ellen McRae (1962), credited as Ellen Burstyn (1971)	
1962	Ben Casey	Dr. Leslie Fraser (ep. 1) / Connie (ep. 2)	2 episodes; credited as Ellen McRae	
1962	Bus Stop	Phyllis Dunning	Episode: "Cry to Heaven"; credited as Ellen McRae	
1962	Checkmate	Margo	Episode: "The Bold and the Tough"; credited as Ellen McRae	
1962	The Many Loves of Dobie Gillis	Dr. Donna Whittaker	Episode: "A Splinter Off the Old Block"; credited as Ellen McRae	
1962	Perry Mason	Mona Winthrope White	Episode: "The Case of the Dodging Domino"; credited as Ellen McRae	
1962	The Real McCoys	Dorothy Carter	Episode: "The Girl Veterinarian"; credited as Ellen McRae	
1962	I'm Dickens, He's Fenster	Joan	Episode: "Harry, the Father Image"; credited as Ellen McRae	
1963	Laramie	Amy	Episode: "No Place to Run"; credited as Ellen McRae	
1963	The Defenders	Hilda Wesley	Episode: "The Heathen"; credited as Ellen McRae	
1963	Going My Way	Louise	Episode: "Hear No Evil"; credited as Ellen McRae	
1963	Wagon Train	Margaret Whitlow	Episode: "The Jim Whitlow Story"; credited as Ellen McRae	
1963	Vacation Playhouse	Ellen	Episode: "The Big Brain"; credited as Ellen McRae	
1964	Suspense Theater	Barbara / Lucille	Episode: "The Deep End"; credited as Ellen McRae	
1964	Bob Hope Presents the Chrysler Theatre	Eva Laurelton	Episode: "Runaway"; credited as Ellen McRae	
1964	The Greatest Show on Earth	Susan Mason	Episode: "Big Man from Nairobi"; credited as Ellen McRae	
1964	Death Valley Days	Jenny	Episode: "Hastings Cut-off"; credited as Ellen McRae	
1964–65	The Doctors	Dr. Kate Bartok	Multiple episodes; credited as Ellen McRae	
1965	For the People	Maria Haviland	Episode: "Seized, Confined and Detained"; credited as Ellen McRae	
1966	The Time Tunnel	Dr. Eve Holland	Episode: "Crack of Doom"; credited as Ellen McRae	
1967–68	Iron Horse	Julie Parsons	9 episodes; credited as Ellen McRae	
1967	The Big Valley	Sister Jacob	Episode: "Days of Grace"; credited as Ellen McRae	
1968	Insight	Janet	Episode: "All the Things I've Never Liked"; credited as Ellen McRae	
1969	The Virginian	Kate Bürden	Episode: "Last Grave at Socorro Creek"	
1972	The Bold Ones: The Lawyers	Rachel Lambert	Episode: "Lisa, I Hardly Knew You"	
1974	Thursday's Game	Lynne Evers	Television movie	
1981	The People vs. Jean Harris	Jean Harris	Television movie	
1985	Into Thin Air	Joan Walker	Television movie	
1985	Surviving: A Family in Crisis	Tina Brogan	Television movie	
1986	Act of Vengeance	Margaret Yablonski	Television movie	
1986	Something in Common	Lynn Hollander	Television movie	
1986–87	The Ellen Burstyn Show	Ellen Brewer	13 episodes	
1987	Look Away	Mary Todd Lincoln	Television movie	
1987	Pack of Lies	Barbara Jackson	Television movie	
1990	When You Remember Me	Nurse Cooder	Television movie	
1991	Mrs. Lambert Remembers Love	Lillian "Lil" Lambert	Television movie	
1992	Taking Back My Life	Wilma	Television movie	
1993	Shattered Trust: The Shari Karney Story	Joan Delvecchio	Television movie	
1994	Trick of the Eye	Frances Griffin	Television movie	
1994	Getting Gotti	Jo Giaclone	Television movie	
1994	Getting Out	Arlie's Mother	Television movie	
1995	Follow the River	Gretel	Television movie	
1995	My Brother's Keeper	Helen	Television movie	
1996	Timepiece	Maud Gannon	Television movie	
1996	Our Son, the Matchmaker	Iva Mae Longwell	Television movie	
1997	Flash	Laura Strong	Television movie	
1997	A Deadly Vision	Yvette Watson	Television movie	
1998	A Will of Their Own	Veronica Steward	Mini-series	
1998	The Patron Saint of Liars	June Clatterbuck	Television movie	
1999	Night Ride Home	Maggie	Television movie	
2000	Mermaid	Trish Gill	Television movie	
2000–02	That's Life	Dolly DeLucca	34 episodes	
2001	Dodson's Journey	Mother	Television movie	
2001	Within These Walls	Joan Thomas	Television movie	
2003	Brush with Fate	Rika	Television movie	
2004	The Five People You Meet in Heaven	Ruby	Television movie	
2004	The Madam's Family: The Truth About the Canal Street Brothel	Tommie	Television movie	
2005	Our Fathers	Mary Ryan	Television movie	
2005	Mrs. Harris	Ex-lover No. 3 / Former Tarnower "Steady"	Television movie	
2006	The Book of Daniel	Bishop Beatrice Congreve	8 episodes	
2007	For One More Day	Pauline Benetto	Television movie	
2007–11	Big Love	Nancy Davis Dutton	6 episodes	
2008	Law & Order: Special Victims Unit	Bernie Stabler	Episode: "Swing"	
2012	Political Animals	Margaret Barrish	6 episodes	
2012	Coma	Mrs. Emerson	2 episodes	
2014	Flowers in the Attic	Olivia Foxworth	Television movie	
2014	Petals on the Wind	Olivia Foxworth	Television movie	
2014	Louie	Evanka	5 episodes: "Elevator" Parts 1, 2, 3, 5, 6	
2015	Mom	Shirley Stabler	Episode: "Terrorists and Gingerbread"	
2016	House of Cards	Elizabeth Hale	5 episodes	
2021–present	Law & Order: Organized Crime	Bernie Stabler	Recurring role	
2022	The First Lady	Sara Roosevelt	6 episodes	

== Theater ==
Year	Title	Role	Venue	Ref.
1958	Fair Game	Susan Hammarlee	Longacre Theatre, Broadway	
1975	Same Time, Next Year	Doris	Brooks Atkinson Theatre, Broadway	
1983	84 Charing Cross Road	Helen Haniff	Nederlander Theatre, Broadway	
1989	Shirley Valentine	Shirley Valentine	Booth Theatre, Broadway	
1992	Shimada	Sharyn Beaumont	Broadhurst Theatre, Broadway	
1995	Sacrilege	Sister Grace	Belasco Theatre, Broadway	
2003	Oldest Living Confederate Widow Tells All	Lucy Marsden	Longacre Theatre, Broadway	
2013	Picnic	Mrs. Helen Potts	American Airlines Theatre, Broadway	
2017	As You Like It	Jacques	Classic Stage Company, Off-Broadway	
2019	33 Variations	Dr. Katherine Brandt	Comedy Theatre, Melbourne	
