= List of awards and nominations received by Ellen Burstyn =

Ellen Burstyn awards and nominations
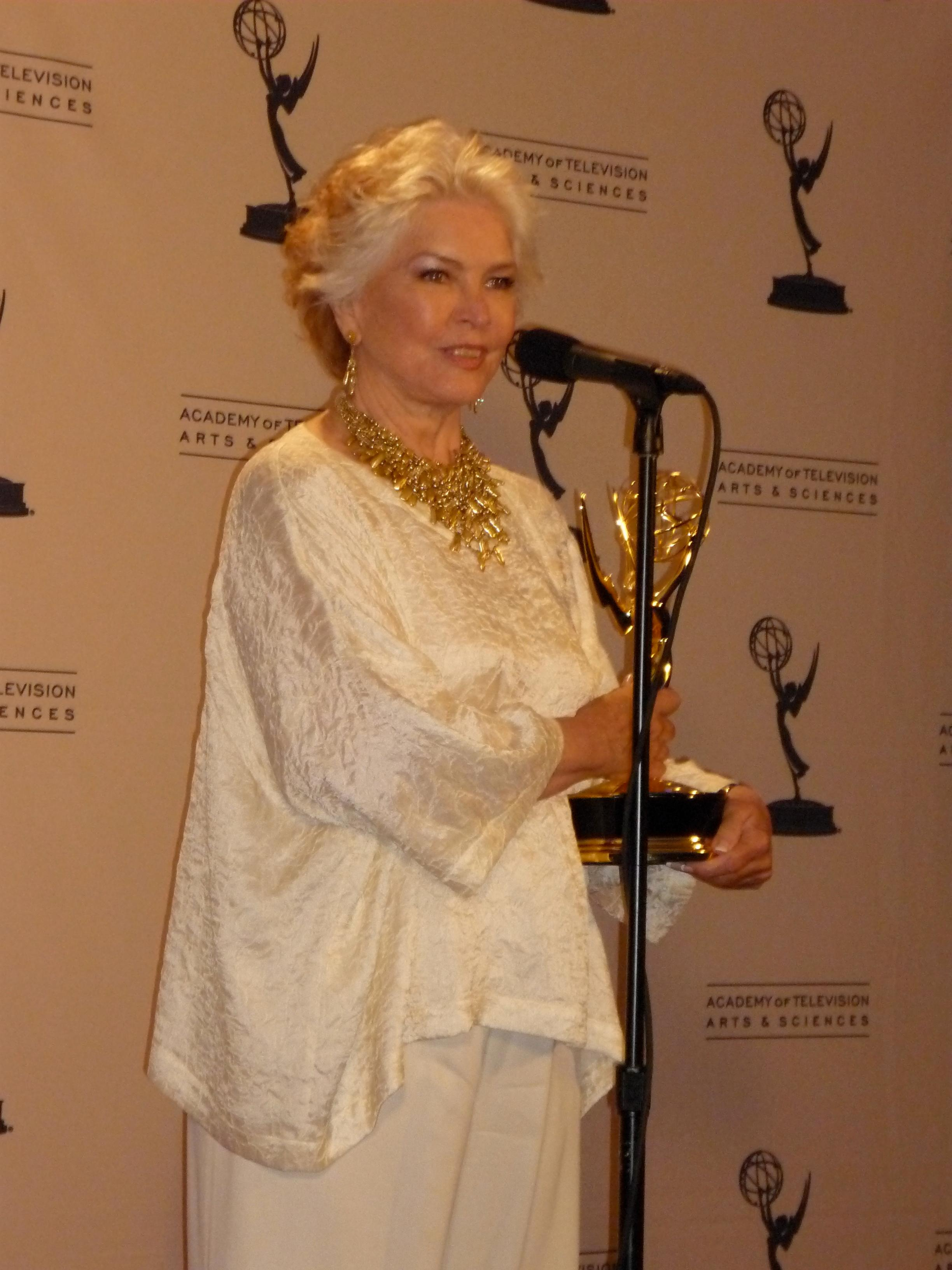
- Burstyn in 2009
Awards and nominations
Award	Wins	Nominations
Academy Awards	1	6
British Academy Film Awards	1	1
Daytime Emmy Awards	0	1
Golden Globe Awards	1	7
Grammy Awards	0	1
Primetime Emmy Awards	2	8
Screen Actors Guild Awards	0	4
Tony Awards	1	1

Totals (Note: Certain award groups do not simply award one winner. They acknowledge several different recipients, have runners-up, and have third place. Since this is a specific recognition and is different from losing an award, runner-up mentions are considered wins in this award tally. For simplification and to avoid errors, each award in this list has been presumed to have had a prior nomination.)
- Wins: 67
- Nominations: 203

This article is a list of awards and nominations received by Ellen Burstyn.

Ellen Burstyn is an American actress known for her roles on stage and screen. She has received various accolades including an Academy Award, a British Academy Film Award, a Golden Globe Award, two Primetime Emmy Awards, and a Tony Award as well as nominations for five Critics' Choice Awards, a Daytime Emmy Award, a Grammy Award, and four Screen Actors Guild Awards.

Burstyn has won the Triple Crown of Acting: an Emmy Award, Academy Award, and Tony Award. She has received six Oscar nominations, winning Best Actress for Martin Scorsese's drama Alice Doesn't Live Here Anymore (1974). Her other nominations were Peter Bogdanovich's coming-of-age drama The Last Picture Show (1971), William Friedkin's horror film The Exorcist (1973), Same Time, Next Year (1978), Resurrection (1980), and Darren Aronofsky's psychological drama Requiem for a Dream (2000). She also received the British Academy Film Award for Best Actress for Alice Doesn't Live Here Anymore. She has been nominated for seven Golden Globe Awards, winning Best Actress in a Motion Picture - Musical or Comedy for Same Time, Next Year.

For her work in television she has received eight Primetime Emmy Awards nominations, winning twice for Outstanding Guest Actress in a Drama Series for Law & Order: Special Victims Unit in 2009 and Outstanding Supporting Actress in a Limited or Anthology Series or Movie for Political Animals in 2013. For her work on the Broadway stage she received the Tony Award for Best Actress in a Play for Same Time, Next Year in 1975. She also received a nomination for the Grammy Award for Best Spoken Word Album in 1996.

== Major associations ==
=== Academy Awards ===
Year	Category	Nominated work	Result	Ref.
1972	Best Supporting Actress	The Last Picture Show	Nominated	
1974	Best Actress	The Exorcist	Nominated	
1975	Best Actress	Alice Doesn't Live Here Anymore	Won	
1979	Best Actress	Same Time, Next Year	Nominated	
1981	Best Actress	Resurrection	Nominated	
2001	Best Actress	Requiem for a Dream	Nominated	

=== BAFTA Awards ===
Year	Category	Nominated work	Result	Ref.
British Academy Film Awards
1976	Best Actress in a Leading Role	Alice Doesn't Live Here Anymore	Won	

=== Critics' Choice Awards ===
Year	Category	Nominated work	Result	Ref.
Critics' Choice Television Awards
2012	Best Movie/Mini-Series Supporting Actress	Political Animals	Nominated	
2014	Best Movie/Mini-Series Supporting Actress	Flowers in the Attic	Nominated	
2016	Best Guest Performer - Drama Series	House of Cards	Nominated	
2016	Best Guest Performer - Comedy Series	Mom	Nominated	
Critics' Choice Movie Awards
2020	Best Supporting Actress	Pieces of a Woman	Nominated	

=== Emmy Awards ===
Year	Category	Nominated work	Result	Ref.
Primetime Emmy Awards
1981	Outstanding Lead Actress in a Limited Series or Movie	The People vs. Jean Harris	Nominated	
1988	Outstanding Lead Actress in a Limited Series or Movie	Pack of Lies	Nominated	
2006	Outstanding Supporting Actress in a Miniseries or a Movie	Mrs. Harris	Nominated	
2008	Outstanding Guest Actress in a Drama Series	Big Love (for "Take Me as I Am")	Nominated	
2009	Outstanding Guest Actress in a Drama Series	Law & Order: Special Victims Unit (for "Swing")	Won	
2013	Outstanding Supporting Actress in a Miniseries or a Movie	Political Animals	Won	
2014	Outstanding Supporting Actress in a Miniseries or a Movie	Flowers in the Attic	Nominated	
2016	Outstanding Guest Actress in a Drama Series	House of Cards (Season 4)	Nominated	
Daytime Emmy Awards
2001	Outstanding Performer in Children's Programming	Mermaid	Nominated	

=== Golden Globe Awards ===
Year	Category	Nominated work	Result	Ref.
1972	Best Supporting Actress – Motion Picture	The Last Picture Show	Nominated	
1974	Best Actress in a Motion Picture - Drama	The Exorcist	Nominated	
1975	Best Actress in a Motion Picture - Drama	Alice Doesn't Live Here Anymore	Nominated	
1979	Best Actress in a Motion Picture - Musical or Comedy	Same Time, Next Year	Won	
1981	Best Actress in a Motion Picture - Drama	Resurrection	Nominated	
1982	Best Actress – Miniseries or TV Film	The People vs. Jean Harris	Nominated	
2001	Best Actress in a Motion Picture - Drama	Requiem for a Dream	Nominated	

=== Grammy Awards ===
Year	Category	Nominated work	Result	Ref.
1996	Best Spoken Word Album	Grow Old Along With Me The Best Is Yet To Be	Nominated	

=== Screen Actors Guild Award ===
Year	Category	Nominated work	Result	Ref.
1996	Outstanding Cast in a Motion Picture	How to Make an American Quilt	Nominated	
2001	Outstanding Actress in a Leading Role	Requiem for a Dream	Nominated	
2008	Outstanding Actress in a Miniseries or Television Movie	Mitch Albom's For One More Day	Nominated	
2014	Outstanding Actress in a Miniseries or Television Movie	Flowers in the Attic	Nominated	

=== Tony Award ===
Year	Category	Nominated work	Result	Ref.
1975	Best Actress in a Play	Same Time, Next Year	Won	

== Critics Awards ==
Association	Year	Category	Nominated work	Result	Ref.
Alliance of Women Film Journalists	2021	Best Supporting Actress	Pieces of a Woman	Nominated	
Alliance of Women Film Journalists	2021	Actress Defying Age and Ageism	Pieces of a Woman	Nominated	
Boston Society of Film Critics	2000	Best Actress	Requiem for a Dream	Won	
Chicago Film Critics Association	2000	Best Actress	Requiem for a Dream	Won	
Chlotrudis Society for Independent Film	2001	Best Actress	Requiem For A Dream	Nominated	
Drama Desk Awards	1975	Outstanding Actress in a Play	Same Time, Next Year	Won	
Dallas–Fort Worth Film Critics Association	2001	Best Actress	Requiem For A Dream	Nominated	
Denver Film Critics Society	2021	Best Supporting Actress	Pieces Of A Woman	Won	
DiscussingFilm Critics Awards	2021	Best Supporting Actress	Pieces Of A Woman	Nominated	
Florida Film Critics Circle	2000	Best Actress	Requiem for a Dream	Won	
Greater Western New York Film Critics	2020	Best Supporting Actress	Pieces of a Woman	Nominated	
Houston Film Critics Society	2020	Best Supporting Actress	Pieces of a Woman	Nominated	
London Film Critics Circle	2020	Supporting Actress of the Year	Pieces of a Woman	Nominated	
National Society of Film Critics	1971	Best Supporting Actress	The Last Picture Show	Won	
New York Film Critics Circle	1971	Best Supporting Actress	The Last Picture Show	Won	
New York Film Critics Circle	2000	Best Supporting Actress	Requiem for a Dream	Runner-up	
New York Film Critics Online	2020	Best Supporting Actress	Pieces of a Woman	Won	
Online Film Critics Society	2000	Best Actress	Requiem for a Dream	Won	
San Diego Film Critics Society	2020	Best Supporting Actress	Pieces of a Woman	Nominated	
St. Louis Film Critics Association	2020	Best Supporting Actress	Pieces of a Woman	Nominated	
Toronto Film Critics Association	2000	Best Supporting Actress	Requiem for a Dream	Nominated	
Vancouver Film Critics Circle	2008	Best Actress in a Canadian Film	The Stone Angel	Nominated	

== Miscellaneous Awards ==
Association	Year	Category	Nominated work	Result	Ref.
AARP Movies for Grownups Awards	2003	Best Grownup Love Story	Divine Secrets of the Ya-Ya Sisterhood	Nominated	
AARP Movies for Grownups Awards	2008	Best Actress	Lovely, Still	Nominated	
AARP Movies for Grownups Awards	2011	Best Supporting Actress	Another Happy Day	Nominated	
Awards Circuit Community Awards	2000	Best Actress	Requiem for a Dream	Won	
Awards Circuit Community Awards	2012	Best Supporting Actress (TV Movie or Mini-Series)	Coma	Nominated	
Behind the Voice Actors Awards	2014	Best Vocal Ensemble in an Anime Feature Film/Special	Omoide no Mânî	Nominated	
Berlin International Film Festival	1988	Berlinale Camera	—N/a	Honored	
Boston Film Festival	2000	Film Excellence Award	—N/a	Honored	
CinEuphoria Awards	2020	Career - Honorary Award	—N/a	Honored	
Canadian Screen Awards	1982	Best Foreign Actress	Silence of the North	Nominated	
Canadian Screen Awards	2008	Best Actress	The Stone Angel	Won	
Fangoria Chainsaw Awards	2001	Best Actress	Requiem For A Dream	Won	
Independent Spirit Awards	2001	Best Female Lead	Requiem For A Dream	Won	
Saturn Awards	1981	Best Actress	Resurrection	Nominated	
Saturn Awards	2001	Best Actress	Requiem for a Dream	Nominated	
Saturn Awards	2021	Best Supporting Actress in a Film	Lucy in the Sky	Nominated	
Satellite Award	2000	Best Actress - Motion Picture	Requiem for a Dream	Won	
Satellite Award	2008	Best Actress – Mini-Series or Television Film	For One More Day	Nominated	
Venice Film Festival	2026	Golden Lion for Lifetime Achievement	—N/a	Honored	
