= Ellen Burstyn =

American actress (born 1932)

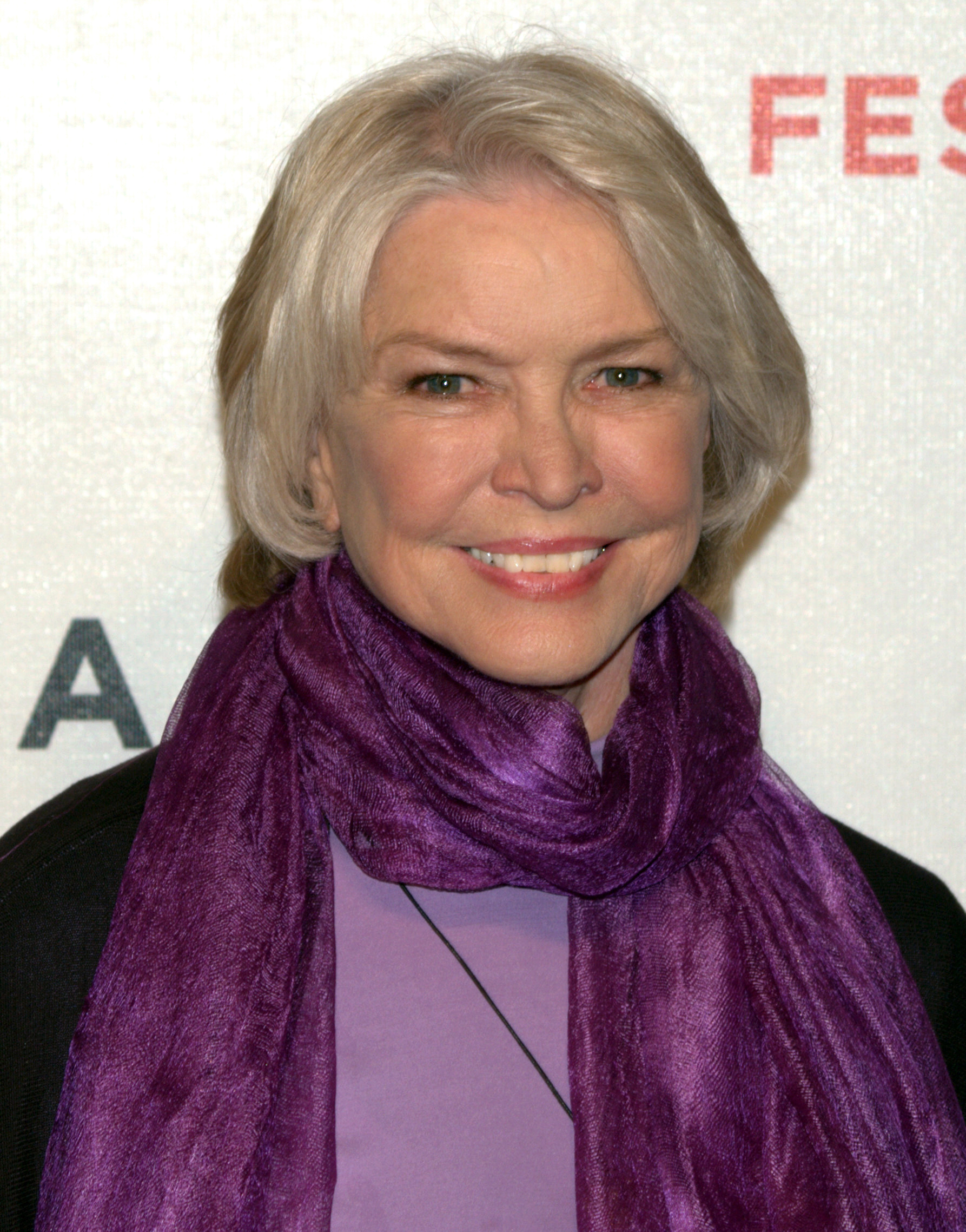
- Burstyn on May 1, 2009
- Born: Edna Rae Gillooly; December 7, 1932 (age 93); Detroit, Michigan, U.S.
- Other name: Ellen McRae
- Occupation: Actress
- Years active: 1955–present
- Works: Full list
- Spouses: William Alexander (m. 1950; div. 1957) Paul Roberts (m. 1958; div. 1961) Neil Burstyn (m. 1964; div. 1972)
- Children: 1
- Awards: Full list

10th President of the Actors' Equity Association
- In office 1982–1985
- Preceded by: Theodore Bikel
- Succeeded by: Colleen Dewhurst

Ellen Burstyn (born Edna Rae Gillooly; December 7, 1932) is an American actress. Known for her portrayals of complex women in dramas, she is the recipient of numerous accolades, including an Academy Award, a Tony Award, and two Primetime Emmy Awards. Burstyn is one of the few performers to achieve the "Triple Crown of Acting". She has also received a BAFTA Award and a Golden Globe Award.

Burstyn made her acting debut on Broadway in Fair Game in 1957 before winning the Tony Award for Best Actress in a Play for Same Time, Next Year (1975). She earned the Academy Award for Best Actress for her role as the widow Alice Hyatt in Martin Scorsese's romantic drama Alice Doesn't Live Here Anymore (1974). Her other Oscar-nominated roles were in The Last Picture Show (1971), The Exorcist (1973), Same Time, Next Year (1978), Resurrection (1980), and Requiem for a Dream (2000). Her other notable films include Harry and Tonto (1974), How to Make an American Quilt (1995), Divine Secrets of the Ya-Ya Sisterhood (2002), W. (2008), Interstellar (2014), The Age of Adaline (2015), and Pieces of a Woman (2020).

She won Primetime Emmy Awards for her guest role in the NBC crime drama Law & Order: Special Victims Unit (2009), and for her supporting role in the USA Network political miniseries Political Animals (2013). Her other Emmy-nominated roles include Pack of Lies (1988), Mrs. Harris (2005), Big Love (2008), Flowers in the Attic (2014), and House of Cards (2016). Since 2000, she has been co-president of the Actors Studio, a drama school in New York City. In 2013, she was inducted into the American Theatre Hall of Fame for her work onstage.

== Early life ==
Burstyn was born Edna Rae Gillooly on December 7, 1932, in Detroit, the daughter of Correine Marie (née Hamel) and John Austin Gillooly. She says her ancestry is "Irish, French, Pennsylvania Dutch, a little Canadian Indian". Burstyn has an older brother, Jack, and a younger brother, Steve. Her parents divorced when she was young, and she and her brothers lived with their mother and abusive stepfather.

Burstyn attended Cass Technical High School, a university-preparatory school that allowed students to choose a specific field of study. Burstyn majored in fashion illustration. In high school she was a cheerleader, a member of the student council, and president of her drama club. She dropped out of high school during her senior year after failing her classes. Soon afterward, Burstyn worked as a dancer using the name Kerri Flynn, and then as a model until the age of 23. She later moved to Dallas, where she continued modeling and worked in other fashion jobs before moving to New York City.

From 1955 to 1956, Burstyn appeared as an "away we go" dancing girl on The Jackie Gleason Show under the name Erica Dean. Burstyn then decided to become an actress and chose the name "Ellen McRae" as her professional name; she later changed her surname after her 1964 marriage to Neil Burstyn.

== Career ==
=== 1958–1970: Early work and Broadway debut ===
Burstyn debuted on Broadway in 1957 and joined Lee Strasberg's The Actors Studio in New York City in 1967. Starting in the late 1950s, and throughout the 1960s, Burstyn frequently played guest roles on a number of primetime television shows, including Dr. Kildare, 77 Sunset Strip, Ben Casey, Perry Mason, Cheyenne, Wagon Train, Gunsmoke, The Big Valley, The Virginian, Laramie and The Time Tunnel. Burstyn was credited as Ellen McRae until 1967, when she and her then-husband Neil Nephew both changed their surname to Burstyn, and she began to be credited as Ellen Burstyn. In 1970, she appeared uncredited in the Joseph Strick adaptation of Henry Miller's controversial novel Tropic of Cancer. In 1975, she won a Tony Award for Best Performance by a Leading Actress in a Play for her performance in the comedy Same Time, Next Year, a role she reprised in a film adaptation in 1978.

=== 1971–1979: Breakthrough, acclaim and awards success ===
After many small film roles, Burstyn gained recognition after starring in The Last Picture Show (1971), a coming-of-age story, directed by Peter Bogdanovich and adapted from a semi-autobiographical 1966 novel by Larry McMurtry. The film received critical acclaim for its nostalgia and visual style that is reminiscent of 1951, the year in which the plot takes place. The film was nominated for eight Academy Awards, including Best Supporting Actress for Burstyn and her co-star Cloris Leachman, with the latter winning the award. In 1998, the film was selected for preservation in the United States National Film Registry, being deemed "culturally, historically, or aesthetically significant". Next she appeared in the drama The King of Marvin Gardens in 1972, with Jack Nicholson, Bruce Dern, and Scatman Crothers. A story about a daydreamer who convinces his brother to help fund a get-rich-quick scheme, the film was well received by critics.

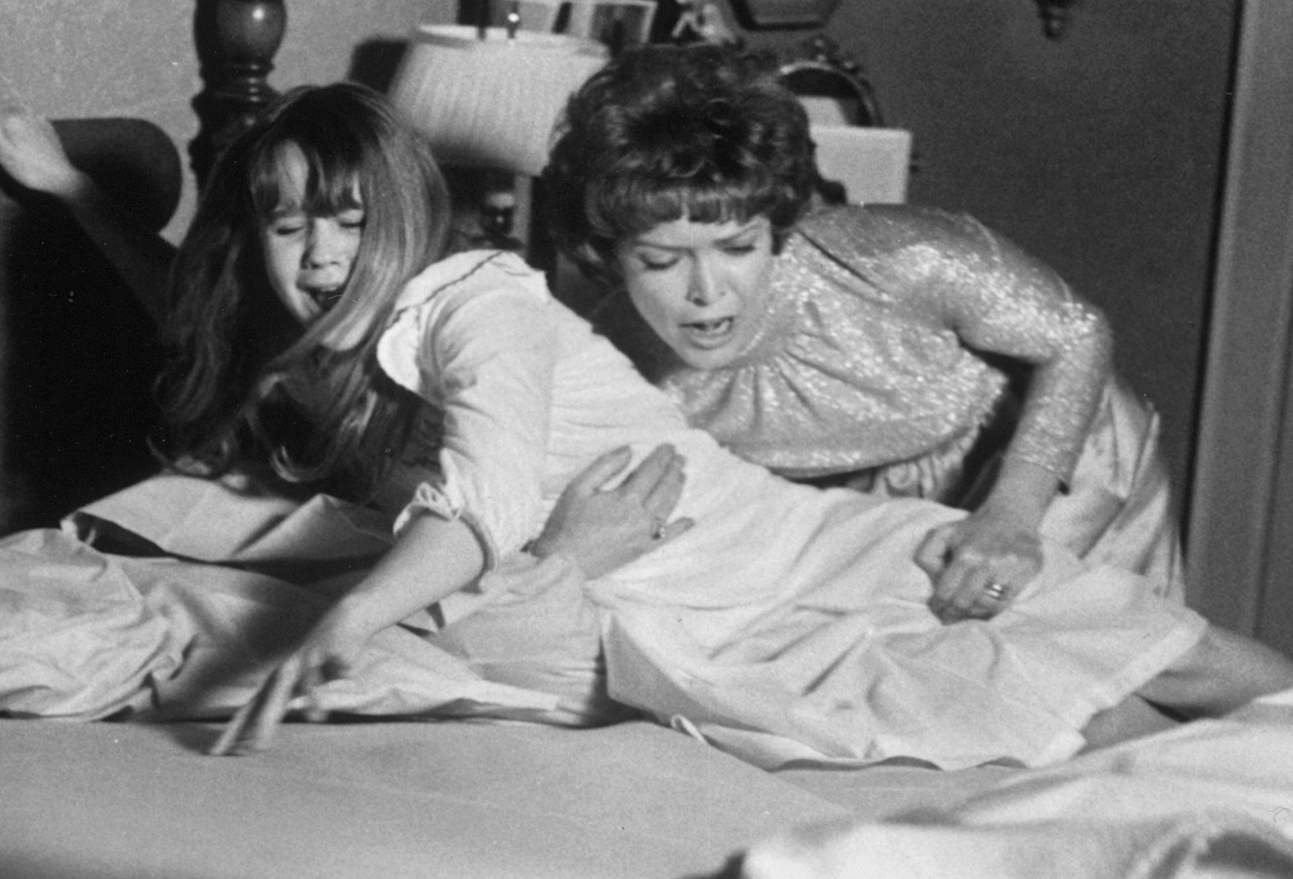
Burstyn and Blair in The Exorcist (1973)

In 1972, Burstyn sought the lead role of Chris MacNeil in the supernatural horror film The Exorcist (1973). The film studio was initially reluctant to cast her, but when no other actors were put forward, Burstyn was chosen for the part. Her co-stars were Max von Sydow, Lee J. Cobb, Kitty Winn, Jack MacGowran, Jason Miller, and Linda Blair. The Exorcist had a production budget of $12 million, and its principal photography was held in various parts of New York City. Filming proved to be challenging for the entire cast; it took "six-day weeks, twelve-hour days for nine months" to film, and director William Friedkin used a prop gun to get genuine reactions from the cast. Burstyn also injured her coccyx, which led to permanent injury to her spine. Film critic Roger Ebert praised Burstyn for her ability to capture MacNeil's "frustration" when her daughter is possessed by an evil spirit. Against expectations, The Exorcist was a major commercial success at the box-office. Adjusted for inflation, the film is the ninth highest-grossing film of all time in the U.S. and Canada and the top-grossing R-rated film of all time. It won two Academy Awards – Best Adapted Screenplay and Best Sound Mixing, and earned Burstyn her first nomination for the Academy Award for Best Actress.

Burstyn followed up with a small role in the comedy-drama Harry and Tonto (1974). Her next major role was in Martin Scorsese's romantic drama Alice Doesn't Live Here Anymore (1974) where she played a widowed woman, raising a son and yearning to start a new life for herself as a singer. She was drawn to the script because of the character's resemblance to her own life. Burstyn was also inspired by the works of Betty Friedan and Gloria Steinem, who found that women were searching to "redefine their roles in society". Burstyn was offered to direct but turned it down to concentrate on her performance, but selected then-newcomer Scorsese as director and recalled the collaboration as "one of the best experiences I've ever had". Vincent Canby of The New York Times wrote, "Burstyn never misses the eccentric beat that distinguishes it—that makes Alice such a hugely appealing character who is both banal and very rare". Her performance in the film earned her the Academy Award for Best Actress. In 1975, she became a graduate of the first group of participants in the American Film Institute Directing Workshop for Women. In 1977, she served as a member of the jury at the 27th Berlin International Film Festival.

Burstyn played supporting roles in Providence (1977) and A Dream of Passion (1978). Although the films were independent dramas and not widely seen, the latter was nominated for the Golden Globe Award for Best Foreign Language Film. Also in 1978, Burstyn starred in Same Time, Next Year opposite Alan Alda, a romantic-comedy about two people, married to others, who meet for a romantic tryst once a year for two decades. The film is based on a 1975 play of the same title by Bernard Slade. Upon its release on November 22, the film garnered mixed reviews, with Janet Maslin of The New York Times stating, "Slade's screenplay isn't often funny, and it's full of momentous events that can't be laughed away", but praises Burstyn for giving the role "warmth and grace". Same Time, Next Year received four Academy Award nominations, including a third Best actress nomination for Burstyn. At the annual Golden Globe Awards, Burstyn won Best Actress – Motion Picture Comedy or Musical, while the film received two other nominations—Best Actor – Motion Picture Musical or Comedy for Alda and Best Original Song.

=== 1980–1998: Established actress ===
Burstyn hosted NBC's Saturday Night Live, a popular late-night sketch comedy and variety show, in December 1980. That year, Burstyn starred in the drama Resurrection, a story about a woman who discovers her sudden power for healing after surviving an automobile crash. Her performance in the film earned her a fourth nomination for the Academy Award for Best Actress and a third nomination for the Golden Globe Award for Best Actress – Motion Picture Drama. In 1981, she starred in the biographical television film The People vs. Jean Harris (1981), based on the real life murder of Herman Tarnower, a well-known cardiologist and author of the best-selling book The Complete Scarsdale Medical Diet. Burstyn's portrayal of the murderer, Jean Harris, earned her nominations for the Primetime Emmy Award for Outstanding Lead Actress in a Limited or Anthology Series or Movie and the Golden Globe Award for Best Actress – Miniseries or Television Film. In 1981, Burstyn recorded "The Ballad of the Nazi Soldier's Wife" for Ben Bagley's album Kurt Weill Revisited, Vol. 2.

In the mid-1980s, Burstyn starred in several television films, including Surviving (1985), Into Thin Air (1985), Act of Vengeance (1986), Something in Common (1986) and a 1987 adaptation of the play Pack of Lies, which was nominated for three Primetime Emmy Awards, including another for Burstyn as Outstanding Actress in a Mini-Series or Movie. She also appeared in theatrical films, including The Ambassador (1984) and Twice in a Lifetime (1985). In Twice in a Lifetime, co-starring Gene Hackman and Ann-Margret, she portrayed Kate, the wife whom Hackman's character divorces when he falls in love with another woman.

In 1986, Burstyn starred in an ABC television sitcom, The Ellen Burstyn Show, with co-stars Megan Mullally as her daughter and Elaine Stritch as her mother. Created by David Frankel it ran only for one season. In 1987, she appeared in Hanna's War (1987), and the television movies Dear America: Letters Home from Vietnam and Look Away. In 1988, she then participated again as a member of the jury for the 38th Berlin International Film Festival.

In 1990, Burstyn won the Sarah Siddons Award for her work in Chicago theatre. A variety of acting performances followed suit, including in the dramas When You Remember Me (1990), Dying Young (1991) and Grand Isle (1991). In addition to television movies, Burstyn appeared in When a Man Loves a Woman (1994) with co-stars Andy Garcia and Meg Ryan.

In 1995, Burstyn portrayed Judith in the comedy-drama Roommates (1995). The film received negative reviews and emerged as a commercial failure at the box-office, but received a nomination for the Academy Award for Best Makeup and Hairstyling. Also that year, Burstyn appeared in How to Make an American Quilt (1995), based on the 1991 novel of the same name by Whitney Otto, which tells the stories of several generations of women who are part of the same quilting circle. Despite a mixed critical response, the cast received a nomination for the Screen Actors Guild Award for Outstanding Performance by a Cast in a Motion Picture.

In 1998, Burstyn appeared in Playing by Heart, with co-stars including Sean Connery and Angelina Jolie, a story of eleven ordinary people in Los Angeles who are connected in different ways. Some critics such as Roger Ebert viewed the film positively despite its lackluster performance at the box office. Burstyn next found supporting roles in The Spitfire Grill (1996), about a woman starting a new life after being released from prison, and Deceiver (1997), a murder crime drama. Although not box office hits, each film garnered mixed to positive responses, according to film review aggregator Rotten Tomatoes. Next, she appeared in James Gray's The Yards (2000) alongside a principal cast of Mark Wahlberg, Joaquin Phoenix, Charlize Theron, Faye Dunaway and James Caan. The crime drama was unpopular and a commercial failure, earning less than $1 million worldwide from a budget of $24 million.

=== 1999–2009: Dramas and television work ===
In 1999, director Darren Aronofsky offered Burstyn the role of Sara Goldfarb in the psychological drama Requiem for a Dream (2000). She initially rejected the part, objecting to the depressive nature of the story; however, she changed her mind after seeing Aronofsky's previous work. The film is based on the novel of the same name by Hubert Selby Jr, which tells the story of four New Yorkers whose lives are affected by drug addictions. To prepare for the role, Burstyn had to research troubled women in Brooklyn, "to get their speech patterns and outlook on life—and how narrow that is [...] their life is about getting enough money to put food on the table to feed their children, and that's it". She had to wear fat suits and lose about 10-pounds (4½ kg) to showcase her character's weight-loss. Burstyn and her co-stars Jennifer Connelly, Jared Leto, and Marlon Wayans, found the filming schedule of forty days challenging and intense. Requiem for a Dream premiered at the 2000 Cannes Film Festival and was released to theaters on October 6, 2000. The film was well received and praised for its visual style and depiction of drug abuse. Peter Travers of Rolling Stone writes, "Burstyn gives an award-caliber performance that is as raw and riveting as the movie that contains it". Burstyn's performance earned her a fifth nomination for the Academy Award for Best Actress.

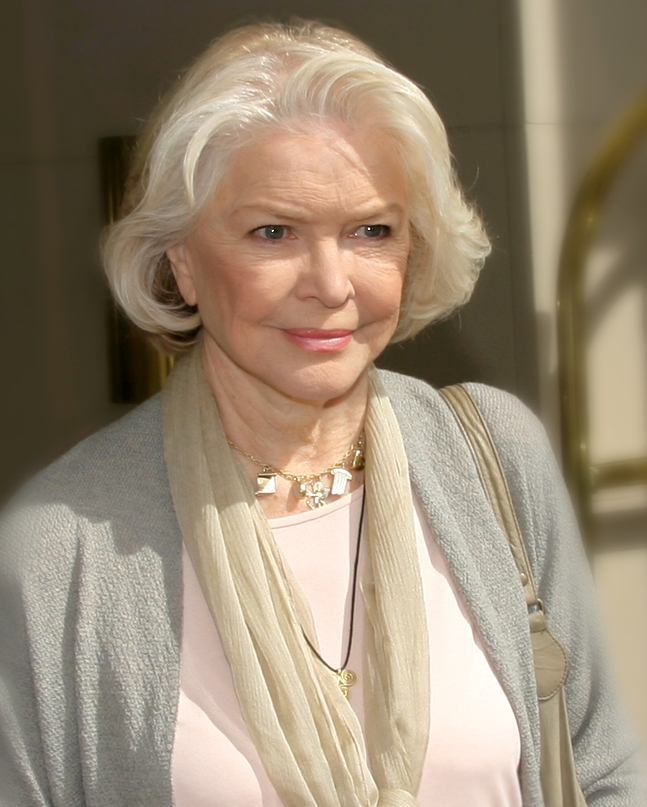
Burstyn at the 2007 Toronto International Film Festival

From 2000 to 2002, Burstyn starred in the CBS television series That's Life. The series, set in suburban New Jersey, ran for two seasons. Burstyn appeared in several more films, including Divine Secrets of the Ya-Ya Sisterhood (2002), Brush with Fate (2003) and The Five People You Meet in Heaven (2004). Burstyn starred in the Broadway production of Martin Tahse's Oldest Living Confederate Widow Tells All, based upon the novel of the same title by Allan Gurganus. The show played 19 previews and officially opened November 17, 2003. Due to unfavorable reviews, all performances after the opening night were cancelled.

She provided a supporting role as the mother of two sons in the 2006 romantic drama The Elephant King. The film originally premiered at the 2006 Tribeca Film Festival, and opened in U.S. theaters October 2008. In January 2006, she starred as an Episcopal bishop in the NBC comedy-drama series The Book of Daniel. The series, which also starred Aidan Quinn as a drug-addicted Episcopal priest married to an alcoholic wife, was met with controversy from religious and spiritual leaders due to its unconventional portrayals of religious figures. Conservative groups including American Family Association and Focus on the Family urged supporters to complain to NBC affiliates that carried the show. NBC removed the series from its line-up after four episodes, but did not publicly provide a reason.

In 2006, Burstyn appeared in the epic drama The Fountain, her second collaboration with Darren Aronofsky. Portraying Dr. Lillian Guzetti, the film is about a scientist (played by Hugh Jackman) struggling with mortality and is seeking a medical breakthrough to save his wife (Rachel Weisz) from cancer. Budgeted at $35 million, the screenplay is a blend of fantasy, history, spirituality, and science fiction. The Fountain premiered on November 22, 2006, to mixed reviews and under-performed at the box office. Ruthe Stein of the San Francisco Chronicle writes, "The movie is overloaded with imagery. At times, it's stunning to look at, but gradually becomes too much", but praises Burstyn for her character's "impressive depth". Since its release, the film managed to gain a cult following causing media to revisit the film.

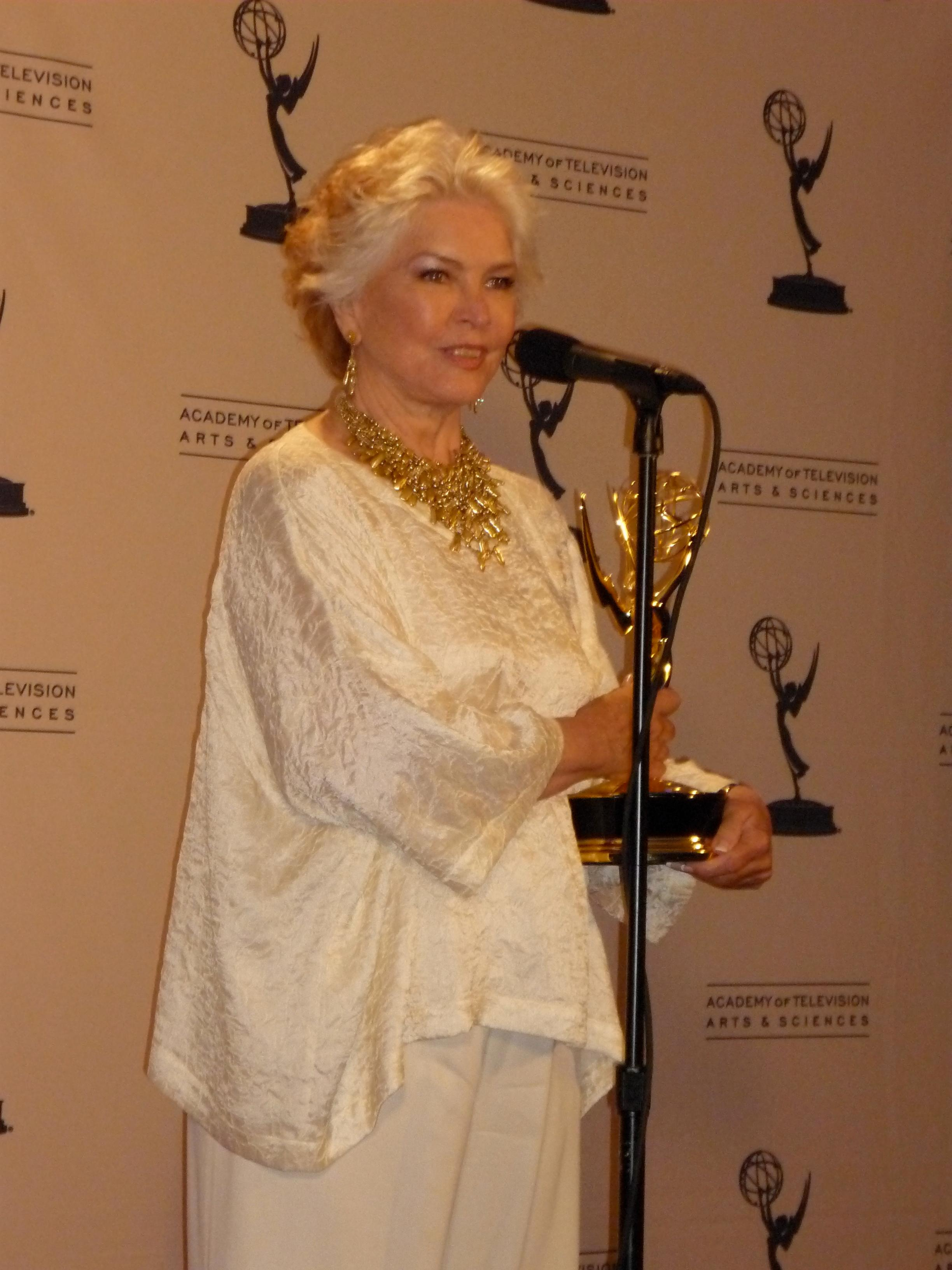
Burstyn at the 2009 Creative Arts Emmy Awards

In 2006, Burstyn was nominated for the Primetime Emmy Award for Outstanding Supporting Actress in a Limited or Anthology Series or Movie for the role of Former Tarnower Steady in HBO's Mrs. Harris, another biopic about Jean Harris. Soon after the nominations were announced, questions were raised regarding the worthiness of the nomination due to her minor role in the film, consisting of 14 seconds of screen time and 38 words of dialogue. The nominating committee were accused of approving a "familiar" name without actually seeing their performance. The Academy of Television Arts and Sciences, administrator of the Emmy Awards, insisted it was a legitimate nomination. Burstyn reacted, "I thought it was fabulous. My next ambition is to get nominated for seven seconds, and ultimately, I want to be nominated for a picture in which I don't even appear", adding, "This doesn't have anything to do with me... work it out yourself". Ultimately, Kelly Macdonald, who starred in The Girl in the Cafe, won the award. In March 2007, the academy adjusted the eligibility criteria.

Burstyn also appeared in the thriller The Wicker Man (2006), a remake of the 1973 British film of the same name, which was a commercial flop and negatively received by critics. Slant magazine was critical of the cast performances, writing that Burstyn "feigns arrogant malevolence". A year later, Burstyn starred in The Stone Angel, based on the 1964 novel of the same name by Margaret Laurence. Like its predecessor, the film also garnered negative reviews, with Stephen Holden of The New York Times writing, "a film of tightly assembled bits and pieces that don't fit comfortably together despite clever dashes of magical realism connecting past and present... it leaves you frustrated by its failure to braid subplots and characters into a gripping narrative". Burstyn followed up with parts in Lovely, Still (2008) and The Loss of a Teardrop Diamond (2008).

In addition to film roles, between 2007 and 2011, Burstyn had an occasional recurring role on the HBO television drama series Big Love, playing the mother of polygamist wife Barbara Henrickson. Burstyn returned to the stage in March 2008, in the off-Broadway production of Stephen Adly Guirgis's The Little Flower of East Orange, directed by Philip Seymour Hoffman in a co-production by LAByrinth Theater Company and The Public Theater. In addition to her stage work, Burstyn portrayed former First Lady Barbara Bush in Oliver Stone's biographical film W. in 2008.

In 2009, Burstyn won the Primetime Emmy Award for Outstanding Guest Actress in a Drama Series for her portrayal of the bipolar estranged mother of Detective Elliot Stabler on NBC's Law & Order: Special Victims Unit.

=== 2010–present ===
Throughout the early 2010s, Burstyn starred in various independent films such as Main Street (2010), Another Happy Day (2011), and The Mighty Macs (2011). In 2012, she joined the cast of Political Animals, a television series about the life of a divorced former First Lady, serving as Secretary of State. Political Animals received generally favorable reviews from critics according to Metacritic. The series was nominated for the Golden Globe Award for Best Limited or Anthology Series or Television Film, with Burstyn winning the Primetime Emmy Award for Outstanding Supporting Actress in a Comedy Series.

Burstyn portrayed the grandmother of Lou (played by Mackenzie Foy) in Wish You Well (2013). A year later, Burstyn and Foy worked together again in Christopher Nolan's epic science fiction film Interstellar. Set in a dystopian future where humanity is struggling to survive, the film follows a group of astronauts who travel through a wormhole in search of a new home for humanity. The film grossed over $700 million at the box-office.

In 2014, Burstyn made a guest appearance in five episodes of Louis C.K's critically acclaimed FX series Louie. She portrayed an elderly Hungarian neighbor of Louis C.K. in season four. Critic Emily St. James of The A.V. Club described Burstyn's performance as "marvelous". Despite not receiving an Emmy nomination, she garnered awards buzz for her performance. In an interview with The New York Times, Burstyn was asked about her reaction to the accusations of sexual misconduct against Louis C.K. She responded by saying, "Louis just broke my heart because I love him. When I worked with him, I had such admiration for his talent and his person, his being. I know he's a good person, but even good people have sexual hang-ups that hurt other people. I just wish he had gone to therapy or whatever so it didn't have to ruin his life."

In 2014, she also starred in a thriller, The Calling, and the television film Flowers in the Attic. In 2015, Burstyn played Flemming, the daughter of Blake Lively's immortal character in the romantic fantasy film The Age of Adaline. Production started in March 2014, and the film was released in April 2015.

In 2016, Burstyn guest starred in five episodes of the critically acclaimed political thriller House of Cards. The New York Times praised Burstyn's character for adding "vitality and heart"; her performance in the series earned her a nomination for the Primetime Emmy Award for Outstanding Guest Actress in a Drama Series. She acted in a succession of low-budget films, including Custody (2016), The House of Tomorrow (2017), All I Wish (2017), and Nostalgia (2018). Burstyn also starred in Jennifer Fox's mystery drama The Tale, which premiered on HBO on May 26, 2018. Burstyn served as an executive producer for Peter Livolsi's film The House of Tomorrow (2017), about her friend R. Buckminster Fuller, in which she also starred. In 2019, she appeared in the drama film American Woman and the space drama Lucy in the Sky; both films were met with mixed reviews.

In 2019, Burstyn played musicologist Katherine Brandt in an acclaimed Australian production of Moisés Kaufman's play 33 Variations at Melbourne's Comedy Theatre. In 2020, Burstyn appeared in Kornél Mundruczó's drama Pieces of a Woman to great acclaim. The film premiered at the 77th Venice International Film Festival, where it received positive reviews for the performances, with critic David Rooney of The Hollywood Reporter describing Burstyn's performance as "formidable". She received several award nominations for her performance, including a Broadcast Film Critics Association Award and a London Critics Circle Film Award. In 2021, she played the role of Bernadette Stabler in Law & Order: Organized Crime and then portrayed Sara Roosevelt in the series The First Lady.

In 2014, Burstyn indicated she was working on directing a feature film, Bathing Flo. It was announced in July 2021 that Burstyn would reprise her role as Chris MacNeil for the first time since 1973 in the upcoming trilogy of sequels to The Exorcist.

In 2024, Burstyn was featured in filmmaker John Larkin's Fear and Love: The Story of The Exorcist documentary, where she discussed her time working on the original film and her spiritual beliefs. She also discussed why she was reprising the role of Chris MacNeil for The Exorcist: Believer.

== Personal life ==
Burstyn married Bill Alexander in 1950 and divorced in 1957. The next year, she married Paul Roberts, a play director with whom she adopted a son named Jefferson in 1961. The couple divorced that same year, due in part to Roberts' alcoholism. In 1964, she married actor Neil Nephew, who later changed his name to Neil Burstyn. She described Neil Burstyn as "charming and funny and bright and talented and eccentric", but schizophrenia made him violent and he eventually left her. He attempted to reconcile but they divorced in 1972. In her autobiography, Lessons in Becoming Myself, Burstyn revealed that he had stalked her for six years after their divorce, and once raped her while they were still married. No charges were filed, as spousal rape was not yet a crime. He died by suicide in 1978 by jumping from the window of his ninth-floor Manhattan apartment.

Burstyn was raised Catholic, but now affiliates herself with all religious faiths. She follows a form of Sufism, explaining "I am a spirit opening to the truth that lives in all of these religions... I always pray to Spirit, but sometimes, it's to the Goddess. Sometimes, it's to Jesus... Sometimes, I pray to Ganesha if I need an obstacle removed. Guan Yin is one of my favorite manifestations of the divine, the embodiment of compassion... So, I have Guan Yin with me all the time." In her late 30s she began to learn about spirituality, under the instruction of Pir Vilayat Inayat Khan, who gave her the spiritual name Hadiya, which means "she who is guided" in Arabic.

During the 1970s, Burstyn was active in the movement to free convicted boxer Rubin "Hurricane" Carter from jail. She is a supporter of the Democratic Party, and appeared in the 2009 documentary PoliWood. She served as president of the Actors' Equity Association from 1982 to 1985. Burstyn is also on the Board of Selectors of Jefferson Awards for Public Service. In 1997, she was inducted into the Michigan Women's Hall of Fame. Since 2000, she has been co-president of the Actors Studio alongside Al Pacino and Alec Baldwin. In 2013, she was inducted into the American Theatre Hall of Fame for her work on stage.

== Bibliography ==
- Burstyn, Ellen (2006). Lessons in Becoming Myself. Riverhead Books (New York City, New York). ISBN 978-1-59448-929-7.
- Burstyn, Ellen (2026). Poetry Says It Better. HarperOne (New York City, New York). ISBN 978-0063387683

== See also ==
- List of American film actresses
- List of American television actresses
- List of actors with Academy Award nominations
- List of actors with more than one Academy Award nomination in the acting categories
- List of Primetime Emmy Award winners
- List of Golden Globe winners

Preceded by Paul Newman	President of the Actors Studio; 1994–present With: Al Pacino and Harvey Keitel	Succeeded by Incumbent
Preceded by Lee Strasberg (1982); Carlin Glynn (2007); Lee Grant (2007)	Artistic Director of the Actors Studio; 1982–1988; 2007–present With: Al Pacino (1982)	Succeeded by Frank Corsaro (1988); Incumbent
