= House of Tomorrow =

House of Tomorrow or The House of Tomorrow can mean:

- The House of Tomorrow (1949 film), 1949 cartoon directed by Tex Avery
- The House of Tomorrow (album), 1992 album by The Magnetic Fields
- "House of Tomorrow" (Back to You), episode of the TV series Back to You, first aired July 9, 2008
- The House of Tomorrow (2010 novel), written by Peter Bognanni
- The House of Tomorrow (documentary), a 2011 documentary film by Shamim Sarif
- The House of Tomorrow (2017 film), 2017 American drama film based on the 2010 novel
- House of Tomorrow (Indiana), house in Beverly Shores, Indiana, United States
- House of Tomorrow (Baltimore), house in the Guilford neighborhood of Baltimore, Maryland, United States

== See also ==
- 1933 Homes of Tomorrow Exhibition in Chicago, Illinois
