= Fear and Love: The Story of The Exorcist =

2024 documentary film

- Directed by: John Larkin
- Written by: John Larkin
- Produced by: John Larkin; Michael Mastroserio
- Cinematography: Michael Mastroserio; Steven Xie
- Edited by: John Larkin
- Release date: March 26, 2024
- Running time: 61 minutes
- Country: United States
- Language: English

Fear and Love: The Story of The Exorcist is a 2024 American documentary film written, produced, directed, and edited by filmmaker John Larkin. The film serves as a retrospective on the making and legacy of the 1973 horror film The Exorcist, and features interviews with numerous cast and crew members who contributed to its production.

== Synopsis ==
The film examines the production and cultural impact of The Exorcist through interviews and archival footage.

== Background ==
Director John Larkin began developing the project after watching The Exorcist for the first time, having previously avoided it for over 20 years. He spent five years researching and producing the documentary, aiming to release it in time for the film's 50th anniversary.

== Production ==
The film was independently financed with a budget of approximately $31,000. Over five years, Larkin conducted research, arranged interviews, and edited the film, primarily without institutional support. During the COVID-19 pandemic, he chose not to conduct remote interviews in order to maintain an in-person visual style.

== Cast ==
=== Interview subjects ===
- Ellen Burstyn, who portrayed Chris MacNeil
- Chris Newman, sound recordist
- Rick Baker, makeup artist, who began his career under Dick Smith
- Chuck Waters, stuntman
- Ron Faber, who portrayed assistant director Chuck
- Juliet Taylor, casting director
- Father William O'Malley, Jesuit priest and actor, in his final recorded interview

== Release ==
The film premiered on October 25, 2024. It became available on streaming platforms such as Tubi, Amazon Prime Video, and Reveel. It was distributed via FilmHub.

== Reception ==
=== Critical response ===
UK Film Review awarded the film 4 out of 5 stars, calling it "a surprisingly detailed and personal look" at the horror classic. The review praised Larkin's editing and emotional restraint, stating it "delivers a more introspective—even emotional—edge compared to typical making-of documentaries."

Matt Hudson, contributing to Rotten Tomatoes, praised the editing and emotional pacing, writing, "Fear and Love was able to provide fresh takes and new anecdotes that, thanks also to the strong editing, came together to create a wonderfully intimate and thoroughly enjoyable documentary."
