= Whitney Otto =

American novelist

- Born: March 5, 1955 (age 71); California, U.S.
- Education: University of the Pacific; San Diego State University; University of California, Irvine
- Occupation: Novelist
- Writing career
- Notable work: How to Make an American Quilt (1991)

Whitney Otto (born March 5, 1955) is an American novelist best known for her debut novel How to Make an American Quilt.

== Life and career ==
Otto was born and raised in California to a couple who later divorced; her father was an engineer, while her mother worked in advertising. She attended university at the University of the Pacific, San Diego State University, and the University of California, Irvine before graduating. Currently she lives in Portland, Oregon with her family, where they moved from San Francisco. Her first novel, How to Make an American Quilt, was a New York Times bestseller, and was featured on other bestseller lists as well; it was also a New York Times Notable Book, was nominated for the Art Seidenbaum Award, and was adapted into a feature film. Two of her other novels, The Passion Dream Book and Now You See Her, were optioned for films; the first was nominated for an Oregon Book Award, while the latter was a Los Angeles Times bestseller. Her works have been published in fourteen languages. Otto's writing has also been anthologized; some of her pieces have appeared in The New York Times, The Los Angeles Times, The Oregonian, and The San Francisco Chronicle, as well as in magazines.

As a writer, Otto has been described as a "democrat", choosing to tell her stories using multiple narrative voices. She has taught at a number of writing workshops during her career. In 1990 she received an Outstanding Teacher Award from the University of California, Irvine; she has also been awarded a number of other prizes and grants during her career. Otto has also been active as an artist, crafting shadow boxes that have been exhibited at a gallery in Portland. She has also spoken of her love for photography and the creative life; though not a photographer herself, she based her most recent novel on the stories of a number of prominent women photographers whose lives she fictionalized.

== Works ==
- How to Make an American Quilt (1991)
- Now You See Her (1994)
- The Passion Dream Book (1998)
- A Collection of Beauties at the Height of Their Popularity (2002)
- Eight Girls Taking Pictures (2012)
- Art For the Ladlylike: An Autobiography Through Other Lives (2021)
