= House of Tomorrow (Baltimore) =

The House of Tomorrow
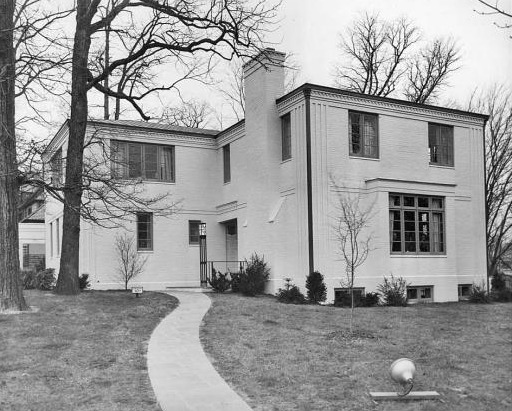
- Interactive map of The House of Tomorrow

General information
- Location: 3707 Saint Paul Street, Baltimore, MD
- Coordinates: 39°20′03″N 76°36′53″W
- Completed: 1937

The House of Tomorrow is an Art Deco style house that was built in 1937 in the Guilford neighborhood of Baltimore, Maryland.

== History ==
In October 1936, George Streeter, at the department of Embryology at the Carnegie Institute in Washington, and his wife, Julia Streeter, purchased one of the last remaining lots in the Roland Park Company's successful Guilford residential development. The couple hired John Ahlers, of the Roland Park Company to design their new home. The F.E. Wurzbacher Corporation completed its construction in the spring of 1937.

Before the Streeters occupied their house, The Roland Park Company used it as an exhibition house, which they dubbed "The House of Tomorrow." For an admission fee of 10 cents, members of the public could tour the house, which had been furnished and decorated by the local Stewart and Company department store for exhibition.

Promoters touted the "re-strained modern influence" on both the interior and its exterior. The house received the Good Housekeeping Shield in the Good Housekeeping Program of Better Standards in Building.

== Style and architecture ==
The "House of Tomorrow" is a two-story, white painted brick house that uses elements of modernized classicism, though without the disciplined rigor of classical symmetry.

An L-Shaped building, the house has a low hip roof clad in copper that looks almost flat from certain vantage points. Copper downspouts drop from the roof at each corner. The facade, facing south, is symmetrical; a central door is flanked by large, fifteen-pane casement windows on the first story, and a long vertical expanse of glass block directly above the door is flanked by eight-pane windows on the second story. The door is recessed and surround by glass block. This entrance no longer serves as the primary entrance; it leads to a patio, sheltered by a large awning.

The House is now accessed by what was once a secondary entrance on the north facade. Off center, to the left, within the two inner elevations of the L Shape, it has a solid wood door with a multilane transom and sidelights. To the right of the door is a large, imposing chimney stack.

The ornamental program of the house includes a cornice with brick dental, scored pilasters at the corners, and vertical glass-block sidelights at both entrances. A two-car flat roofed garage is banked into a slope and connected to the house by a covered walkway."

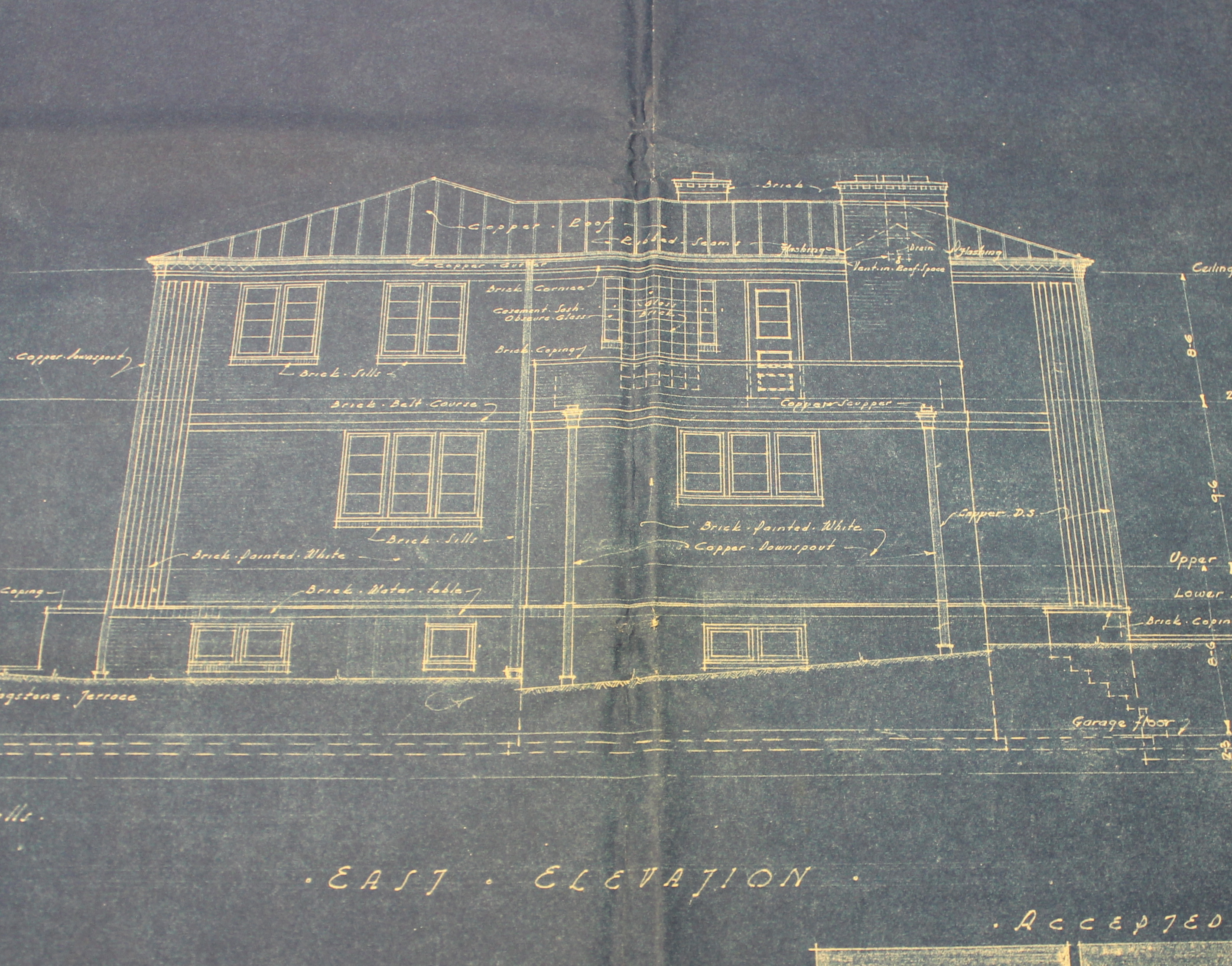
3707 St. Paul Street. Baltimore, MD 1

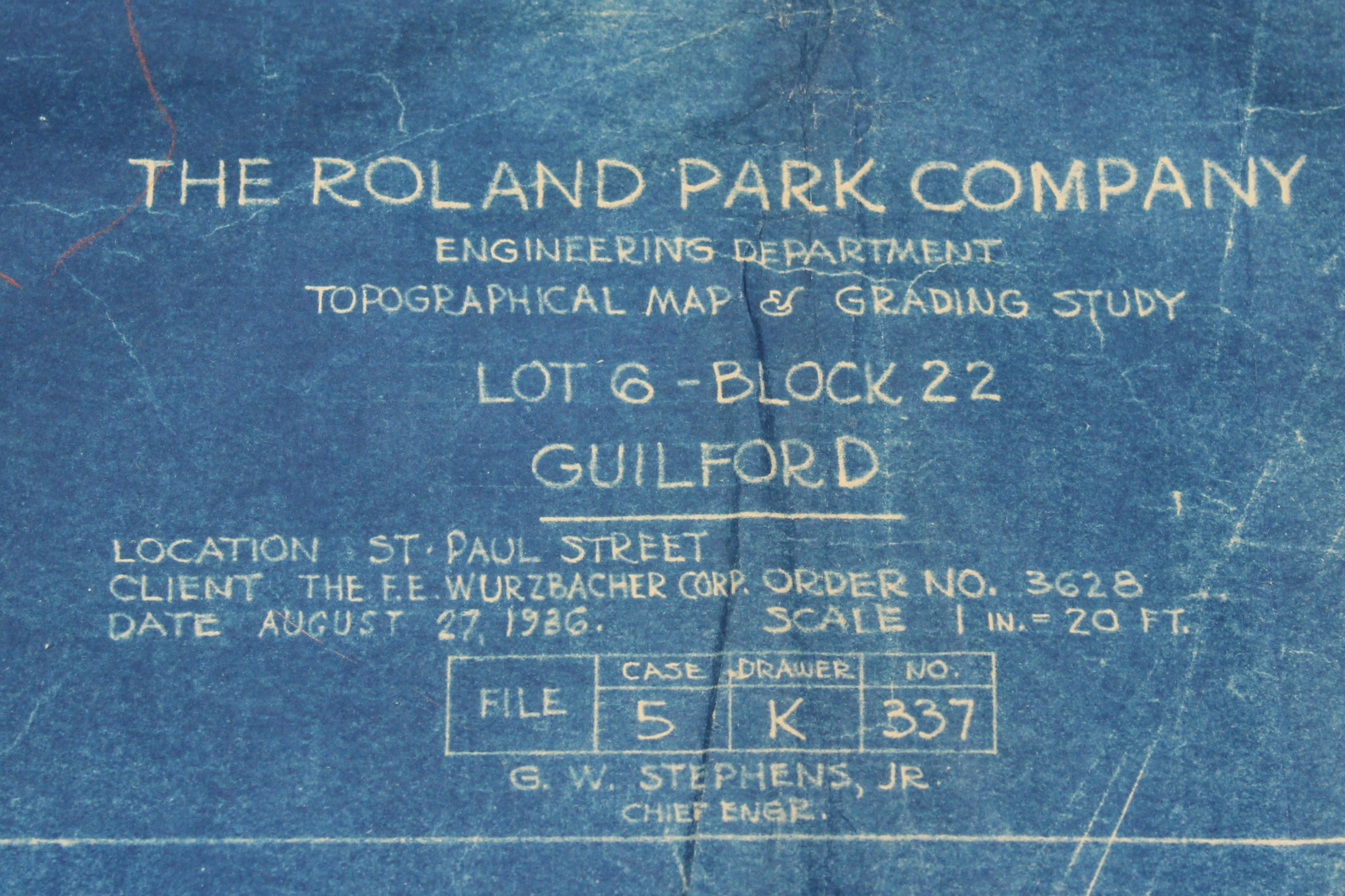
3707 St. Paul Street. Baltimore, MD 2

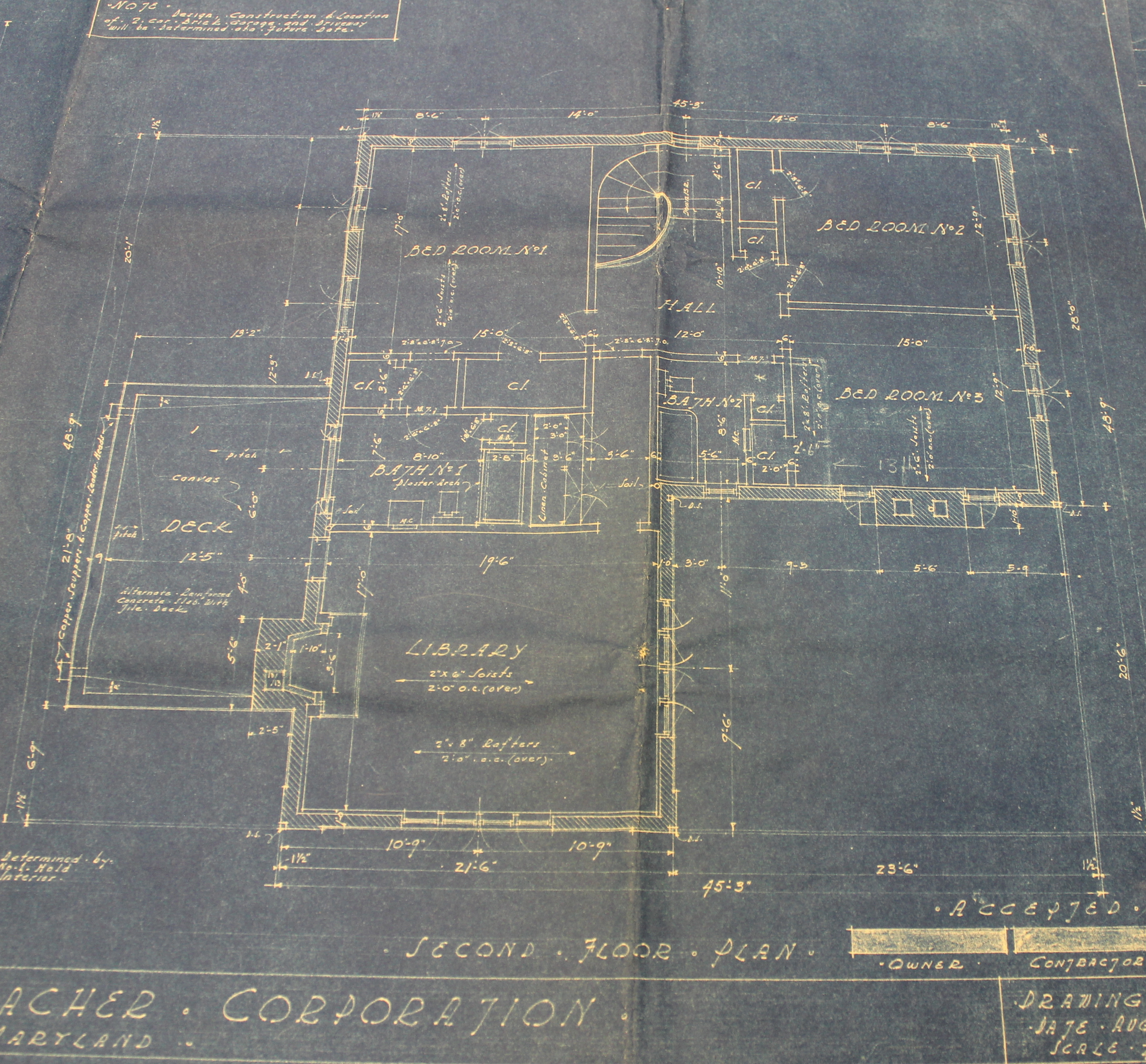
3707 St. Paul Street. Baltimore, MD 3

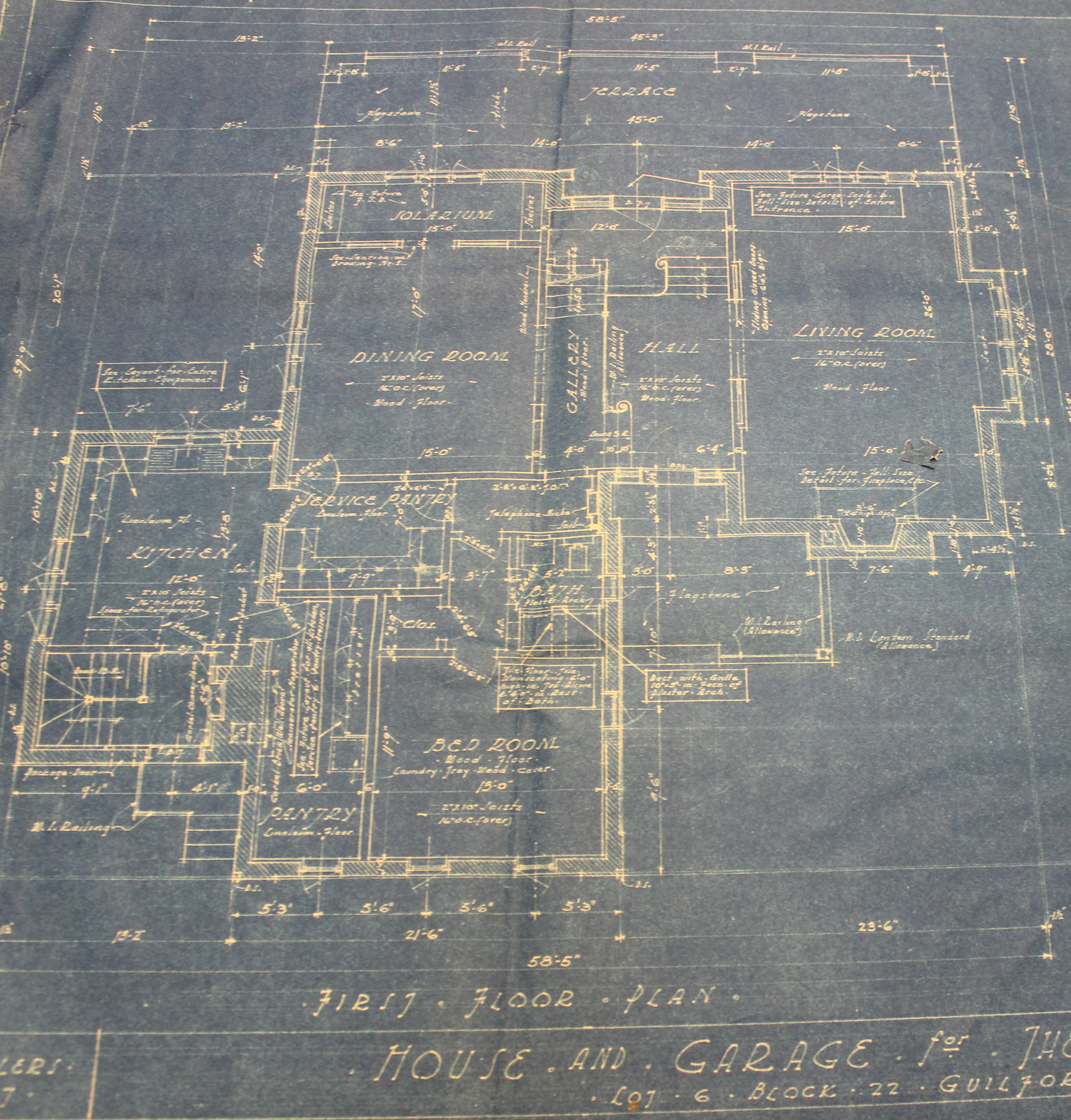
3707 St. Paul Street. Baltimore, MD 4

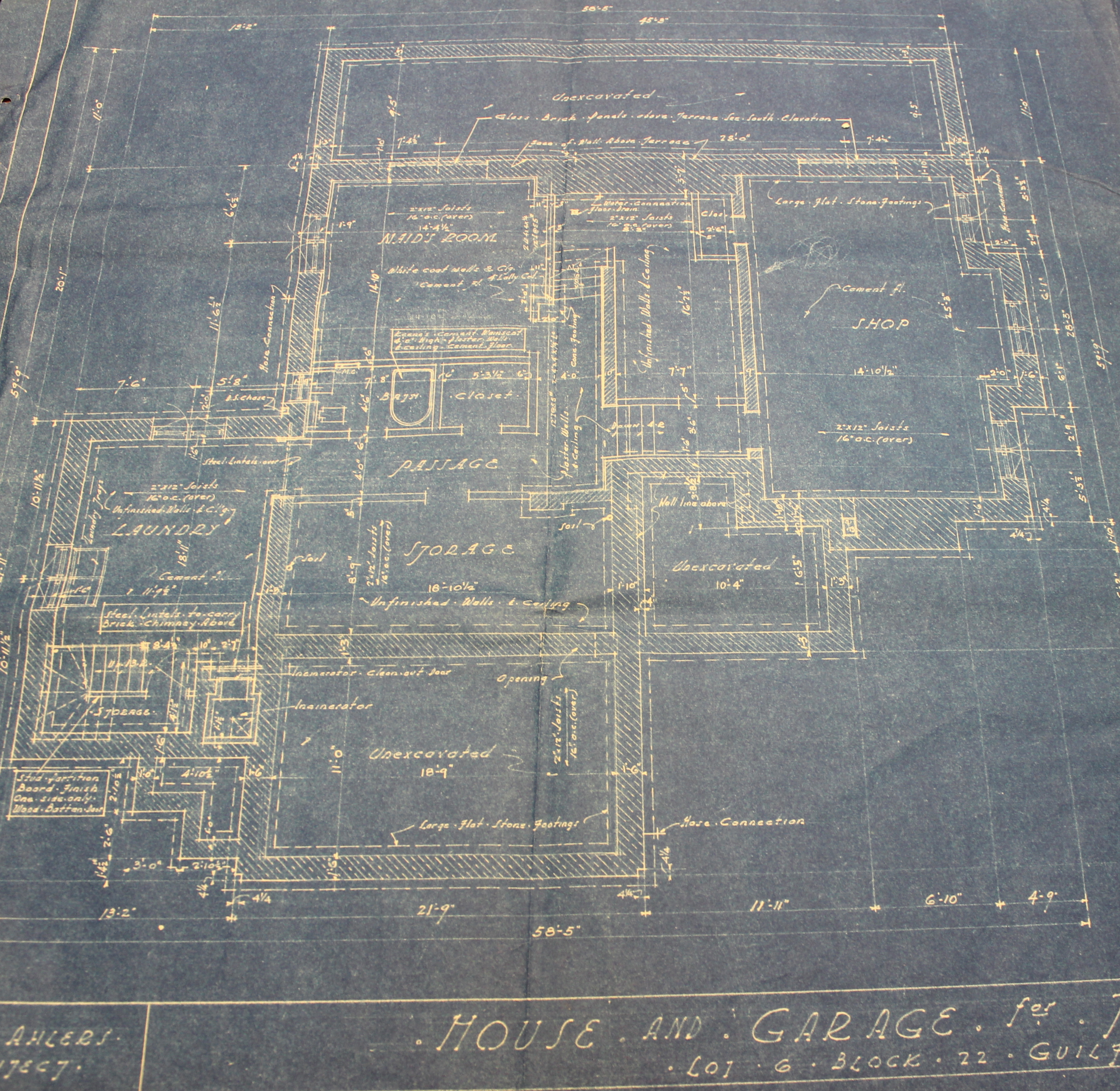
3707 St. Paul Street. Baltimore, MD 5

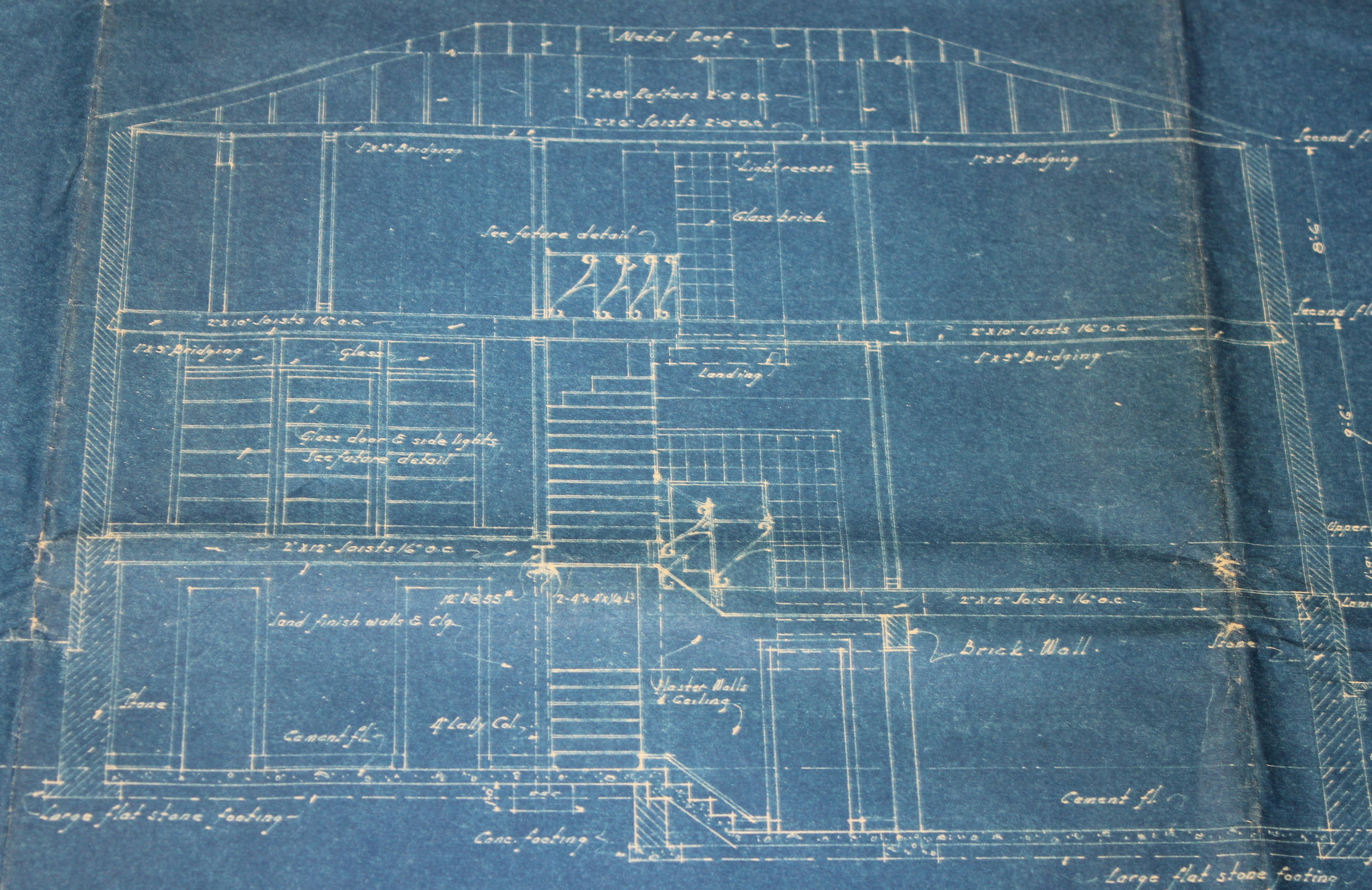
3707 St. Paul Street. Baltimore, MD 6
