= How to Make an American Quilt (novel) =

1991 novel by Whitney Otto

How to Make an American Quilt (1991) is the debut novel of Whitney Otto. The novel tells the intersecting stories of several generations of women who together are part of the same quilting circle in the fictional town of Grasse, California. The novel was made into a movie of the same name in 1995 directed by Jocelyn Moorhouse and starring Winona Ryder as Finn Dodd.

== Plot ==
In the present day, 26-year-old history graduate student Finn contemplates marriage. She decides to return to Grasse, California for the summer where eight members of a quilting group, some of whom she is related to, are sewing a free-form crazy quilt for her wedding.

=== The Flower Girls ===
Sisters Glady Joe and Hy (short for Gladiola Josephine and Hyacinth) are sisters who live together now that they are both widowed. Glady Joe was married to Arthur Cleary, but as the years wore on they discovered that they had more of a platonic friendship and the two stopped having sex.

In their 50s, James Dodd, Hy's husband, became ill with ALS. He soon needs to be confined permanently to a hospital. Hy finds herself thinking that she hopes he will die soon and becomes frustrated with herself, abruptly leaving the hospital. She calls Glady Joe's husband Arthur and orders him to drive her as far out of town as possible. Watching her take a nap Arthur is struck by her similarity with his wife and kisses her. Hy awakens and the two have sex. They then return to Glady Joe's home where she immediately realizes what has happened and becomes infuriated with her husband, smashing things and throwing them at her husband. She then begins to tile the walls with the objects she has smashed. Finally feeling she cannot forgive her sister Glady Joe goes to the hospital intending to tell James about the affair but seeing him and her sister together she has a change of heart and decides to forgive Hy and Arthur.

=== Sophia Darling ===
When she is 17 and diving at a public pool Sophia Darling is spotted by Preston Richards, a young college student. He asks her out on a date and she takes him to a quarry where he watches her dive and then the two have sex. Preston believes that he has fallen in love with her and tells Sophia he wants to be a geologist while she dreams of travelling with him and swimming all around the world. However Sophia is impregnated after her first sexual encounter and the two settle down in Grasse and both have unhappy lives, never able to travel the way they wanted to. The couple have three children; Duff, who wants to go to school and have a career, Preston junior who is very close to his mother, and Edie, who, when she is 16 also conceives a child. Sophia tries to force Edie to marry the father of her child but when she refuses she sends her away to have the child and then give it up for adoption. In her 9th month Edie runs away to live with Duff who now works in Chicago.

=== String of Pearls ===
Constance Saunders is a solitary woman who married her husband Howell in her early 30s. Accustomed to being alone she was happy when they had no children and moved around because of Howell's job as a travelling salesman. When the couple moved to Grasse, Howell eventually retired and stayed at home and while Constance was initially annoyed, she later came to enjoy this period of their life. However Howell died shortly after leaving Constance alone. Dean, Em's husband, began to stop by her house after Howell's death, initially on the pretext of helping her with things around the house but later just to reminisce as they were both born and raised on the East Coast and missed the changing of the seasons. Though the entire quilting circle believes they are having an affair they do not, however one night as Dean is going home he turns on his car radio and hears the song String of Pearls and dances with Constance in the street, whereas she realizes she misses physical affection and backs away from Dean for a brief period.

=== Umbrellas Will Not Help at All ===
Em Reed is eaten up by jealousy believing that Constance is having an affair with her husband Dean though her friends in the quilting circle try to reassure her. Unbeknownst to them Dean, who is a painter, repeatedly had affairs throughout their marriage, at first with one of the students at the community college where he taught and then with some other women. The second time he had an affair, Em left him only to discover that she was pregnant. Dean pursued her throughout her pregnancy and they reunited when she was seven months pregnant. Unable to bear the thought of him having another affair with Constance, Em decides to finally leave but before she goes she enters Dean's studio which she has never entered before. She comes across portraits of herself throughout the years and realizes she cannot leave a man who understands her so thoroughly.

=== Outdoors ===
Corrina Amurri and Hy Dodd have their firstborn children, two boys, within weeks of each other. The boys, Laury Amurri and Will Dodd, grow up like brothers. Corrina, who married her husband Jack just before the Second World War is proud of her son, but upset, when he goes to fight in the Vietnam War. Will, inspired by Dean Reed, defers to go to college as an art student. Away at school Will begins to call Corrina. Jack meanwhile begins sleeping outdoors as his son being at war is giving him residual PTSD. Laury goes MIA and Jack tells Corrina he hopes that he is not taken prisoner as that would be the worse thing. Corrina goes to dinner with Hy where Will is home on vacation. Though his parents disapprove of him and think he is on drugs, Corrina thinks they are lucky to have him at home and alive. When Corrina becomes overwhelmed she goes out to the garden where Will tells her that he feels as if he is missing his better half now that Laury is at war and he calls Corrina because he misses him so terribly. Corrina decides to leave the party and walk home. She and Jack later learn that their son was killed in action.

=== Tears Like Diamond Stars ===
Anna Neale is a mixed-race child of black and white parentage who is raised by her aunt Pauline who works as a domestic for a wealthy couple during the 1930s. Pauline has a family quilt which shows the history of the family which is called The Life Before. The mrs. of the house covets the quilt but Pauline refuses to sell it to her. She eventually caves when Anna is a teenager as she wants to buy her a telescope to foster her interest in astronomy. Anna is horrified and Pauline comes to regret her choice, especially as the mrs. has the quilt mounted and Pauline must look at it every day as she cleans. When Anna is 16 she takes the quilt and runs away.

Anna goes to work for wealthy ranchers. When their young son who is Anna's age comes to visit he is enamoured of her and the two sleep together resulting in Anna becoming pregnant. Knowing that, because he is white, the rancher's son will never marry her she leaves again. She goes to Grasse where the Rubens take in "wayward girls" until they can have their children and give them up for adoption.

The Reubens have two children, Glady Joe and Hy. Glady Joe tries to befriend Anna and eventually succeeds, reading her Wuthering Heights and Jane Eyre, which Anna enjoys, and other works by white authors like Henry Miller and Leo Tolstoy which Anna does not. Pauline begins sending Anna stories by Zora Neale Hurston and other black writers and Anna reads them to Glady Joe.

Anna has her baby, Marianna, and does not give her up. She gets a job working as an accountant but is bored. When Glady Joe marries and has children she asks Anna to come to work for her and the two eventually form the quilting circle with Anna as the head quilter. Years later as they are looking at old family pictures together Anna regrets not allowing herself to be photographed more as she realizes that, despite her reluctance, she has come to be heavily involved with Glady Joe and her family.

Grafting Roses

Marianna, Anna's daughter, has many lovers. (" more lovers than she is aware of; that is, she is admired from afar.") Marianna is known to have been intimate with many males, some of whom are married and have children. Marianna is known to be noticed by men in cafes or walking to her job. She doesn't find it to be "inappropriate" at all, she finds it very harm-less. After a few years in France, Marianna met one man that she stayed close to. They fought constantly but loved more. She found herself going back to him.

== Reception ==
The novel drew praise upon its release. The L.A. Times called it "an intelligent, brief and highly original novel."
