= How to Make an American Quilt =

1995 film by Jocelyn Moorhouse

- Theatrical release poster
- Directed by: Jocelyn Moorhouse
- Screenplay by: Jane Anderson
- Based on: How to Make an American Quilt by Whitney Otto
- Produced by: Sarah Pillsbury; Midge Sanford
- Starring: Winona Ryder; Anne Bancroft; Ellen Burstyn; Kate Nelligan; Alfre Woodard; Maya Angelou; Kate Capshaw; Loren Dean; Samantha Mathis; Dermot Mulroney; Derrick O'Connor; Jean Simmons; Lois Smith; Rip Torn; Mykelti Williamson
- Cinematography: Janusz Kamiński
- Edited by: Jill Bilcock
- Music by: Thomas Newman
- Production company: Amblin Entertainment
- Distributed by: Universal Pictures
- Release date: October 6, 1995
- Running time: 117 minutes
- Country: United States
- Language: English
- Budget: $10 million
- Box office: $41 million

How to Make an American Quilt is a 1995 American drama film based on the 1991 novel by Whitney Otto. Directed by Jocelyn Moorhouse, the film features Winona Ryder, Anne Bancroft, Maya Angelou, Jean Simmons, Ellen Burstyn, Kate Nelligan and Alfre Woodard. It is notable as being Jared Leto's film debut. Amblin Entertainment optioned Otto's novel in 1991, and were able to persuade Steven Spielberg to finance the screenplay's development. How to Make an American Quilt received mixed reviews from critics. It was a box-office success, grossing $41 million against a $10 million budget. The film was nominated for the Screen Actors Guild Award for Outstanding Performance by a Cast in a Motion Picture.

== Characters ==
=== Finn Dodd ===
Main character. Following her boyfriend Sam's proposal, Finn visits her great-aunt and grandmother to finish her thesis and think it over. At her grandmother's, a quilting group congregates, and she's shocked and surprised to discover that the current quilt that they're working on is a wedding gift for her when she gets married. The theme of the quilt is "where love resides". As Finn is unsure whether she's ready for marriage or if he's "the one", the women's stories in the quilting group open her eyes to the different kinds of love that exist.

During her time at her grandmother's, she meets Leon at the local pool and they have a brief affair. Eventually, wrapped in her quilt and following a crow (reminiscent of Anna's tale about her aunt), she comes across Sam and chooses to stay with him.

=== Sophia Darling ===
In her early 20s, Sophia was a talented diver with dreams of escaping her small town and overbearing mother. One day she meets Preston Richards while diving at the local pool and romance ensues. He's attracted by her fearlessness and she believes he can take her away from her current, oppressive way of life. However, motherhood turns out to be just as, if not more, oppressive and married life soon grinds her down. With three children and little help from Preston who is frequently away because of his job, she no longer has time to dive and eventually forgets the feeling of freedom and escape it gives her.

One day she snaps at Preston for digging a pond in the back garden. Trying to remind her of the girl he fell in love with, he tells her the pond is for her to wade in. After she rejects his efforts, he realizes her free spirit is gone. One morning, he leaves for work, never to return. Abandoned, bitter, and trapped in a life she didn't want, Sophia ends up like her overbearing mother, particularly in her relationship with Finn.

Years later, when the wind blows part of Finn's thesis into the pond, she wades in to get it. With her feet in the pool, she remembers what her husband tried to remind her of all those years ago, and one of the last scenes shows her diving off the high dive and playing with a flamingo.

=== Em Reed ===
Em marries young, like most of the women in the story. Despite the promiscuity of her artistic husband Dean, she stays with him for a period of time. Eventually, after discovering yet another affair, she leaves him whilst pregnant. She returns to her parents' home, but it still takes three months before Dean comes to find her. He begs forgiveness yet again, and her parents pack her bags, loading them into Dean's car. At this point, Em has no choice but to return to her broken life.

Years later, she suspects Constance is having an affair with Dean, which causes friction between them. Later, she realizes that, in his own way, Dean does truly love her when she takes shelter in his studio during a sudden wind storm and discovers numerous paintings of her telling the story of their life together over the years.

=== Glady Joe Cleary and Hy Dodd ===
Gladiola (Glady) Joe and Hyacinth (Hy) are Finn's great-aunt and grandmother and sisters to one another. At one point, Hy goes to visit her dying husband in the hospital. Despite her deep love for her husband, she leaves the hospital and sleeps with Glady's husband Arthur in a moment of weakness and tragic emotion.

After Glady discovers the truth, she smashes every one of her porcelain figurines and plasters them onto the wall of the laundry room as a reminder of her anger. She never really forgives Arthur and does not forgive Hy until the end of the movie. Their reconciliation is symbolized by the demolition of the plastered walls in the laundry room when Glady realizes that her love for her sister surpasses her feelings of betrayal.

=== Constance Saunders ===
Constance had a happy and fulfilling marriage until her husband Howell died, leaving her a young widow. While he was alive, he gave Constance a dog to keep her company. Although it is rumored that she is having an affair with Dean, she knows that her love for her husband and her dog are her true companions. Her panel for Finn's wedding quilt depicts a yellow rose bush under which she and Howell buried the dog after the dog died.

=== Anna Neale ===
As a young maid, Anna starts an affair with her boss's son Beck, who's visiting from Chicago. She becomes pregnant by him, and when her great-aunt Pauline finds out about it she sends Anna away with their family story quilt (which she had sold to the boss's wife). During her pregnancy, Anna met Glady and Hy as she was taken in by their family.

Anna becomes particularly close with Glady, eventually teaching her to quilt. During one of these quilting lessons, she starts labor, eventually giving birth to Marianna. It's only then that Anna realizes that her fancy notion of romantic love was nothing in comparison to the maternal love she feels for Marianna. Anna now orchestrates the quilting group.

=== Maranna Neale ===
Maranna gives the appearance of being in love with her promiscuous freedom until a moment of vulnerability comes in a conversation with Finn. She speaks of a man that she met in France. They had met and spent one evening together during which they connected over a meeting of minds before she discovered that he was married. Although she has taken many lovers since, she realizes this man is her soulmate and she doesn't even know his name.

== Cast ==
- Winona Ryder as Finn Dodd
  - Kaelynn and Sara Craddick as young Finn Dodd
- Anne Bancroft as Glady Joe Cleary
  - Claire Danes as young Glady Joe Cleary
- Ellen Burstyn as Hy Dodd
  - Lecy Goranson as young Hy Dodd
- Lois Smith as Sophia Darling Richards
  - Samantha Mathis as young Sophia Darling
- Jean Simmons as Em Reed
  - Joanna Going as young Em Reed
- Kate Nelligan as Constance Saunders
- Alfre Woodard as Marianna Neale
- Maya Angelou as Anna Neale
  - María Celedonio as young Anna Neale
- Kate Capshaw as Sally Dodd
- Loren Dean as Preston Richards
- Dermot Mulroney as Sam
- Derrick O'Connor as Dean Reed
  - Tim Guinee as young Dean Reed
- Rip Torn as Arthur Cleary
- Mykelti Williamson as Winston
- Jared Leto as Beck
- Adam Baldwin as Mr. Dodd
- Johnathon Schaech as Leon
- Richard Jenkins as Howell Saunders
- Denis Arndt as James
- Paige and Ryanne Kettner as Little Evie/Little Duff
- Tamala Jones as Anna's Great Grandmother
- Esther Rolle as Aunt Pauline

== Production ==
Amblin Entertainment optioned Whitney Otto's bestselling novel after it was released in 1991. Amblin co-founder Kathleen Kennedy brought on producers Sarah Pillsbury and Midge Sanford, who had read and loved the book before its publication. When the two producers could not field potential interest in the film from studios, they persuaded Steven Spielberg to finance the development of a screenplay, something which was rarely done without a studio's backing. Said Spielberg, "I've always loved stories about women. I had three younger sisters. I was the only boy. Amblin until recently was dominated by women. That feminine side of my brain is very strong."

Sanford and Pillsbury reached out to screenwriter Jane Anderson to pen the script and chose Australian filmmaker Jocelyn Moorhouse as the director. One of the structural changes that Anderson brought to the adaptation was turning the role of Finn, who is a periphery character in the novel, into the main character. Winona Ryder was the producers' first choice for the role.

To avoid the possibility of audience confusion at the various storylines that jump back and forth in time, the filmmakers intended for "the [characters'] flashbacks [to] be very distinct little movies. They each have a slightly different tone. One story is a comic melodrama, one is tragic, one is a slice of life, one is kind of a fable."

Patty McCormick, president of the Southern California Council of Quilt Guilds, assisted in the assembly of the film's quilts and worked individually with actresses to master the use of thimbles. Anne Bancroft and Maya Angelou were the only actresses with quilting experience.

How to Make an American Quilt was one of the last films to be produced by Amblin before the company was absorbed into DreamWorks.

== Reception ==
How to Make an American Quilt received mixed reviews from critics. It holds a 62% rating on Rotten Tomatoes based on 34 reviews, with an average rating of 6/10. The site's consensus states: "How to Make an American Quilt is a bit of a patchwork from a storytelling standpoint, but a strong ensemble cast led by Winona Ryder helps hold it all together."

In a review for The New York Times, Caryn James gave praise to both Moorhouse's "cut-to-the-quick" direction and Anderson's script for crafting an adaptation of a "decidedly uncinematic novel." She added that the film manages to give off the impression that "we are not watching movie women but real women, with shaky judgment and lifetimes of reasons to resent and forgive one another as well as all the men in their lives." Roger Ebert commended the stories involving Woodard and Capshaw's characters for being the most heartfelt but found the rest of them devoid of any emotional resonance compared to the tales told in the film adaptation of Amy Tan's The Joy Luck Club, stating that they have lives "largely recycled from sweet movies and tasteful romantic novels." Eve Zibart of The Washington Post stated that despite Bancroft's performance being "right on the ceiling" in terms of over the top and saying that Ryder "seems for once to be acting, and not entirely comfortably", she praised the rest of the actresses for being "theatrical indulgence by a cast of stahs."

The film was nominated for Outstanding Performance by a Cast in a Motion Picture at the 2nd Screen Actors Guild Awards, but lost to Apollo 13. Ryder and Mulroney were nominated for Best Kiss at the 1996 MTV Movie Awards, but lost to Natasha Henstridge and Anthony Guidera for Species.
