= The People vs. Jean Harris =

1981 television film by George Schaefer

- Written by: George Lefferts
- Directed by: George Schaefer
- Starring: Ellen Burstyn; Martin Balsam; Richard Dysart; Peter Coyote
- Narrated by: Millie Slavin
- Composer: Brad Fiedel
- Country of origin: United States
- Original language: English

Production
- Executive producer: Paul Klein
- Producer: George Schaefer
- Editors: Danny White; Harold McKenzie
- Running time: 147 minutes
- Production company: PKO Television

Original release
- Network: NBC
- Release: May 7 – May 8, 1981

The People vs. Jean Harris is a 1981 American legal drama television film directed and produced by George Schaefer. The screenplay, written by George Lefferts, is based on a transcript of the trial of Jean Harris, who was convicted of murdering her ex-lover Herman Tarnower. The film stars Ellen Burstyn as Harris, with Martin Balsam, Richard Dysart, and Peter Coyote in supporting roles.

The People vs. Jean Harris originally aired in two parts on NBC on May 7 and 8, 1981. For her performance, Burstyn was nominated for her first Primetime Emmy Award and a Golden Globe Award.

== Cast ==
- Ellen Burstyn as Jean Harris
- Martin Balsam as Joel Aurnou
- Richard Dysart as Russell R. Leggett
- Peter Coyote as George Bolen
- Priscilla Morrill as Juanita Edwards
- Al Ruscio as Siciliano
- Milton Selzer as Dr. Roth
- Alan Manson as Dr. Ryan
- Alvin Ing as Dr. Roh
- Sarah Marshall as Suzanne van der Vreken

== Production ==
Producer Paul Klein, who founded PKO Television, based The People vs. Jean Harris on the actual transcripts from the trial of Jean Harris. He presented the concept to NBC four days before Mrs. Harris was found guilty, on February 24, 1981.

Principal photography began on March 20, 1981, meaning that the entire process, including casting and creating the 360-page screenplay from 10,000 pages of transcript, took less than eight weeks. The film was shot and set entirely in the courtroom.

== Reception ==
=== Critical response ===
John J. O'Connor of The New York Times praised Ellen Burstyn's portrayal of Harris, calling it "a thoroughly absorbing, incredibly modulated performance." He also wrote, "Within the context of the script written by George Lefferts and of the scrupulously unflashy direction by George Schaefer, the verdict of guilty is not only understandable but inevitable."

=== Portrayal of Jean Harris ===
After watching the first televised segment of the film, Harris was reported by people who have seen her to be unhappy with Burstyn's portrayal of her. Harris was said to have felt that although the actress represented her sympathetically, it was also a portrayal that lacked the sharp edges and brisk exchanges of her eight days as a witness.

Prosecutor George Bolen said, "I don't think the Mrs. Harris at the trial was the Mrs. Harris portrayed on television", and an assistant district attorney said, "Mrs. Harris was very proud, cocky, even snobbish. If she was as Ellen Burstyn portrayed her, things might have turned out differently." In addition, Bolen felt that "The People vs. Jean Harris was an accurate but sometimes boring portrayal of the trial" and "Mrs. Harris was portrayed a certain way in the media with certain insights into her character."

=== Accolades ===
Year	Award	Category	Nominee(s)	Result	Ref.
1981	Primetime Emmy Awards	Outstanding Lead Actress in a Limited Series or a Special	Ellen Burstyn	Nominated	
1981	Primetime Emmy Awards	Outstanding Achievement in Technical Direction and Electronic Camerawork	George Falardeau, Royden Holm, Reed Howard, and O. Tamburri	Nominated	
1982	Golden Globe Awards	Best Actress in a Miniseries or Motion Picture Made for Television	Ellen Burstyn	Nominated	
