= The House of Tomorrow (2017 film) =

American independent drama film

- Theatrical release poster
- Directed by: Peter Livolsi
- Screenplay by: Peter Livolsi
- Based on: The House of Tomorrow by Peter Bognanni
- Produced by: Tarik Karam; Danielle Renfrew Behrens
- Starring: Ellen Burstyn; Nick Offerman; Asa Butterfield; Alex Wolff; Maude Apatow; Michaela Watkins
- Cinematography: Corey Walter
- Edited by: Brian Williams; Alexander Short
- Music by: Rob Simonsen
- Production companies: Superlative Films; Water's End Productions
- Distributed by: Shout! Studios
- Release dates: April 8, 2017 (San Francisco); April 20, 2018 (United States)
- Running time: 85 minutes
- Country: United States
- Language: English
- Budget: $8.6 million
- Box office: $6.9 million

The House of Tomorrow is a 2017 American independent comedy-drama film written and directed by Peter Livolsi and starring Asa Butterfield and Alex Wolff. The film is based on the 2010 novel of the same name, by Peter Bognanni, a literature professor at Macalester College, in Saint Paul, Minnesota. It is Livolsi's directorial debut. Co-stars Ellen Burstyn and Nick Offerman served as executive producers of the film.

== Plot ==
Sebastian Prendergast lives in a geodesic dome, a dated tourist museum, called the House of Tomorrow with his futurist grandmother, Josephine. Sebastian longs to leave his isolated existence which quickly changes when he meets Jared Whitcomb, a young nascent punk rocker with a heart replacement, and his sister Meredith. Inspired by Jared to rebel, Sebastian is induced to steal an electric bass guitar and join Jared in forming a punk rock group.

== Cast ==
- Asa Butterfield as Sebastian Prendergast, Josephine's grandson and Jared's friend
- Alex Wolff as Jared Whitcomb, Sebastian's friend, Meredith's brother and Alan's son
- Nick Offerman as Alan Whitcomb, Meredith and Jared's father
- Ellen Burstyn as Josephine Prendergast, Sebastian's grandmother, obsessed by all things Buckminster Fuller, even providing retro-futurist tours of her geodesic home, including authentic video of Buckminster Fuller talking and sailing with Ellen Burstyn, who had actually befriended him in real life.
- Maude Apatow as Meredith Whitcomb, Jared's sister and Alan's daughter
- Michaela Watkins as Mrs. Whitcomb, Meredith and Jared's mother and Alan's ex-wife
- Fred Armisen as Tour Video Narrator (voice)

== Production ==
Some of the film was shot in Minnesota: Robbinsdale, St. Michael, North Branch, St. Paul, and the Dennis Odin Johnson Geodesic House. According to Maude Apatow, the film was shot in 18 days.

== Reception ==
The film has a 75% rating on Rotten Tomatoes, based on 36 reviews with an average score of 6.27/10. The website's critics consensus reads: "Familiar yet endearing, The House of Tomorrow is a well-told coming-of-age comedy that marks an auspicious if not indispensable debut from writer-director Peter Livolsi." Colin Covert of the Star Tribune awarded the film four stars. Leah Greenblatt of Entertainment Weekly graded the film a B. Jeffrey M. Anderson of Common Sense Media gave the film three stars out of five. Both Susan Wloszczyna of RogerEbert.com and Barbara VanDenburgh of The Arizona Republic gave it three stars. Wes Greene of Slant Magazine awarded the film two and a half stars out of four. Joe Friar of The Victoria Advocate awarded the film three stars out of four.

Sheri Linden of The Hollywood Reporter gave the film a positive review, calling it "a confident and perfectly cast debut feature."

Robert Abele of TheWrap also gave the film a positive review and wrote, "what makes the movie organically enjoyable outside of its expected direction is that the manifestation of Sebastian's and Jared's mutually beneficial attachment is, in Livolsi's hands, a delicate simmer instead of a sentimental splash, and tended to with plenty of deadpan wit and honest feeling."

Walter Addiego of the San Francisco Chronicle gave the film a negative review and wrote "Part of what's missing in The House of Tomorrow is the acerbic punk spirit that inspires its two heroes, which could have been remedied by a sharper script."
