= Pack of Lies =

1983 play by Hugh Whitemore

Poster for the original West End production

Pack of Lies is a 1983 play by English writer Hugh Whitemore, itself adapted from his Act of Betrayal, an episode of the BBC anthology series Play of the Month transmitted in 1971.

Based on a true story, the plot centres on Bob and Barbara Jackson (in real life Bill and Ruth Search) and their teenage daughter Julie (in real life Gay Search, later a television reporter and newspaper journalist in the UK). The Jacksons are friendly with their neighbours, Peter and Helen Kroger, until the couple are arrested and charged with espionage in 1961. It is revealed the Krogers actually are Morris and Lona Cohen, who during the 1950s and 1960s worked with fellow spy Gordon Lonsdale (real name Konon Molody) photographing and encoding as microdots various pieces of material which they then sent to their colleagues in Russia, as part of a Soviet espionage network known as the Portland spy ring, which had penetrated Britain's Royal Navy.

== Productions ==
The original West End production, starring Judi Dench and her husband, Michael Williams, as the Jacksons, opened on 26 October 1983 at the Lyric Theatre, where it ran for nearly a year. Dench won the Laurence Olivier Award as Best Actress for her performance. Later in the run, Mary Miller replaced Dench.

After five previews, the Broadway production opened on 7 February 1985 at the Royale Theatre, where it ran for 120 performances. The cast included Rosemary Harris, George N. Martin, and Tracy Pollan as the Jacksons, Dana Ivey and Colin Fox as the Cohens, and Patrick McGoohan as Stewart. Both Harris and McGoohan were nominated for a Drama Desk Award, with Harris winning for Outstanding Actress in a Play. Harris was also nominated for a Tony Award.

In 1987, Whitemore wrote a draft of an adaptation of his play for an American television production on Hallmark Hall of Fame on CBS. He departed the production and the shooting script was written by Jeffrey Sweet who was billed as "creative consultant". Whitemore was unhappy with this version and exercised the right to have the script credited to a pseudonym, Ralph Gallup. Directed by Anthony Page, the acclaimed film starred Ellen Burstyn, Alan Bates, Teri Garr, and Daniel Benzali. It received three Emmy Award nominations, for Outstanding Drama/Comedy Special, Outstanding Lead Actress in a Miniseries or a Special (Burstyn), and Outstanding Writing in a Miniseries or a Special.

Cesear's Forum, Cleveland's minimalist theatre company, presented the play at Kennedy's Down Under, Playhouse Square in a November/December 2006 production. The cast: Julia Kolibab, Paul Floriano, Juliette Regnier. The ensemble also included Mary Alice Beck, Steven Hoffman, Tom Jessup, Alanna Romansky and Jennifer Mae Hoffman.

In November 2025, Martin George directed a version of the play for the Waterbeach Theatre Company. The production ran for three nights.

== Awards and nominations ==
=== Original Broadway production ===
Year	Award	Category	Nominee	Result
1985	Tony Award	Best Actress in a Play	Rosemary Harris	Nominated
1985	Outer Critics Circle Award	Outstanding Actress in a Play	Rosemary Harris	Won
1985	Drama Desk Award	Outstanding Actress in a Play	Rosemary Harris	Won
1985	Drama Desk Award	Outstanding Actor in a Play	Patrick McGoohan	Nominated
