= Lovely, Still =

- Theatrical release poster
- Directed by: Nicholas Fackler
- Written by: Nicholas Fackler; Tim Kasher
- Produced by: Dana Altman; James Lawler; Jay Van Hoy; Lars Knudsen
- Starring: Martin Landau; Ellen Burstyn; Adam Scott; Elizabeth Banks
- Cinematography: Sean Kirby
- Edited by: Douglas Crise
- Music by: Mike Mogis; Nate Walcott
- Production company: North Sea Films
- Distributed by: Monterey Media
- Release dates: September 5, 2008 (TIFF); September 10, 2010 (United States)
- Country: United States
- Budget: $5 million

Lovely, Still is a 2008 American romantic drama film directed by Nik Fackler. It stars Martin Landau, Ellen Burstyn, Adam Scott, and Elizabeth Banks. Filming took place in Omaha, Nebraska. The film premiered at the Toronto International Film Festival in 2008 and received a limited theatrical release two years later on September 10, 2010.

== Plot ==
Lonely Robert Malone falls in love with Mary, the mother of his neighbor Alex. With the help of his boss Mike, Robert decides to spend Christmas with someone for the first time. Over a period of a few days and with the "co-conspiratorial help" from the grocery store manager, as a couple they enjoy several activities leading up to Christmas, including things like a carriage ride, a shopping spree, attending a musical performance together, and a party. At the party, Robert mistakenly accuses another older man of being the rotten, no good husband who had left Mary before. As the story progresses, we begin to understand that Mary knows a lot more and is much more concerned about making Robert happy day-by-day than might be otherwise expected for a senior couple, including moments of quiet intimacy. As the film draws to a close, we find out that Alex, Mike, Mary, and even the "alleged" boyfriend are all part of the story, as it is Robert's condition of Alzheimer's / dementia taking him away from them for days at a time, leading to a very sweet ending.

== Cast ==
- Martin Landau as Robert Malone
- Ellen Burstyn as Mary
- Adam Scott as Mike
- Elizabeth Banks as Alex

== Reception ==
On Rotten Tomatoes, the film holds an approval rating of 73% based on 22 reviews.

Landau and Burstyn received praise for their performances. Jennie Punter of The Globe and Mail wrote, "There are moments during Lovely, Still when it feels like you're trapped with Martin Landau and Ellen Burstyn in a kitschy musical Christmas snowglobe that someone keeps shaking", but "Landau and Burstyn deliver beautiful, nuanced performances, creating a real and captivating onscreen chemistry. It’s a testament to their talent that you find yourself slowly drawn into the bubble (make that snowglobe) of Robert and Mary’s budding romance, as the music swells, the snowflakes flutter down and Christmas Day draws nearer."

== Remake ==
The film was remade in South Korea as Salut d'Amour (2015).

== Accolades ==
In 2010, Lovely, Still received a nomination for Best Actress (Ellen Burstyn) at the AARP Movies for Grownups Awards.

Lovely, Still was nominated for Outstanding Achievement in Casting – Low Budget Feature (Drama/Comedy) in 2011 by the Casting Society of America.

Lovely, Still was also nominated for Best First Screenplay at the 2011 Film Independent Spirit Awards.
