= Media depictions of body shape =

Body shape refers to the many physical attributes of the human body that make up its appearance, including size and countenance. Body shape has come to imply not only sexual/reproductive ability, but wellness and fitness. In the West, slenderness is associated with happiness, success, youth, and social acceptability. Being overweight is associated with laziness. The media promote a weight-conscious standard for women more often than for men. Deviance from these norms results in social consequences. The media perpetuate this ideal in various ways, particularly glorifying and focusing on thin actors and actresses, models, and other public figures while avoiding the use or image of overweight individuals. This thin ideal represents less than 15% of the American population.

== Magazines ==
It has been stated that the increase in eating disorders over the past several decades has coincided with an overall decrease (pound-wise) in women's ideal body weight portrayed by the mass media. A group of researchers examined the magazines Cosmopolitan, Glamour, Mademoiselle, and Vogue from 1959 to 1999. Fashion models became increasingly thinner during the 1980s and 1990s, making the thin ideal even more difficult for women to achieve. Photos depicting the models' entire bodies significantly increased in number from the 1960s to the 1990s. From 1995 to 1999 models were dressed in far more revealing outfits than they were from 1959 to 1963.

Women's magazines have been criticized for their conflicting messages, with an emphasis on food, cooking, child rearing, and entertaining. Seventy-five percent of women's magazines contain at least one ad or article about how to alter one's appearance through cosmetic surgery, diet, or exercise. Twenty-five percent of the women's magazines surveyed included tips for dieting or messages about weight loss. Many women's magazines focus on how to lead a better life by improving physical appearance. Megenta magazine released an article on "How to dress for your body type" giving tips and tricks to look the best in an outfit while striving to encourage women to feel comfortable in their skin. Men's magazines provide information about hobbies, activities, and entertainment for men to better their lives.

Much of the research about how the media affects body image examines the change in models and magazine articles over time. Garner, Garfinkel, Schwartz, and Thompson paid particular attention to the difference in body shape of Playboy centerfolds over a 20-year period. They found that over the years, the body mass, bust, and hip measurements decreased; however, the height increased. They also determined that the Playboy centerfolds were 13%–19% lower than the normal body weight for women of their age (Cusumano, Thompson 1997). Other studies found that over the years, magazines like Seventeen, YM, and Cosmopolitan all had an increase in articles about diet and exercise. Anderson and DiDomenico (1992) compared women's and men's popular magazines and found that diet and exercise articles appeared more than 10 times as much in women's magazines than men's.

== Models ==
Modeling and fashion industries have come under fire in the 21st century for embracing and promoting an ultra-thin appearance, giving "unhealthy stigma". According to a data research done by Might Goods using 3,000 models from 20 leading model agencies, 94% of the models are underweight. In addition, in a study conducted in 1992 by Jennifer Brenner and Joseph Cunningham, it was observed that the majority of female models were underweight. The average American female fashion model begins working in the modeling business between the ages of 13 and 17 years old. The average female model in the United States weighs between 90 and 120 lb (40.82–54.43 kg), and stands at between 5 ft 8 in (172.72 cm) and 5 ft 11 in (180.34 cm) tall. In comparison, according to the Center for Disease Control (CDC), the average weight of an American woman is 168.5 lb (76.43 kg), and the average height for American women is 5 ft 4 in (162.56 cm). According to the AMA (American Medical Association), thin models on the catwalk as well as social media and fashion photography lead to unrealistic body expectations, which in turn could lead to eating disorders and other emotional problems. With the mass advertisement promoting thin body, plastic surgery and cosmetic surgery, women and young girls are being bombarded with this very idea of achieving thin body. This issue is being control by some countries such as Israel and France in which they regulate the body mass indexes of models and let the public know whether the ad images is manipulated.

The dictionary definition of photoshopping, is "[the] alter[ation] [of] (a digital image) with Photoshop software or other image-editing software[,] especially in a way that distorts reality (as for deliberately deceptive purposes)". Aerie, the lingerie line for American Eagle, began the campaign Aerie Real, in which models were no longer photoshopped. A 2016 study showed that some women showed a smaller decrease in body satisfaction when seeing the photos of women untouched, in comparison to the greater decrease in body satisfaction when seeing previous photos that were retouched. Many well-known magazines have been called out for photoshopping, a few examples being AdWeek, InStyle, Modeliste Magazine, and Fashion Magazine. Celebrities have recently commented on changes that were made to their photos by such magazines. In 2015, Zendaya, an actor, singer and dancer who was 21 years old at the time, posted two pictures side by side of her magazine photoshoot, calling out the changes that were made by the magazine, Modeliste Magazine. She stated, "These are the things that make women self-conscious… that create the unrealistic ideals of beauty that we have".

Victoria's Secret puts on an annually televised Fashion Show, in which its models walk down the runway in lingerie and the latest releases for PINK, a brand aimed at high school and college-age consumers. In the televised showing, the models usually include how they prepared for the Fashion Show by showing clips of working out and dieting to prepare for the big day. A study published in 2013 analyzed the responses viewers were tweeting during the showing. Viewers discussed food, weight, eating disorders, and self-harm. The results of this study showed that vulnerable viewers could experience negative affect, or even engage in harmful behaviors, during or after viewing the show or others like it. In 2019, Victoria's Secret canceled its runway show amid declining ratings and later ditched the concept of the Victoria's Secret Angels, saying the marketing strategy was no longer "culturally relevant." In 2021, the company announced plans to revive the show, but without the Angels.

== Television ==
In 28 primetime situational comedies analyzed by researchers in 2002, 33% of the central female characters were below average weight. As the thinness of a female character increased, the number of compliments she received from men did as well. Research has shown that below-average weight female characters are overrepresented, while above-average weight female characters are underrepresented in situational comedies as compared to the norms of the US population. Primetime television shows that appeal to a primarily female audience, such as Friends or Ally McBeal are helmed by young, attractive, and thin women. Extremely skinny or emaciated women are shown on fashion industry related shows, like House of Style.

Male characters often negatively comment on average and above average weight females' body shapes and weights and audiences usually react by laughing. Male characters are not immune to unfair representation. 33% of male characters were below average weight and 13% were above average weight. By comparison, approximately 30% of men in the US are overweight. In 2003 a study was conducted on ten top-rated American primetime fictional television programs. 33% of female television characters were underweight. Of 1018 major television characters, 14% of females and 24% of males were overweight or obese, less than half their percentages in the general population.

A study was done of 10 primetime television programs on each of the six major TV networks (ABC, CBS, Fox, UPN, NBC, and WB) with the largest Nielsen audience ratings during the 1999–2000 season. Of the 1018 characters on all of the shows, 14% of females and 24% of males were overweight or obese. These numbers represent less than half the percentage of overweight or obese males and females in the general population. Overweight female characters were less likely to be considered attractive, display physical affection, or connect with romantic partners. Overweight male characters were less likely to interact with friends or romantic partners and less likely to talk about dating. Overweight male characters were often shown eating. These statistics are representative of the fat stigmatization present in many US television programs. The small number of fat female television characters that do exist are consistently depicted in relation to thinner, highly sexualized female characters. These characters are used as props, against which thinner women are compared, judged and valued.

A study in Fiji showed that the introduction of western television had a detrimental effect on young women's perceptions and eating behaviors. Three-fourths of the girls in the study reported feeling fat after prolonged exposure to western television.

In 2007, analysts sampled 135 scenes featuring overweight individuals from popular television programs and movies and coded for anti-fat humor. The majority of anti-fat humor found was verbal and directed at the individual in their presence, with no regard for their feelings. Self-deprecating fat comments were much less common than those about or directed at another person. Male characters were three times more likely to engage in fat commentary than female characters. Media programs containing fat stigmatization content often are popular and have high ratings, suggesting that the general public finds it acceptable to overlook such remarks in the context of the story.

According to Renee Hobbs, associate professor of communications at Temple University, the average teen girl gets about 180 minutes of media exposure daily and only about 10 minutes of parental interaction a day. Girls often take drastic measures in an attempt to become like the media images they view. Many end up with very low self-esteem and dangerous eating disorders. Elissa Gittes, a pediatrician in the division of adolescent medicine at Children's Hospital of Pittsburgh says, "We're seeing girls at younger ages starting to be dissatisfied with their bodies, proactively trying to change them, and feeling like they need to emulate something different than what their bodies can do."

== Video games ==
In 2009 a content analysis of 150 top-selling video games found that games rated for children depicted female characters as significantly thinner than female characters in games rated for adults. Females in video games had significantly larger heads, but smaller chest sizes, waists, and hips than the average American woman. In 2008, a study showed that after playing video games, both female and male college-aged participants had significantly lower body esteem.

The muscular male body in mass media and video is the cause of many symptoms such as body dissatisfaction and body esteem. In the United States, adolescent boys aged 13–18 spend nine hours on average playing video games. Exposure to these unattainable avatars within video games lead to higher body dissatisfaction, and in turn lead to many other social and psychology problems. Garner reported that 41% of teenage boys 13–19 years old were found to be dissatisfied with their overall body.

Research done by Zeely Sylvia from Bridgewater State University found that players who played a game with a character who had a more average body size and shape would display less body esteem concern than players who played with an unrealistic muscular body character. The research concludes that muscularity concerns play a large role in the construct of male body image, and may have a substantial influence on male body esteem.

== Non-fiction media ==
In 2001, the British newspaper The Independent wrote about the silhouette of American TV stars like Calista Flockhart and Sarah Jessica Parker and compared it to that of the women in pop group Destiny's Child saying, "The lollipop silhouette long-favored by the female stars of American sitcoms, which involves disproportionately large heads wobbling atop stick-thin bodies does not say rich and it doesn't say clever. It says take me to a clinic. The New Athleticism, however, sends out a rather different set of messages: strong, confident, independent woman."

Surgeon General Richard Carmona speaks of obesity as the "terror within" and says "unless we do something about it, the magnitude of the dilemma will dwarf 9–11 or any other terrorist attempt." The news media has been criticized for its alarmist and overly dramatized reporting on the issue of weight and obesity. By using keywords such as "war" or "epidemic" in their reporting, the news media attracts greater attention to the issue. News reports likely reinforce the stigma of fat bodies, linking them to disease and likening fatness to a health behavior instead of an unalterable trait.

In September 2011 nationally syndicated columnist Michael Kinsley, the founding editor of Slate magazine, wrote harshly critical remarks about New Jersey governor Chris Christie and his weight. Kinsley wrote "New Jersey Governor Chris Christie cannot be president: He is just too fat . . .why should Christie's weight be more than we can bear in a president? Why should it even be a legitimate issue if he runs? One reason is that a presidential candidate should be judged on behavior and character . . . Perhaps Christie is the one to help us get our national appetites under control. But it would help if he got his own under control first."

== Children's media ==
A content analysis done of children's videos and books found that 72% of videos and 7.5% of books emphasized physical attractiveness. In 60% of videos, a character's love for another depends on physical appearance and attractiveness. Examples include Cinderella, where the prince invites maidens to the ball to select a bride and Beauty and the Beast, where the Beast falls in love with Belle purely based upon her physical appearance. In 72% of videos and 10% of books characters with thin bodies have desirable traits. In 84% of videos and 10% of books female physical attractiveness is associated with kindness, sociability, and happiness. While 60% of videos portray female thinness, only 32% show male muscularity. No physical attraction is shown between a slender character and an obese character, with the exception of Beauty and the Beast.

A study published in 2010 involved one hundred and twenty-one girls aged 3–6 to determine the effects of brief exposure to appearance-related media on young girls' body image. The exposure ended up not affecting body dissatisfaction. Although nearly all the girls did like how they looked 1/3 would change one physical thing and half were worried about becoming fat.

In 64% of children's videos and 20% of books, obesity is related to negative traits. Obese characters are often shown as evil, unfriendly, cruel, and unattractive. Ursula from The Little Mermaid is an obese, unattractive octopian. In 40% of videos and 20% of books, at least one obese character is disliked by others. Obese characters are shown thinking about food or depicted in setting related to food in 52% of videos and 20% of books. Children's media is perpetuating the "what is beautiful is good" stereotype through its portrayals of thin and obese characters.

== Social media ==
Social media consists of websites like Twitter, Tumblr, Instagram, Pinterest and Facebook enabling users to produce and share content. Thinspiration images that promote the idealization of thinness and pro-eating disorder websites are becoming increasingly more prevalent throughout social media. Pro-eating disorder (i.e. pro-ana and pro-bulimia) websites are forms of social media where individuals can share advice and images that encourage their peers to engage in eating disorder behaviors. These websites have been shown to have deleterious effects because they communicate to the viewer that the thin ideal is something that is not only attainable but also necessary. Women are more likely to compare themselves online when they feel the need to improve their appearance. Women with low self-esteem are more likely to feel dissatisfied after comparing themselves to images on social and women who struggle with preexisting eating disorders may exacerbate them through social media-fueled body comparison. A study on college women in the US concluded that women who spent a significant amount of time on Facebook had increased body dissatisfaction.

Whether positive or negative, other social media platforms have also shown to have an impact on their users. In an online experiment of US women, it was found that Pinterest users that followed fitness boards were "more likely to engage in extreme weight-loss behaviors." It was also found that these boards promoted a positive correlation between social comparison, female ideal body typing, and extreme weight loss behaviors.

=== Impact on self esteem ===
Research has been conducted to examine the relationship between social media and level of self-esteem in adolescents. Thai and colleagues conducted a report titled "Reducing Social Media Use Improves Appearance and Weight Esteem in Youth With Emotional Distress" in 2023. Thai and colleagues recognize the potential of social medias as being a valuable tool, but they caution excessive usage can lead to diminished self-esteem and increased body dissatisfaction levels. Participants were college aged women and men, who were either allowed to use social media as normal or had been restricted to one hour of social media usage a day on platforms like Snapchat, Instagram, and TikTok. Participants responded to statements such as "I'm pretty happy about the way I look" and "I am satisfied with my weight". Ultimately, results showed that those who spent an hour a day on social media had increased levels of appearance esteem and less social comparison levels in comparison to those who used social media as normal in the study.

=== Desire to alter the body ===
Additionally, mental health and medical professionals have demonstrated that those who are continuously exposed to advertisements are more willing to engage in appearance altering practices. These practices include disordered eating habits, such as bulimia or anorexia nervosa, significant time exercising, cosmetic procedures, and self-harm. Ferdousi and colleagues conducted a report titled "Through Thick and Thin: Exposure to Instagram Advertisements and Willingness to Engage in Appearance-Altering Practices" to understand the influence of media and body image. As most know, thin models are commonly used in advertising in comparison to thinner models, because thinness is seen as the ideal. Continuous exposure to a dramatized thin ideal will result in lower satisfaction with one's body. However, Instagram has made effort to promote brands with curvier bodies to users. In this study, two models were tested: a preference for a thin or curvy body shape, and if this model can be expanded to include physical appearance comparisons and body dissatisfaction as mediators to take body modifying actions. The women in the study were not previously diagnosed with eating disorders or body dysmorphia and spend time regularly on Instagram. Ultimately, results showed a significant positive relation to being exposed to thin and curvy models and a willingness to engage in actions to be thinner or curvier. White women prefer thinner frames while black and Latina women prefer curvier ideals.

== Lasting effects on viewers ==
"A study of 6,928 girls ages 9 to 14 years old found that the desire to emulate the appearance of females on television, in movies, and in magazines was predictive of beginning purging behavior at least on a monthly basis." Approximately 92% of women feel pressure to conform to the standards of beauty which the media perpetuates. After viewing images of women with "ideal" body weights, 95% of women overestimate their body size and 40% overestimate the size of their waist, hips, cheeks, or thighs. Those with eating disorders, such as anorexia nervosa or bulimia nervosa, show a significant increase in overestimation of body size after viewing such images. Similarly, males who are exposed to body-related advertisements show an increase in body dissatisfaction and depression. Men shown advertisements containing images of exceptionally muscular men were shown to be dissatisfied with their own musculature, not their body fat, after viewing such advertisements. This finding is consistent with previous evidence that states muscularity is more important than body fat in men's body satisfaction.

The correlation between media image and body image has been proven; in one study, among European-American and African-American girls ages 7–12, greater overall television exposure predicted both a thinner ideal adult body shape and a higher level of disordered eating one year later. Adolescent girls are the most strongly affected demographic; "More and more 12-year-old girls are going on diets because they believe what you weigh determines your worth," Cutler observed. "When all you see is a body type that only two percent of the population has, it's difficult to remember what's real and what's reasonable to expect of yourself and everyone else."

Put simply, the beauty ideal in American culture is: thin. "Large populations of 'average' girls do not demonstrate clinically diagnosable eating disorders—pathologies that the culture marks as extreme and unhealthy—but rather an entirely normative obsession with body shape and size," Cutler said. "This ongoing concern is accepted as a completely normal and even inevitable part of being a modern girl. I think we need to change that."

Young adults and teens are very vulnerable to addiction to social media usage because they do not know different life, world, and functioning without it. "Teens and young adults are considered particularly at risk. They're a generation raised on the internet, social media, and digital technology so these things are integral, indispensable parts of their lives. Young people also are impressionable, eager for acceptance, and relatively inexperienced, which can cloud judgment."

Several studies have shown that race and ethnicity can affect the way women perceive body image. Women of color often have different perceptions of body image than white women—a difference that may be linked to cultural differences such as family and community experiences and racial or ethnic pride, and other differences such as childhood influences (e.g., school environment). Ultimately, these differences may have lasting effects on the ways in which white and non-white women are affected by media depictions and cultural ideals of body image and beauty.

Lovejoy finds in her research—which compares the perceptions of body image and eating disorders in black and white women through a literature review—that the strategies (e.g., resistance to mainstream beauty ideals) that black women use to challenge mainstream depictions of female bodies and develop positive self-valuations are often strengthened through support from other black women. These same types of supportive communities were not replicated in the same way for white women in the literature. Lovejoy argues that this difference in support can influence the way black and white women are affected by damaging ideals of body image and beauty. Namely, black women may be less susceptible to these damaging ideals than white women as a result of strong support within their communities.

However, such research does not suggest that black women are not affected by damaging ideals of body image and beauty. Maya A. Poran finds that "[c]ontrary to popular theories that propose that Black women are protected by a 'Black Culture' that buffers them from negative effects of body representations—thereby leaving them with higher body esteem," black women in her study did experience "(1) pressures to be thin, (2) pressures from the preferences of men of diverse ethnicities, (3) competition with other Black women in the realms of beauty, and (4) a strong sense of being misrepresented by media images of thin Black women." Therefore, while it is important to recognize the contribution of supportive communities to the positive self-valuation that some black women may experience, it is important that this not obscure the damaging impact that harmful ideals of body image and beauty may have on black women.

== Potential Solutions ==
To begin, acts have been proposed to legislatures in an effort to restrict the power corporations have on body image and disordered eating. Kay Khan's "An Act relative to mental health promotion through realistic advertising images" attempts to encourage guidelines to be developed in advertising. By incentivizing corporations to not participate in altering images of the models, tax credits will be given when using realistic models. Those who pledge to not alter the models' skin tone, texture or body shape will reap the benefits. A "qualifying business" is one that generates less than $100,000 in yearly revenue and is engaged in the production and sale of cosmetics, products, or personal hygiene. Further, the tax credit is equal to one per cent of the costs of media purchases related with an ad promotion but cannot exceed $10,000 a year.

Another bill was introduced in the United Kingdom, called the "Digitally Altered Images Bill" presented by Dr Luke Evans in 2022. The bill is split into five sections: principles for the use of digitally altered body images, approval of self-regulatory measures, statutory measures in the absence of approval of self-regulatory measures, commencement and expiry, and extent. The first section claims advertisers and publishers must display a logo in situations where a body has been fundamentally changed using digital means, and the logo must be recognizable. The second section recognizes the House of Commons approval of the measure. Third, this section claims the Secretary of State must make provisions about the use of digitally altered images. The fourth and fifth sections examine when each section will be enacted and where it extends to. For instance, section 2 expires at the end of the period of one year, and the act extends to England and Wales, Scotland, and Northern Ireland.

== Importance of promoting appropriate ads ==
The influence of social media on body image is undeniable, as shown by the research above. While social media can aid in connecting with others and allowing for self-expression, there is an emphasis on unrealistic standards for body shape. Thin models are often further enhanced by corporations, presenting a "perfect" woman to individuals of all ages creating damaging effects to one's mental and physical health. Understanding these complexities is crucial for healthcare professionals and policymakers to develop strategies for mitigating the harmful impacts of media and body image. In the future, it is imperative a culture of digital literacy, advocating for responsible ads, and educating the youth on what a healthy body is, are essential in promoting a better digital world.

== See also ==
- Anti-fat bias
- Body image
- Body shape
- Eating disorder
- Female body shape
- Figure rating scale
- Physical attractiveness
- Self image
- Sex in advertising
- Sizeism
