= Obesity social stigma in television =

Social stigma of obesity

The social stigma of obesity, is defined as the systemic oppression of and discrimination against people who may be considered overweight, obese, or fat by medical standards. Fatphobia exists in many forms and presents itself in both institutional and interpersonal circumstances. According to numerous academics, fatphobia or general anti-fat bias is common and pervasive. Fatphobia negatively impacts the attitudes and behaviours of individuals towards those considered to be overweight or obese. Employment, relationships, and medical care are some facets of daily living that are all known to be negatively impacted by fatphobic rhetoric or anti-fat assumptions. Fatphobia is produced and spread in many ways, including through advertising and popular media such as television shows. According to a number of scholars, television shows in North America both underrepresent and misrepresent fat people which (re)produces fatphobic rhetoric.

== Lack of representation ==
A number of studies conducted from 1980 and onwards have found that thin people are generally overrepresented in North American television shows, and fat or overweight people are generally underrepresented in North American television shows. This phenomenon is commonly attributed to what some refer to as the “thin ideal”. Some scholars explain the thin ideal as a societal preference for thin bodies, and consequently a societal aversion to larger bodies. Scholars note that the "thin ideal" most commonly impacts women, but does impact men as well. A study conducted in 1980 found that only a small portion of actors on prime-time television shows were fat or overweight, while the majority were either thin or “average” sized. This study found that 12% of actors represented in prime-time television shows in 1980 were considered fat or overweight, with a majority of that percentage being fat or overweight men and a minority of that percentage being fat or overweight women. A 2003 study found similar results, and stated that both fat or overweight women and men were underrepresented in prime-time television shows. According to this study, overweight or fat women accounted for 14% of actors on prime-time television shows, while overweight or fat men accounted for 24% of actors on prime-time television shows. It has been noted that these percentages are not representative of the obesity rates in North America. As of 2009, overweight or obese people accounted for 67% of the American population.

== Negative Stereotypes ==
Studies have found that when individuals considered to be overweight, obese, or fat are present within television shows, their characters are often portrayed through the use of negative stereotypes. Some scholars suggest that negative stereotypes of fat or overweight people within television shows results in those same stereotypes being attributed to fat or overweight people in real life. Joan C. Chrisler and Angela Barney suggest that negative stereotypes within the media even impacts the attitudes of health care professionals when dealing with overweight or obese patients. Common stereotypes of fat people portrayed within television shows include those related to gluttony, insecurity, laziness, sexual undesirability, and physical unattractiveness.
