= Self-image =

Mental picture of self that comes from different sources

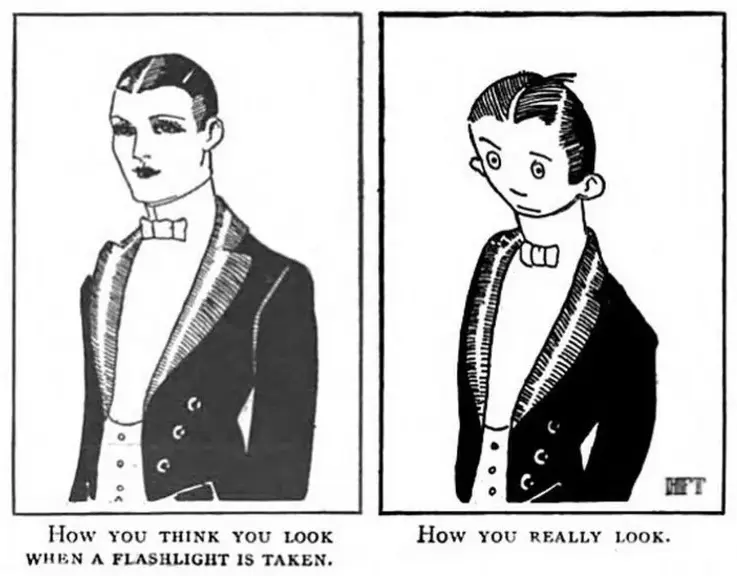
A 1921 cartoon representation of a person's self-image compared to their reality.

Self-image is the mental picture, generally of a kind that is quite resistant to change, that depicts not only details that are potentially available to an objective investigation by others (height, weight, hair color, etc.), but also items that have been learned by persons about themselves, either from personal experiences or by internalizing the judgments of others. In some formulations, it is a component of self-concept.

Self-image may consist of six types:

1. Self-image resulting from how an individual sees oneself.
2. Self-image resulting from how others see the individual.
3. Self-image resulting from how the individual perceives the individual seeing oneself.
4. Self-image resulting from how the individual perceives how others see the individual.
5. Self-image resulting from how others perceive how the individual sees oneself.
6. Self-image resulting from how others perceive how others see the individual.

These six types may or may not be an accurate representation of the person. All, some, or none of them may be true.

A more technical term for self-image that is commonly used by social and cognitive psychologists is self-schema. Like any schema, self-schemas store information and influence the way we think and remember. For example, research indicates that information which refers to the self is preferentially encoded and recalled in memory tests, a phenomenon known as "self-referential encoding". Self-schemas are also considered the traits people use to define themselves, they draw information about the self into a coherent scheme.

== Poor self-image ==
Poor self-image may be the result of accumulated criticisms that the person collected as a child which have led to damaging their own view of themselves. Children in particular are vulnerable to accepting negative judgments from authority figures because they have yet to develop competency in evaluating such comments. Also, adolescents are highly targeted to suffer from poor body-image issues. Individuals who already exhibit a low sense of self-worth may be vulnerable to develop social disorders.

Negative self-images can arise from a variety of factors. A prominent factor, however, is personality type. Perfectionists, high achievers and those with "type A" personalities seem to be prone to having negative self-images. This is because such people constantly set the standard for success high above a reasonable, attainable level. Thus, they are constantly disappointed in this "failure."

Another factor that contributes to a negative self-image is the beauty values of the society in which a person lives. In the American society, a popular beauty ideal is a slimness. Oftentimes, girls believe that they do not measure up to society's "thin" standards, which leads to their having a negative self-image.

== Maintenance ==
When people are in the position of evaluating others, self-image maintenance processes can lead to a more negative evaluation depending on the self-image of the evaluator. That is to say stereotyping and prejudice may be the way individuals maintain their self-image. When individuals evaluate a member of a stereotyped group, they are less likely to evaluate that person negatively if their self-images had been bolstered through a self-affirmation procedure, and they are more likely to evaluate that person stereotypically if their self-images have been threatened by negative feedback. Individuals may restore their self-esteem by derogating the member of a stereotyped group.

Fein and Spencer (1997) conducted a study on Self-image Maintenance and Discriminatory Behavior. This study showed evidence that increased prejudice can result from a person's need to redeem a threatened positive perception of the self. The aim of the study was to test whether a particular threat to the self would instigate increased stereotyping and lead to actual discriminatory behavior or tendencies towards a member of a "negatively" stereotyped group. The study began when Fein and Spencer gave participants an ostensible test of intelligence. Some of them received negative feedback, and others, positive and supportive feedback. In the second half of the experiment, the participants were asked to evaluate another person who either belonged to a negatively stereotyped group, or one who did not. The results of the experiment showed that the participants who had previously received unfavorable comments on their test, evaluated the target of the negatively stereotyped group in a more antagonistic or opposing way, than the participants who were given excellent reports on their intelligence test. They suggested that the negative feedback on the test threatened the participants' self-image and they evaluated the target in a more negative manner, all in efforts to restore their own self-esteem.

A present study extends the studies of Fein and Spencer in which the principal behavior examined was avoidance behavior. In the study, Macrae et al. (2004) found that participants that had a salient negative stereotype of "skinheads" attached, physically placed themselves further from a skinhead target compared to those in which the stereotype was not as apparent. Therefore, greater salience of a negative stereotype led participants to show more stereotype-consistent behavior towards the target.

== Residual ==
Residual self-image is the concept that individuals tend to think of themselves as projecting a certain physical appearance, or certain position of social entitlement, or lack thereof. The term was used at least as early as 1968, but was popularized in fiction by the Matrix series, where persons who existed in a digitally created world would subconsciously maintain the physical appearance that they had become accustomed to projecting.

== Victimisation ==
Victims of abuse and manipulation often get trapped into a self-image of victimisation. The psychological profile of victimisation includes a pervasive sense of helplessness, passivity, loss of control, pessimism, negative thinking, strong feelings of self-guilt, shame, self-blame and depression. This way of thinking can lead to hopelessness and despair.

== Children's disparity ==
Self-image disparity was found to be positively related to chronological age (CA) and intelligence. Two factors thought to increase concomitantly with maturity were capacity for guilt and ability for cognitive differentiation. However, males had larger self-image disparities than females, Caucasians had larger disparities and higher ideal self-images than African Americans, and socioeconomic status (SES) affected self-images differentially for the 2nd and 5th graders.

=== Strengtheners ===
A child's self-awareness of who they are differentiates into three categories around the age of five: their social self, academic persona, and physical attributes. Several ways to strengthen a child's self-image include communication, reassurance, support of hobbies, and finding good role models.

== Evolved awareness in mirror ==
In the earliest stages of development, infants are not aware that images in mirrors are themselves. Research was done on 88 children between 3 and 24 months. Their behaviors were observed before a mirror. The results indicated that children's awareness of self-image followed three major age-related sequences:

- From about 6 through 12 months of age, the first prolonged and repeated reaction of an infant to their mirror image is that of a sociable “playmate”.
- In the second year of life, wariness and withdrawal appeared; self-admiring and embarrassed behavior accompanied those avoidance behaviors starting at 14 months, and was shown by 75% of the subjects after 20 months of age.
- During the last part of the second year of life, from 20 to 24 months of age, 65% of the subjects demonstrated recognition of their mirror images.

== Women's sexual behavior ==
A magazine survey that included items about body image, self-image, and sexual behaviors was completed by 3,627 women. The study found that overall self-image and body image are significant predictors of sexual activity. Women who were more satisfied with body image reported more sexual activity, orgasm, and initiating sex, greater comfort undressing in front of their partner, having sex with the lights on, trying new sexual behaviors (e.g. anal sex), and pleasing their partner sexually than those dissatisfied. Positive body image was inversely related to self-consciousness and importance of physical attractiveness, and directly related to relationships with others and overall satisfaction.

== Men's sexual behavior ==
An article published in the journal, Psychology of Men & Masculinity, analyzed how (perceived) penile size affected body satisfaction in males. Based on the responses received from 110 heterosexual individuals (67 men; 43 women) to questions on the matter, the article concluded:

Men showed significant dissatisfaction with penile size, despite perceiving themselves to be of average size. Importantly, there were significant relationships between penile dissatisfaction and comfort with others seeing their penis, and with likelihood of seeking medical advice with regard to penile and/or sexual function. Given the negative consequences of low body satisfaction and the importance of early intervention in sexually related illnesses (e.g., testicular cancer), it is imperative that attention be paid to male body dissatisfaction.

== See also ==
- Acquiescence
- Body image
- Body schema
- Culture of poverty
- Dunning–Kruger effect
- End-of-history illusion
- Face (self image)
- Fear of negative evaluation
- Figure rating scale
- Ideas of fairness
- Identity formation
- Identity performance
- Inferiority complex
- The Honest Body Project
- Positive mental attitude
- Psychological projection
- Self-concealment
- Self-concept
- Self-efficacy
- Self-esteem
- Self (psychology)
- Self-schema
- Style of life
- Victimology
