= Anti-fatphobia NGOs in the United States =

Group of non-governmental organizations

An anti-fatphobia organization is an organization that works to address the social stigma of obesity. Anti-fatphobia organizations typically define themselves by their desire to end fatphobia in whichever contexts they focus on. Anti-fatphobia organizations in the United States are closely tied to the fat acceptance movement with anti-fatphobia activism in general, which begun around the 1960s. The fat acceptance movement can be described as a movement which centres fat people in order to address the oppression they face in society for being fat. The fat acceptance movement calls for societal recognition of a need for systemic change. Anti-fatphobia organizations often take an intersectional approach, and address how fatness is experienced at varying intersections of identity. In the United States, there are two main anti-fatphobia organizations. These organizations are NOLOSE, or the National Organization of Lesbians of Every Size, and NAAFA, or the National Association to Advance Fat Acceptance.

== The National Organization of Lesbians of Every Size (NOLOSE) ==
The National Organization of Lesbians of Every Size was founded in the late 1990s. While the organization was originally founded by and for lesbians, it has grown much larger since the 1990s, and now includes many people including fat people within the LGBTQIA+ community and their allies. The National Organization of Lesbians of Every Size hosts a workshop each year where fat people and their allies are welcomed to come together to discuss topics pertaining to fat liberation and acceptance, the future of the organization, and more. The organization also hosts fundraisers in order to raise money to support their conferences, for scholarships to attend their conferences, and more. The conferences run by the National Organization of Lesbians of Every Size are a place for a grassroots form of knowledge production. Lots of information created by and for fat people have come from the National Organization of Lesbians of Every Size conferences, including the term "Super fat", which is a section of the "fat spectrum" or "fategories", explained by Linda of the Fluffy Kitten Party blog. In addition to their annual conferences, the National Organization of Lesbians of Every Size also hosts community-building events throughout the United States, such as roller skating nights and a drag queen night.

== The National Association to Advance Fat Acceptance (NAAFA) ==
The National Association to Advance Fat Acceptance is based in New York City, New York, and was founded in the late 1960s. The organization is composed of fat people and allies who work towards ending oppression of fat people. NAAFA makes it clear that its intention is aligned with fat liberation and recognizing the rights of fat people, rather than the promotion of obesity like many critics believe. The National Association to Advance Fat Acceptance is entirely volunteer-run, and is committed to societal change that eliminates all body-centred discrimination, including fatphobia, sizeism, racism, and more. The National Association to Advance Fat Acceptance creates programs, brochures, and toolkits, hosts webinars, and grants funding for small-scale projects all with the goal of de-stigmatizing fatness and ending discrimination against fat people.
