= Sizeism =

Prejudice or discrimination based on size

Sizeism, weightism/heightism or size discrimination is unjust or prejudicial treatment directed at people based on their size.

== Discrimination ==
This type of discrimination can take a number of forms, ranging from refusing to hire someone because they are considered to be too short or too tall, to treating overweight and underweight individuals with disdain.

There are not currently any specific anti-discrimination laws to prohibit sizeism, despite the issue being extremely prevalent. Sizeist stereotypes (such as "overweight people are lazy" or "underweight people starve themselves") are often ingrained in modern society.

In the US, the list of anti-discrimination acts does not explicitly include sizeism as an offense (though "any other factor unrelated to merit" is included).

The Equal Employment Opportunity Commission website states:

Height and weight requirements tend to disproportionately limit the employment opportunities of some protected groups and unless the employer can demonstrate how the need is related to the job, it may be viewed as illegal under federal law. A number of states and localities have laws specifically prohibiting discrimination on the basis of height and weight unless based on actual job requirements. Therefore, unless job-related, inquiries about height and weight should be avoided.

Therefore, size discrimination in the workplace can be illegal under federal law if it is not a job requirement.

== Characteristics ==
Sizeism can be based on height, weight or both, and so is often related to height and weight-based discrimination but is not synonymous with either. Depending on where in the world one is and how one lives their life, people may have a tendency to be especially tall, slender, short, or plump, and many societies have internalized attitudes about size. Another manifestation of body variance is muscle mass and skeletal size, often with associations of degree of compliance to one's born sex, but do not necessarily affect gender to deviate from sex. As a general rule, sizeist attitudes imply that someone believes that their size is superior to that of other people and treat people of other sizes negatively. Examples of sizeist discrimination might include a person being fired from a job for being overweight or exceptionally short though their work was unaffected. Sizeism often takes the form of a number of stereotypes about people of particular heights and weights. Sizeist attitudes can also take the form of expressions of physical disgust when confronted with people of differing sizes and can even manifest into specific phobias such as cacomorphobia (the fear of fat people), or a fear of tall or short people.

Sizeism is aligned with the social construction of the ideal or "normal" body shape and size and how that shapes our environment. In the U.S. we can observe many public facilities shaped by this "normative" body, including: telephone booths, drinking fountains, bleachers, bathroom outlets (sinks, toilets, stalls), chairs, tables, turnstiles, elevators, staircases, vending machines, and doorways. Design assumptions are drawn about the size and shape of the users (height, weight, proportionate length of arms and legs, width of hips and shoulders).

Body-shaming, more specifically weight-shaming of men and women, is a widely known characteristic of sizeism, shown in the form of prejudice and discrimination can include both skinny shaming and fat shaming.

== Prevalence ==
Based on data analysis done on a survey of over 3,000 Americans, weight and height discrimination, a form of sizeism, was ranked just behind gender, age, and race as a highly experienced factor of discrimination. Among female respondents, weight and height discrimination exceeds race-based discrimination as the third most prevalent form of experienced discrimination. This discrimination was experienced in multiple settings, including from employers, interactions within the health-care field, in educational atmospheres, as well as within personal and familial relationships.

Greater prevalence was found to exist within those respondents who were self-reported as female, with 10% of female respondents reporting having experienced weight and height discrimination, compared to 5% of male respondents. For younger women, these numbers illustrated still an increase: 14.1% of women with a reported age range of 35–44 years old expressed experiencing weight and height based discrimination, and women who identified between 45 and 54 years of age were nearly five times more likely to have experienced weight and height based discrimination than their 65–74 year old counterparts. The study also found that African-American women were more likely to experience weight and height discrimination, with 23.9% of respondents having reported an incident.

The women most affected are those who identify as belonging to the highest weight category. Those women reported as moderately obese, or those with a body mass index of 30–35, were found to be three times more likely than their male counterparts of a similar weight to experience weight based discrimination.

== Countermeasures ==
Despite substantial research documenting weight discrimination and its negative impact on the lives of those targeted, under the US Constitution and federal law, it is legal to discriminate on the basis of weight. With the exception of the state of Michigan and several localities that have passed legislation explicitly prohibiting weight-based discrimination (i.e., San Francisco and Santa Cruz in California; Washington, DC; Binghamton, New York; Urbana, Illinois; New York City, New York (in employment, housing, and public accommodations); and Madison, Wisconsin), Americans have no viable means for seeking legal recourse in the face of weight discrimination, and existing US civil rights laws prohibit discrimination only on the basis of age, race, color, religion, sex, and national origin. Some individuals have attempted to file discrimination lawsuits under the Americans with Disabilities Act of 1990 (ADA), but plaintiffs must prove that their weight is a disability or perceived to be a disability according to ADA definitions, which is not the case for many people. Thus, few cases have been successful under this law and most of these successes have occurred since 2009, after Congress passed the ADA Amendments Act of 2008, which expanded the definitions of disability to include "severe obesity" (but not moderate obesity, overweight or underweight) as an impairment. For example, in 2012, the US Equal Employment Opportunity Commission (EEOC) successfully settled 2 cases for employees who were terminated from their jobs because their employers regarded them to be disabled based on their obesity and their severe obesity was now a covered disability under the new amendment. Despite these few recent successes, not all weight discrimination occurs in the context of disability or perceived disability, and legal remedies that can directly address weight discrimination as a legitimate social injustice remain absent.

== See also ==
- Body image
- Body positivity
- Fat acceptance
- Fattitude - 2017 documentary on fat discrimination
- Height discrimination
- Social stigma of obesity
- Thin ideal
