= Fearing the Black Body =

2019 book by Sabrina Strings

- Author: Sabrina Strings
- Subject: Sociology
- Publication date: May 2019
- ISBN: 9781479819805

Fearing the Black Body is a 2019 non-fiction book by American sociologist Sabrina Strings about the history of fatphobia, which Strings argues is rooted in anti-Black racism. It was published by New York University Press under the full title Fearing the Black Body: The Racial Origins of Fat Phobia.

== Synopsis ==
In Fearing the Black Body, Strings, associate professor of sociology at the University of California, Irvine, writes of the history of fatphobia and its intersection with anti-Black racism in Europe and the United States from the sixteenth-century to the present day. Strings explores the influence of various factors in the development of anti-fatness and its connection to racism, including the Atlantic slave trade, Renaissance art, scientific racism, and Protestantism, among others.

== Publication ==
Fearing the Black Body was published in May 2019 by NYU Press. The cover features an illustration depicting Sarah Baartman.

== Reception ==
Positive reviews of the book were published by Meshell Sturgis in Lateral, Etsuko Taketani in The Journal of American History, and Amelia Earhart Serafine in the Journal of Interdisciplinary History.

In Social Forces, Laura Jennings praised the accessibility of Strings's prose and the depth of her research, but noted that Strings occasionally falsely conflated physically descriptive terms like "obesity" with behavioral terms such as "gluttony." Jennings also noted that Strings's analysis of recent history is less extensive than her analysis of earlier centuries. In the European Journal of Women's Studies, Kathy Davis complimented the book's innovation, readability, and breadth, but expressed her wish that Strings had gone further in her analysis of the epidemiology of obesity as it relates to black women.

The book won the 2020 Sociology of Body and Embodiment Best Publication Award from the American Sociological Association.
