= Haley Morris-Cafiero =

American photographer

- Born: 1976 (age 49–50)
- Occupations: Photographer, Associate Professor and Acting Vice President of Academic Affairs
- Known for: "Wait Watchers"
- Website: haleymorriscafiero.com

Haley Morris-Cafiero (born 1976) is an American photographer, Associate Professor of Photography and Acting Vice President of Academic Affairs at the Memphis College of Art. Her series "Wait Watchers", in which she photographs the reactions of passers-by to her presence, went viral in 2013. She has since become a commentator on issues of anti-fat bias and obesity in the United States; as well as a Body Positivity and Anti-Bullying Workshop volunteer with Girls, Inc.

== Early life and education ==
Although muscular from her involvement in sports, Morris-Cafiero was anorexic as a teenager. As health concerns from her eating disorder caused her to realize the dangers of her lifestyle, she became less active. Due to hypothyroidism, she quickly gained weight in college, where she experienced discrimination due to her weight. Morris-Cafiero said people would anonymously leave low-calorie food and passive-aggressive notes about her weight. Though she tried dieting, her hypothyroidism kept her from easily losing weight. Born in Atlanta, she is a graduate of the University of North Florida, where she earned a BA in Photography and a BFA in Ceramics in 1999. Morris-Cafiero also holds a MFA from the University of Arizona in Art.

== Career ==
=== "Wait Watchers" ===
Morris-Cafiero was working on another project when she was inspired to begin the "Wait Watchers" series. A chance picture captured the amused expression of a passer-by as he looked at her. When she noticed that she had again accidentally captured the expression of a random passer-by who was observing her, she worked to capture more reactions. She started this project in 2010 when she began travelling to places such as Paris, Barcelona, and even Times Square. Although she had heard critical comments about her weight, she is not disheartened and instead feels empowered because she has the courage to face these situations. Morris-Cafiero sets up the camera first, then enters the shot as the camera takes continuous pictures. She is not aware of the reactions of the people around her at the time of the picture. People respond more naturally when she seems distracted, so she attempts to perform actions that would give that impression; otherwise, she acts normally and does not draw attention to herself.

People magazine called the series "powerful", and Life & Style called the pictures "heartbreaking". New York magazine wrote, "The frequency with which Morris-Cafiero succeeds at documenting passersby's visible disdain for her body seems pretty depressing". The Commercial Appeal called the reactions "alternately humorous and disturbing". Morris-Cafiero was not aware of the existence of the fat acceptance movement at the time she took the pictures, but she received a positive reception from those blogs. After several high-profile blogs highlighted her work, The Huffington Post in the US and The Daily Mail in the UK ran stories, which caused the series to go viral; it eventually became a worldwide phenomenon. Online trolling resulted in many negative comments. In The Daily Mail's comment section, most of the 4000 comments were negative. Morris-Cafiero said that while the negative comments initially bothered her, as the series went viral and the negative comments became more personal, she found them amusing and a source of creative inspiration. Following the viral popularity of her work, she was asked to appear on television news programs and provide commentary on fat shaming and other obesity-related topics. This series of photos enabled her to explore the modern issues surrounding body image and the ideal standard that people in society are often held to.

Haley uses her own body allowing he to explore subjects that to others may be distressing. In her photography series, she was able to objectively consider the responses she received to herself, which to others may have made them feel vulnerable. This piece wanted to explore body image and the standard which society has placed upon people to look a certain way. Given her previous relationship with her body she wanted to be able to discuss the issues of body image and the importance of increasing acceptance.

Morris-Cafiero does not interpret the photographs herself and prefers to leave that to the viewer; she says that, as an artist, she is more interested in starting a conversation. She says the theme is "identity being determined based upon an image". Many negative online comments have speculated on the onlookers' reactions, including criticism of Morris-Cafiero's attractiveness and her fashion sense. Other comments suggest that taking self-portraits in public places have drawn the ire of onlookers. Whilst the negative comments highlighted the judgment that people are faced with over their appearance, Haley noted that these comments were short-lived and that her work would last forever.

=== "Self Improvement" ===
In the series "Self Improvement", Morris-Cafiero responded to both positive and negative commentary about "Wait Watchers". In the negative comments, people complained that she would have a more positive reaction from onlookers if she exercised or got a makeover. The new series shows her in situations like this. She said that she was still met with "criticism and mockery". Whilst she was distressed by some of these comments she was also aware that whilst these comments were short lived her work had a much longer life span. The photographs were set in what she called "the most-vain cities in America", such as Venice Beach, California. She also targeted areas that her research told her had a high degree of eating disorders. The project continued through April 2015.

=== Other work ===
Morris-Cafiero solicited donations on Kickstarter to publish her work in a book. The book, which includes both positive and negative online commentary interspersed with the pictures, was published in December 2015. She said the book is "about how we look at one another and judgments". Other projects include a series where she dresses up as her critics to demonstrate the false personas used online. She has stated that her influencers includes Jenny Saville, Sophie Calle and Adrian Piper.
