= Body image =

Aesthetic perception of one's own body

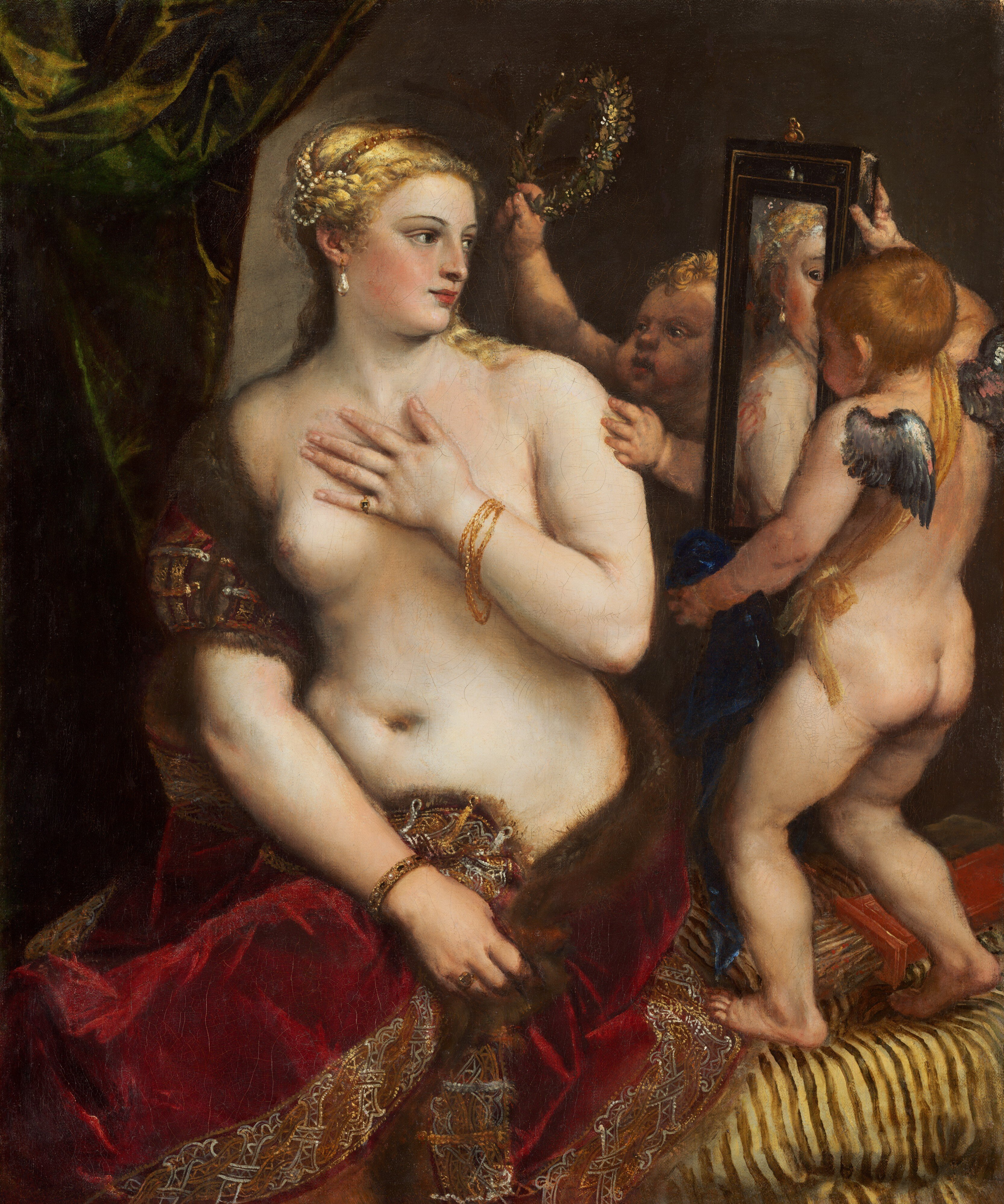
Venus with a Mirror (1555) by Titian

Body image is a person's thoughts, feelings and perception of the aesthetics or sexual attractiveness of their own body. The concept of body image is used in several disciplines, including neuroscience, psychology, medicine, psychiatry, psychoanalysis, philosophy, cultural and feminist studies; the media also often uses the term. Across these disciplines, there is no single consensus definition, but broadly speaking, body image consists of the ways people view themselves; their memories, experiences, assumptions, and comparisons about their appearances; and their overall attitudes towards their respective appearances (including but not limited to their skin tone, height and weight) all of which are shaped by prevalent social and cultural ideals.

Body image can be negative and diminishing ("body negativity"), positive ("body positivity") or neutral in character. A person with a negative body image may feel self-conscious or ashamed and may feel that others are more attractive. In a time when social media use is pervasive, people of different ages are affected emotionally and mentally by the appearance ideals set by the society they live in. These standards can contribute in part to body shaming – the act of humiliating an individual by mocking or making critical comments about a person's physiological appearance.

Often, people who have a low body image will try to alter their bodies in some way, such as by dieting or by undergoing cosmetic surgery. Such behavior creates body dissatisfaction and higher risks of eating disorders, isolation, and mental illnesses in the long term. In eating disorders, a negative body image may also lead to body image disturbance, an altered perception of the whole one's body. Body dissatisfaction also characterizes body dysmorphic disorder, an obsessive-compulsive disorder defined by concerns about some specific aspect of one's body (usually face, skin or hair), which is severely flawed and warrants exceptional measures to hide or fix. On the other hand, positive body image consists of perceiving one's appearance neutrally or positively, celebrating and appreciating one's body including its functionality, and understanding that one's appearance does not reflect one's character or worth.

Many factors contribute to a person's body image, including family dynamics, mental illness, biological predispositions and environmental causes for obesity or malnutrition, and cultural expectations (e.g., media and politics). Anyone can have positive or negative body image, regardless of appearance, because of this.

A 2007 report by the American Psychological Association found that a culture-wide sexualization of girls and women was contributing to increased female anxiety associated with body image. An Australian government Senate Standing Committee report on the sexualization of children in the media reported similar findings associated with body image. However, other scholars have expressed concern that these claims are not based on solid data.

== History ==
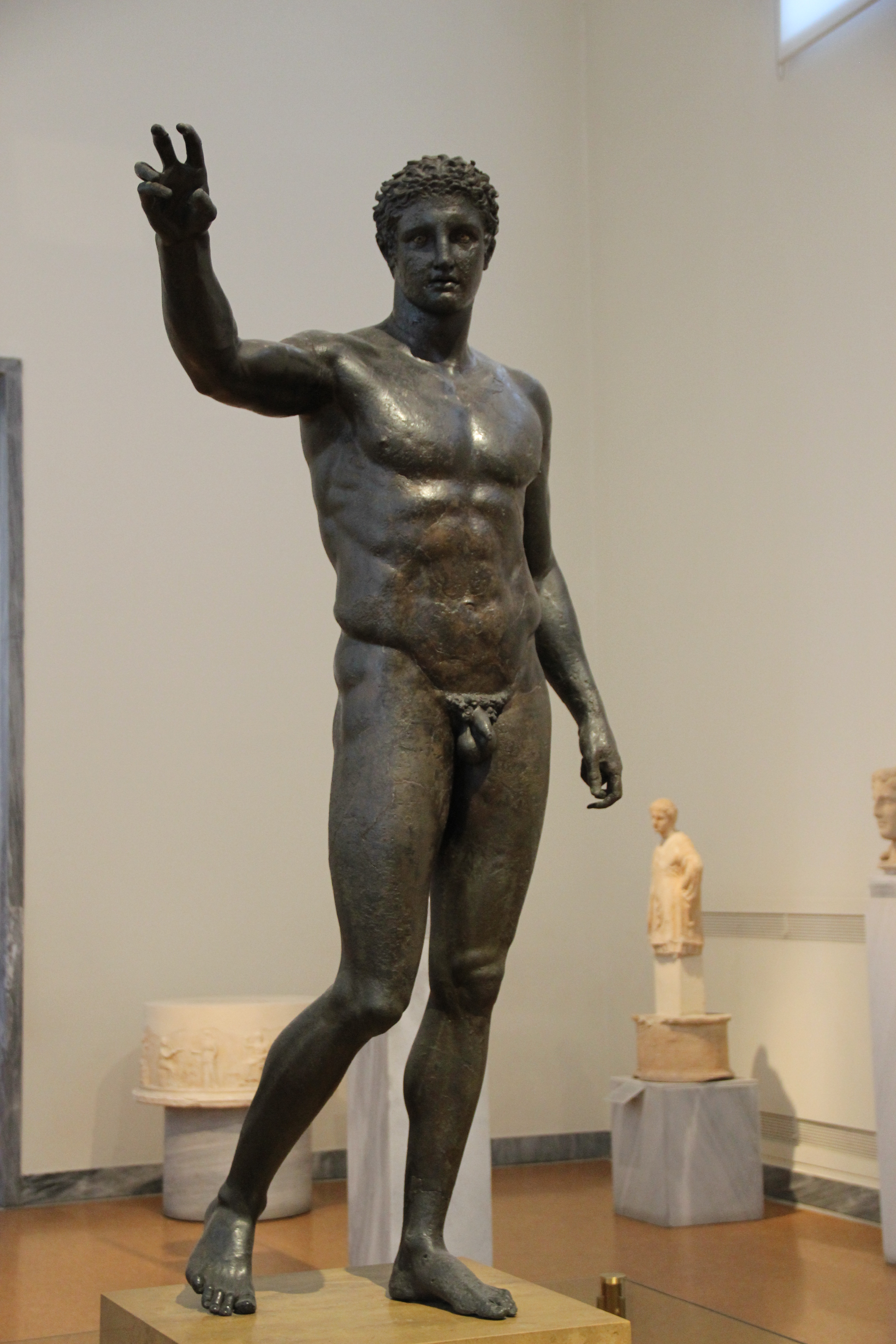
An ancient Greek male statue.

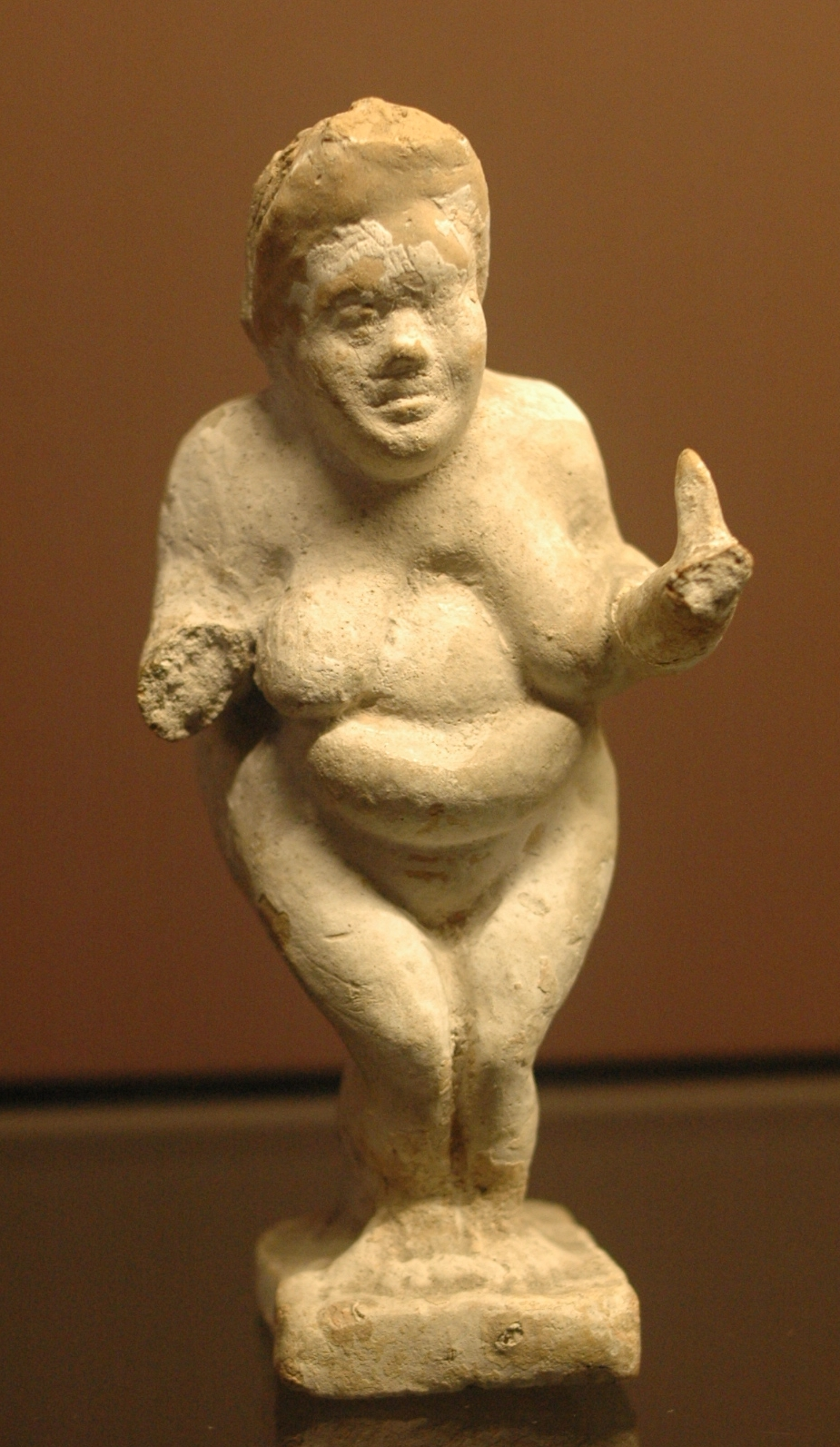
Statuette of a heavier woman

The phrase 'body-image' was first coined by Austrian neurologist Paul Schilder in his book The Image and Appearance of the Human Body (1935).

Specific ideals of appearance have always existed. This is well demonstrated by statues in Classical Antiquity that idealized slim and young female bodies and athletic male bodies.

Appearance ideals have also fluctuated according to sociocultural values. In many cultures, any appearance feature that implied social status or wealth was ideal. Because of the historical link of wealth to food, those with full-figured frames were seen as rich or powerful particularly before the 20th Century. In the Han dynasty, features such as clear skin and dark hair were highly prized, as it was thought that damaging the skin and hair your ancestors gave you was disrespectful.

Ancient Egyptians, Buddhists and Christian monks have also associated bald heads with holiness and cleanliness.

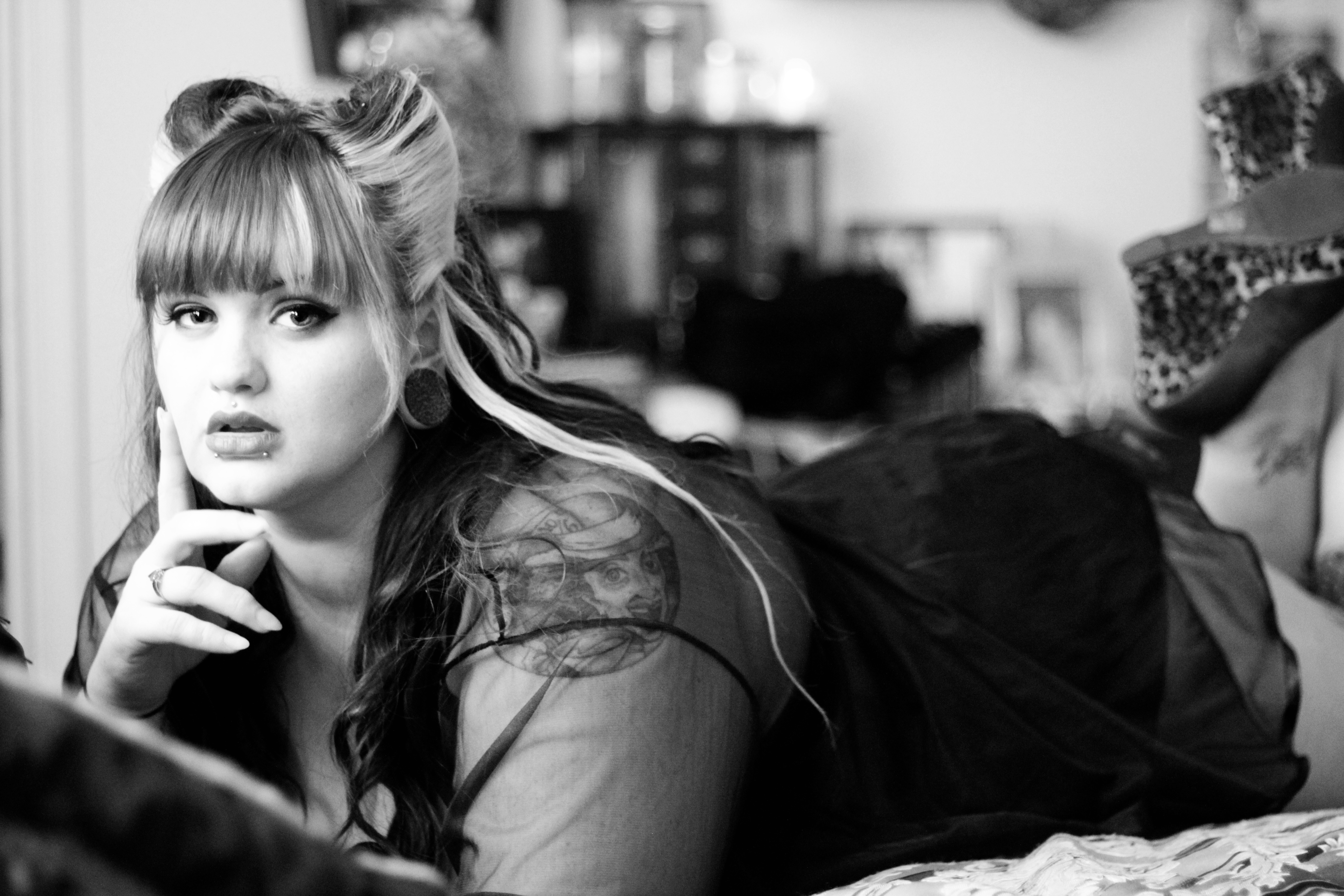
A contemporary plus-size model

Today, advancements in communication technology and expansions of the fashion, beauty and cosmetic industries have resulted in unprecedented levels of appearance pressures and body image concerns. Social media in particular has reshaped the "perfect body", and presents inconsistent and unrealistic ideals for our bodies including hair, body type, genital appearance, skin tone among other features.

== Demographics ==
=== Women ===
"Social currency for girls and women continues to be rooted in physical appearance". Women "all over the world are evaluated and oppressed by their appearances", including their ages, skin tones, or sizes.

Many advertisements promote insecurities in their audiences in order to sell them solutions, and so may present retouched images, sexual objectification, and explicit messages that promote "unrealistic images of beauty" and undermine body image, particularly in female audiences.

Body dissatisfaction creates negative attitudes, a damaging mentality, and negative habits in young women. The emphasis on an ideal female body shape and size is psychologically detrimental to young women, who may resort to grooming, dieting, and surgery in order to be happy. "The prevalence of eating disorder development among college females is especially high, with rates up to 24% among college students." Body dissatisfaction in girls is associated with increased rate of smoking and a decrease in comfort with sexuality when they're older, which may lead them to consider cosmetic surgery. The pressure on women and girls "to cope with the effects of culturally induced body insecurity" is 'severe'. Many reported that "their lives would be better if they were not judged by their looks and body shape, [as] this is leading to low self-esteem, eating disorders, mental health problems and depression."

Women who compare themselves to images in the media believe they are more overweight than they actually are. One reason for this is because "idealised media images are routinely subjected to computer manipulation techniques, such as airbrushing (e.g. slimming thighs and increasing muscle tone). The resulting images present an unobtainable 'aesthetic perfection' that has no basis in biological reality."

Global eating disorder rates such as anorexia and bulimia are gradually rising in adolescent girls. The National Eating Disorders Association, reported that 95% of individuals who suffer from an eating disorder are aged 12 to 26, and anorexia is the third-most-common illness among teenagers. Teenage girls are most prone "to internalize negative messages and obsess about weight loss to obtain a thin appearance". "Cultural messages about beauty (i.e. what it is, how it should be cultivated, and how it will be rewarded) are often implicitly conveyed through media representations of women."

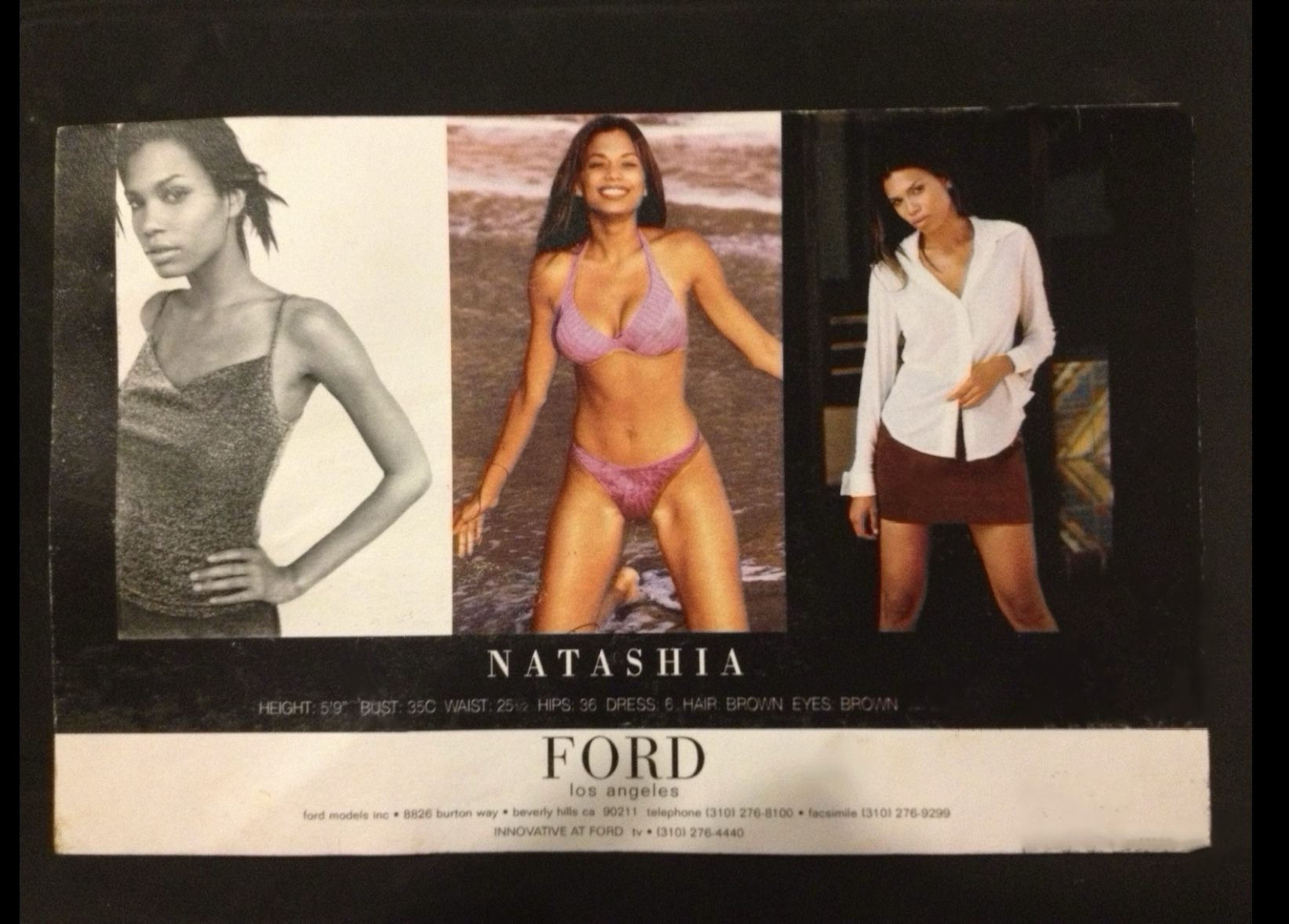
Fashion advert

However, other researchers have contested the claims of the media effects paradigm. An article by Christopher Ferguson, Benjamin Winegard, and Bo Winegard, for example, argues that peer effects are much more likely to cause body dissatisfaction than media effects, and that media effects have been overemphasized. It also argues that one must be careful about making the leap from arguing that certain environmental conditions might cause body dissatisfaction to the claim that those conditions can cause diagnosable eating disorders.

When female undergraduates were exposed to depictions of thin women their body satisfaction decreased; when they were exposed to larger models, it rose. Many women engage in "fat talk" (speaking negatively about the weight-related size/shape of one's body), a behavior that has been associated with weight dissatisfaction, body surveillance, and body shame. Women who overhear others using fat talk may also experience an increase in body dissatisfaction and guilt.

Monteath and McCabe found that 44% of women express negative feelings about both individual body parts and their bodies as a whole. 37.7% of young American males and 51% of young American females express dissatisfaction with their bodies.

In America, the dieting industry earns roughly 40 billion dollars per year. A Harvard study (Fat Talk, Harvard University Press) published in 2000 revealed that 86% of teenage girls are on a diet or believe they should be on one. Dieting has become common even among very young children: 51% of 9- and 10-year-old girls feel better about themselves when they are on diets.

According to a study by Dove, only 4% of women thought they were beautiful, while approximately 70% of women and girls in the UK believed the media's portrayal of impractical beauty standards fueled their appearance anxieties. As a result, the U.S. Department of Health and Human Services reported that, 91% of women were mostly unhappy with their bodies, while 40% will consider cosmetic surgery to fix their flaws.

=== Men ===
Similarly, media depictions idealizing a muscular physique have led to body dissatisfaction among young men. As many as 45% of teenage boys may suffer from body dysmorphic disorder (BDD), a mental illness whereby an individual compulsively focuses on self-perceived bodily flaws. Men may also suffer from muscle dysmorphia and may incessantly pursue muscularity without ever becoming fully satisfied with their physiques.

Research shows that the greatest impact on men's criticism of their bodies comes from their male peers, including likeminded individuals or potentially people they admire who are around the same age, as opposed to romantic partners, female peers, or male relatives like fathers or brothers. 18% of adolescent males were most worried about their weights and physiques (Malcore, 2016); 29% frequently thought about their appearances.; 50% had recently complained about the way they looked. 25% of males report having been teased about their weight, while 33% specify social media as the source for self-consciousness. Following celebrities on social media sites makes it possible to interact personally with celebrities, which has been shown to influence male body image. A number of respondents also admitted to being affected by negative body talk from others. 53% of boys cited advertisements as a "major source of pressure to look good; [though] social media (57%) and friends (68%) exerted more influence, while celebrities (49%) were slightly less persuasive". 22% of adolescent boys thought that the ideals depicted by the media were aspirational, while 33% called them healthy.

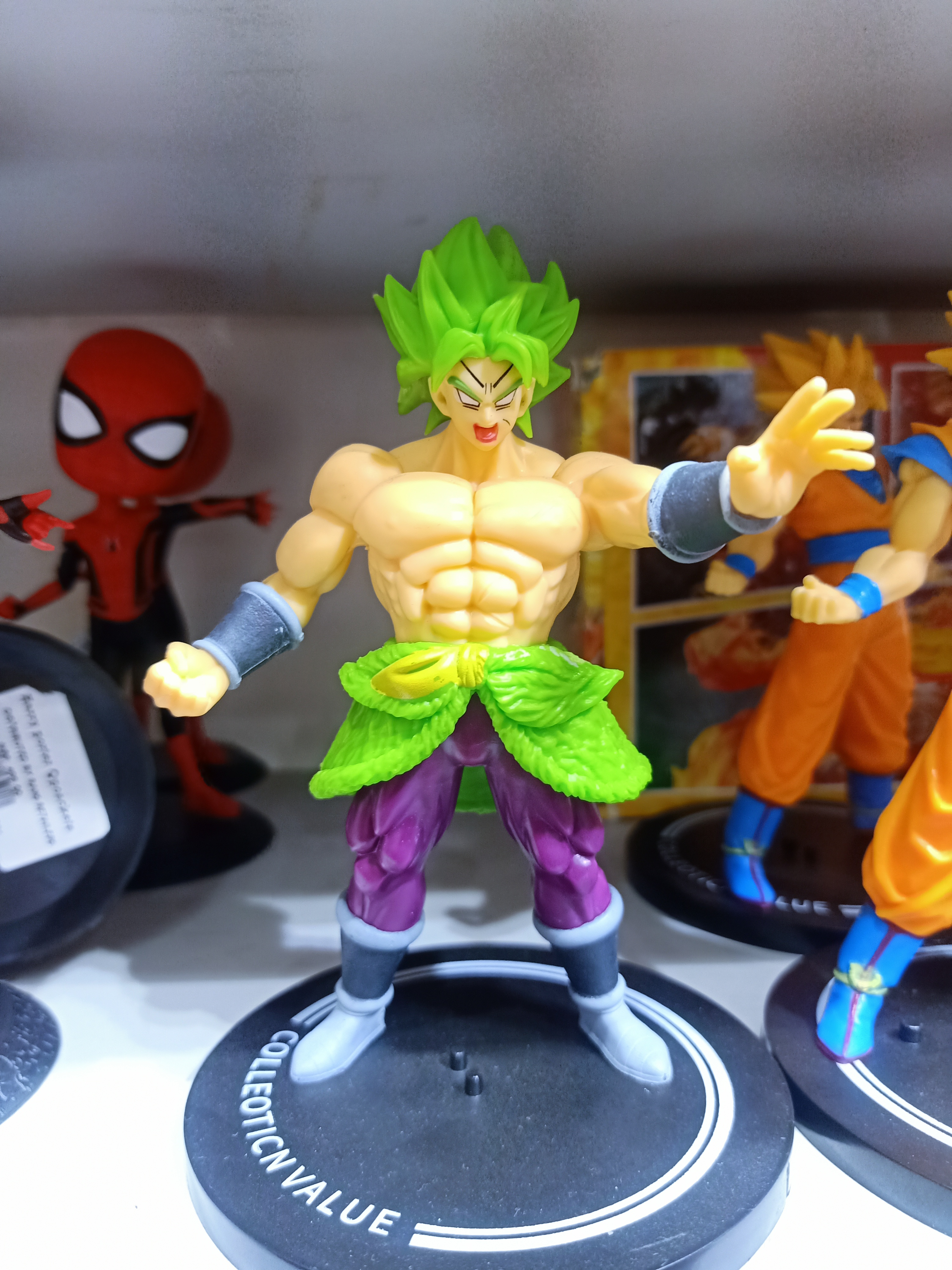
Boy's action toy

The ideal male body is perceived to feature a narrow waist and hips, broad shoulders, a well-developed upper body, [and] toned "six-pack" abs. The figure may be traced back to an idealized male doll, G.I. Joe. The "bulked-up action heroes, along with the brawny characters in many video games, present an anatomically impossible ideal for boys, much as Barbie promotes proportions that are physically impossible for girls." Action dolls have been found to gain more muscularity and lose body fat with successive editions. Boys who are exposed to depictions of muscular warriors who solve problems with their fists may internalize the lesson that aggression and muscles are essential to masculinity.

Some studies have reported a higher incidence of body dissatisfaction among Korean boys and girls than among boys and girls living in the United States, while noting that these studies fail to control for the slimmer and smaller size of Koreans as compared with Westerners. A cross-cultural analysis of the United States and South Korea focusing on social media found that between South Korean men and American men, Korean men are more concerned with their body image in relation to their social media use.

Teenage boys may participate in extreme workouts and weight training, and may abuse supplements and steroids to further increase muscle mass. In 2016, 10.5% acknowledged the use of muscle-enhancing substances, while 5 to 6% of respondents admitted to the use of steroids. Although dieting is often overlooked, a significant increase in eating disorders is present among men. Currently, males account for 1 in 4 of those suffering from eating disorders, while 31% have admitted to purging or binge eating in the past.

Men often desire up to 26 pounds of additional muscle mass. Men who endorse traditional masculine ideas are more likely to desire additional muscle. The connection between masculinity and muscle can be traced to classical antiquity.

Men with lower, more feminine waist–hip ratios (WHR) feel less comfortable and self-report lower body esteem and self-efficacy than men with higher, more masculine, WHRs.

=== Gender differences ===
Although body dissatisfaction is more common in women, men are becoming increasingly negatively affected. In a longitudinal study that assessed body image across time and age between men and women, men placed greater significance on their physical appearances than women, even though women reported body image dissatisfaction more often. The difference was strongest among adolescents. One theory to explain the discrepancy is that women have already become accustomed and desensitized to media scrutiny.

Studies suggest that the significance placed upon body image improved among women as they got older; men in comparison showed little variation in their attitude. Another suggested that "relative to men, women are considerably more psychologically aware of their appearances. Moreover, women's greater concern over body image has a greater impact on their daily lives."

As men and women reach older age, body image takes on a different meaning. Research studies show that the importance attached to physical appearance decreases with age.

=== Weight ===
The desire to lose weight is highly correlated with poor body image. Kashubeck-West et al. reported that when considering only men and women who desire to lose weight, sex differences in body image disappear.

In her book The Beauty Myth, Naomi Wolf reported that "thirty-three thousand women told American researchers they would rather lose ten to fifteen pounds than achieve any other goal." Through repeated images of excessively thin women in media, advertisement, and modeling, thinness has become associated with not only beauty, but happiness and success. As Charisse Goodman put it in her article, "One Picture is Worth a Thousand Diets", advertisements have changed society's ideas of beauty and ugliness: "Indeed to judge by the phrasing of the ads, 'slender' and 'attractive' are one word, not two in the same fashion as 'fat' and 'ugly.'"

Research by Martin and Xavier (2010) shows that people feel more pressure from society to be thin after viewing ads featuring a slim model. Ads featuring a larger sized model resulted in less pressure to be thin. People also felt their actual body sizes were larger after viewing a slim model as compared to a larger model.

Many, like journalist Marisa Meltzer, have argued this contemporary standard of beauty to be described as anorexic thinness, an unhealthy idea that is not representative of a natural human body: "Never before has the 'perfect' body been at such odds with our true size." However, these figures do not distinguish between people at a low or healthy weight who are in fact overweight, between those whose self-perception as being overweight is incorrect and those whose perception of being overweight is correct.

Post-1997 studies indicate that around 64% of American adults are overweight, such that if the 56%/40% female/male dissatisfaction rates in the Psychology Today study have held steady since its release, those dissatisfaction rates are if anything disproportionately low: although some individuals continue to believe themselves to be overweight when they are not, those persons are now outnumbered by persons who might be expected to be dissatisfied with their bodies but are not.

Some argue that the social pressure to lose weight has lessened what is described in both popular and academic parlance as an "obesity epidemic", despite the adverse effects. Overweight children experience not only discrimination but overall body dissatisfaction, low self-esteem, social isolation and depression. Due to the negative stigma, the child may suffer severely from emotional and physical ailments that could persist past childhood into adulthood.

=== Race ===
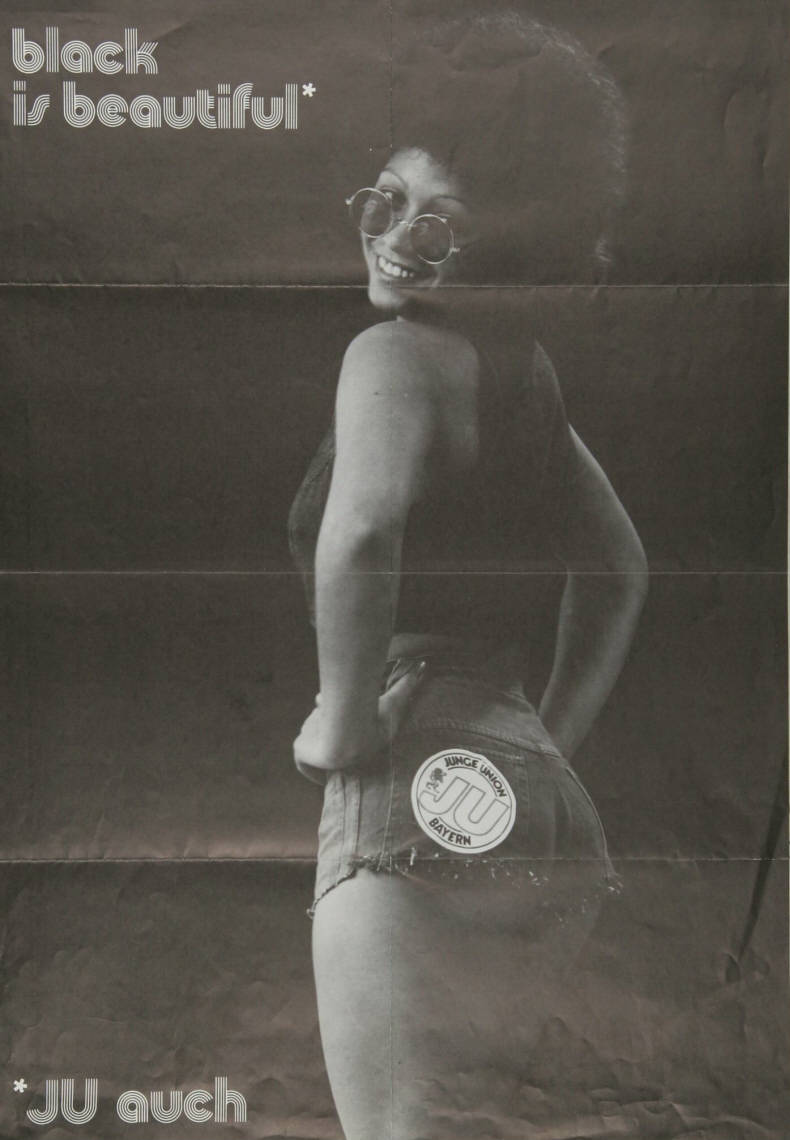
A Black is Beautiful poster.

The association of light skin and straight, blonde, hair with moral virtue dates back at least to the medieval era, and was reinforced during the Atlantic slave trade. The medieval theory that all races originated from the white race was an early source of the longstanding association of white bodies and beauty ideals with "normality" and other racial phenotypes as aberrant. The 1960s Black is Beautiful movement challenged this association.

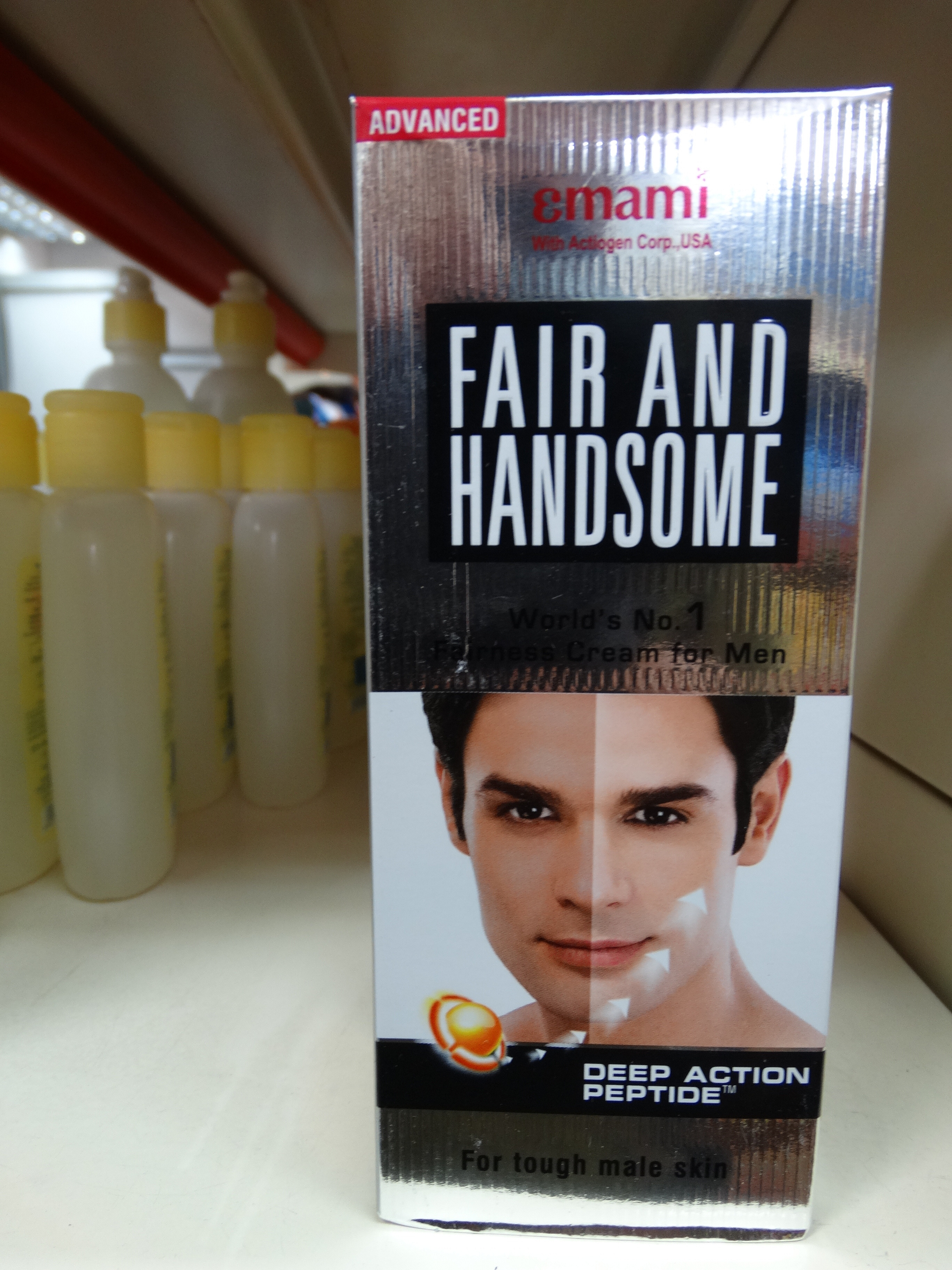
A skin bleaching product

A lack of black women in the fashion industry contributes to body image issues among African-American women. However, a 2003 experiment presented three photographs of conventionally attractive white, black and Asian women to white, black and Asian students. The study concluded that Asian women and white women both reported similar levels of body dissatisfaction, while black women were less dissatisfied with their own appearances. These findings are consistent with some previous research showing that black women generally have higher self-esteem than white or Asian women in America. One study found that, among women, East Asian women are more satisfied with their bodies than white women. East Asian men reported more body dissatisfaction than white males did. Western men desire as much as 30 pounds more muscle mass than do Asian men. However other researchers have suggested that body image assessments should move beyond assessing dissatisfaction with body size alone to assess disatisfaction with skin tone, hair type and facial features. This comprehensive assessment is likely to find that Black and Asian people face comparable if not higher levels of appearance pressures compared to White people.

=== Sexuality ===
There is no scientific consensus on how a person's sexuality affects their body image. For example, a 2013 study found that lesbian-identifying women reported less body dissatisfaction than did heterosexual women. In contrast, a 2015 study found no differences in weight satisfaction between heterosexual and lesbian and bisexual women, and no differences in the amount of pressure to be thin they experienced from the media, sexual partners, friends or family. This research did find that heterosexual women were more likely to have internalised the thin ideal (accepted the Western concept that thinness equals attractiveness) than lesbian and bisexual women.

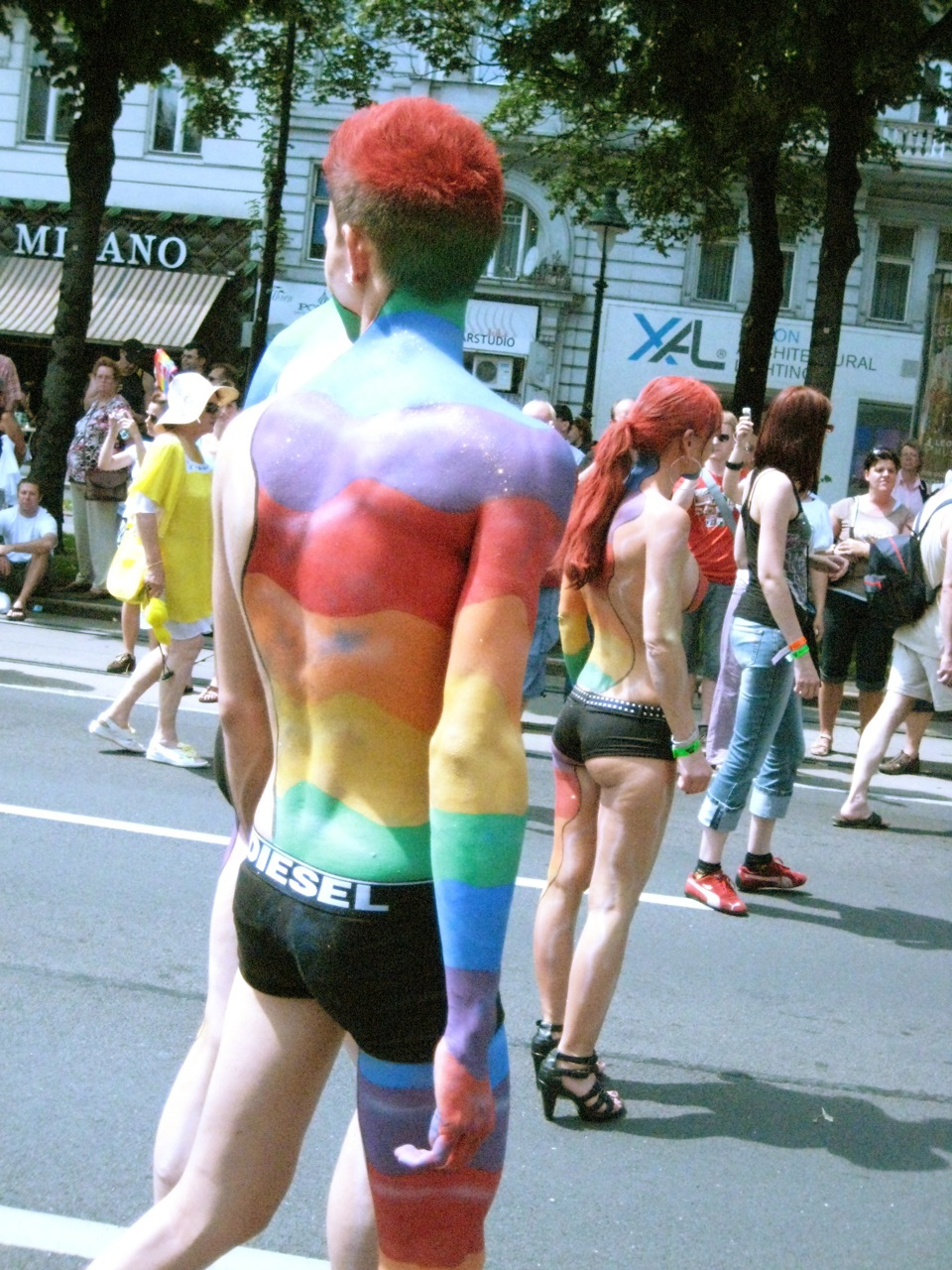
A man walking in a Pride parade.

Lesbian and bisexual women have said that while they are often critical of mainstream body size/shape ideals these are still the ideals that they feel social pressure to conform to. In a study conducted in 2017, Henrichs-Beck and Szymanski claimed that lesbian gender definition within the lesbian culture may dictate whether or not they are dissatisfied with their bodies. They suggested that lesbians who identified as more stereotypically 'feminine' were at greater risk of body dissatisfaction, while those who identified as more 'butch', were traditionally more satisfied with their bodies. Qualitative research with non-heterosexual women found that female sexual/romantic partners were a source of both body confidence and concerns. These women reported that while they compared their body size and shape to that of their partner, and could feel more self-conscious if their partner was slimmer than them, their attractions to women who did not conform to the narrow Western definition of 'beauty' gave them confidence in their own appearance.

A 2005 study found that gay men were more likely than straight men to have body image dissatisfaction, diet more, and were more fearful of becoming fat. There is some evidence to link the sexual objectification of gay males and heterosexual females by men in general as a reason for increased numbers in these groups for eating disorders and substance addictions. Bisexual people have historically been overlooked within body image research, either subsumed under gay/lesbian labels or ignored completely.

== Causes ==
=== Fashion industry ===
Fashion magazines directed at females subtly promote thinness and diet practices, and teenagers heavily rely on them for beauty and fashion advice. Seventeen in particular recorded one of the highest number of articles devoted to appearances; 69% of girls reported that it had influenced their ideal body shapes. 50% of advertisements featured also used beauty appeal to sell products. The U.S. Department of Health and Human Services reported that 90% of teenage girls felt a need to change their appearances, and that 81% of 10-year-olds were already afraid of being fat. According to a survey by Manchester Metropolitan University, "self-esteem and views of body image suffered after the participants were shown magazine pictures of models, [suggests] that media portrayal of images can prolong anorexia and bulimia in women and may even be a cause of it". A 2014 survey of 13- to 17-year-old Americans found that 90% "felt pressured by fashion and media industries to be skinny", and that 65% believed that the bodies portrayed were too thin. More than 60% habitually compared themselves to models, and 46% strove to resemble models' bodies.

According to Dove's The 2017 Dove Global Beauty and Confidence Report, "a total of 71% of women and 67% of girls want to call on the media to do a better job portraying women of diverse physical appearance, age, race, shape and size." In addition, 67% of men now strongly believe that it is unacceptable for brands to use photo manipulation techniques to alter the body image of a model. In response, the fashion magazine industry has made efforts to include 'real' women, and to reduce or ban the use of airbrushing tools. Likewise, some fashion brands and retailers adopt vanity sizing in their assortments to try to intentionally raise a customer's self-esteem while shopping in stores. This involves labeling clothes with smaller sizes than the actual cut of the items to trick and attract the consumer.

Fashion models themselves have experienced negative body image due to industry pressures: 69% reported that they were told to tone up, while 62% reported that their agencies had required them to lose weight or change their body shapes. 54% of models revealed that they would be dropped by their agencies if they failed to comply. Models frequently have underweight body mass index (BMI): a study published in the International Journal of Eating Disorders discovered that a majority of models had a BMI of 17.41, which qualifies as anorexia. In the past twenty years, runway models have also transformed from a typical size 6–8 to 0–2. The average weight of an American model was recorded to be twenty-three percent less than that of an average American woman. In 2006, the fashion industry came under fire due to the untimely deaths of two models, Luisel Ramos and Ana Carolina Reston, both of whom had suffered from eating disorders and been severely underweight. Other models endure intensive exercise regimes, diets, fasts, and detoxes; in order to maintain or lose weight. In addition, 17% have admitted to stimulant abuse, while another 8% frequently engaged in self-induced vomiting to induce weight loss.

Fashion industry insiders argue that clothes hang better on tall, thin catwalk models, but critics respond that an overemphasis on that body type communicates an unhealthy and unrealistic body image to the public.

=== Attempts at promoting body positivity ===
Various jurisdictions have taken steps to protect models and promote healthier body image. The U.K. and the U.S. have pursued social education campaigns. Spain, Italy, Brazil, and Israel prohibit models from working with a BMI below 18.5. France similarly forbids the employment of extremely skinny models, and requires medical certificates to verify their health.

France is also working on ensuring retailers specify when an image is airbrushed in magazines, websites, and advertisements, although it is unclear whether consumers are already aware of digital retouching techniques. Companies in France who want to avoid a fine must label their post if the image has been altered for enhancement.

Fashion conglomerates Kering and LVMH recently "announced that they will no longer hire models smaller than a U.S. size 2". in hopes of improving the working conditions of models and inspiring others to follow suit. Critics have objected that to ban size-zero models from working constitutes discrimination or thin-shaming. Moreover, the announcement of a small minimum dress size, which does not fit the average body type of most countries, continues to "send the message that super slim body types is the 'ideal'". Plus-size models are slowly emerging in mainstream media, which may improve body image. Prominent plus-size models include Ashley Graham, the face of popular plus-size retailer Lane Bryant, and Iskra Lawrence, a classified role model for lingerie and swimwear retailer aerie. Christian Siriano cast five plus-size models for his New York Fashion Week shows. Siriano made global headlines after he designed a gown for plus-sized actress Leslie Jones.

The lack of fashion-forward plus-size clothing in the fashion industry has given rise to the #PlusIsEqual movement. High-street brands such as Forever 21 and ASOS have increased plus-size product offerings. Other brands include Victoria Beckham's, who plans to release a range of high-street clothing with sizes up to XXXL, and Nike, which expanded its plus-size collection sizes 1X to 3X. In response to the criticism that the term plus-size caused unnecessary labeling, Kmart replaced its numerical sizing with positive tags such as, "lovely" and "fabulous" instead.

Models have notably used Instagram as a tool to "encourage self-acceptance, fight back against body-shamers, and post plenty of selfies celebrating their figure". In the U.S., a group of plus-size models launched the #DearNYFW campaign, which targeted the fashion industry's 'harmful approach' towards their bodies. This movement was broadcast across different social media platforms, with other models using the hashtag to share their experiences, in hopes of persuading the American fashion industry to start "prioritizing health and celebrate diversity on the runway". Fashion photographer Tarik Carroll released a photo series titled the EveryMAN Project to showcase large-framed queer and transgender men of color, with the stated purpose of "challenging hyper-masculinity and gender norms, while bringing body-positivity to the forefront".

Another tactic to promote body positivity has been to protest against photo retouching. In 2014, the Aarie Real campaign promised to display "campaign spreads and brand imagery with stomach rolls, gapless thighs and other perceived flaws that would normally have been edited out of the ads". Neon Moon, a feminist lingerie brand from London, advocates the beauty of flaws, instead of the need to retouch its models for aesthetic purposes. Another tactic was used by the U.S. e-tailer ModCloth, in which it employed its own staff as models for its swimwear collection.

=== Social media ===
A systematic review of 43 experimental studies involving 8,637 participants found that viewing idealized images on social networking sites was associated with increased body dissatisfaction among young adults. The review also identified appearance comparison as an important factor in this relationship. However, findings on whether body-positive images and captions improve body image were mixed, and further research was needed to understand long-term effects.

A 2025 meta-analysis of 20 experimental studies involving 3,603 young women found that exposure to idealized body-related content on social media reduced body satisfaction, while exposure to body-positive content produced a modest improvement. The analysis also found a stronger negative effect from idealized video content on TikTok than from idealized images on Instagram, although the number of studies available for comparing platforms was limited.

Beauty standards are being enforced and shaped by social media. Users are constantly exposed to notifications, posts, and photos about the lives of others. Despite the ability to create and control content on social media, the online environment still enforces the same beauty standards that traditional media promoted. Over-engagement with social networking platforms and images can lead to unattainable ideas of beauty standards. Oftentimes, the look of the people they idealize is the result of medical procedures. Influencers and celebrities change the way they look with the help of medical procedures, such as lip augmentation, which became a trend. There was an increase of 759% in botox procedures between 2000 and the late 2010s.

In an international study of social media apps, photo-based social media apps, predominately Facebook, Instagram and Snapchat, were found to have a negative impact on the body image of men more than non-photo-based social media apps. Another study by the Florida Health Experience found that "87% of women and 65% of men compare their bodies to images they consume on social and traditional media." They also found that users felt like they got more positive attention towards their bodies if they altered them in some way. A study by the University of South Australia discovered that individuals who frequently uploaded or viewed appearance-related items were more likely to internalize the thin ideal.

Applications, such as Instagram, have become a "body-image battleground", while "selfie" is what individuals use to criticize their bodies and others. Facebook and Snapchat also allow users to receive appearance approvals and community acceptance through the ratio of views, comments, and likes. Since individuals who use social media platforms often only display the high points of their lives, a survey by Common Sense Media reported that 22% felt bad if their posts were ignored, or if they did not receive the amount of attention they had hoped for. Instagram is ranked at the most detrimental to mental health according to a study done by the Royal Society for Mental Health. The increased use of body and facial reshaping applications such as Snapchat and Facetune has been identified as a potential cause of body dysmorphia. Social media apps that have body altering filters contribute to body image issues which most often result in eating disorders and body dysmorphia. Recently, a phenomenon referred to as 'Snapchat dysmorphia' has been used to describe people who request surgery to look like the edited versions of themselves as they appear through Snapchat filters.

Many users digitally manipulate the self-portraits they post to social media. According to research by the Renfrew Center Foundation, 50% of men and 70% of 18 to 35-year-old women edited their images before uploading. 35% of respondents were also actively concerned about being tagged in unattractive photos, while 27% fretted about their appearances online.

Reports have also shown that the messages delivered by "fitspiration" websites are sometimes identical to the "thinspiration" or pro-anorexia types. This is evident through "language inducing guilt about weight or the body, and promoted dieting". The marketing of restrictive diets to young women as a form of self care can cause "increasingly disordered eating", and orthorexia, an obsession with the right and wrong types of food.

==== Attempted social media tackling of the issue ====
A 2021 scoping review examined research on social media content intended to promote positive body image. The review found that images without people and images showing appearances that differed from conventional appearance ideals were among the content types most promising for supporting body image. However, the researchers noted that evidence about the effectiveness of positive captions, body-acceptance messages, and hashtags was limited or inconsistent.

In an attempt to tackle such issues, the UK launched a national campaign called Be Real, after findings showed 76% of secondary school students who learnt about body confidence in class felt more positive about themselves. The stated goal of this movement was to improve body confidence through educational resources provided to schools, and persuading the media, businesses, and the diet industry to endorse different body shapes and sizes instead.

Social media platforms such as Instagram have banned the use of "thinspiration and "thinspo" related hashtags. Other solutions include the promotion of hashtags such as #SelfLove and #BodyPositivity, and the promotion of "transformation photos", side-by-side images displaying an individual's fitness or weight-loss progress, which users have utilized to showcase the deceptiveness of social media. Eating Disorder Hope launched the Pro-Recovery Movement, a live Twitter chat encouraging sufferers to celebrate self-love and a positive body image, through recovery subject matters. Project HEAL introduced a campaign called #WhatMakesMeBeautiful, with the stated aim of celebrating admirable attributes other than appearance.

There have been recent demands for social media sites to highlight photos that have been edited and prevent universal publication.

== Measurement ==
Body image can be measured by asking a subject to rate their current and ideal body shape using a series of depictions. The difference between these two values is the measure of body dissatisfaction.

There are currently more than 40 "instruments" used to measure body image. All of these instruments can be put into three categories: figure preferences, video projection techniques, and questionnaires. Because there are so many ways to measure body image, it is difficult to draw meaningful research generalizations. Many factors have to be taken into account when measuring body image, including gender, ethnicity, culture, and age.

=== Figure rating scales ===
One of the measures of body image is figure rating scales, which present a series of body images graded from thin to muscular or from thin to obese. The subject is asked to indicate which figure best represents their current perceived body, and which represents their ideal or desired body. Bodies depicted in figure rating scales are either hand-drawn silhouettes, computer rendered images, or photographic images.

=== Video projection techniques ===
One study showed each participant a series of images of himself or herself with either increased weight or decreased weight. Each participant was asked to respond to the pictures, and their startle and eyeblink responses were measured. "Objective, psychophysiological measures, like the affect modulated startle eyeblink response, are less subject to reporting bias."

=== Questionnaires ===
BASS is a 9-item subscale of the Multidimensional Body-Self Relations Questionnaire. It uses a rating scale from −2 to +2 and assesses eight body areas and attributes and overall appearance (face, hair, lower torso, mid-torso, upper torso, muscle tone, height, and weight).

Questionnaires can have variable responses. For instance, "Acquiescent response style (ARS), or the tendency to agree with items on a survey, is more common among individuals from Asian and African cultures."

== See also ==
- Body shaming
- Body cathexis
- Body schema
- Body shape
- Body positivity
- Sizeism
- Thin ideal
- Fat acceptance
- Social stigma of obesity
- Height discrimination
- Fear of Negative Evaluation
- Male body shape
- Female body shape
- Media depictions of body shape
- Instagram's impact on people
- Effects of advertising on teen body image
- The Honest Body Project
- Physical attractiveness
- Figure rating scale
- Self (psychology)
- Ego
- Self-concept
- Sex in advertising
- Social Media
- Eating Disorder
- Intuitive eating
