= Figure rating scale =

Psychometric measurement

- Synonyms: Stunkard scale

The figure rating scale (FRS), also known as the Stunkard scale, is a psychometric measurement originally developed in 1983 to communicate about the unknown weights of a research subject's absent relatives, and since adapted to assess body image. The scale presents nine male and nine female schematic silhouettes, ranging from extreme thinness to extreme obesity. For research purposes, each participant is asked to self-select the silhouette that best indicates his or her current body size and the silhouette that reflects his or her ideal body size (IBS).

== Reliability and validity ==
Researchers assigned six specific instructions to ask of their participants during figure selection: (1) choose your ideal figure; (2) choose the figure that reflects how you think you look; (3) choose the figure that reflects how you feel most of the time; (4) choose the figure that you think is most preferred by men; (5) choose the figure that you think is most preferred by women; and (6) pick the opposite sex figure that you find most attractive. For validity analyses, the figure ratings can be transformed into the three following discrepancy measures: (1) feel minus ideal; (2) think minus ideal; and (3) feel minus think. The instructions developed for these measures may be changed depending on the specific topic of research or category of observation. Depending on its goal, each research study may require a different set of reliability and validity assessments.

== Research ==
The figure rating scale has been used in studies on body image, body satisfaction, and eating disorders, and may reveal broad trends in body satisfaction across gender, media, race, and culture.

Most research involving the figure rating scale focuses on observing body dissatisfaction. This research area also focuses primarily on the effects of gender on body dissatisfaction. In association with the figure rating scale, more research has been conducted on female body image. Studies of body dissatisfaction have shown a woman will tend to choose an ideal body size smaller than her current body size. This discrepancy between the two figure selections indicates body dissatisfaction. A high level of body dissatisfaction can lead to eating disorders or depression.

The figure rating scale has also been used to show that the media is an important factor in body dissatisfaction. Research suggests that in media, women are mostly influenced by the thin ideal body type whereas men are mostly influenced by a muscular build. When studied in college women, body image perceptions vary across races, with African-American women choosing larger ideal body sizes than Caucasian and Asian women. The figure rating scale has been translated into multiple languages. Korean women are more dissatisfied with their bodies due to the pressures of thinness that exist in that particular culture. Australian women feel more body dissatisfaction than Hong Kong women.

== Correlated measurements ==
Results from figure observations have been applied to other scales in order to assess body dissatisfaction and eating disorders. These scales provide more data that can assist researchers in determining why an individual will select a particular silhouette on the figure rating scale.

- The Eating Disorder Inventory (EDI) assesses various aspects of eating disorders.
- The Bulimia scale (B) provides seven item measures that analyze the symptoms of bulimia such as binging or purging.
- The Drive for Thinness scale (DT) consists of seven items that measure the intensity of an individual's desire to lose weight or fear of gaining weight.
- The Body Dissatisfaction (BD) Scale consists of nine items and measures the extent to which individuals are satisfied with specific parts of the body. This scale has been used in conjunction with the figure rating scale in order to observe if an individual's sensitivity to a particular body part explains his or her choice of silhouette.
- The Body-Esteem Scale for Adolescents and Adults (BESAA) consists of twenty-three statements that measure an individual's general feelings about his or her physical appearance.
- The Male Body Attitudes Scale (MBAS) consists of 24 items and assesses the three dimensions of body attitude in men (muscularity, low body fat, and height).

== Applied theoretical frameworks ==
In order to properly use this type of measurement, it is important to understand how researchers have applied theoretical frameworks. This scale is most associated with body image research. Researchers conducting observations in this area will also draw on theories from psychology and communications to understand why an individual will choose a certain silhouette to represent his or her own body type.

Social comparison theory suggests that an individual will compare his or her own physical appearance to the body images presented in the media. Researchers have used this theory in association with the figure rating scale.

Self-discrepancy theory distinguishes among three domains of the self: the actual self, the ideal self, and the ought self. The individual may choose a separate silhouette for each domain of the self.

== Limitations ==
Since the scale's development in 1983, alternative body image measurements have been created for research in this area. The line-drawn silhouettes provided in the scale may not provide a clear presentation of the average human body. As the silhouettes in the scale shift from very thin to very obese, the figures gain more in the middle of the body, which may not reflect the way all bodies gain weight. Some individuals may have broader shoulders or wider hips than in the images provided in the scale; therefore, participants may have a more difficult time choosing the appropriate figures to represent their physical appearances. Research has also translated this scale into computer rendered images and photographic images with real people. These three-dimensional images are able to depict a more realistic presentation of different body types.

== See also ==
- Body image
