= The Honest Body Project =

Collection of pictures of real women

The Honest Body Project is a collection of photographic portraits and stories from women aimed to empower and encourage self-love. The project was created by photographer Natalie McCain from Rockledge, FL. The collection contains hundreds of portraits and stories on various topics of womanhood, photographed in black and white and without manipulation to alter the appearance of the women. The women are often accompanied by their children. There have been many series taken from the project.

== Series ==
- "The Beauty in a Mother" featured pregnant mothers sharing their stories, including a plus-size mother shamed for her maternity photos.
- "After the Baby Is Born" was the follow-up series to The Beauty in a Mother and featured the women 4–6 weeks postpartum.
- "We Are Not 'Still' Nursing, We Are Just Nursing" featured women who breastfeed their children from ages 2–5, sharing stories on extended breastfeeding.
- "Defined by Our Hearts" featured mothers sharing stories about their children with various special needs.
- "True Faces of Depression" shared stories of women who have various mental illnesses, such as depression, anxiety disorder, PTSD, and postpartum depression.
- "Balancing Both Worlds" shared the stories of working mothers and how they balance motherhood with their career.
- "No Mother Should Be Ashamed" featured mothers who bottle-feed their children for various reasons and shared their stories.
