= Social stigma of obesity =

Type of discrimination based on weight

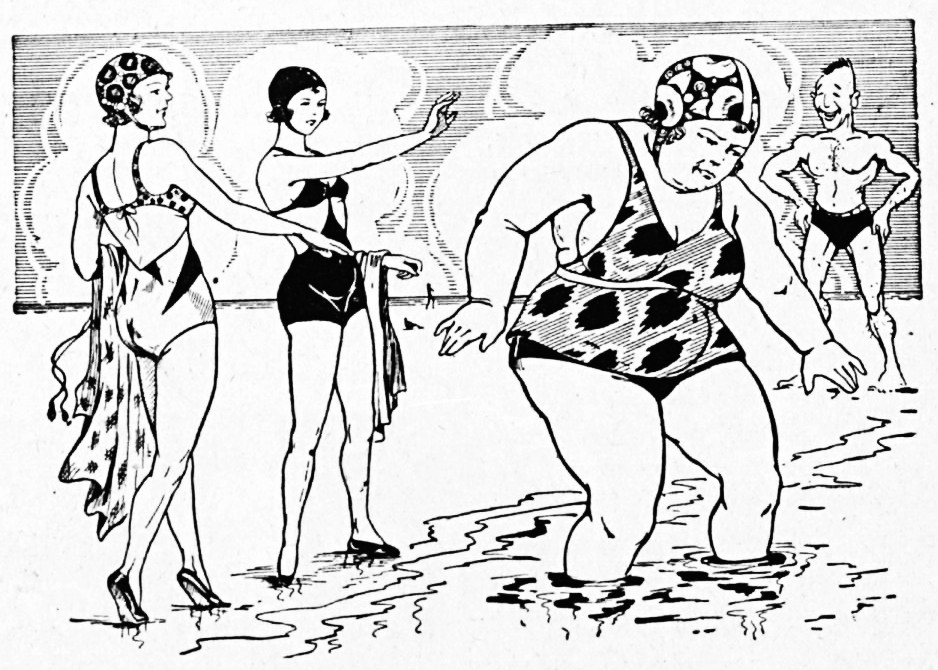
Body shaming of an overweight woman depicted in a 1942 advertisement for a dietary supplement

Social stigma of obesity is bias or discriminatory behaviors targeted at overweight and obese individuals because of their weight and high body fat percentage. Such social stigmas can span one's entire life as long as excess weight is present, starting from a young age and lasting into adulthood. Stigmatization of obesity is usually associated with increased health risks (morbidity) of being overweight or obese and the possibility of a shorter lifespan (mortality).

Overweight and obese people marry less often, experience fewer educational and career opportunities, and on average earn a lesser income than normal weight individuals. Although public support regarding disability services, civil rights, and anti-workplace discrimination laws for obese individuals have gained support across the years, overweight and obese individuals still experience discrimination, which may have detrimental implications in relation to both physiological and psychological health.

These issues are compounded by the significant negative physiological effects that are already associated with obesity, which some have proposed may be caused in part by stress from the social stigma of obesity (or which may be made more pronounced as a result of that stress).

Anti-fat bias refers to prejudicial assumptions that are based on an assessment of a person as being overweight or obese. It is also known as "fat shaming" or "fatphobia". Anti-fat bias can be found in many facets of society, and fat activists commonly cite examples of mass media and popular culture that pervade this phenomenon.

== Characteristics ==
Studies have indicated that experiencing weight stigma reinforces lifestyle behaviors that contribute to obesity. Individuals who are overweight or obese tend to devalue their own in-group and prefer the out-group (i.e. thinner individuals).

== Prevalence ==
Individuals who are subjected to weight-related stigma are shown to be admired less in the public eye when compared with other groups, such as sexual and gender minorities and those with mental illness. In the US, self-reported incidents of weight-based discrimination increased from 1995 to 2006.

Anti-fat bias has been observed in groups hoping to become physical education instructors. In a study published in 2007, a group of 344 psychology or physical education majors at a New Zealand University were compared, and it was found that the prospective physical education teachers were more likely to display implicit anti-fat attitudes than the psychology majors.

A number of studies have found that health care providers frequently have explicit and/or implicit biases against overweight people, and it has been found that overweight patients may receive lower quality care as a result of their weight. Medical professionals who specialize in the treatment of obesity have been found to have strong negative associations toward obese individuals. The stress from obesity-related stigma may also cause negative health outcomes.

A 2004 study in preschool-aged children reported a preference for average-sized children over overweight children as friends. Overweight individuals often found themselves suffering repercussions in many facets of society, including legal and employment issues later in their life.

According to a 2010 review of published studies, interventions seeking to reduce prejudice and social stigma against fat and obesity are largely ineffective.

== Theoretical explanations ==
In order to understand weight-biased attitudes, theories have been proposed to explain these biases and the subsequent discrimination they cause. Christian S. Crandall discusses the "Justification of Stigmatization". Also his Social Ideology Perspective draws on traditional North American values of self-determination, individualism, and self-discipline.

Based on these values, anti-fat attitudes may derive from directing blame for being overweight towards individuals who are overweight. Similarly, the attribution theory suggests that attitudes towards obese individuals are dependent on how much control they are perceived to have over their weight. Throughout the literature, numerous studies have shown support for this theory. One study conducted a multinational examination of weight bias across four countries (Canada, United States, Iceland, and Australia) with comparable obesity rates.

The study found that attributions of behavioral causes of obesity were associated with greater weight bias. Similarly, viewing obesity as being caused by a lack of willpower was also associated with greater weight bias. There appears to be a decrease in weight bias when weight is attributed to factors that are less within the individual's control, or when individuals are perceived as trying to lose weight. However, evidence also exists showing that biases against obese individuals also include disgust towards them, which can persist regardless of if one knows that obesity is not caused by obese individuals' actions.

Fatphobia does not generally refer to a fear of obese people, but rather a socially constructed phenomenon of particular prevalence in the western world. People who live in the west commonly value healthy and strong bodies that prioritize agility, endurance and fertility, with focus on achievement and individual responsibility.

Not only do such bodies associate the western world with similar ideals, but Lloyd deMause suggests the 'fitness/toughness craze' may also reflect preparations for war. The overabundance of calorically high, nutrient- and other essential vitamin and mineral-depleted food options more common in the western hemisphere is often associated with people who are against fat phobia. The 'fattening huts' of young girls in Nigeria however, represent beauty, marriageability and money – a direct reflection of the value of economic resource and food. There, fatness is a welcome sign of health, prosperity and maternity: linked to self-worth and sexuality also.

Fatphobia does not fear 'fat' but prejudice, discrimination, exclusion and preventable disease too: fears directly attributable to the myriad of social, political, historical, economic and cultural processes at work (that do not similarly exist in other cultures). In this way, fatphobia is a culturally derived phenomenon influencing relationships to food as well to the female form. Trends in 'blame, shame and stigma' have contributed to fat positivity and 'health at every size' movements, that create digital 'safe spaces' for activism and radical fat acceptance that seek to resist and shift such powerful cultural perspectives.

== Trait attribution ==
Anti-fat bias leads people to associate individuals who are overweight or obese with negative personality traits such as "lacking willpower", "lazy", "gluttonous", "stupid", "incompetent", or "unmotivated". This bias is not restricted to clinically obese individuals. It also encompasses those whose body shape is found to be unacceptable when compared to modern society's perception of the ideal body type (although still within the normal or overweight body mass index (BMI) range). Fat-shaming is fairly common in the United States, even though most adult Americans are overweight. Huffington Post wrote "two-thirds of American adults are overweight or obese. Yet overweight and obese individuals are subject to discrimination from employers, healthcare professionals, and potential romantic partners".

Anti-fat bias can be escalated by giving a context to the individual's appearance of obesity. For example, when told an individual was obese because of "overeating" and "lack of exercise", a higher implicit bias was found among study participants than those not provided with context. However, when the group was told that "genetics" was to blame, they did not exhibit a lowered implicit bias after the explanation.

Anti-fat bias is not a strictly Western cultural phenomenon. Instances of implicit anti-fat bias have been found across several cultures.

Additionally, recent work around physical appearance issues, body image, and anti-fat or obesity prejudice suggests that feelings about one's own appearance may stimulate downward physical comparisons with obese individuals in order to make one feel better about one's own physical appearance.

== Weight discrimination ==
Weight stigma is present in multiple settings including healthcare, education, interpersonal situations, multiple media forms and outlets, and across many levels of employment.

In the United States, studies also indicate overweight and obese individuals experience rates of stigma near prevalent to that of racial discrimination.

=== In the media ===
Media, in general, overrepresents underweight individuals and underrepresents overweight individuals. One-third of women in television are classified as underweight, while only 5% of the general population falls into that category. Conversely, a study on over a thousand major television characters from 2003 identified 14% of female characters and 24% of male characters to be overweight, despite the real-world percentages being more than double those reported numbers.

Even when overweight people are included in television, they often play minor, stereotyped roles. Nearly two thirds of the most popular children's movies contain negative portrayals of overweight people, stereotyping them to be unintelligent, lazy, and evil. Fat television characters are more commonly seen eating and are less likely to be involved in romantic relationships compared to average weight television characters. Male characters are less commonly portrayed as having close friendships.

In 2007, another analysis had trained individuals analyze 135 scenes featuring overweight individuals from popular television programs and movies to check for anti-fat humor coding. Analysis revealed that fat stigmatization humor and commentary was verbal and directed at the individual in their presence. Additionally, a relationship was found between audience laughter and a male character poking fun at a female character's body, but that same relationship wasn't there when it was a female character ridiculing a fat male.

There is a great deal of empirical research to support the idea of thin ideal media, or the idea that the media tends to glorify and focus on thin actors and actresses, models, and other public figures while avoiding the use of overweight individuals.

Puhl et al. (2009) also reviewed how in entertainment, news reporting, and advertising, media is a particularly potent source of weight stigma. News reports have blamed individuals who are overweight and obese for various societal issues including prices of fuel, global temperature trends, and precipitating weight gain among their peers. The news media repeatedly engages in the "Headless Fatties" phenomenon, coined by Charlotte Cooper, in which images and videos only depict overweight individuals as bodies by cropping out their heads. This objectification happens in 72% of all news reports on obesity.

The University of California, Los Angeles, conducted a study that analyzed scientific research on weight and the news reports on such research. They looked for disparities in language, the cited causes of obesity, and proposed solution. News stories were more likely than the scientific articles to use dramatized language, words such as epidemic, crisis, war, and terrorism, and were more likely to cite individual behaviors as the causes and solutions to obesity, ignoring the systemic issues.

In September 2011, prominent nationally syndicated columnist Michael Kinsley (founding editor of Slate magazine) wrote, "New Jersey Governor Chris Christie cannot be president: He is just too fat [...] why should Christie's weight be more than we can bear in a president? Why should it even be a legitimate issue if he runs? One reason is that a presidential candidate should be judged on behavior and character ... Perhaps Christie is the one to help us get our national appetites under control. But it would help if he got his own under control first." Governor Christie responded on October 4, 2011, stating "The people who pretend to be serious commentators who wrote about this are among the most ignorant I've ever heard in my life. To say that, because you're overweight, you are therefore undisciplined—you know, I don't think undisciplined people get to achieve great positions in our society, so that kind of stuff is just ignorant."

In 2013, Haley Morris-Cafiero's photography project "Wait Watchers", in which she photographed the reactions to her presence by random passers-by, went viral. New York magazine wrote, "The frequency with which Morris-Cafiero succeeds at documenting passersby's visible disdain for her body seems pretty depressing".

=== In education ===
In regards to more direct weight bias, obese individuals were 40–50% more likely to report a perception of major discrimination compared to those of average weight across a multitude of settings. In the educational setting, those who are overweight as youth often face peer rejection and are bullied more.

Overweight children have poorer school performance if they experience weight-based teasing. Between fifth and eighth grade, a child's increase in BMI results in a decrease in their teacher's perception of that student's ability, and 50% of principals believe fatness is just a result of lacking self control. Teachers, particularly those teaching physical education classes, sometimes express negative attitudes towards overweight individuals.

Research suggests that within the classroom teachers may perceive overweight individuals' work more poorly compared to average weight individuals. Students also perceive overweight individuals as being likely to have lower GPAs, and students are less likely to want to do groupwork with overweight individuals compared to average weight individuals.

Research has also found that overweight females receive less financial support for education from their families than average weight females, after controlling for ethnicity, family size, income, and education. As individuals grow older they may be less likely to be admitted to college than individuals of an average weight, and in some cases, people were admitted to academic institutions then dismissed due to their weight.

Puhl and colleagues (2009) concluded from their review of weight stigma in education that current trends indicate students with obesity face barriers to educational success at every level of education. Reviewed research demonstrates that educators, particularly physical education teachers, report antifat attitudes toward their students with obesity, which may undermine educational achievement.

Importantly, the education disparities for students with obesity appear to be strongest for students attending schools where obesity is not the norm. Several studies have evidenced that in environments such as these, students with obesity face greater educational disadvantages and are less likely to attend college, an effect that is particularly strong among women. Moreover, weight stigma in educational settings also affects interpersonal relationships (see "Interpersonal situations" below).

=== In employment ===
Studies suggest that obese individuals are less likely to be hired and once hired, have greater termination rates than average weight individuals. Specifically, a national survey found that obese individuals were 26% more likely not to be hired, not receive a promotion, or to be fired compared to average weight persons. Such outcomes may be a result of employers viewing them as less agreeable, less competent and lazier than average weight individuals.

Weight stigma can lead to difficulty obtaining a job, worse job placement, lower wages and compensation, unjustified denial of promotions, harsher discipline, unfair job termination, and commonplace derogatory jokes and comments from coworkers and supervisors. In their review, Rebecca M. Puhl et al. find that employees with obesity report their weight as the most influential factor contributing to losing their job. Another review by Giel and colleagues (2010) found that certain stereotypes about employees with obesity are highly endorsed by employers and supervisors, in particular that they have poorer job performance and that they lack interpersonal skills, motivation, and self-control.

=== In politics ===
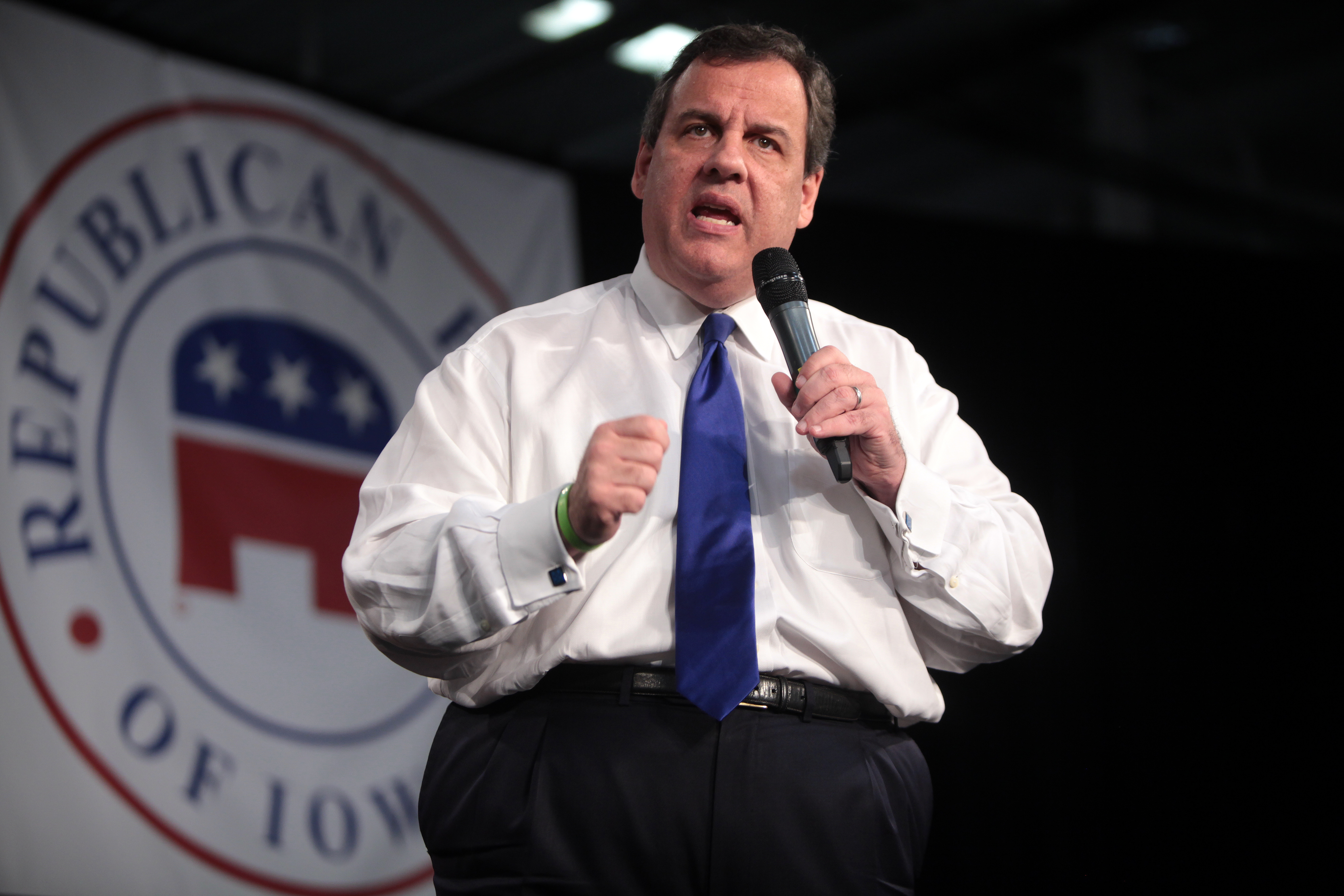
New Jersey Governor Chris Christie is a politician who was subjected to weight-related discrimination during his political career.

A study by Michigan State University researchers shows evidence that overweight political candidates tend to receive fewer votes than their thinner opponents. The researchers analyzed data from the 2008 and 2012 U.S. Senate elections. Using a previously established scientific method, research assistants determined from color photos whether the candidates in 126 primary and general elections were of normal weight, overweight, or obese.

Both obese men and women were often less likely to get on the ballot in the first place. When it came to merely being overweight, women were seen underrepresented on the ballot, though men were not. This is consistent with previous research showing slightly overweight men tend not to experience the same discrimination as slightly overweight women.

However, when it came to the voting, both male and female candidates, whether obese or simply overweight, tend to get a lower share of the vote total than their more slender opponents. Some politicians have resorted to extreme weight loss measures, including surgery, to increase their electability to political office.

=== In healthcare ===
Medical professionals may be more likely to view obese individuals in negative terms (such as annoying or undisciplined), have less patience with obese individuals, and assume non-compliance with their treatments. As such, these individuals may receive poorer care compared to average weight people.

Primary care physicians overstate the effects of being overweight on all-cause mortality, describing being overweight as much more detrimental than clinical guidelines indicate. Additionally, nurses have reported a reluctance to touch obese persons during treatment. A national survey of the United States found that individuals who were overweight reported a three times higher likelihood to be denied medical care than average weight people. In the UK, 25 out of 91 primary care trusts have bans for the treatment of obese individuals in addition to weight loss requirements.

Additionally, a 2012 survey revealed that 54% of doctor respondents believe the National Health Service should have the ability to withhold non-emergency treatment from obese individuals. Further, health professionals who specialize in obesity showed strong implicit and explicit anti-fat bias as measured by self-report and the Implicit Associations Test (IAT). However, such biases were mixed amongst dietitians and nutritionists.

In their 2009 review, Puhl and colleagues found that many studies provide evidence supporting the notion that health professionals (including doctors, nurses, medical students, fitness professional, and dietitians) consistently endorse negative stereotypes about patients with obesity, in particular ascribing to them culpability for their weight status.

Weight stigma in the healthcare settings leads to impaired patient-provider communication, poorer doctor-patient relationships, poorer medical care and treatment (for example doctors spending less time with patients), and avoidance of the healthcare system all together on the part of the patient. However, it is important to point out that the evidence that has been reviewed thus far comes primarily from self-report studies. Therefore, Puhl and colleagues concluded that research examining actual health outcomes is needed. Overall, the impact of weight stigma in healthcare has become so problematic that many scholars have suggested that obesity-prevention programs should make minimizing stigma a priority.

=== Interpersonal situations ===
Although a less studied topic than employment and healthcare, several studies reviewed by Puhl and colleagues (2009) provide evidence that overweight and obese women in particular face weight stigma from many interpersonal sources including family, friends, and romantic partners. Another recent review by Puhl and Suh (2015) also documented that in school settings weight-based bullying is one of the most prevalent types of harassment reported by parents, teachers, and students. Experiencing interpersonal weight stigma is related to myriad negative physical and mental health consequences (see "Mental health and psychological consequences" below).

In a 2017 study, results showed that 89% of obese adults had been bullied by romantic partners.

=== In early development ===
This external stigmatization and its internalized effects have been examined across different age groups. Overweight and obese children and adolescents experience stigmatization from parents, teachers, and peers. Peer stigmatization, especially, may be difficult for overweight adolescents considering the role of peer support in promoting identity development and self-esteem. Some research suggests that negative attitudes about being overweight are even held by overweight and obese children themselves. Specifically, weight bias may become internalized and increases throughout childhood. It then decreases and levels-off during late adolescence and adulthood.

Weight-based teasing in childhood and adolescence has been associated with a variety of damages to psychosocial health, including reduced self-esteem and lower self-concept, higher rates of depression and anxiety disorders, and even greater likelihood of entertaining suicidal thoughts. Further, weight-based teasing has been associated with higher rates of binge eating and unhealthy weight control (e.g., fasting, self-induced vomiting, laxatives, diet pills, skipped meals and smoking). Overweight adolescents who were bullied were also more likely to meet criteria for bulimia.

A survey of 7,266 children aged 11 to 16 conducted by the World Health Organization reported higher rates of physical victimization (e.g., being shoved) with increasing body mass index (BMI) among girls. Additionally, these results showed relational victimization (i.e., being excluded or having rumors spread about you) was reported more often at increasing BMI by both girls and boys. A separate survey of 7,825 students aged 11 to 17 also noted that, compared to average-weight peers, obese boys and overweight girls were more likely to be victims of bullying. Additionally, obese girls were more likely to be victims and perpetrators of bullying than their peers. Notably, overweight and obese adolescent girls also reported higher rates of smoking, drinking, and marijuana use relative to their normal-weight peers.

== Health-related outcomes associated with weight discrimination ==
Stigmatization of obesity is associated with increased risk of obesity and increased mortality and morbidity. In adulthood, individuals who experience weight discrimination are more likely to identify themselves as overweight regardless of their actual weight status. The experience of weight stigma can function as motivation to avoid stigmatizing environments, and although it may motivate one to escape stigma through weight loss, it undermines one's capacity to do so. Researchers have linked weight stigma to decreases in physical activity, decreases in seeking health care and increases in maladaptive eating patterns such as binge eating. In addition, those who have experienced weight stigma have shown altered cardiovascular reactivity, increased cortisol level, oxidative stress, and inflammation.

People who expect to be fat-shamed by healthcare providers are less likely to seek care for medical issues or for weight loss, even if the weight gain is caused by medical problems.

In terms of psychological health, researchers found that obese individuals demonstrated a lower sense of well-being relative to non-obese individuals if they had perceived weight stigmatization even after controlling for other demographic factors such as age and sex. Overweight and obese individuals report experiencing forms of internalized stigma such as body dissatisfaction as well as decreased social support and feelings of loneliness. In addition, similar to findings in adolescence, weight stigma in adulthood is associated with lower self-esteem, higher rates of depression, anxiety, and substance abuse.

In both adults and children with obesity, several reviews of the literature have found that across a variety of studies, there is a consistent relationship between experiencing weight stigma and many negative mental and physical health outcomes. These will be discussed separately in the sections below, although physical and mental health consequences are often intertwined, in particular those related to eating disorders.

Papadopoulos and Brennan (2015) recently found that across many reviewed studies of weight loss treatment-seeking adults, relationships emerged between experiencing weight stigma and both BMI and difficulty losing weight. However the findings are somewhat mixed. They also report evidence that experiencing weight stigma is related to poor medication adherence. Among weight loss treatment-seeking adults, experiencing weight stigma might exacerbate weight- and health-related quality of life issues.

This review along with reviews by Vartanian and Smyth (2013) and Puhl and Suh (2015) have also found that across several studies and in both adults and children, experiencing weight stigma is related to decreased exercise behavior overall, as well as decreased motivation to exercise, decreased exercise self-efficacy, and increased food craving and tendency to overeat. These effects of weight stigma on exercise and physical activity emerge independent of body mass index, suggesting that weight stigma becomes a unique barrier to physical activity outside of barriers that may be associated with obesity in particular.

Finally, across many studies, Puhl and Suh (2015) also found that experiencing weight stigma is related to many physiological consequences as well, including increased blood pressure, augmented cortisol reactivity, elevated oxidative stress, impaired glycemic control/elevated HbA_{1c}, and increased systemic inflammation, all of which have notable consequences for physical health and disease.

=== Mental health and psychological consequences ===
Broadly speaking, experiencing weight stigma is associated with psychological distress. There are many negative effects connected to anti-fat bias, the most prominent being that societal bias against fat is ineffective at treating obesity, and leads to long-lasting body image issues, eating disorders, suicide, and depression.

Papadopoulos's 2015 review of the literature found that across several studies, this distress can manifest in anxiety, depression, lowered self-esteem, and substance use disorders, both in weight loss treatment-seeking individuals as well as community samples. Many empirical reviews have found that weight stigma has clear consequences for individuals suffering from eating and weight disorders (including anorexia nervosa, bulimia nervosa, and binge eating disorder), as it plays a unique role, over and above other risk factors, in perpetuating disordered eating psychopathology. These results have emerged in both adult and adolescent, as well as in male and female samples.

The study shows an interesting table that demonstrates how fast food consumption due to social and cultural pressures leads to body image shame and guilt, which, in many cases, leads people to search for comfort, creating a cycle of binge eating. This article makes it evident that shaming and forcing people into guilt for their actions does not help or solve the issue of obesity. Better alternatives include teaching people the mental and physical benefits of eating healthily versus eating unhealthily, but without resorting to shaming unhealthy eating habits.

== Treatments ==
The human brain naturally forms pathways and connections, trying to relate everything humans experience in the world into categories. Many social scientists believe the root of stigma and prejudice is the grouping of people into categories that reflect stereotypes about those groups. The media, such as movies and TV shows, can shape how groups of people are viewed. This causes the discrimination that overweight people face in many aspects of their lives.

Studies show the best way to reduce this inherent bias is through therapy/control groups. Bias will never go away in humans if they are sheltered and unwilling to get better. Meeting, talking with, and forming bonds with the people discriminated against is an effective way to reduce social stigma.

== Policy ==
Over the past few decades, many scholars have identified weight stigma as a long-standing form of social stigma and one of the last remaining socially acceptable forms of prejudice. It follows then that individuals who are targets because of overweight and obesity, still face uniquely socially acceptable discrimination.

Civil rights legislation such as Title VII of the Civil Rights Act of 1964 prohibits discrimination based on race and several other domains, but weight is not included in this act. At the local level, only one state in the US (Michigan) has policy in place for prohibiting weight-related employment discrimination and very few local municipalities have human rights ordinances in place to protect individuals of large body size.

Specifically, localities that have passed legislation explicitly prohibiting weight-based discrimination include the state of Michigan; San Francisco and Santa Cruz in California; Washington, DC; Urbana, Illinois; Binghamton, New York; New York City, New York (in employment, housing, and public accommodations), and Madison, Wisconsin.

Typically, the only of type of legislation that overweight and obese individuals can cite in lawsuits is related to disability. For example, the Americans with Disabilities Act is one such avenue, but as Puhl et al. (2009) report, it is difficult for many individuals with obesity to qualify as disabled according to the criteria included in this statute. Few cases have been successful and most of these successes have occurred since 2009, after Congress passed the ADA Amendments Act of 2008, which expanded the definitions of disability to include "severe obesity" (but not moderate obesity, overweight or underweight) as an impairment.

However, in 2012, the US Equal Employment Opportunity Commission (EEOC) successfully settled 2 cases for employees who were terminated from their jobs because their employers regarded them to be disabled based on their obesity and their severe obesity was now a covered disability under the new amendment. Despite these few recent successes, not all weight discrimination occurs in the context of disability or perceived disability, and legal remedies that can directly address weight discrimination as a legitimate social injustice remain absent.

== Public health ==
The existing literature largely does not support the notion that weight stigma might encourage weight loss; as cited above, experiencing weight stigma (both interpersonally as well as exposure to stigmatizing media campaigns) is consistently related to a lack of motivation to exercise and a propensity to overeat.

In a 2010 review examining whether weight stigma is an appropriate public health tool for treating and preventing overweight and obesity, Puhl and Heuer concluded that stigmatizing individuals with obesity is detrimental in three important ways: (1) it threatens actual physical health, (2) it perpetuates health disparities, and (3) it actually undermines obesity treatment and intervention initiatives.

In line with this, another recent review of the consequences of experiencing weight stigma, this one conducted by Puhl and Suh (2015), concluded that considering the myriad negative physical and mental health consequences associated with experiencing weight stigma, it should be a target, instead of a tool, in obesity prevention and treatment. These authors further recommend that a necessary first step in reducing weight stigma is raising broader awareness of its negative consequences.

== Race ==
With higher representation of black people being categorized as overweight by the BMI, the social stigma of obesity disproportionately affects black people. More than 80% of African American women are categorized as overweight using the Body Mass Index.

Sociologist Sabrina Strings writes, in her book Fearing the Black Body, about the historical ways in which fatphobia emerged out of an attempt by white people to distance themselves from black people. In 1751, Denis Diderot published the Encyclopédie, which was the first publications to claim that black people were "fond of gluttony."

In 1853, French aristocrat Arthur de Gobineau claimed, about black people, that their "gluttonous nature to be one of their more base characteristics." In 1910, Charles Davenport founded the Eugenic Record Office, and he claimed that "obesity was a vile condition to be avoided. It was, moreover, racially inherited." Eugenics sentiment toward black people regarding their size was prevalent.

Black bodies are already stigmatized, which can result in violence when interacting with the social stigma of obesity. In a 2017 article published in the African American Review, one author cited the killing of Eric Garner as an example of this, as some excuses for using excessive force on Garner were his size, as he was an overweight man. The article explains how ableism, fatphobia, and racism interact to form a "double bind" in which violence is excused because fatness is already causing inherent injury, but necessary because the size of a large black person is a threat.

A paper published by the American Journal of Preventive Medicine titled "Intersectionality: An Understudied Framework for Addressing Weight Stigma" focused on highlighting the intersectionality between weight stigma and health-related coping responses across several non-white racial and gendered groups. The findings of this publication demonstrated that there were no significant differences in weight stigma as a function of race or gender, having an overall equal representation across all racial groups analyzed.

Nonetheless, results additionally demonstrated that different racial groups had differing ways of internalizing and coping with weight and health-related stigmas, which as a result heightened health risks. Results revealed that white women and men reported higher weight bias internalization in comparison to black women and men.

Additionally, Hispanic women were demonstrated to cope with weight stigma via disordered eating patterns more than black and white women. Along with this black women are less likely to deal with weight related stigma by developing eating disorders in comparison to white women. The results of this research article highlighted the importance of needing to increase research and policy attention to addressing weight and health-related stigma as an issue regarding prevention and treatment for obesity in order to consequently decrease weight-driven inequalities in communities and differing groups, primarily focused on race and gender.

== Responses ==
=== Fat acceptance movement and organizations ===
The fat acceptance social movement in the USA emerged in the 1960s to highlight and counter social stigma and discrimination faced in a range of domains. Besides its political role, for example in the form of anti-discrimination NGOs and activism, the fat acceptance movement also constitutes a subculture which acts as a social group for its members.

=== Language and identity ===
The fat acceptance movement often uses the adjective "fat" and neologisms like "infinifat" as a reclaimed word. Preferences regarding terminology and descriptions vary, however, with common disagreements revolving around which words to use (e.g. "fat", "overweight", "obese"/"obesity", "of size"), the use of person-first language (e.g. "a person with obesity"), the use of medicalized terminology, and the avoidance of stigma.

==== Person-first language ====
Person-first language, which emerged from some disability advocacy groups, has the ostensible goal of treating a person independently of a trait. However, it also has the consequence of treating that trait as "toxic" abnormality which should be "fixed" to achieve normalcy, and which due to its inherent negativity must be talked about in a special, careful way, rather than used as a simple "benign" descriptor.

Critics believe that because such a formulation necessarily begins from the assumption that there is something wrong with being overweight, it contributes to further stigma. Furthermore, person-first language can contribute to the medicalization of obesity, as this is the language commonly used when referring to disease. This may explain why person-first language is favored more often by those working in the obesity field (and therefore seeking medical "fixes") than by other groups. Advocacy groups have criticized a top-down approach whereby proponents of person-first language claim to speak for all, whereas in reality it is not the preferred terminology of many in the fat-acceptance movement.

==== Descriptions and terminology ====
Various studies of overweight people seeking weight loss as well as a semantics study of terminology used to describe an overweight individual concluded that using the word fat elicits a negative reaction from people already critical of obesity. However, "obesity" was found in one study to be equally as undesirable as "fat" when considering language preferences of overweight individuals.

"Fat" is the preferred term within the fat acceptance movement. Fat activists have reclaimed the term as a neutral descriptor in order to work against the stigma typically associated with the term. In fact, many fat activists will censor the word "obesity" when tweeting or citing it as "ob*sity" due to its pathologizing nature. The word "obesity" directly stems from the Latin word "obesus" which means "that has eaten itself fat". Fat activists will also use this Latin definition to show stigma in the word "obese" itself, as it places blame on the individual for their state.

== See also ==
- Fat acceptance movement
- Fattitude—2017 documentary on fat discrimination
- Height discrimination
- Reddit anti-fat communities
- Sizeism
