= Thin ideal =

Concept of the ideally slim female body

The thin ideal is the concept of the ideally slim female body. The common perception of this ideal is a woman who possesses a slender, feminine physique with a small waist and little body fat. The size that the thin ideal woman should be is decreasing while the rate of female obesity is simultaneously increasing, making this body difficult for women to maintain. This creates a gap between the actual appearance of an average woman’s body and its expected appearance which, depending on the extent to which a woman internalizes the necessity of living up to this ideal for her well-being and peace of mind, may have serious psychological effects.

== Internalization ==
The degree to which women are psychologically affected by the thin ideal depends to what extent the ideal is internalized. An article from a journal written by Ahern, et al. highlights these ideals. Women generally relate the ideally thin body to positive life outcomes such as happiness, confidence, and romantic success, and consequently a majority of women value the thin ideal to some extent.

However, it is important to recognize the distinction between women who are aware of the advantage of thinness versus those who internalize the ideal and make it a personal belief system. Although the idea of the thin ideal seems omnipresent, not all women identify with the ideal in the same manner and not all are affected by it negatively. For example, after seeing an image of a thin woman in the media, some women may fantasize themselves as thinner and more attractive. To some, this exposure to the thin ideal may make thinness seem more attainable and act as a motivational factor in self-improvement.

== Studies ==
Many studies have been performed regarding the effect of the thin ideal. Some of these indicate that after women are shown images of ultra-thin models, they experience psychological and behavioral features associated with eating disorders, such as increased anger, depressed mood, body dissatisfaction, and low self-esteem. The images had an immediate negative effect on the mood of the participating women. In a study conducted by Halliwell and Dittmar (2004), of 202 UK women, they found that those exposed to thin models created greater body-image anxiety in women who internalised the thin ideal compared to those who were exposed to average-sized models. Another study demonstrated that positive associations women made with underweight models frequently led to weight-focused anxiety and an elevated drive for thinness, both of which are principal symptoms of eating disorders. Several longitudinal studies have suggested that internalization of the thin ideal is a precursor to body image dissatisfaction and unnecessary dieting in women of a healthy weight. As Evans stated in the Psychology of Women Quarterly, “Women often feel dissatisfied with their appearance after comparing themselves to other females who epitomize the thin-ideal standard of beauty.”

=== Development ===
A study by Mia Sypeck of The American University’s Department of Psychology examined the covers of the four most popular fashion magazines over the forty-year period from 1959 and 1999. Several trends were discovered. Firstly, the body size of fashion models decreased, indicating that the thin ideal has been shrinking in size. Secondly, there was a substantial rise in pictures that show the female body, which suggests that society has been placing more value on the way women's bodies appear.

== Media ==
Many theorists believe that the ultra-thin images in the media play a significant part in the influence of body dissatisfaction, disordered eating, and internalization of the thin ideal. A correlational study by Stice et al. (2004) suggests that a larger number of media exposures may be linked to a greater risk of body dissatisfaction, internalization of the thin ideal, and development of eating disorders symptoms. However, few of the population in the study actually developed clinical eating disorders, and as the study was correlational, the said causes and effects may not be directly linked. For example, many women enjoy looking at fashion magazines for entertainment and do not experience immediate negative effects. Consequently, the theory that the media directly influences low self-esteem and body image dissatisfaction may be too simple.

=== Social influences ===
Contents of "thin-ideal media" include the portrayal of thinness as a desirable trait, and protagonists in media are thin, exceptionally beautiful, desirable, and successful. According to the sociocultural model of bulimia, eating disorders are a product of the increasing pressures for women in our society to achieve an ultra-slender body. There are two components to the social comparison theory: Downward social comparison, comparison to others perceived to be less fortunate than ourselves, and usually serves to enhance mood or self-worth; upward social comparison, comparison to others we perceive as socially better than ourselves, which usually leads to negative moods and self-evaluation. In order to attempt to measure women's media-ideal internalization and comparison, researchers developed the Sociocultural Attitudes Towards Appearance Questionnaire. Women with a high degree of internalization are more likely to use thin-ideal media images as an upward comparison target and consequently feel that they do not meet the thin-ideal standard of attractiveness. Women in the media are presented as having different roles in society depending on context and demographics. Television, magazines, and newspapers along with advertisements have a powerful and influential role in society, and women in the media are often role models for young, impressionable girls. Mass media affect dominant societal values and can influence the population. "Of the many variables thought to promote eating pathology, sociocultural factors are considered paramount."

Media-portrayed idealized images of the female body shape are linked to body dissatisfaction among women. The effects of these images have also been linked to other problems among women including depression, obesity, and extreme dieting. "The sociocultural etiological model is based on the premise that societal factors send powerful messages to girls and young women that certain physical attributes are unacceptable." Women are presented with thin-ideal images on a regular basis and are conditioned to compare themselves to these images; research shows that women with high body image self-discrepancy are more at risk of negative correlations from exposure to thin-ideal media. "Self-discrepancies are representations in the self-concept of ways in which one falls short of some important standard." Women who possess a body image self-discrepancy associate failure to reach a thin-ideal with their self-concept. Research shows that only women who were dissatisfied with their physical appearance had concerns regarding social comparison to the thin ideal.

=== Impact on women ===
Correlational studies have linked exposure to media that contain ultra-thin ideals to increased body-dissatisfaction, thin-ideal internalization, self-discrepancies, and eating pathology in young women. Sociocultural theory maintains that current societal standards for beauty emphasize the desirability of thinness, and thinness at a level impossible for many women to achieve by healthy means. Photo manipulation that elongates legs and narrows hips of already skinny models have harmful effects on young women because they compare themselves to those images. Idealized images also suggest that real women do not measure up to such presentations of beauty, and they cannot reasonably obtain such physical expectations. The standard media-portrayed thin ideal woman is about 15% below the average female body weight, "This ideal stresses slimness, youth and androgyny, rather than the normative female body. The thin-ideal woman portrayed in the media is biogenetically difficult, if not impossible, for the majority of women" to achieve.

Studies show the degree of thin-ideal internalization is correlated with the severity of eating disorder pathology. "Evidence also has shown that endorsement of the thin-ideal correlates with both bulimic symptoms and subsequent diagnosis of bulimia." Stice and Shaw suggested in a study done in 1994 that thin-ideal media body images may produce negative mood states in women. Prolonged exposure to the thin-ideal can cause women to compare themselves to these images and lead to feelings of inadequacy. Stice and Shaw suggested that women who over-internalize the thin-ideal image tend to experience increased body dissatisfaction and a decrease in self-esteem. As women over-internalize they may set unrealistic goals for themselves regarding their body dimension. "Those who have over-internalized the thin-ideal stereotype are convinced that achieving a thin-ideal body is the only way to be popular, loveable, successful, and happy."

When it comes to the impact on women's self-esteem, exposure to thin models does not necessarily mean that there will be a negative impact. The way that the models are presented makes a difference. A study has shown that there is a positive impact on women's self-esteem when they are shown moderately thin, not extremely thin models. One study has shown that exposure to extremely thin and extremely heavy models both have a negative effect on the way that some women in the study might see their own bodies. As for models that are only moderately thin or moderately heavy there doesn’t seem to be a negative impact but a positive one on self-image. (Smeesters and Mandel 581).” If the media started to do this more when it comes to models an increase of self-esteem could happen.

=== Women in magazines ===
Women's magazines focus mainly on "domestic" aspects of life, including marriage, child-rearing, beauty, etc. More than 75% of women’s magazines include at least one ad or article about how to change their physical appearance by diet, exercise, or cosmetic surgery. Twenty-five percent of the magazines contained messages regarding weight loss and dieting suggestions. Many women's magazines focus on how to lead a better life by improving physical appearance, while men's magazines provide information about hobbies, activities, and entertainment. When women are constantly exposed to ways to alter their appearance, they may over-internalize and feel pressure to look like the images they see.

The analyses of images in women's magazines observed from 1901 to 1980 and from 1959 to 1999 show that the featured models have become thinner over time, making the thin ideal even more difficult to achieve.

=== Women on television ===
According to researchers, 94% of females on television are thinner than the average women (168.5lbs) in the United States. It is normal in society today for women to work and provide an income, but it is still common for women on television to be portrayed in traditional female roles. According to the study done by Donald M. Davis, "While many of society's institutions have moved forward with respect to women, television may be lagging behind, at least as evidenced by demographic variables."

== Modeling ==
The top modeling and fashion industries often embrace the ultra-thin appearance. A majority of elite models are approximately 20% underweight, exceeding the anorexia nervosa indicator of 15% underweight. Fashion models and modeling agencies are often blamed for the societal pressures that cause young women to develop eating disorders. Others argue that modeling agencies and fashion cannot be blamed for the disordered eating behavior of easily influenced adolescents. However, after several incidents in which models died from anorexia nervosa, such as the case of Ana Carolina Reston, several major fashion modeling events have adopted new policies to encourage healthy body weights. For example, Madrid Fashion Week officials banned models with a body mass index lower than eighteen. Comparable guidelines have been adopted in similar fashion events in other countries, such as Brazil and Argentina.

== See also ==
- Anti-fat bias
- Female body shape
- Body image
- Size zero
