= Pretty Porky and Pissed Off =

Canadian performance art collective

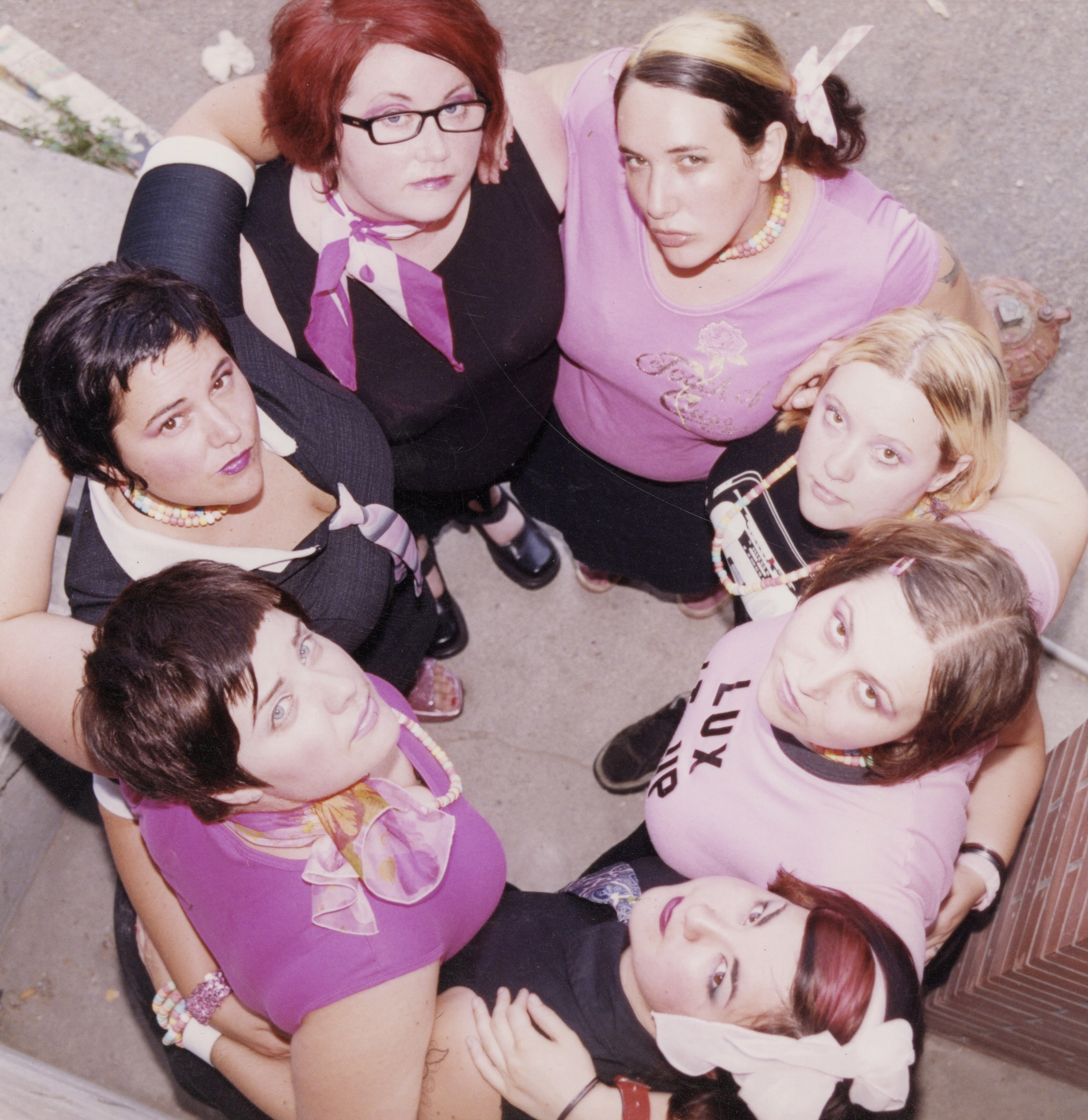
- Known for: Feminist, queer, LGBTQ, fat politics, performance art, activist artists
- Location: Canada

Art
- Style: Performance art
- Movement: Fat activism
- Notable works: Big Judy; Double Double zine series

Pretty Porky & Pissed Off (PPPO) was a Canadian fat activist and performance art collective based in Toronto, Ontario from 1996 to 2005. They used their bodies as modes of resistance against discriminatory language, cultural, social practices, and policies. Their feminist, queer, and LGBT politics were part of the DIY ethics of punk rock and the Riot Grrrl movement, and feminist activism. PPPO was a Canadian trailblazer in the international fat liberation movement.

== History ==
Pretty Porky and Pissed Off was founded by Mariko Tamaki, Allyson Mitchell, and Ruby Rowan in 1996, when they gathered friends and allies and staged their first performative political action on Queen Street West in the heart of Toronto's fashion district. As fat women playfully dressed in bright colours, polyester and camp, they asked passers by, “Do I look fat in these pants?” While this street performance called out a lack of desirable fat fashion available to fat people it was furthermore the humble beginnings of what was to become a long-term, collaborative, grassroots art activism project in the fat liberation movement that engaged radical ideas about the body at various intersections (including dimensions of the personal, political, physical, spiritual, emotional, as well as class, race, gender, sexuality, ability, health, and size).

Pretty Porky and Pissed Off's membership grew to include Lisa Ayuso, Gillian Bell, Joanne Huffa, Abi Slone, Tracy Tidgwell and Zoe Whittall. Together they collaborated on political and creative projects using performance, writing, and visual art. Known for both their satirical and sincere works as well as for their use of queer spectacle, they employed dance, skits, writing, spoken word, collage, crafting, zine-making and self-publishing, community organizing, photography, film and video in their works.

Pretty Porky and Pissed Off also engaged educational pursuits and gave workshops and lectures around Canada. In 2002 they were visiting lecturers at Laurentian University, in 2003 Abi Slone and Tracy Tidgwell presented a talk called "What's wrong with a little fat?" at Concordia University's series "University of the Streets Cafe: Feminist Controversies." From 2003 to 2004 PPPO was artist in residence with the Mayworks Festival Of Working People and toured performances and lectures in schools, colleges, and universities across Ontario as part of the Mayworks in the School Program.

== Fat politics and influences ==
Pretty Porky and Pissed Off took up feminist fat politics to challenge mainstream ideas about fatness and health, fatness and beauty, fatness and social worth to affirm that the fat body, and in fact every body, is desirable. "Every body is a good body," was a PPPO catchphrase. PPPO celebrated the fat body with pride and politicized it too by refusing diets and denial. PPPO's radical approach to understanding the body was groundbreaking in Canada however they were inspired by many international fat activist including the Fat Underground, Judy Freespirit, Cass Elliot, Elana Dykewomon, Judith Stein, the FatGiRL Magazine collective, Max Airborne, Sondra Solovay, Jill Andrew, Aisha Fairclough, Charlotte Cooper, Kay Hyatt, Nao Bustamante, Beth Ditto, Nomy Lamm, and Stacy Bias.

== Art and culture ==
PPPO was dedicated to political aesthetics through art, craft and performance. They were also dedicated community builders who regularly organized clothing swaps, parties, and gatherings in Toronto.

PPPO played to American audiences including NOLOSE and at New York City's queer experimental film festival, MIX, but it was in Toronto's queer arts scene that they found enduring popularity. PPPO collaborated with many Toronto artists including Keith Cole, Ina unt Ina, John Caffery (of Kids on TV), Will Munro, Kaleb Robertson, R.M. Vaughan and Christina Zeidler. PPPO performed at events like Cheap Queers, Strange Sisters, Inside Out's Local Heroes Party, Lisa Merchant's March of Dames at The Second City, Nightwood Theatre's FemCab, and Toronto's infamous queer club night, Vazaleen. In 2004 PPPO staged a multimedia theatre show, Big Judy, at Buddies in Bad Times Theatre.

Zoe Whittall dedicated her edited anthology, Geeks, Misfits and Outlaws: Short Fiction, to PPPO: "For Pretty Porky & Pissed Off - the best group of outlaws a girl could ever run with".

Allyson Mitchell's film, Free! Bake! Sale! (2004) documents Pretty Porky and Pissed Off's take on International No Diet Day outside a busy cafeteria.

Allyson Mitchell's 2013 immersive installation masterpiece, Kill Joy's Castle: A Lesbian Feminist Haunted House featured a graveyard of tombstones of feminist organizations past including one for Pretty Porky and Pissed Off marked "Pretty Porky & Pissed Off. Look young. Stay fat."

== External links to contemporary fat artists, teachers, and leaders ==
- Busting Out, a series of conversations that bridge fat liberation and prison industrial complex abolition: Wendi Moore-O’Neal, Mandisa Moore-O’Neal, and Kytara Epps on Carcerality, Punishment and Anti-Fatness. Caleb Luna and Sonalee Rashatwar on The Surveillance of Bodies. Shannon Perez-Darby and Cory Lira on Transformative Justice and Fat Liberation.
- Da' Shaun Harrison's book, Belly of the Beast: The Politics of Anti-Fatness as Anti-Blackness
- Caleb Luna
- Fat Rose,
- The Fat Lib Archive
- It Gets Fatter tumblr
- NOLOSE Conference
- NOLOSE : A response to white fat activism from People of Color in the fat justice movement
