= Fat feminism =

Social movement

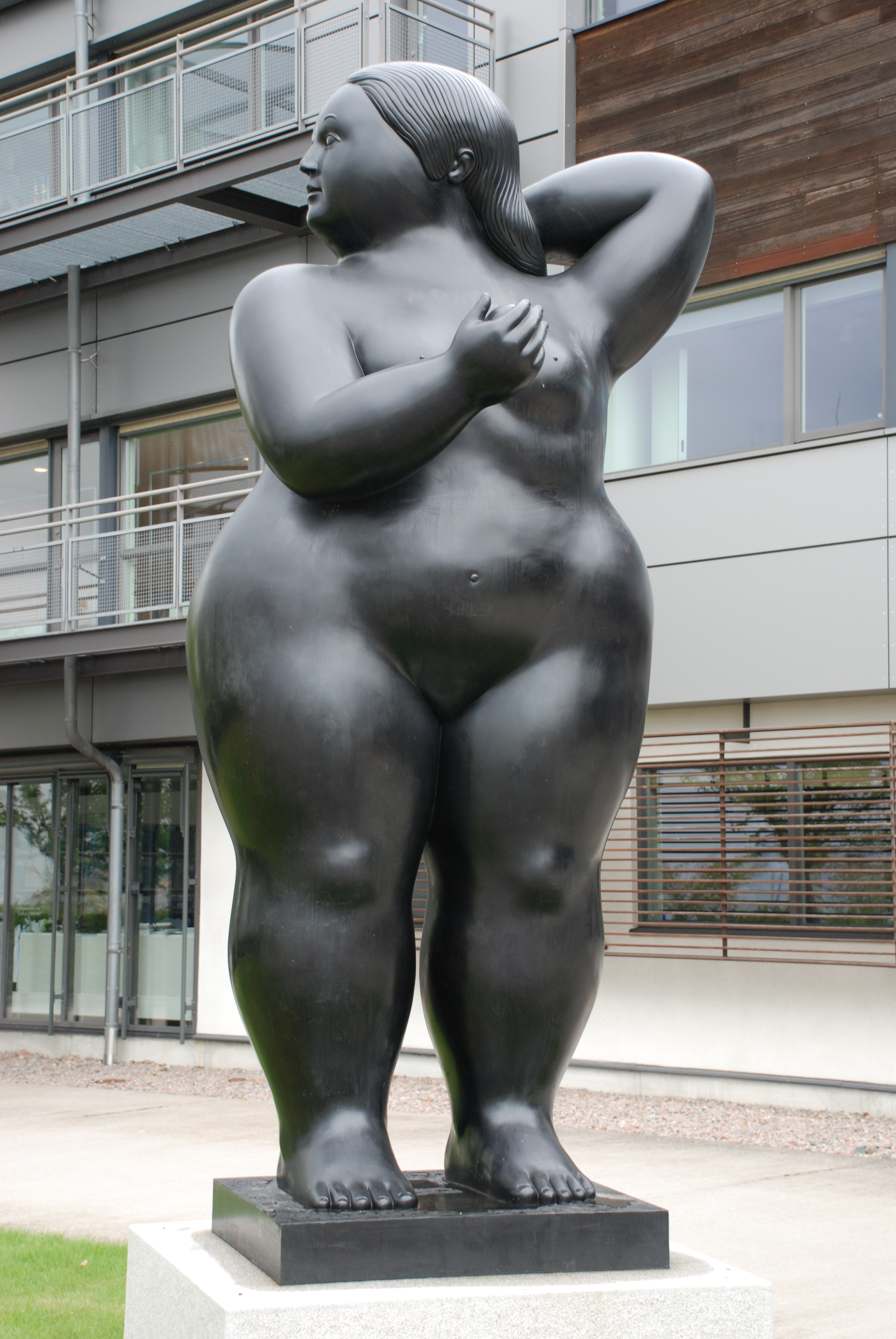
Sculpture by Fernando Botero

Fat feminism, often associated with "body-positivity", is a social movement that incorporates feminist themes of equality, social justice, and cultural analysis based on the weight of a woman or a non-binary feminine person. This branch of feminism intersects misogyny and sexism with anti-fat bias. Fat feminists advocate body-positive acceptance for all bodies, regardless of their weight, as well as eliminating biases experienced directly or indirectly by fat people. Fat feminists originated during third-wave feminism and is aligned with the fat acceptance movement. A significant portion of body positivity in the third-wave focused on embracing and reclaiming femininity, such as wearing makeup and high heels, even though the second-wave fought against these things. Contemporary western fat feminism works to dismantle oppressive power structures which disproportionately affect fat, queer, non-white, disabled, and other non-hegemonic bodies. It covers a wide range of topics such as diet culture, fat-phobia, representation in media, ableism, and employment discrimination.

== History ==
=== 1960s–1970s ===
Many outlets of fat feminism began originating in the late 1960s, but it is more commonly viewed as a product of third-wave feminism. When the fat feminists did not get support from the National Organization for Women, they established new organizations to advocate size acceptance, such as Fat Underground, the first Body Image Task Force of 1964, and the National Association to Advance Fat Acceptance (NAAFA) in 1969. Additionally, Lew Louderback's article "More People Should Be Fat!" was published in The Saturday Evening Post in 1967.

In 1973, Vivian Mayer and Judy Freespirit released the Fat Liberation Manifesto, which described size discrimination as sexism. Their efforts were met with mixed reactions during that decade, when very thin models, such as Twiggy, became fashionable. Some feminists, such as Gloria Steinem and Jane Fonda, believed that removing traits of "femaleness", such as feminine curves, was necessary for admittance to a male-dominated society.

Susie Orbach's Fat is a Feminist Issue, widely considered to be the first fat feminist book, was published in 1978.

=== 1980s–2000s ===
More organizations and publications against size discrimination were founded during this time. The first issue of Radiance: The Magazine for Large Women was published in 1984. Clothing brands and fashion magazines that targeted a plus-size audience became more common, but were not the norm in advertising. Critics have pointed out that while concern about eating disorders rose during the 1990s, some teen magazines used thin models to represent positive body image and healthy eating.

Fat feminists also filed lawsuits against diet programs for fraudulent claims. For instance, NAAFA found that 95-98% of diets fail within five years. NAAFA also notes that the medical industry began labeling 65 million Americans as "obese", subsequently developing new procedures, products, and pills to "cure" an obesity problem they created. As a result, feminists were also attempting to counter the medicalization of fatness. Similarly, due to the 1980s fitness boom, fat feminism had to fight the increasing popularity of the diet industry. By the late 1990s, Americans were spending over $40 billion on diet products and programs annually.

In the 1990s, fat feminism became increasingly popular. For the first time, fat feminism was officially supported by the National Organization for Women when the organization adopted an anti-size discrimination stance and started a body image task force. In 1992, Mary Evans Young, a size-positive activist in England, launched International No Diet Day, which continues to be an annual tradition.

In 1993, Toni Cassista filed a lawsuit against Community Foods, a store in Santa Cruz, California, when she was not hired because of her size. The California Supreme Court ruled in her favor, creating a precedent of discrimination based on weight. Currently, all other states can fire employees for gaining weight due to at-will employment. A study from Yale University shows that 10 percent of women and 5 percent of men experience weight discrimination at work.

During the 1990s, the zine, the riot grrrl, and the Fat Liberation movements converged for young activists, resulting in the publication of numerous fat feminist zines. Among these were Fat!So?: for people who don't apologize for their size by Marilyn Wann, I'm So Fucking Beautiful by Nomy Lamm, and Fat Girl: a zine for fat dykes and the women who want them produced by The Fat Girl Collective in San Francisco from 1994 to 1997.

In 1996, a Toronto-based activist and performance art troupe Pretty Porky and Pissed Off (PPPO) was founded by Allyson Mitchell, Ruby Rowan, and Mariko Tamaki. PPPO's purpose was to cultivate positive representations and messages of fat folk through performance. It grew to include other members and worked as a collective until 2005 publishing their zine series, Double Double. Nomy Lamm was named by Ms. Magazine as a "Woman of the Year" in 1997, "For inspiring a new generation of feminists to fight back against fat oppression." In 1999 Marilyn Wann expanded her zine into the book Fat!So?: Because You Don't Have to Apologize for Your Size. In 2005, former Fat Girl collective members Max Airborne and Cherry Midnight published Size Queen: for Queen-Sized Queers and our Loyal Subjects.

In the late-90s, the Health At Every Size (HAES) approach began developing and was incorporated into weight-neutral businesses. The HAES belief system rejects dieting and the weight-based paradigm of health. This system has been adopted by many fat feminists. Some businesses used this approach to rethink exercise, promote movement for the sake of movement rather than weight loss, and to emphasize listening to body cues. Among some of these were Lisa Tealer and Dana Schuster's 1997 Women of Substance Health Spa in California and Pat Lyons' Great Shape fitness classes at Kaiser Permanente.

The Body Positive was founded by Elizabeth Scott and Connie Sobczak in 1996. It was created to help "people develop balanced, joyful self-care and a relationship with their whole selves that is guided by love, forgiveness, and humor."

In 1998, NAAFA hosted a Million Pound March in Los Angeles to protest the discrimination and harassment of fat bodies.

=== 2000s–2010s ===
The HAES approach continued developing, and using this method, the Association for Size Diversity and Health was founded in 2003.

The 2000s saw an increase in internet feminism and internet fat activism, which have often converged, as some have argued that this makes participating in movements more inclusive, accessible, and wide reaching. The fat acceptance blogosphere has been dubbed the "fatosphere" and has enjoyed some positive publicity in mainstream publications. Kate Harding and Marianne Kirby, who are prominent fat bloggers, released a cowritten self-help book in 2009 called Lessons from the Fat-o-sphere: Quit Dieting and Declare a Truce with Your Body, which is devoted to different topics, including body positivity, health at every size, and intuitive eating. Beth Ditto, frontwoman for the punk band The Gossip, attained celebrity status in the mid-2000s with the popularity of her band's 2006 album Standing in the Way of Control, which also helped raise awareness for the movement.

During this time period the general public mindset still disputed diet-culture, the medicalization of fatness, the pathologizing of fat bodies, and pushed back against sentiments of the "obesity epidemic". As a response to weight-based prejudice, more workers began filing lawsuits against their employers for discrimination in the workplace. Through experience, many workers found that most states do not have specific laws to prevent weight bias. They also highlighted that hurtful practices were allowed to be enforced because of loopholes in anti-discriminatory laws which were not specific enough to protect them. For instance, in 2013, 22 waitresses at the Borgata Hotel Casino & and Spa in Atlantic City took their case to court because their employer had been making the women take laxatives. Their boss even held mandatory weigh-ins and prohibited them from gaining above 7% of their total body weight.

=== 2010s–today ===
Shortly after President Obama started his first term, First Lady Michelle Obama began a campaign called "Let's Move" to draw attention to obesity in America and encourage people to work out, eat healthily, and lose weight. However, this campaign has been criticized for using medicalized and pathologized sentiments of fatness, using weight-loss ideologies as universal goal, and not addressing the bullying and discrimination fat people of all ages experience.

During this era body-positivity began appearing in consumerism. In 2015, retail company Lane Bryant launched the #ImNoAngel campaign in direct response to Victoria's Secret's preference for mainstream beauty standards. The campaign began with a diverse array of plus-size models sharing the fact that they feel sexy in Cacique, Lane Bryant's underwear line. According to company CEO Linda Heasley "Our #ImNoAngel campaign is designed to empower ALL women to love every part of herself. In conjunction with the campaign, LB also started the #ImNoAngel Challenge which paired with I Am B.E.A.U.T.I.F.U.L.™, a nonprofit dedicated to building self-esteem and leadership skills in young girls and women. LB announced it would match up to $100,000 during the campaign. Dove also responded the Victoria's Secret "Love My Body" advertisement by starting the Dove Real Beauty Campaign. However, Dove's response has been criticized for misusing body-positivity as individual body acceptance and for shaming other women's bodies. Additionally, their ads have been critiqued as non-inclusive, because internalization of a thin-ideal may result in advertisers using average-sized, able-bodies in place of a slim body as a way to falsely promote acceptance.

In 2016, Mattel released "Curvy Barbie". This line of Barbies included dolls that were all shapes, sizes, and different ethnicities. When asked the company said, "Getting rid of Barbie's thigh gap is part of 'evolving the images that come to mind when people talk about Barbie'." The company also says they are "listening to what girls are talking about."

At the beginning of 2017, there was a new trend for fat feminists and body-positive activists to take control of how their fat was seen. This is largely being done on social media. For instance, the hashtag #Don'tHateTheShake was created by Melissa Gibson in 2015. Videos are posted on social media with this hashtag of people of any body type, but mainly fat bodies, shaking, moving, dancing, and having fun. The purpose is to celebrate all bodies and encourage body-positivity. It gained traction from Megan Jayne Crabbe, who spreads body positivity on social media. Crabbe has published a book about body positivity called Body Positive Power.

Many movements have also began as a response to the exclusivity of mainstream fashion shows such as Victoria's Secret shows. Many people have started their own fashion walks in the middle of busy streets, often featuring differently sized bodies. Crabbe has taken part in these movements also. For instance, in February 2018, Crabbe and others walked across Oxford Street in undergarments whilst holding signs calling for more fat representation in fashion. Similarly, KhrystyAna founded #theREALcatwalk, which centers the non-hegemonic body, and in December 2018 had more than 200 participants. Rihanna's lingerie line Savage X Fenty included models of multiple races and bodies. In May 2018, this lingerie line made bra sizes up to 44DDD available.

Many people also incorporate social media into their projects such as Sara Guerts' Red Body Positive Swimsuit Shoot in April 2018, which featured a wide range of body types and disabled people. Jameela Jamil, the founder of iWeigh, fought Instagram to change their policies on diet culture in advertisements and regular posts. As of September 2019, if a picture shows a weight-loss product or cosmetic procedure that cost money, viewers below the age of 18 will not be able to see the post. Similarly, Instagram will be removing posts which make a "miraculous claim" about the products or diets shown.

== Intersections with other forms of feminism and studies ==
=== Fat feminism and women of color in the United States ===
The intersection of race, gender, and bodily discrimination mean large women of color may experience bias differently than their white female counterparts. Many women of color often do not view being overweight as being synonymous with being unattractive. They further state that large women of color use their weight and personal style as a way to counter dominant beauty standards that have historically been defined by resource-rich countries' standards. This can include having natural hair or dreadlocks for Black women as well as embracing larger and curvier figures. Research suggests that women of color, as well as communities of color in general, may consider more body types attractive than white beauty standards. However, because women of color are often excluded from fat positivity and acceptance movements, many have turned to social media as a way of finding inclusion within the movements. Some fat women of color resist dominant beauty standards by creating intersectional frameworks for accepting fat women of all identities. Fat women of color work to resist fetishization by the male gaze or those giving unwanted health advice, while also creating positive and accepting spaces for themselves.

=== Intersections with queer studies ===
Rossi's analysis also applies to queer feminism in that queer and fat folk, especially those of color, will experience differing levels of societal and institutional consequences. Rossi finds that this is often a result of anti-fat prejudice in anti-obesity sentiments which specifically targets queer and fat folk of color. For instance, Bianca D. M. Wilson has shared experiences of other people assuming she will suffer an early death due to her body size, and they will then compare those outcomes with her likelihood of death due to her position as a queer Black woman. This reinforces fat phobia by targeting marginalized bodies, meaning fatphobia and homophobia are uniquely intertwined.

Many of the authors in Shadow on a Tightrope: Writings By Women on Fat Oppression (1983) are lesbians, and many were involved in lesbian feminism. Their experience of being overweight is seen as distinct from that of heterosexual women given the experience of combined discrimination based on their sex, size, and sexual orientation.

Some queer individuals have not yet participated in or supported fat feminism because it has been argued that societal and cultural attitudes of body size will not change beliefs about queerness.

=== Intersections with disability studies ===
Some outlets of body-positivity have excluded and overlooked disabled persons in activism. As a response, people like Keah Brown are starting movements such as the hashtag #disabledandcute to ensure that everyone is included fat feminism. Similarly, those who are disabled and/or experience chronic illness are not often represented in media, meaning activist projects such as Brown's hashtag creates space for more people to find positive relationships with themselves and their bodies.

=== Intersections with media studies ===
The media plays a large role both in creating and reproducing sociocultural values of bodies. For instance, some have analyzed the role of the body in fashion advertisements, illustrating that those who are represented as ideal through clothes are thin, hegemonically valued women. Subsequently, because of the limited representations of bodies in ads, there may be potentialities for serious health concerns stemming from body image issues. Similarly, when assessing the presence of diet advertisements in social media, research suggests that media influence can lead users to attempt to achieve a culturally valued body, which can result in disorder eating, unsafe dieting, and other forms of harmful weight loss behaviors and/or deteriorating relationships with food and self.

According to Apryl Williams, 14% of prime-time television programming portrayed 'overweight' or 'obese' women.

Media studies have also been able to critique body-positive advertisements, such as the Dove Real Beauty Campaign. This may reveal a misuse of the term body-positivity, however the effects of acceptance ads are relatively unknown. Considering the influential power of the media, fat-positive representation may start to bring change in cultural values of thinness, however are not yet present enough to make this shift. Similarly, body-positive advertisements, just like thin-ideal advertisements, evoke strong emotional responses, both positive and negative. The positive would be that viewers may be prompted to positively view their body, however this may even cause guilt for not loving one's own body the same way an ad is promoting.

These intersections reveal the power and influence of media, which has a strong potential to change individual behavior for better or for worse.

=== Intersections with education ===
Bullying is a common occurrence in schools, and yet when it comes to bullying body size, the adults tolerate if not perpetuate this type of bullying. Hannah McNinch found from her own research in her classroom that the school environment only furthered the oppression experienced by fat youth. The inclusion of physical education and activity is the first theme that McNinch noticed in her research, and many students claimed they tried to lose weight to fit in more. The second theme is the fact that when it came to assigning responsibility for the bullying, the blame landed on the victim and their "horrible lifestyle". The final part of McNinch's research suggested that students who were bullied about their weight could perpetuate the cycle of bullying with their own students.

== Associated theories ==
A theory presented by Michel Foucault in his book The Perverse Implantation suggests that society plants ideas inside the minds of individuals which creates industries and in turn controls the people and their belief system. This is much like the dieting industry, built to help people overweight become "normal" which in Western society, the goal is to be thin or curvy, not fat. Weight Watchers, Nutrisystem, DetoxTea, and surgical weight loss options, are all tailored towards losing weight, and such ideas are what fat feminists and body-positive activists resist. Laura S. Brown, the author of Fat Oppression and Psychotherapy, says that being overweight is not unhealthy. The standards that we hold overweight individuals to, is what is considered unhealthy for these individuals. Bulimia, anorexia, depression, and anxiety, are all believed to be brought on because of the standards that society has over those considered social outsiders.

Additionally, the theory of the panopticon has been applied to fat media studies. Panopticonism explains self-policing behavior to accommodate for potential societal monitoring, even if one cannot physically see or identify the onlooker. In media, the panopticon serves to control women's bodies through the heteropatriarchy, which can result in people modifying their behavior. This can have detrimental affects such as negative self-worth, eating disorders, and other forms of harmful relationships with food and self.

A similar analysis of heteropatriarchy in fashion advertisements reveal the ways in which media perpetuates heteronormative notions of femininity. The media often creates impossible-to-achieve standards of feminine beauty, meaning people may begin to self-police their own behavior as well as monitor other people's behaviors. According to Sandra Lee Bartsky, because fashion operates on a thin ideal, the media becomes an outlet through which gender performance is strictly limited and may influence who is allowed to take up space and how much. She argues that as such, performing hegemonic femininity is tied to body size, meaning that fat femme folk are often viewed as the antithesis of femininity.

== How body size ties to feminism ==
There are many reasons why large body sizes can be a feminist issue. Although the word fat simply refers to a bigger body size, it has become associated with words such as ugly, lazy, and undesirable. This has dominated Western culture through the pursuit of a healthy body which has been deemed to be thin. Women have become the majority of the population seeking this ideal body as messages from the media continue to demonize fatness. Negative depictions of large body sizes push the narrative that fat is a problem to be shamed for. Such negative depictions are instilled within anti-obesity campaigns that overwhelmingly use images of fat women.

Fat feminism addresses obesity as a feminist issue because women, specifically African American and poor women, are more likely to be obese. However, "obese" is a term coined by the medical community, which often seeks to develop new products and procedures to fix an epidemic they caused. Similarly, marginalized bodies are often the targets of weight-loss sentiments. The intersection of body size with race and socioeconomic status, represents concerns over environmental policy issues. Relating to this is the idea that socioeconomic status may create a lack of access to fresh produce and goods.

The stigma attached to fat women is connected to the feminist movement because feminism, at its core, works to attain equality between the sexes in all aspects of life. Fat feminism works to achieve equality between the sexes and combat the oppressive nature of "thin privilege" as fat women receive a disproportionate amount of negative treatment due to their body size. The intersections of being large and being a woman is at the heart of fat feminism because discrimination and prejudice often occur as a result of gender and body type. The points above that connect fatness to feminism revolve around the varying experiences that body type can produce when combined with socioeconomic status, race, gender, sexual orientation, and other identities.

== Criticism ==
Critics of fat feminism have stated that there are significant issues with the movement, many of which deal with exclusion and representation. One such criticism is that fat feminism can result in the body shaming and exclusion of people with other body types, as in fat studies there is sometimes a privilege for an overweight girl, and a disadvantage for a thin girl. Other critics of fat feminism and body positive movements have stated that the movements overlook people who are not white, fat, and able-bodied females. This has resulted in the movements being called ableist, as people with disabilities are often been excluded from dominant discourse and action. Similarly women of color experience the same issues as they are not represented nearly as frequently as white women within the movement. Exclusion based upon gender has also been expressed, as critics state that the movements overlook how masculinity is tied to body size and men are infrequently represented.

Scholars such as Ashley Kraus and Amara Miller have also commented on how the term body positivity is often seen to mean individual body acceptance and as such, does nothing towards dismantling power structures which directly affect non-hegemonic bodies.

Because of this criticism, intersectional fat feminists such as Crabbe and other influencers have begun to voice how the body positivity movement has direct ties to fat feminism.

== See also ==
- Body image
- Fat acceptance movement
- International No Diet Day
- International Size Acceptance Association
- Charlotte Cooper
- Nomy Lamm
- Self-image
- Big Beautiful Woman

== Bibliography ==
- Malson, Helen and Burns, Maree, eds. Critical Feminist Approaches to Eating Dis/Orders, Routledge, 2009.
- Murray, Samantha. The 'Fat' Female Body, Palgrave Macmillan, 2008.
- Orbach, Susan. Fat Is a Feminist Issue, Arrow Books; New edition, 2006.
- Bordo, Susan. Unbearable Weight: Feminism, Western Culture, and the Body, Tenth Anniversary Edition, University of California Press, 2004.
- Braziel, Jana Evans and LeBesco, Kathleen. Bodies out of Bounds: Fatness and Transgression, University of California Press, 2001.
- Manton, Catherine. Fed Up: Women and Food in America, Praeger, 1999.
- Malson, Hellen. The Thin Woman: Feminism, Post-structuralism and the Social Psychology of Anorexia Nervosa (Women and Psychology), Routledge, 1997.
- Cole, Ellen and Rothblum, Esther D. and Thone, Ruth R. Fat: A Fate Worse Than Death? : Women, Weight, and Appearance (Haworth Innovations in Feminist Studies), Routledge, 1997.
- Hirschmann, Jane R. When Women Stop Hating Their Bodies: Freeing Yourself from Food and Weight Obsession, Ballantine Books, 1996.
- Fallon, Patricia and Katzman, Melanie A. and Wooley, Susan C., eds. Feminist Perspectives on Eating Disorders, The Guilford Press, 1996.
- MacSween, Morag. Anorexic Bodies: A Feminist and Sociological Perspective on Anorexia Nervosa, Routledge, 1995.
- Rothblum, Esther D. and Brown, Laura. Fat Oppression and Psychotherapy: A Feminist Perspective, Routledge, 1990.
- Parker, Patricia A. Literary Fat Ladies: Rhetoric, Gender, Property, Methuen, 1988.
- Harding, Kate and Kirby, Marianne. Lessons from the Fat-o-sphere: Quit Dieting and Declare a Truce with Your Body, 2009.
- Various. Shadow on a Tightrope: Writings by Women on Fat Oppression, Aunt Lute Books, 1995.
- Frater, Lara. Fat Chicks Rule!: How To Survive in a Thin-Centric World, Gamble Guides, 2005.
- Farrell Erdman, Amy. Fat Shame: Stigma and the Fat Body in American Culture, 2011.
- Shaw Elizabeth, Andrea. The Embodiment of Disobedience: Fat Black Women's Unruly Political Bodies, Lexington Books, 2006.
- Kinzel, Lesley. Two Whole Cakes: How to Stop Dieting and Learn to Love Your Body, The Feminist Press, 2012.
- Goodman, Charisse. The Invisible Woman: Confronting Weight Prejudice in America
- Williams, A.A. Fat People of Color: Emergent Intersectional Discourse Online. Soc. Sci. 2017, 6, 15.
- Russell, Constance, and Keri Semenko. Twenty One: We Take "Cow" as a Compliment: Fattening Humane, Environmental, and Social Justice Education. Counterpoints, vol. 467, 2016, pp. 211 - 220. JSTOR, www.jstor.org/stable/45157145
