= Hanne Blank =

Historian, writer, editor, activist

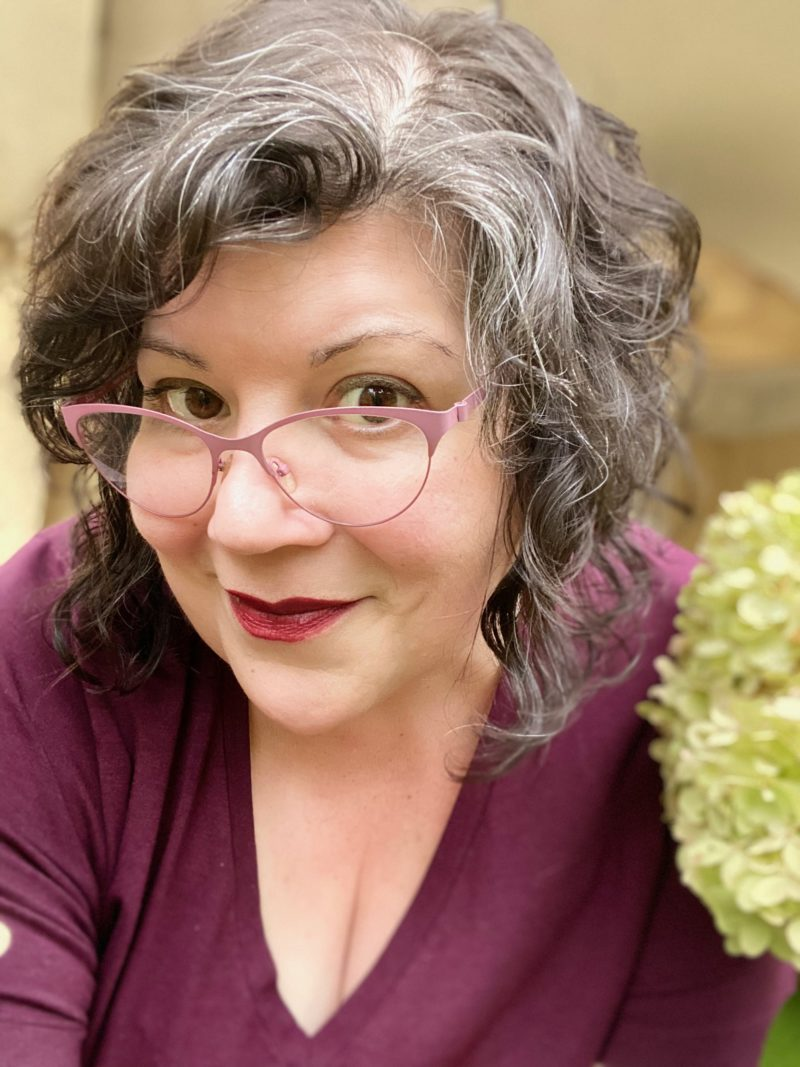
- Hanne Blank, by Hanne Blank
- Born: Northampton, Massachusetts, U.S.
- Occupations: Historian, writer, editor, activist
- Writing career
- Period: Contemporary
- Genres: Fiction and Non-fiction
- Subjects: History of science, history of medicine, virginity, sexuality
- Website: www.hanneblank.com

Hanne Blank, also known as Hanne Blank Boyd, is an American historian, writer, and editor. Her written works include Virgin: The Untouched History, Straight: The Surprisingly Short History of Heterosexuality, and The Unapologetic Fat Girl's Guide to Exercise and Other Incendiary Acts.

== Biography ==
Hanne Blank was born in Northampton, Massachusetts and grew up in the greater Cleveland, Ohio area. She is a classically trained musician and a formally educated historian. As a musician, she was a Fellow of the Boston University Tanglewood Institute and was the 1991 recipient of the George Whitefield Chadwick medal for work as a proponent of contemporary art music upon graduating from New England Conservatory. She received the Ph.D. in History from Emory University.

Her first book, Big Big Love: A Sourcebook for People of Size and Those Who Love Them, was published by Greenery Press. She became an editor of the defunct Scarletletters.com, which gave rise to the award-winning independent sex education website Scarleteen, where she was also a contributing editor and which is still owned and run by Heather Corinna. In 2003, her book Unruly Appetites was published by Seal Press. Her history of virginity, Virgin: The Untouched History, was published in 2007 by Bloomsbury Press.

As an independent scholar, she was a 2004-2005 Scholar of the Institute For Teaching and Research on Women at Towson University, Maryland. As an instructor, she has taught at the university level at Brandeis University, Tufts University and Whitworth College. From 2017 to 2022, she was Visiting Assistant Professor in Women's and Gender Studies at Denison University.

In 2012, she published Straight: The Surprisingly Short History of Heterosexuality, which begins with her own life experience and then explores a history of late 19th and early 20th century construction of the concept of sexuality. In 2012, she also published The Unapologetic Fat Girl’s Guide to Exercise and Other Incendiary Acts, and explained in an interview with Curve, "Moving your body for your own reasons, taking pleasure in moving your body, is incendiary for fat women because fat women's bodies aren't seen as deserving of that care, that attention, or that freedom to move and take up space in the world." In 2022, her book Fat was released as part of the Object Lessons series from Bloomsbury.

== Selected works ==
=== Fiction ===
- Zaftig: Well-Rounded Erotica. Cleis Press, 2001. ISBN 978-1-57344-122-3
- Shameless: Women's Intimate Erotica. Seal Press, 2002. ISBN 978-1-58005-060-9
- Unruly Appetites. Seal Press, 2003. ISBN 978-1-58005-081-4

=== Non-fiction ===
- Big, Big Love: A Sourcebook on Sex for People of Size and Those Who Love Them. Greenery Press, 2000. ISBN 1-890159-16-6 ISBN 978-1-890159-16-0
- Virgin: The Untouched History. Bloomsbury USA, 2007. ISBN 978-1-59691-010-2
- Straight: The Surprisingly Short History of Heterosexuality. Beacon, 2012. ISBN 9780807044438
- The Unapologetic Fat Girl's Guide to Exercise and Other Incendiary Acts. Ten Speed. 2012. ISBN 978-1-60774-286-9.
- "FAT" in Object Lessons Bloomsbury, USA 2020, ISBN 978-1-5013-3328-6

== Critical reception ==
=== Big Big Love: A Sourcebook on Sex for People of Size and Those Who Love Them ===
In a 2001 review for the Journal of Sex Education and Therapy, Martha Cornog writes, "Blank starts out by debunking the cultural truism in America that sex and fat don't mix." The revised edition, published in 2011, was reviewed by Sheila Addison in Fat Studies.

=== Virgin: The Untouched History ===
In a 2007 review for The New York Times, Alex Kuczynski describes Virgin: The Untouched History as "quite a different animal" from Blank's past work as an erotica author and editor, and "A well-researched history of virginity, it veers from the medical (who knew there are five different types of hymens?) to the pop-cultural (discussions of "Beverly Hills 90210," the movie "Little Darlings" and so on) to the scholarly (dissections of Christian theology, 19th-century British social policy and the like)." A review from Publishers Weekly states, "Blank, an independent scholar, has pieced together a history of how humans have constructed the idea of virginity (almost always female and heterosexual) and engineered its uses to suit cultural and political forces."

In a review for the San Francisco Chronicle, Bob Blaisdell writes, "Though scholarly, Hanne Blank's "Virgin: The Untouched History" treats her topic with a writer's, not an academic's, interest. That is, she's curious about and surprised by what she discovers, and keeps the book moving along at a reader's pace." Ellen D. Gilbert writes for Library Journal it is "a very good book", but "The reader in search of a chronological or carefully delineated thematic approach to the subject will be disappointed." In a review for Booklist, Annie Tully writes, "This is also strictly a Western history, with modern-day "honor killings" not mentioned until the epilogue. [...] Perhaps Blank's next treatise will provide a needed further look at this complex and significant topic."

=== Straight: The Surprisingly Short History of Heterosexuality ===
In a 2011 review of Straight: The Surprisingly Short History of Heterosexuality, Kirkus Reviews writes, "In this chronicle of changing sexual mores, the author challenges the common preconception today that the distinction between homosexuality and heterosexuality is legitimate" and "The author uses wisdom and wit to substantiate her contention that love and passion are not definable by biology." A review from Publishers Weekly states, "From its thorough but brisk explorations of sexual orientation’s intersections with sex, gender, and romance, this illuminating study examines our presuppositions and makes a powerful, provocative argument that heterosexuality—mazy, unscientific, and new—may be merely "a particular configuration of sex and power in a particular historical moment.""

In a review for Library Journal, Jennifer Stout writes, "Adding to the expanding body of knowledge about the history and sociology of sexual identity, Blank has produced a challenging, clear, and interesting study of how Western views of what it means to be "straight" have changed over the past two centuries and continue to change." George de Stefano writes in a review for the New York Journal of Books that Blank's approach to the topic "will be familiar to anyone who has read Michel Foucault or any of his many intellectual progeny" and the book "is indebted to Jonathan Ned Katz, whom she cites, and if she adds little to Katz's account besides more recent references and a personal perspective on the topic, Straight nonetheless is accessible and engaging, often witty and penetrating in its insights."

Ryan Linkof writes for Journal of Social History, "A crucial aspect of her critique of heterosexuality stems from her clever undoing of the premise that heterosexuality must exist because it is necessary for reproduction." In The Baltimore Sun, Laura Dattaro writes, "Because heterosexuality is presumed "normal," it often escapes the sort of examination to which homosexuality is subjected", and "Blank calls the accepted state into question, and in doing so undermines its relevance." In a review for the Journal of Gay & Lesbian Mental Health, Sharon Scales Rostosky writes, "Blank reveals to us the doxa of heterosexuality, the socially constructed but invisible walls that threaten to keep us stuck in claustrophobic rooms that limit us intellectually, scientifically, socially, and politically."

=== The Unapologetic Fat Girl’s Guide to Exercise and Other Incendiary Acts ===
A 2012 review of The Unapologetic Fat Girl’s Guide to Exercise and Other Incendiary Acts by Publishers Weekly states, "In this empowering and informative book Blank contends that it's a fat woman’s birthright to move and enjoy her body." Pauline Baughman writes in a review for Library Journal, "This unique guide is anything but a diet and exercise book."

=== Fat ===
In a 2020 review for Fat Studies, Jenna M. Wilson writes, "At once historical, personal, analytical, scientific, and humorous, Fat shifts seamlessly from concrete data [...] to scenes from Blank's bedroom, gym locker room, and high school bathroom. The tone of Fat is casual and ahem, digestible, while also providing a succinct and significant overview of fatness and some of the issues most relevant to the burgeoning field of fat studies."

== See also ==
- Body image
- Fat acceptance
- Fat feminism
- Human sexuality
- Virginity
