= Intuitive eating =

Approach to food

Intuitive eating is an approach to eating that focuses on the body's response to cues of hunger and satisfaction. It aims to foster a positive relationship with food as opposed to pursuing "weight control". Additionally, intuitive eating aims to change users' views about dieting, health, and wellness, instilling a more holistic approach. It also helps to create a positive attitude and relationship towards food, physical activity, and the body.

The term "intuitive eating", coined by registered dietitians Evelyn Tribole and Elyse Resch, first appeared in a 1990s peer-reviewed journal article. In 2012, Tribole's and Resch's book Intuitive Eating: A Revolutionary Program that Works was published, identifying ten components of intuitive eating and reviewing the scientific research that has been conducted on it.

== Characteristics ==
Unlike most diets, intuitive eating does not try to ban or restrict certain foods, with its mindset being that food should not be looked at as "good or bad". Practitioners are instead encouraged to listen to their body and eat what feels right for them.

Intuitive eating follows 10 guidelines:

1. Reject the diet mentality
2. Honor your hunger
3. Make peace with food
4. Challenge the food police
5. Feel your fullness
6. Discover the satisfaction factor
7. Cope with your emotions without using food
8. Respect your body
9. Exercise
10. Honor your health

== Research ==
=== Weight loss and chronic disease control ===
Intuitive eating is not designed with an intention to lose weight (as a HAES aligned approach); however, some studies suggest it may lead to some short-term weight loss, and to decrease weight significantly more than in control groups that had no diet intervention, most likely caused by healing relationship with food and reduced eating for non-physical hunger. Long-term weight loss from intuitive eating might be possible, but this possibility is not yet well-studied.

Based on observational studies, intuitive eating is associated with less frequent overeating and better self-regulation in terms of calorie consumption. Due to the methodology of those studies, causality cannot be inferred and intuitive eating could be a consequence of low body weight rather than its prerequisition.

Intuitive eating may be equally effective as a diabetes self-management education (DSME) and a lifestyle weight loss program, although further research is needed, as only similar approaches such as mindfulness eating were tested in clinical trials.

In overweight or obese pregnant women, mindfulness eating was shown to lower glucose levels. Whether these results can be extrapolate to the similar, but still different approach of intuitive eating, is unclear.

Intuitive eating may help to lower cholesterol and fasting glucose levels, improve HbA_{1C} levels, and lower systolic and diastolic blood pressure.

In a study from 2022 a lifestyle intervention that focused on weight loss resulted in a similar increase in intuitive eating as the control group. Weight loss correlated with two out of four subdomains of intuitive eating (body–food choice congruence and unconditional permission to eat). However, this results leaves open whether stronger intuitive eating was a result of weight loss or its requirement.

=== Disordered eating and body acceptance ===
Intuitive eating may help to decrease eating disorder symptoms and behaviors as well as decrease weight stigma and concerns about weight.

A 2022 review found that intuitive eating helped to decrease dieting.

A 2016 review found that it correlated with self-esteem and self-compassion. Another review found that it could lead to improved quality of life, body image, and body appreciation.

A 2019 study revealed that women who followed intuitive eating patterns were able to let go of the concepts of "good" and "bad" foods that are commonly promoted by diet culture, allowing them to eat a more balanced, sustainable, and non-restrictive diet.

== Drawbacks and limitations ==
Intuitive eating has shown growth as a possible method for losing weight and yielding health benefits. However, researchers warn that there is not enough research to support that it can assist with weight loss long-term, or with maintaining weight loss. Furthermore, doctors and registered dietitians warn that this "non-diet" diet approach will yield different results for different people.

People with certain health conditions may be instructed by their doctor to follow a particular diet, eliminating the choice to follow an intuitive eating diet. Critics have also argued that because intuitive eating is so broad, with no given diet plan or food restrictions, it can be hard for some users to know what to eat and how much to eat. It can be a steep learning curve to accurately respond to one's hunger and fullness cues.

== See also ==
- Health at Every Size
- Human nutrition
- Body positivity
