= Fatso =

Fatso may refer to:

== Animals ==
- The proper name of Keyboard Cat, a cat who became the subject of an Internet meme
- Fatso (crocodile), a saltwater crocodile in captivity in Western Australia

== Arts, entertainment, and media ==
=== Fictional characters ===
- Sergeant "Fatso" Judson, a character in the 1953 American film From Here to Eternity
- Fatso, a member of the Ghostly Trio and one of Casper the Friendly Ghost's uncles
- Fatso, a wombat from the Australian television series A Country Practice
- The Mancubus or Fatso, a character in the video game Doom II
- Fatso the Fat-Arsed Wombat, an unofficial mascot for the Sydney 2000 Summer Olympics

=== Films ===
- Fatso (1980 film), an American film directed by Anne Bancroft
- Fatso (2008 film), a Norwegian film directed by Arild Fröhlich
- Fatso!, a 2012 Indian film directed by Rajat Kapoor

=== Literature ===
- Fatso, a 1987 autobiography by retired American football player Art Donovan
- FAT!SO?, a 1998 book by Marilyn Wann

=== Music ===
- Fatso (band), a band who featured on the TV series Rutland Weekend Television

== People ==
- Leonard DiMaria (born 1941), New York mobster nicknamed Fatso
- Vincenzo Licciardi (born 1965), Italian criminal clan boss nicknamed "'o Chiatto" (Fatso)

== Other uses ==
- FTO gene, or Fatso, a gene linked to obesity and type 2 diabetes
- Fatso the Fat-Arsed Wombat, an unofficial mascot of the Sydney 2000 Olympics
- Fatso (service), an online DVD rental service in New Zealand
