= ISAA =

Isaa or ISAA may refer to:

- Indian Scale for Assessment of Autism, a clinical test
- Inter-Scholastic Athletic Association, an athletic sport organization in the Philippines
- International Size Acceptance Association, a United States-based non-governmental organization
