= International No Diet Day =

Annual celebration of body acceptance

International No Diet Day (also known as National No Diet Day or simply No Diet Day) is an annual celebration dedicated to body positivity and the rejection of diet culture. It is observed globally in a number of countries, including the United Kingdom, United States, Canada, Australia, New Zealand, India, Israel, Denmark, Sweden, and Brazil.

International No Diet Day is observed on 6 May.

== Goals ==
Participants aim to:

- Challenge diet culture
- Promote healthy relationships with food
- Raise questions about the safety and efficacy of commercial diets
- Avoid fixating over their own body weight for the day

== Criticism ==
In its book Weighing the Options: Criteria for Evaluating Weight Management Programs, the Institute of Medicine's Committee to Develop Criteria for Evaluating the Outcomes of Approaches to Prevent and Treat Obesity states that "the intractability of obesity" has led to the anti-dieting movement. The authors comment, regarding International No-Diet Day and similar movements,

We agree, of course, that there should be more appreciation and acceptance of diversity in the physical attributes of people, more discouragement of dieting in vain attempts to attain unrealistic physical ideals, and no obsession with weight loss by individuals who are at or near desirable or healthy weights. However, it is inappropriate to argue that obese individuals should simply accept their body weight and not attempt to reduce, particularly if the obesity is increasing their risk for developing other medical problems or diseases.

== History ==
International No Diet Day was first observed in the United Kingdom. British feminist Mary Evans Young is credited with starting the movement, inspired by her own struggles with body acceptance and anorexia.

The first No Diet Day was held on 5 May 1992. It was a small affair to be celebrated by a dozen women with a picnic in Hyde Park, London. Ages ranged from 21 to 76 and they all wore stickers saying: "Ditch That Diet". It rained, and so Young held the picnic in her home. She soon sought to make the date an international holiday.

Americans, particularly those in California, Texas, New Mexico, and Arizona, were concerned that the date clashed with the Cinco de Mayo celebrations in the southern states. Young agreed to change the date to the following day in subsequent years.

== Present day ==
Today, the celebration has evolved into a social media based campaign, sponsored by the National Eating Disorders Association. Observances typically include posting either graphics with statistics provided by NEDA or photos of food to social media platforms under the hashtag "#NoDietDay". It is also sometimes embraced as a marketing technique by restaurant owners. Similarly, Australian public health educators have considered attaching their own health programs to No Diet Day and other similar movements, in order to take advantage of their popularity.

== See also ==
- International Size Acceptance Association
- National Organization for Women
- Health at Every Size
