= Abby Langer =

Canadian dietitian and writer

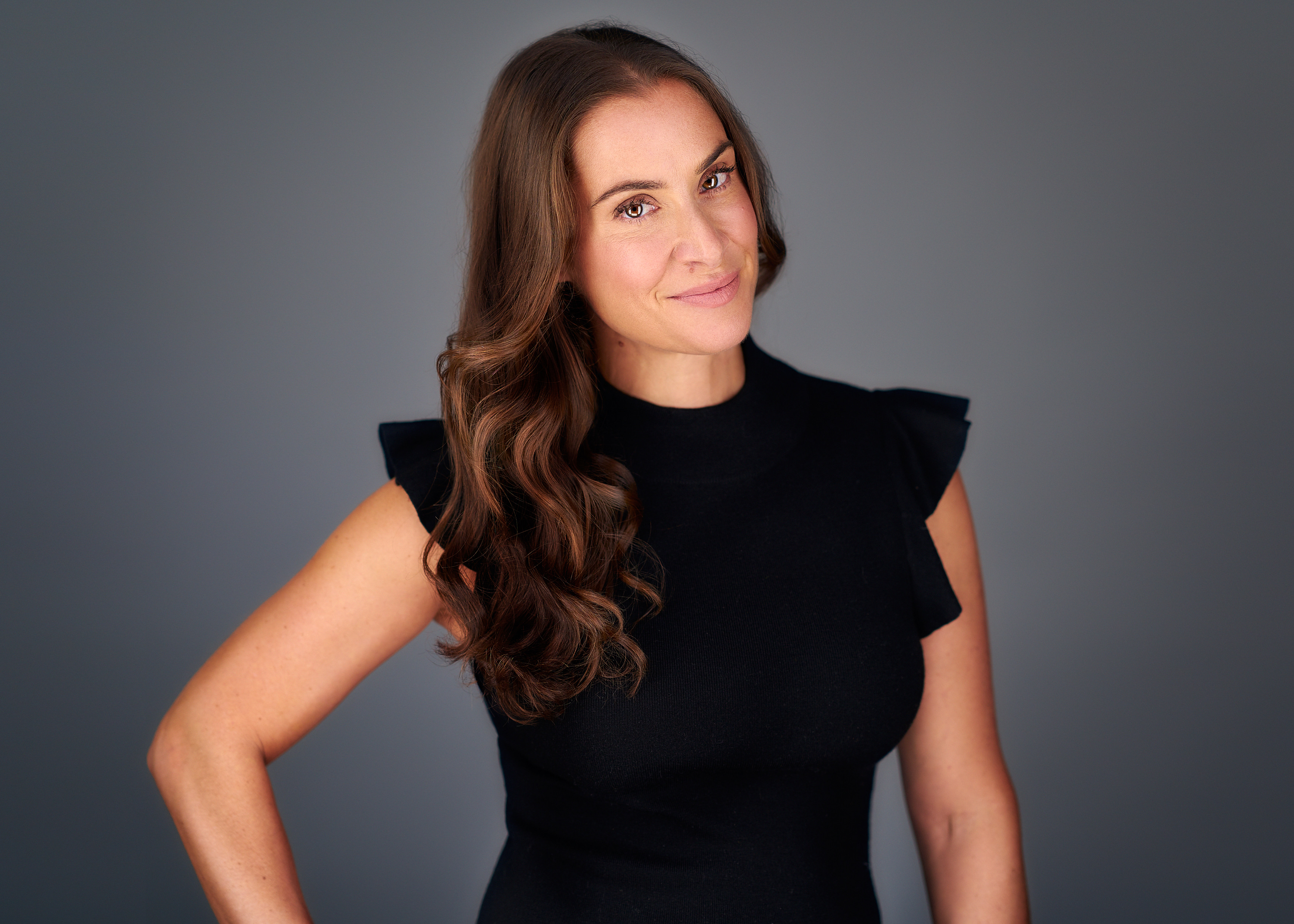
- Occupation: Dietitian

Abby Langer is a Canadian registered dietitian and food writer known for her support for evidence-based medicine and criticism of fad diets.

== Biography ==
Langer was educated at Dalhousie University and Loyola University Chicago. She has been a registered dietitian since 1999. She works in Toronto and operates the website Abby Langer Nutrition.

In 2021, Langer authored the book Good Food, Bad Diet, which addresses the psychology of dieting and changing debate about what qualifies as "good food". Langer draws on her more than 21 years experience as a registered dietitian to debunk fad diets and nutritional misinformation that is promoted by celebrities and on social media. The book explores the negative effects of diet culture and offers science-based advice on how to enjoy food and lose weight without guilt or shame.

== Selected publications ==
- Good Food, Bad Diet: The Habits You Need to Ditch Diet Culture, Lose Weight, and Fix Your Relationship With Food Forever (Simon & Schuster, 2021)
