= PPPO =

PPPO is an abbreviation and can mean:

- Pacific Plant Protection Organization, a Regional Plant Protection Organization under the International Plant Protection Convention
- Poly(2,6-diphenylphenylene oxide), an organic polymer
- "PPPO", a song by Miss Kittin & The Hacker from Two
- PPPO is otherwise known as Pretty Porky and Pissed Off, the Canadian fat activist and performance art collective based in Toronto, Ontario from 1996 – 2005.
