= Judy Freespirit =

American feminist and activist (1936–2010)

Judy Freespirit (1936–2010) was a 20th century American feminist and activist, known for her role in the Fat Liberation Movement and the LGBTQ and Disability Rights Movements. She was one of the founders of the Fat Underground, a fat feminist group, a proponent of the Radical Therapy Movement and wrote about the fight for social change for fat women and LGBTQ women. As a part of the Fat Underground, she wrote the "Fat Liberation Manifesto," demanding rights and social change for fat women.

== Biography ==
Judy Freespirit was born in Detroit, Michigan in 1936 to a working class family. In her childhood she dealt with incestuous abuse from her father and her mother constantly fat-shamed her, restricting her diet. She grew up with dance and theater as sources of enjoyment, married at an early age, and began working in a psychiatric hospital. As she became increasingly involved in the Women’s Liberation Movement in the late 1970's, she came out as a lesbian and left her husband and children.

Freespirit became an activist and writer for several issues she faced in her daily life. She focused on lesbian rights, fat acceptance, disability rights, and incest survival. One of her most well-known works was the Fat Liberation Manifesto, in which she displayed her activism for LGBTQ+ and fat acceptance. She died due to various health complications in 2010 in San Francisco.

== The Fat Underground ==
The Radical Therapy movement and the Fat Pride movement of the 1970s influenced the rise of the Fat Underground movement. The movement was against the stigmatization of mental illness. They believed that psychiatry should focus on changing society. The Fat Pride movement was against social inequality because of weight. Judy Freespirit and Sara Golda Bracha Fishman founded the organization as a National Association to Advance Fat Acceptance (NAAFA) chapter in Los Angeles. They believed that weight loss through medical treatment was oppression and that public health specialists were omitting research findings, letting weight-loss industry continue to exploit people.

The Fat Underground supported the notion that a majority of fat individuals could not “cure” themselves through dieting because being fat was biological. They brought evidence from medical libraries and primary sources to fight against anti-fat biases. This stance received conflicting responses from the main NAAFA, moving Freespirit and her supporters to quit the NAAFA. They launched the Fat Underground as a separate organization with five members.

The Fat Underground became the most well-known organization outside the NAAFA. Freespirit gave lectures, protested dieting clinics, and spread the organization’s views through the “Fat Liberation Manifesto.” The Fat Underground disbanded in 1983 as many members left Los Angeles and after the last member, Reanna Fagan, passed away.

== Books ==
Judy Freespirit co-wrote the Fat Liberation Manifesto with a Fat Underground member known as Aldebaran. The manifesto stated that "fat people are fully deserving of human respect, demanded equal rights for fat people, and viewed the struggle to end fat oppression as 'allied with the struggles of other oppressed groups.'" The manifesto publicized the oppression of fat women and encouraged people to change their opinions about fatness.

In addition to the Fat Liberation Manifesto, Freespirit wrote four books: Keeping it in the Family, Whole Lotta Quakin' Goin' On, A Slim Volume of Fat Poems, and Daddy's Girl. As a childhood sexual abuse survivor, she wrote Daddy's Girl: An Incest Survivor Story to change the understanding that childhood sexual abuse can cause lesbianism. The book also told of how lesbian sex played a part in her healing by combining the protagonist's memories of her relationship with her father with the experiences of her female lover. In focusing on her current relationship, she could take "a degree of control and power over her sexuality that her father deprived her of as a child."

Freespirit's public readings of Daddy's Girl provided opportunities for survivors to come together, share their stories, and find solidarity. These events were held in women's bookstores, creating an atmosphere that prioritized the voices and experiences of women and girls. She received requests from female therapists to use the book for patients, even for male survivors. She established, however, that all of her work was "for women only."

Thematically similar Keeping it in the Family is about a "fat, disabled, middle-aged, Jewish lesbian" who is dealing with her childhood sexual abuse. In this book the protagonist realizes that her story connects with her ancestors and she writes about the effects of incest through generations.

Her writings made an impact on survivors dealing with the connection between their childhood abuse and accepting their current sexuality. Another work, A Slim Volume of Fat Poems, was a chapbook in which different authors published poems about fat empowerment. A Whole Lotta Quakin' Goin' On was a memoir about the 1969 earthquake in San Francisco.

== Legacy ==
Freespirit co-organized the first Feminist Fat Activist Working Meeting in April 1980, along with Judith Stein and Diane Denne. This event was an important transition in the movement, providing a platform for fat women to come together, share their experiences, and advocate for their rights.

She sought to challenge societal norms and the oppressive narratives surrounding fatness in her work. One of Freespirit's legacies is her contribution in the publication Shadow on a Tightrope: Writings by Women on Fat Oppression. Alongside Lisa Schoenfielder and Barb Wieser, Freespirit helped compile this anthology, which featured both published and unpublished pieces from the Fat Liberator Press. This collection focused on body positivity and acceptance.

Her legacy has resonated internationally as her efforts inspired fat activists in Great Britain to create the London Fat Women's Group and subsequent events. The group faced challenges and eventually dissolved, but was a step towards creating a supportive community for fat women in the UK.

Freespirit also highlighted the intersectionality of fat activism and feminism. Her work helped to define broader perspectives on how society engages with the stories of survivors and the LGBTQ community.
