= Lindo Bacon =

American nutritionist

Lindo Bacon, born and published as Linda Bacon, is a nutritionist, researcher and author. They have a doctorate in physiology and master's degrees in exercise science and psychotherapy.

Much of Bacon's earliest work is in the Health at Every Size field, including Health at Every Size and Body Respect. Bacon's latest book, Radical Belonging: How to Survive and Thrive in an Unjust World (While Transforming It for the Better) was published in November 2020.. As of 2022, they were an associate nutritionist at UC Davis.

Lindo is genderqueer and goes by they/them pronouns.
