= Group (film) =

2002 American film

- Directed by: Marilyn Freeman; Anne de Marcken
- Story by: Marilyn Freeman; Anne de Marcken; the cast
- Produced by: Marilyn Freeman; Anne de Marcken; Margery B. Brown
- Edited by: Tim Jenson
- Distributed by: Artistic License Films
- Release date: 2002
- Running time: 106 minutes
- Country: United States
- Language: English

Group is a 2002 comedy drama film produced by Marilyn Freeman and Anne de Marcken, and co-produced by Margery B. Brown. It was directed by Freeman and de Marcken, with story by the directors in collaboration with the cast. It stars Carrie Brownstein, Nomy Lamm, and others as members of a weekly group therapy session.

== Synopsis ==
Eight women answer an ad for a course of “sliding-scale, queer-friendly” group therapy in Olympia, Washington over 21 weeks. These include leg-amputee and childhood sexual abuse survivor Pipi (Nomy Lamm), middle-aged conservative Violet (Vicki Hollenberg), Christian Clansey (Tony Wilkerson), sarcastic rocker Rita (Lola Rock N’ Rolla) and hypochondriac Grace (Carrie Brownstein of the Olympia riot grrrl band Sleater-Kinney). The group is led by Ruby Martin, an actual therapist.

== Cast ==
The film features:

- Kari Fillipi as Claire
- Tony Wilkerson as Clansey
- Carrie Brownstein as Grace
- Nomy Lamm as Pipi
- Tracy Kirkpatrick as Rachel
- Lola Rock N' Rolla as Rita
- Ruby Martin as Herself
- S. Ann Hall as Tody
- Vicki Hollenberg as Violet

== Production ==
Group was written by filmmakers Marilyn Freeman and Anne de Marcken in collaboration with the cast. It was directed by Freeman and de Marcken, and one of the cameras was operated by de Marcken. It was co-produced by Margery B. Brown and edited by Tim Jenson. Music supervision was by Pat Maley and Freeman, and sound was recorded by Jenson. Production design was by de Marcken. Annie Callaghan was assistant director. Lynn Damiano is credited as psychological consultant. It has a running time of 1 hour and 46 minutes.

Freeman had attended Cornish College of the Arts in Seattle, studying theater before moving to New York, where she became involved in television production. After more than 10 years, she returned to the West Coast. de Marcken studied film at Evergreen State College, after which she stayed in Olympia. The pair founded the digital media arts studio Wovie, pronounced like "movie" with a "w". Group was the first of three pictures they planned to produce.

Inspired by their experiences in group therapy, Freeman and de Marcken gathered eight actresses and worked with them in developing the characters, so that while filming the cast could improvise their roles in sessions conducted by an actual therapist. Though they had originally written a script, the first few weeks of shooting from it were so fruitless that they abandoned it and switched to improvisation.

The film was shot on digital video. While in the sessions the screen is divided into six images, catching not just each current speaker, but also the reactions of fellow group members. These are punctuated by occasional full-screen, dialogue-free segments that depict each attendee in a public location. The cameras are often visible in shot, though their presence is never addressed. It is never explained why the attendees would allow a camera to eavesdrop.

The subheadings for each of the sequences, such as Virginity, Not My Issue and Dolphins, are shown posted on a sheet of paper in a storefront window.

The soundtrack consists of songs by Sleater-Kinney, the Need, Gossip, the Aislers Set and other alt-rock acts.

== Release ==
It screened at the San Francisco Lesbian and Gay Film Festival on June 13, 2002. It was distributed by Artistic License Films.

== Reception ==
The Village Voice said that the film "articulates a flood of emotion", and that the improvisation makes the characters "feel inhabited rather than acted". Variety called it an "intriguing if limited-appeal experiment", and said while "it’s disappointing that Freeman fails to shape their testimonies into a dramatically satisfying arc […] there’s no denying the realistic edge her actors provide."

Review aggregator Rotten Tomatoes reported an approval rating of 57%, based on 14 reviews. Metacritic (which uses a weighted average) gave the film a score of 53 out of 100 based on 10 critics, indicating "mixed or average" reviews.
