= Heather Corinna =

American author and activist

- Born: April 18, 1970 (age 55); Chicago, Illinois, U.S.
- Education: Chicago Academy for the Arts; Shimer College
- Occupations: Feminist activist, writer, photographer, artist, educator

Heather Corinna (born April 18, 1970) is an author, activist, and Internet publisher with a focus on progressive, affirming sexuality. Corinna is a self-described "queer, rabblerousing, polymath". Corinna is non-binary, uses they/them pronouns, and has advocated for accepting the diverse forms of a sexual experience and avoiding "expertitis".

== Biography ==
Corinna was born in Chicago, Illinois, and grew up in Chicago and Lancaster County, Pennsylvania. Corinna suffered sexual assault at age 12, and was homeless by age 16. Corinna has written about the role that sexual assault and other violence experienced as a youth have played in motivating their later art and activism.

Corinna is a 1986 graduate of the Chicago Academy for the Arts, studying music, creative writing, and art. They also attended Shimer College, then located in Waukegan, majoring in Humanities.

Later, Corinna worked for several years as an early childhood educator. After working in education with developmentally disabled adults and in a Montessori elementary classroom, they founded an alternative kindergarten/pre-kindergarten in Chicago, running it from 1992 to 1996. and continuing to work as a kindergarten teacher until quitting to work on Scarleteen full-time.

In 2015, Corinna received the Sexual Health Champion award from Vancouver-based Options for Sexual Health.

Corinna established a Facebook group for people in perimenopause and menopause in 2019.

=== Scarlet Letters and Scarleteen ===
In the late 1990s, Corinna founded Scarlet Letters, an adult erotica online magazine targeted at women. Shortly after being created, the site was removed by web hosting provider Verio, forcing a need to find alternate hosting.

Since the main content of the site was meant to be off-limits to teenagers, Corinna posted five pages of basic sexual education content for teenagers to read. Upon being deluged with requests for further information, they established Scarleteen in 1998. The side of the website targeted at girls was originally known as "Pink Slip". In 1999, a section targeted at boys, initially known as "The Boyfriend", was added.

Both Scarlet Letters and Scarleteen faced difficulty obtaining traffic and financial support in their early years. In the 1990s, Scarleteen was often excluded by mainstream directories as too sexual, while pornographic sites also refused to provide a link to it for their under-18 visitors. The site subsequently came to survive largely on donations, some of which came from past users with children of their own.

== Work ==
=== Art ===
- Founded in 1998 by Corinna and co-editor Hanne Blank, Scarlet Letters was one of the earliest adult erotica online magazines and was the first woman-owned, woman-run, and women-centered sexuality website. It initially featured erotic fiction, poetry, photography, and visual art and expanded to include non-erotic content that promotes progressive sexuality. The website is currently on hiatus.
- Corinna's personal website, Femmerotic, contains samples of photography, writing, and journal entries.
- Corinna's work has also appeared in The Guardian Issues Magazine, PIF Magazine, Maxi Magazine, CleanSheets, LeisureSuit.Net, Other Rooms, Cherrybomb, Sexilicious, Blood Moon, BAACHOR Magazine (in which their essay "The Door Into One Moment, Eternal" was nominated for a Pushcart Prize) and Batteries Not Included. Their fiction and creative nonfiction have also appeared in the anthologies Yes Means Yes: Visions of Female Sexual Power and A World Without Rape, Viscera, The Adventures of Food, Aqua Erotica, Zaftig: Well-Rounded Erotica, The Mammoth Book of Best New Erotica 1 & 2, Shameless: An Intimate Erotica, and Penthouse and will appear in the forthcoming anthologies Breakthrough Bleeding: Essays on the Thing Women Spend a Quarter of Their Time Doing, but No One’s Supposed To Talk About and What We Think: Gender Roles, Women's Issues and Feminism in the 21st Century.
- Corinna's photography and visual art have been shown at/in 555 Gallery, Sex Worker Visions (New York), Babes in Toyland, Jane's Guide, Michelle 7, On Our Backs, the Bryant-Lake Bowl, Trixx (to benefit the LGBT+ youth center, District 202), The Independent, The Mammoth Book of Erotic Women, SEAF 2004, and other venues.

=== Sexual education ===
- Corinna founded Scarleteen, an "independent, grassroots sexuality education and support organization and website," in 1998. The website is staffed by Corinna and a group of volunteers. As of 2007, the website received 10,000-30,000 visitors per day.
- Corinna's book, S.E.X.: The All-You-Need-To-Know Progressive Sexuality Guide To Get You Through High School and College, was published by Da Capo Press in 2007. The book has been reviewed by Curve, Minnesota Women's Press, and others.
- Corinna's book, What Fresh Hell Is This?: Perimenopause, Menopause, Other Indignities, and You, was published by Balance, June 1, 2021.
