= Nomy Lamm =

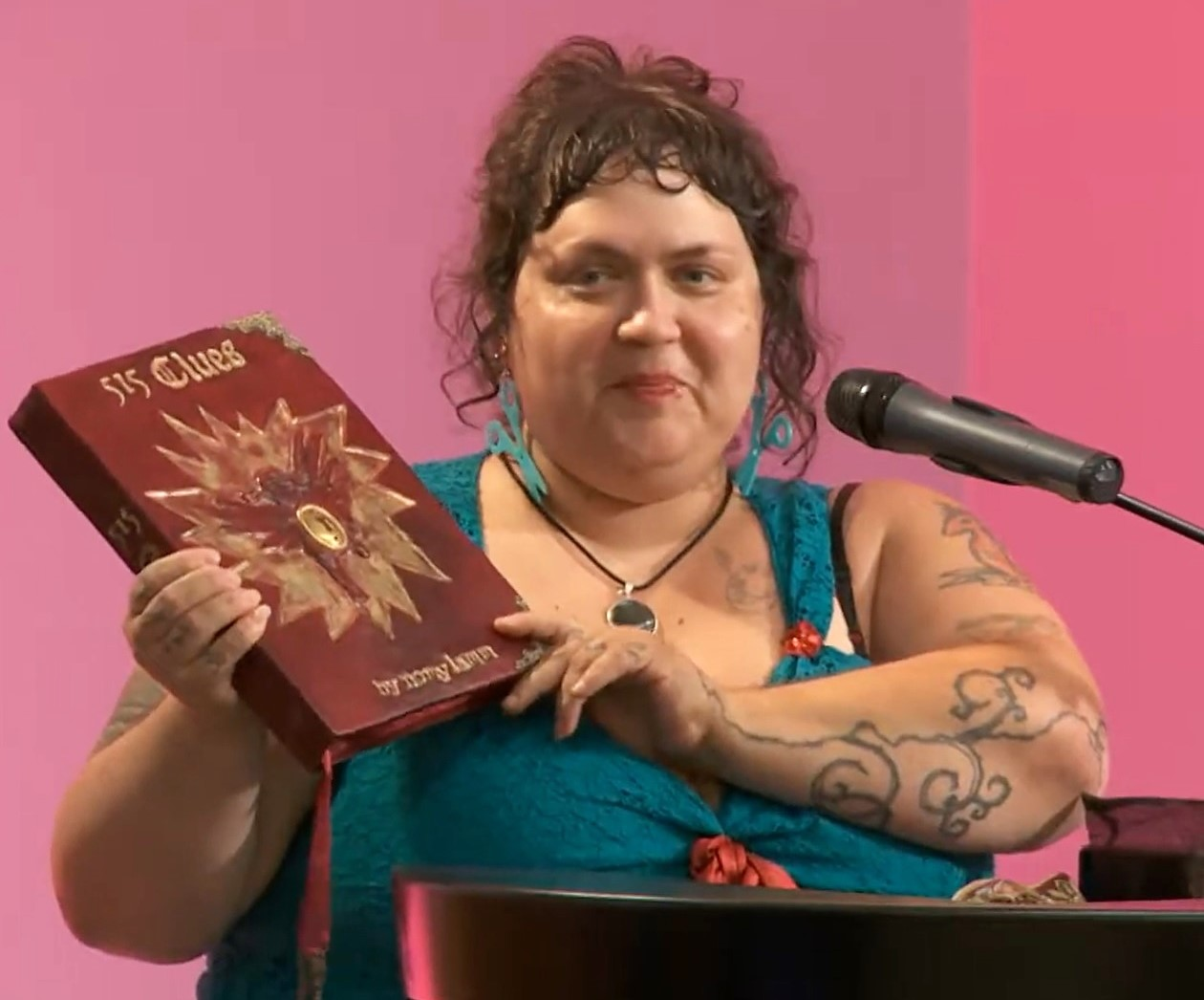
- Lamm reads from her experimental novel 515 Clues at the San Francisco Public Library in 2015.

Background information
- Born: Naomi Elizabeth Lamm; September 1, 1975 (age 51)
- Genres: Riot grrrl, punk rock
- Occupation: Musician
- Instruments: Vocals, accordion, theremin
- Years active: 1991–present

Naomi Elizabeth "Nomy" Lamm (born September 1, 1975) is an American singer-songwriter and political activist. Lamm has described herself as a "bad ass, fat ass, Jew, dyke amputee." Her left foot was amputated at age three, to be fitted with a leg prosthesis, to treat a bone growth disorder. This trauma influenced Lamm's later work concerning body image. She is also known for her activism on the issue of fat acceptance.

== Biography ==
=== 1990s ===
Lamm was involved with musical theater during her youth. She became part of the queercore scene in Olympia, Washington, where she performed with various musicians. In 1991 she published the first of three issues of a zine titled I'm So Fucking Beautiful. The zine's visual narrative of vulnerability deliberately counters its textual power where she expresses her anger at her treatment as a young fat woman.

In 1999, Lamm released a solo debut album of punk rock music with revolutionary themes, titled Anthem. Originally, the record company Talent Show sought to compile the work of the various bands with whom she performed as frontwoman, but Lamm chose to re-record the music as a solo project. Later in 1999, Lamm released The Transfused, a soundtrack to the anti-corporate rock musical that she created with The Need. Lamm also toured as part of Doctor Frockrocket's Vivifying Reanimatronic Menagerie and Medicine Show. Effigy, released by Yoyo Recordings, represented a departure for Lamm, with electronica replacing the sparse production of her previous work. "What I'm doing now is total disco-pop," she said at the time, "but it's still punk because it was created through punk channels using punk ethics." Thematically, Effigy continued Lamm's call for a revolution, but this album's focus was on an internal, rather than external revolution.

=== 2000s ===
Lamm continued to publish zines, and she also gave theatrical college lectures on fat oppression, sometimes dressed in fairy wings and waving a magic wand. For this, Lamm was nominated for Ms. magazine's "Woman Of The Year" award. Lamm also toured as part of the spoken word performance troupe, Sister Spit, and wrote as a regular columnist for Punk Planet magazine.

She played the character of Pipi in the 2002 film Group.

From January 2004 until May 2005, Lamm co-hosted a monthly genderqueer open mike variety show called The Finger with Ana Jae. The show was held at a feminist sex toy store in Chicago, called Early to Bed, and it featured live poetry, improv, comedy, dance, storytelling, video exhibition, folk music, rock music, and performance art. The Finger was said to inspire local queer people to take artistic risks and express themselves freely.

Lamm's music is featured in the 2006 documentary, Young, Jewish, and Left. An interview with her about the connections between punk rock and Judaism appear in the DVD extras. Lamm's most recent group musical venture is with the band Tricrotic with Marcus Rogers and Erin Daly. They have recorded one EP.

=== 2010s ===
Her current music project is entitled nomy lamm & THE WHOLE WIDE WORLD. It is a platform for collaborations and workshops with other artists of any genre, such as Dylan Shearer, Mirah, Annah Anti-Palindrome, EPRhyme, and Felonious.

Lamm writes for make/shift magazine in the section called Dear Nomy.

Lamm directed the Artists in Residence Program for Sins Invalid, a non-profit arts organization in the Bay area that features performances about sexuality and disability and centralizes the work of people of color and queer people.

In 2012, Lamm was a keynote speaker at the biannual Femme Conference. She completed writing her first book, for her MFA, a series of short stories about trauma and transformation called 515 Clues.

As of 2017, Lamm was writing a novel titled The Best Part Comes After the End.

Lamm held an artist talk and creative process workshop for students and the Olympia community on June 6, 2019, at the Kenneth J. Minnaert Center for the Arts Black Box Theater.

=== 2020s ===
Lamm continues writing and performing with Sins Invalid and nomy lamm & THE WHOLE WIDE WORLD.

Lamm participated in a music video for the social-distancing-friendly music series Promising Notes — put together by the Olympia Downtown Alliance, Octapas Cafe and the City of Olympia's Artists on Board project.

Lamm continues writing and releasing music with her band, The Beauty. Their most recent release, "Honey", was written and recorded for the Sins Invalid production "We Love Like Barnacles: Crip Lives in Climate Chaos," which had streamed Oct 23, 24, 25, 2020.

Following a film screening of Sins Invalid's "Unshamed Claim to Beauty", Lamm participated in the Sins Invalid #NoBodyIsDisposable Film Panel (with ASL & embedded captions).

== Personal life ==
Lamm, who self-identifies as a Jewish witch and is involved with Jewitch Camp, an organization of likeminded witches and neopagans within the Reclaiming tradition of Wicca. She has been ordained as a Kohenet Priestess by the Kohenet Hebrew Priestess Institute and has created a divination deck for the Counting of the Omer between Passover and Shavuot. Lamm practices ceremonial magic, reads tarot, and studies Kabbalah.

Lamm lives on what she has identified as Squaxin, Nisqually, and Chehalis land in Olympia, Washington with her partner Lisa, along with cats and dogs.

== Discography ==
=== Albums ===
- Anthem, Talent Show Records, 1999
- The Transfused (with The Need), Yoyo Recordings, 2000
- Effigy, Yoyo Recordings, 2003
- Nobody Knows What We've Been Through, self-release 2008

== Bibliography (illustrator) ==
- I'm Jay, Let's Play by Beth Reichmuth and Nomy Lamm

== See also ==
- Fat acceptance movement
- Fat feminism
- Gender fluidity
