= Fattitude =

- Directed by: Viridiana Lieberman; Lindsey Averill
- Produced by: Lindsey Averill
- Release date: November 2, 2017
- Country: United States
- Language: English

Fattitude is a 2017 American documentary film by Lindsey Averill and Viridiana Lieberman.

== Summary ==
The movie is about fat discrimination and its main objective is to make the general public more aware of the prejudice that fat people experienced. The movie promotes the fat acceptance movement—a social movement that seeks to change anti-fat bias in social attitudes.

The documentary informs people about what the filmmakers call fat shaming and fat hatred. The documentary also hopes to inspire people to speak out about the prejudice they face or the mistreatment of others.

== Production ==
The film was financed by running a successful crowdfunding campaign at the website Kickstarter in which 1,073 backers pledged $44,140 to help bring this project to life.

== Controversy ==
After start the Kickstarter campaign, Averill and Lieberman became the target of heavy trolling and harassment from anonymous users on 4chan and other web forums, and received rape and death threats. People ordered pizzas delivered to Averill's home, and they were forced to change their phone numbers due to the number of hateful calls.
