= Diet culture =

Set of trends and norms dominant with those monitoring food consumption

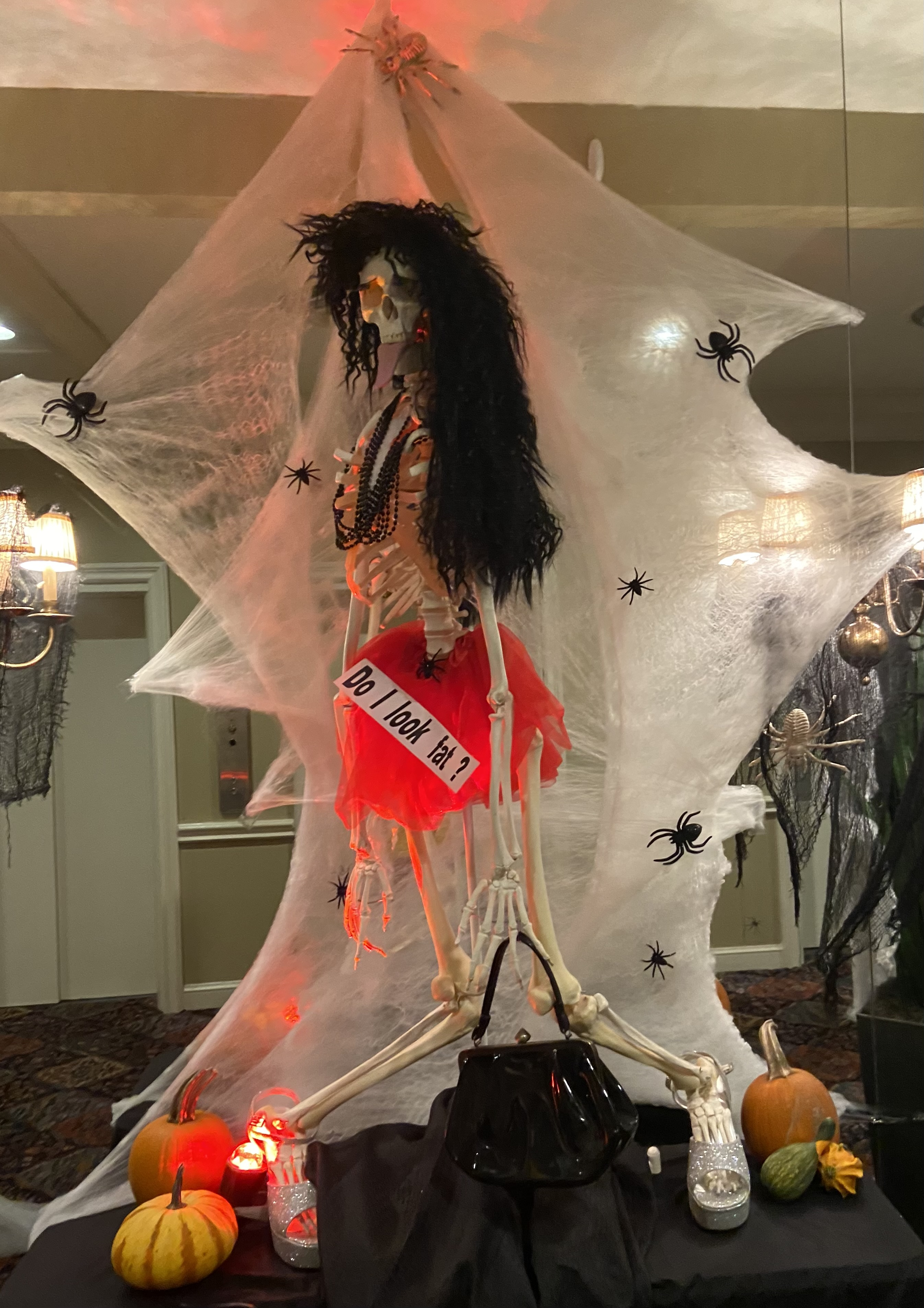
Diet culture joke featuring Halloween skeleton

Diet culture refers to a common set of trends and norms that may specifically affect those undertaking dieting or monitoring their caloric or nutritional intake. It often describes a set of societal beliefs pertaining to food and body image, primarily focused on losing weight, an endorsement of thinness as a high moral standard, and the alteration of food consumption. Scholars and activists believe that diet culture is often intertwined with racism and other forms of prejudice, and rely on an intersectional approach to discuss the interactions of prejudice based on gender, race, and weight. As a term, "diet culture" is used as a framework for social analysis and as a critique of contemporary social standards and their impact on body images and health as it pertains to those classified as overweight and engaged in a diet regimen.

== History ==
While dieting for health reasons can be traced to ancient Greece, and a type of spiritually-focused eating disorder called holy anorexia was known in the Middle Ages, the movement of dieting motivated specifically by weight loss emerged in the middle of the 19th century. William Banting's A Letter on Corpulence was a self-published work documenting his weight loss directed towards white middle-class men and is considered the earliest significant work on the topic. In the late 19th and early 20th centuries, a move from plumpness to thinness as a sign of attractiveness in women led to women's magazines including dieting advice; other social changes include the popularisation of calorie counting as a dieting method, which was originally used for rationing in wartime.

The second half of the 20th century marked the emergence of the fat acceptance movement, followed in the early 21st century by the body positivity movement. At the same time, there was widespread pressure applied to women to lose weight and remain thin, including through fad diets and public social pressure. "Diet culture" as a term likely emerged in the early 2010s and has since been used to analyze past and current cultural and social sentiments. The emergence of weight loss drugs such as Ozempic at the beginning of the 2020s and the associated cultural and social changes have led to arguments that a regression of diet culture has taken place.

== Use ==
Diet culture is often used as a framework for social analysis and critique. Among the topics primarily discussed is the use of critical terms for foods and their consumption, but also of the impact of diet culture on the social and medical treatment of overweight people. The term is used by activists who believe that it causes harm, which can be considered a shared belief among anti-diet movements. Intuitive eating is considered by some to be a remedy against the negative effects of diet culture.

The use of diet culture as an analytical framework is often associated with intersectionality and anti-racism based on the outsized impact of diet culture on people of color. Sabrina Strings, sociologist at the University of California, Santa Barbara, argues that diet culture is used to enforce existing social hierarchies in a way that disadvantages marginalized groups. Beginning in the late 19th century, scientific racism was used as a tool for criticizing the eating habits and weight of Black people, leading black women in particular to diet due to social pressure. Black women were often accused by the medical community of having an "inability to control their 'animal appetites'", despite the lack of any scientific evidence. Diet culture has also been criticized for its outsized impact on the body image and mental health of the Latino community, and for denigrating its traditional foods and social structures in favor of western diets and culture.

== Language ==
The diet culture has its own jargon, including words such as:

- Diet – a pattern of food consumption meant to produce weight loss and thinness unless specifically specified otherwise (e.g., a bulking-up diet for bodybuilders).
- Superfood – a marketing term with no legal meaning, usually applied to fresh produce, such as kale, avocados, or pomegranates.
- Toxic food or poison – a food judged unhealthful by the speaker; for example, coconut oil has been called "pure poison" because it is high in saturated fat. Which food is the toxic one varies by time and place. For example, MSG was called toxic in the 1970s, and gluten was called toxic in the 2000s.
- Junk food – high-calorie food with limited nutritional benefit, such as sweetened soft drinks and potato chips.
- Processed food or ultra-processed food – food that has been produced in a factory. This often invokes class-based discrimination, so that an inexpensive, lower-calorie food choice from a fast-food restaurant is deemed inferior to a similar, but higher-calorie and more expensive food from a boutique shop.
- Cheat day – occasionally eating normally for a day, as if restrictive eating patterns were normal.
- Sinful, temptation, or naughty – a moralizing judgment on pleasurable food, which the speaker may try to make atonement for or do penance for in the form of unpleasurable or excessive exercise or restrictions.
- Cleanse diet – a type of temporary liquid diet; a modern term for a crash diet.
- Clean eating – a dietary pattern that judges some foods as clean and others as dirty, and promises that eating only clean foods will improve the eater's quality of life; associated with orthorexia.
- Wellness – a broad concept encompassing almost any sort of mental or physical health goal that is done without the use of pharmaceutical drugs.
- Holiday weight gain – the bogeyman of eating during the Christmas and holiday season, used in marketing programs to normalize bingeing and encourage restriction. (Most American adults gain less than one pound (0.35 kg) during this time.)

== Reception ==
Diet culture is generally a term used to discuss contemporary approaches to dieting and body images in a critical way. There are concerns that it could promote body image issues, eating disorders, and other mental health issues. Due to these concerns and the negative appeal surrounding the term, diet culture has been reframed as a focus on fitness and health. This perspective centered around prioritizing individual well-being and health rather than emphasizing the improvement of one's physique by losing weight. Commonly, there is a significant difference between what is recommended by healthcare professionals and what social media influencers advocate for.

At the same time, those advocating against diet culture have faced accusations of spreading inaccurate information by denying or minimizing the health impact of excessive weight and unhealthy diets. Registered dietitian and research scientist Kevin Klatt described the claims by some junk food companies and paid influencers about the link between high body fat and chronic illness as "a fantasy and a total fairy tale", because having excess fat tissue is scientifically proven to cause some diseases.

== See also ==
- Body mass index
- Fat feminism
