= Effigy (album) =

Studio album by Nomy Lamm
- Released: February 2, 2003
- Genre: Queercore; Experimental; Spoken word Punk
- Length: 67:30
- Label: Yoyo Recordings
- Producer: Pat Maley

Nomy Lamm chronology
Anthem (2003)	Effigy (2003)

Effigy is a 2003 album by Nomy Lamm. It combines accordion, layered vocals, sound effects, and electro-driven drum beats. Lamm's official website states the creative purpose of the album was "to create a heartfelt goodbye to her hometown and its control over her." The album was produced as a full-length theatrical rock show in the summer of 2003. Lamm went on the road with and performed songs from the album.
