= International Size Acceptance Association =

U.S. non-governmental organization

The International Size Acceptance Association (ISAA) is a United States based non-governmental organization (NGO) aimed at advancing fat acceptance, directed by Allen Steadham. Unlike the National Association to Advance Fat Acceptance (NAAFA), the organisation has an international slant and has several overseas branches, though many of its operations remain within the U.S. at present.

== The organisation today ==
=== Current leading figures ===
The current people are prominent in the association at present:

- Allen Steadham - Director and Founder
- Daphne Bradshaw - Secretary
- Grace Moredock - Advisor and Editor of ISAA Publication Without Measure
- Kelly Bliss - Advisor
- Doris Skiba - Coordinator ISAA Diversity Initiative
- Michael Drenth - Legislative Coordinator
- Lynda Finn - Advisor

=== Branches ===
The ISAA has branches in the following locations.

Branches within the United States:

- Atlanta
- Chicago
- Texas ("Virtual" branch)
- New York City ("Virtual" branch)

Branches outside the United States:

- United Kingdom
- Middle East/North Africa
- Philippines ("Virtual" branch - though it does have a real representative, Karen Ang)
- Australia ("Virtual" branch - Australian representative Jodie Hunter)
- New Zealand (NZ representative, Lynda Finn)

Also, ISAA has an alliance with Allegro Fortissimo of France.

ISAA strongly encourages members and prospective members to set up branches in their own area.

=== Policies and mission ===
ISAA is dedicated to size acceptance and bringing an end to what it feels is unfair discrimination against large people. Its mission is "to promote Size Acceptance and fight size discrimination throughout the world by means of advocacy and visible, lawful actions".

ISAA has adopted a position of opposition to weight loss surgery (WLS) as dangerous and unnecessary, and conducted a campaign against it in 2001. This is shared in common with most other size/fat acceptance organisations, though campaigns have met with relatively limited success.

ISAA also opposed the definition by the U.S. government of obesity as a disease, though it was ultimately unsuccessful in preventing this. Other policies and positions include:

- Opposition to feederism and similar weight gain fetishes
- Encouraging fitness and low-impact exercise (swimming, walking, etc.)
- Encouraging self-respect and self-esteem
- Encouraging healthy body image

=== Publications ===
Much of the organisation is centered on online campaigns and information, and media interviews. The main publication that the association runs is the online magazine "Without Measure" and associated group blog "WOM Beta".

This is maintained and edited by Grace Moredock, ISAA's Secretary. A new addition is usually published around twice a year, though it is not regular. Early on, the publication was offered for download via PDF format, though since 2001, it has been published online.

The publication has a youth section and content called "BBTeenz". ISAA does reach out to youth and young adults more than any of the other main size acceptance groups. ISAA also keeps an archive of printable flyers and leaflets on its website for members to print and distribute, and encourages people to link to its site. Some local chapters also keep their own website, either independent or as a subsection of the main ISAA site.

=== Podcasts ===
ISAA has had a variety of podcast productions since 2002.

"Today Size Acceptance Has A Voice!" Now archived, the ISAA Rapport was broadcast via streaming Windows Media, Gia Marciano and Allen Steadham broadcast over the internet from Austin, Texas, in a contemporary "talk radio" format. Gia and Allen blended humor and insight with the hard-hitting topics of interest to the Size Acceptance Community and also inform the general public about size-related issues (for some people, for the first time).

In addition to Gia and Allen's take on today's size-related issues, "The ISAA Rapport" featured live interviews with well-known guests on a variety of subjects, from self-esteem to fashion to politics.

Currently, ISAA's main podcast is called PODWOM. PODWOM is the abbreviation for Podcast Without Measure, the podcast edition of Without Measure (WOM), the official electronic magazine for the International Size Acceptance Association (ISAA). Each podcast features unique segments, commentary plus in-depth discussions and interviews conducted by the show's host, ISAA Founder and Director, Allen Steadham.

Like WOM, each segment reflects a different element of interest concerning size acceptance, Respect Fitness Health, science, fashion, current events and much more. PODWOM's aim is to present each segment in an entertaining and informative way, made available in downloadable MP3 format.

PODWOM's theme song is taken with permission from the song "In Him", performed by the now disbanded Des Moines-based Christian artists, Coram Deo.

=== Membership ===
ISAA is no longer a membership organization, effective September 1, 2006. Prior to that, membership cost $20. ISAA has had as many as 2,500 members worldwide, but membership was never ISAA's main focus so much as public participation in size activism and education.

== History ==
ISAA was founded on July 1, 1997, by Allen Steadham, the current director, in Austin, Texas. The first issue of Without Measure came out in August, and set out the ISAA's mission and position regarding WLS and media and medical world's treatment of fat people. From its early days, it has been a predominantly web based organisation, and has always relied heavily on the internet to expand, organise and campaign.

ISAA has been mentioned by Yomiuri, CNN, Los Angeles Times, TIME Magazine, Fox News, and the New York Times. In June 1997, Steadham wrote to then American President Bill Clinton, receiving a personal letter in response (now scanned onto the ISAA website) and an in‑depth radio interview by the British Broadcasting Corporation (BBC) of the UK in February 2006 with ISAA UK head, Fatima Parker.

== See also ==
- Fat acceptance movement
- International No Diet Day
- National Association to Advance Fat Acceptance (NAAFA)
