= Health at Every Size =

Movement to de-emphasize weight loss as a health goal

Health at Every Size (HAES) is a public health framework owned by the Association for Size Diversity and Health. It emphasizes all bodies have the right to seek out health, regardless of size, without bias, and reduce stigma towards people living with obesity. Proponents argue that traditional interventions focused on weight loss, such as dieting, do not reliably produce positive health outcomes, and that health is a result of lifestyle behaviors that can be performed independently of body weight. However, many criticize the approach and argue that weight loss should sometimes be an explicit goal of healthcare interventions, because of the negative health outcomes associated with obesity.

== History ==
Health at Every Size first appeared in the 1960s, advocating that the changing culture toward physical attractiveness and beauty standards had negative health and psychological repercussions to fat people. They believed that because the slim and fit body type had become the acceptable standard of attractiveness, fat people were going to great pains to lose weight, and that this was not, in fact, always healthy for the individual. They contend that some people are naturally a larger body type, and that in some cases losing a large amount of weight could in fact be extremely unhealthy for some. On November 4, 1967, Lew Louderback wrote an article called "More People Should Be Fat!" that appeared in a popular-level US magazine, The Saturday Evening Post. In the opinion piece, Louderback argued that:

1. "Thin fat people" suffer physically and emotionally from having dieted to below their natural body weight.
2. Forced changes in weight are not only likely to be temporary, but also to cause physical and emotional damage.
3. Dieting seems to unleash destructive and emotional tendencies.
4. Eating without dieting allowed Louderback and his wife to relax and feel better while maintaining the same weight.

Bill Fabrey, a young engineer at the time, read the article and contacted Louderback a few months later in 1968. Fabrey helped Louderback research his subsequent book, Fat Power, and Louderback supported Fabrey in founding the National Association to Aid Fat Americans (NAAFA) in 1969, a nonprofit human rights organization. NAAFA would subsequently change its name by the mid-1980s to the National Association to Advance Fat Acceptance.

In the early 1980s, four books collectively put forward ideas related to Health At Every Size. In Diets Don't Work (1982), Bob Schwartz encouraged "intuitive eating", as did Molly Groger in Eating Awareness Training (1986). Those authors believed this would result in weight loss as a side effect. William Bennett and Joel Gurin's The Dieter's Dilemma (1982), and Janet Polivy and C. Peter Herman's Breaking The Diet Habit (1983) argued that everybody has a natural weight and set-point, and that dieting for weight loss does not work.

According to Lindo Bacon, in Health at Every Size (2008), the basic premise of HAES is that "well-being and healthy habits are more important than any number on the scale." Emily Nagoski, in her book Come as You Are (2015), promoted the idea of Health at Every Size for improving women's self-confidence and sexual well-being.

== Concept ==
Proponents claim that evidence from certain scientific studies has provided some rationale for a shift in focus in health management from weight loss to a weight-neutral approach in individuals who have a high risk of type 2 diabetes and/or symptoms of cardiovascular disease, and that a weight-inclusive approach focusing on health biomarkers, instead of weight-normative approaches focusing on weight loss alone, provides greater health improvements.

=== Principles ===
The principles of HAES have been updated several times. Advocates claim: "How our society currently defines health is rooted in white supremacy, anti-Black racism, ableism, and healthism."

The HAES principles do not propose that people are automatically healthy at any size, but rather proposes that people should seek to adopt healthy behaviors regardless of their body weight.

=== Framework of Care ===
The Association for Size Diversity and Health (ASDAH) created a framework for healthcare providers in 2022-2024. These are the core guidelines for providing HAES-aligned care.

== Criticism ==
Amanda Sainsbury-Salis, an Australian medical researcher, calls for a rethink of the HAES concept, arguing it is not possible to be and remain truly healthy at every size, and suggests that a HAES focus may encourage people to ignore increasing weight, which her research states is easiest to lose soon after gaining. She does, however, note that it is possible to have healthy behaviours that provide health benefits at a wide variety of body sizes. Others similarly argue that the HAES focus may encourage people to delay attempts at weight loss indefinitely.

== Evidence ==
There is some evidence HAES interventions can lead to positive psychological, physical, and behavioral outcomes, including short-term decreased body weight, BMI and body fat mass. There were also some inconsistent findings suggesting an effect on blood pressure, fasting glucose, and triglycerides levels.

== See also ==
- Social stigma of obesity
- Fat acceptance movement
- Intuitive eating
