= FAT!SO? =

1998 book by Marilyn Wann

- Author: Marilyn Wann
- Language: English
- Subject: Fat acceptance movement
- Genre: Non-fiction
- Publisher: Ten Speed Press
- Publication date: 1998
- Publication place: United States
- Pages: 207
- ISBN: 978-0-89815-995-0
- OCLC: 39368330

FAT!SO?: Because You Don't Have To Apologize For Your Size! is an American non-fiction book by fat activist Marilyn Wann, published in 1998 by Ten Speed Press.

The book was followed a website of the same name created by Wann.

== Critical reception ==
Salon, "Reading "Fat!So?" probably won't make you love your body. But it might inspire you to hate it a little bit less.""
