= Body positivity =

Movement advocating accepting oneself and one's body

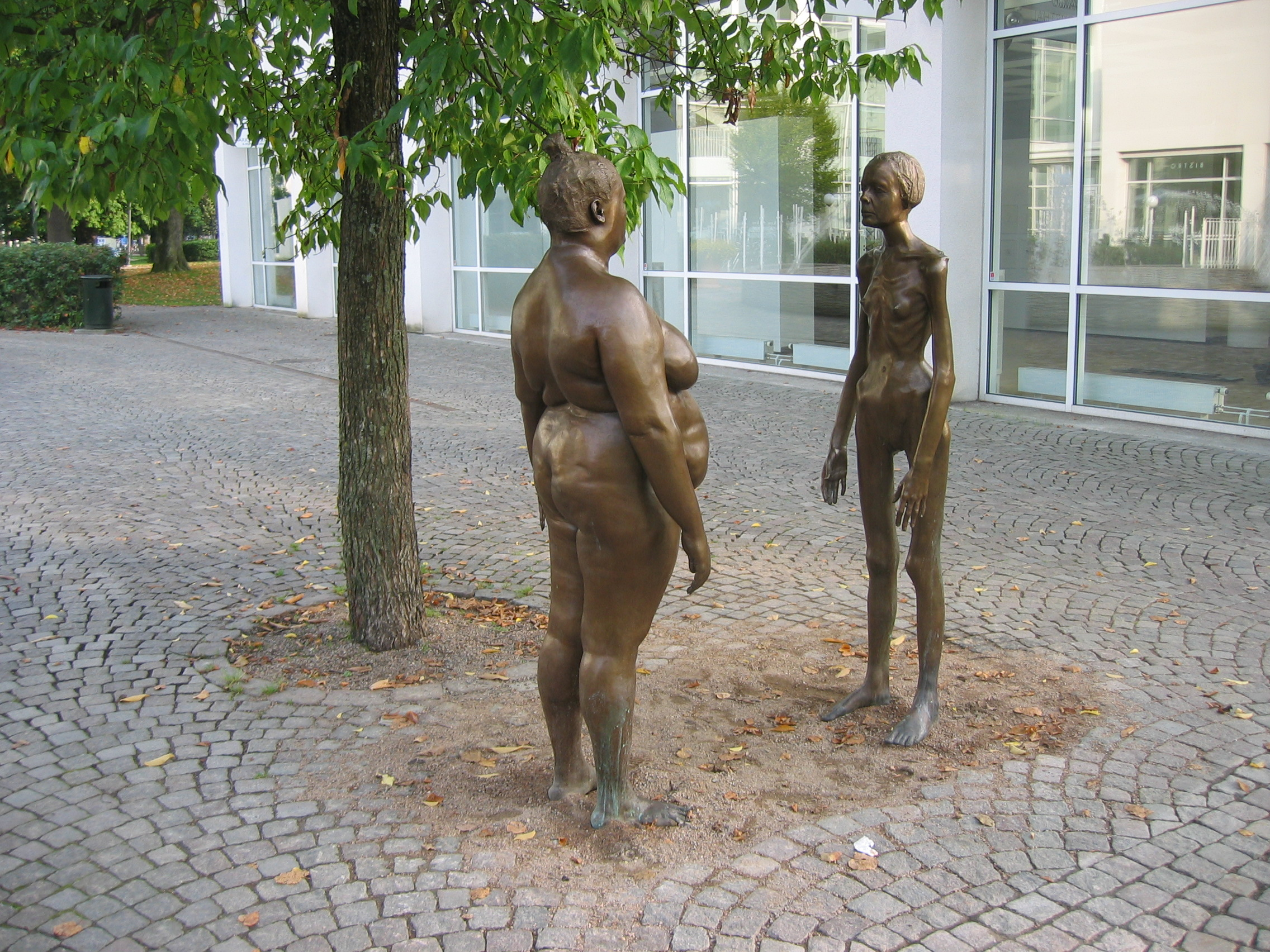
The sculpture of two women in bronze, Jag tänker på mig själv – Växjö ( 'I am thinking of myself – Växjö') by Marianne Lindberg De Geer, 2005, outside of the art museum of Växjö, Sweden. It depicts one thin woman and one fat woman and demonstrates society's infatuation with outward appearances. The sculpture has been a source of controversy in town, with both statues being vandalized and repaired during 2006.

Body positivity is a social movement that promotes a positive view of all bodies, regardless of size, shape, skin tone, gender, and physical abilities. Proponents focus on the appreciation of the functionality and health of the human body instead of its physical appearance.

This is related to the concept of body neutrality, which posits that a person's bodily appearance should have the least possible effect on their experience of life.

== Viewpoints ==
Body-positive advocates argue that body size—alongside race, gender, sexuality, and physical ability—is a key dimension through which individuals are socially valued or marginalized. Judgments about physical appearance, they contend, implicitly position individuals on a hierarchy of desirability, shaping their access to social power and influence. The movement seeks to challenge unrealistic standards of attractiveness, promote positive body image, and foster greater self-confidence. A central tenet of the movement is that beauty is a social construct and should not dictate an individual's confidence or sense of self-worth. It encourages people to cultivate self-love by not only accepting but actively embracing their physical characteristics.

Body positivity has roots in the fat acceptance movement and organizations such as the National Association to Advance Fat Acceptance. While fat acceptance primarily advocates for individuals classified as overweight or obese, body positivity is broader in scope, promoting inclusivity across all body types. The movement asserts that neither fat-shaming nor skinny-shaming is acceptable, and that all bodies can—and should—be celebrated.

Although body positivity is often associated with the celebration of physical appearance, many women also advocate for the normalization of body hair, bodily functions, and menstruation, challenging societal expectations surrounding female embodiment.

== History ==
The history of the fat acceptance movement can be dated back to 1967 when 500 people met in New York's Central Park to protest against anti-fat bias. Sociologist Charlotte Cooper has argued that the history of the fat activist movement is best understood in waves, similar to the feminist movement, with which she believes it is closely tied. Cooper believes that fat activists have suffered similar waves of activism followed by burnout, with activists in the following wave often unaware of the history of the movement, resulting in a lack of continuity.

Other scholars, such as Amy Erdman Farrell, have argued that the history of fat activism that traditionally gets told is a dominantly white history, and that the intersectional work of fat activists of color frequently gets overlooked within this traditional history.

== Psychology ==
The body positivity movement aims to change societal and individual perceptions of weight, size, and appearance to be more accepting of all bodies regardless of their diverse characteristics. An individual's perception of their body can greatly influence their mental health and overall well-being, particularly in teenagers. Poor body image, also known as body dissatisfaction, has been linked to a range of physical and mental health problems including anorexia, bulimia, depression, body image disturbance, and body dysmorphic disorder. Partakers are encouraged to view self-acceptance and self-love as traits that dignify the person.

The movement advocates against determining self-worth based on physical appearance or perceptions of one's own beauty. In the field of psychology, this is referred to as appearance-contingent self-worth, and can be highly detrimental to an individual's mental health. The degree to which one feels proud of their physical appearance is referred to as appearance self-esteem. People who fall under the appearance-contingent self-worth umbrella put great effort into looking their best so that they feel their best. This can be beneficial when an individual feels that they look good, but is extremely negative and anxiety-inducing when they do not.

== Inclusion ==
While body positivity has largely been discussed with regard to women, the body positivity movement may uplift people of all genders and sexes - as well as ages, races, ethnicities, sexual preferences, and religions. Although there is an underdiagnosis of body dysmorphic disorder, the clinical symptoms can affect people of any gender. Eating disorders in men are less commonly diagnosed and therefore less publicized.

The body positivity movement focuses largely on women, believing that women face more societal pressure to conform to beauty standards than men. Eating disorders are more common in women due to this social phenomenon. Nevertheless, men may face societal pressures to fit into a masculine physical ideal. Qualities that fit that mold are height, rectus abdominis muscle or "six pack abs", a broad upper body, muscular arms, shoulders, pectoral muscles, genital shape and size, etc. Men may face anxiety and pressure to shape their bodies to fit this mold and may struggle with body image disorders, including body dysmorphia, anorexia nervosa and bulimia nervosa.

== Brand influence and social media ==
Due to social media the notion "every body is beautiful" came into being. The movement for body positivity has played a role in influencing marketing campaigns for major corporations. In 2004, Dove launched their "Real Beauty" campaign, in which advertisements depicted women of varying body types and skin tones in a manner that portrayed acceptance and positivity towards their bodies. On their website, Dove presents its Dove Self-Esteem Project as a mission for "helping young people reach their full potential by delivering quality body confidence and self-esteem education". The company also partners with and raises money for eating disorder organizations.

In 2017, the American women's underwear company Aerie launched a campaign called "AerieReal", in which the company promised to not retouch or edit their models, encouraging body positivity and body-acceptance despite features such as cellulite, stretch marks, or fat rolls. Aerie has begun featuring body positive influencers in their photo shoots and advertising campaigns, as well as plus sized models. To accommodate the last, the brand has launched a plus size clothing line.

In 2019, Decathlon joined the efforts of other companies with their #LeggingsForEverybody campaign, stating their mission as "to boost body confidence and support you in your fitness journey".

Recently, paradigms on social media have been changing from pushing feminine beauty ideals to challenging those ideals through image related empowerment and inspiration. Several influencers such as AerieReal model Iskra Lawrence have been preaching body positivity, creating hashtags such as #IWokeUpLikeThis, #EffYourBeautyStandards, #HonorMyCurves, #CelebrateMySize, #GoldenConfidence, and #ImNoModelEither.

Social media plays a pivotal role in the body positivity movement, in part by providing education and exposure on different body types. Instagram and Facebook are some social platforms that, as of 2019, have body positive policies that cause advertisements for cosmetic surgery, weight loss supplements, and detox products, to be hidden from underaged demographics. In addition to promoting positive body image, these policies aim to curb the advertisement of supplements unregulated by the Food and Drug Administration (FDA). Social media platforms such as Instagram are frequently used to post body positivity content and fuel related discussion.

Although studies about social media and body image are still in their early stages, there seems to be a correlation between social media use and body image concerns. Body image tends to be positively or negatively affected by the content to which people are exposed on social media. The action of people uploading pictures of themselves appears to effectuate a negative body image.

== Criticism ==
The body positivity movement has been criticized for encouraging lifestyle habits that negatively affect one's health. A central complaint is that excessive approval of overweight and obese individuals could dissuade them from desiring to improve their health, leading to lifestyle disease. Among health professionals, agreement with the movement is very low. A 2012 study found that among a sample of 1,130 trainee dietitians, nutritionists, nurses and medical doctors, only 1.4% had "positive or neutral attitudes" regarding excess body fat.

The movement has also faced criticism from feminists. Gender scholar Amber E. Kinser wrote that posting an unedited photo of your body to a social media website, which is an example of an action associated with the movement, does little to prevent women's worth from being directly correlated to their physical appearance.

With the majority of the body positivity movement recently occurring on Instagram, a study published in 2019 found that 40 percent of body positivity posts were centered around appearance. With Instagram being a photo-sharing social media site, the effort to place the focus less on appearance has been criticized to be contradictory.

Another criticism is that the movement puts too much emphasis on the role of the individual to improve their own body image, and not enough attention on identifying and eliminating the cultural forces, messages, beliefs, and advertising campaigns accountable for causing widespread body dissatisfaction.

The criticism has also been leveled that the movement can impair one's agency and authenticity. Researcher Lisa Legault argues that an undue emphasis on body positivity can "stifle and diminish important negative feelings." She explains that negative feelings are a natural part of the human experience and that such feelings can be important and informational. She says "ignoring negative feelings and experiences exerts a cost to authenticity and self-integration." The movement, Legault argues, cannot make it seem like a person should only feel positive emotions. This expectation to have only positive feelings is sometimes called "toxic body positivity".

From these criticisms, the counter movement of body neutrality arose. It holds the belief that it does not matter whether one thinks their body is beautiful or not; psychologist Susan Albers, PsyD, notes that the difference between body neutrality and body positivity is that with body neutrality, "Your value is not tied to your body nor does your happiness depend on what you look like. A body-positive approach says you are beautiful no matter what."

== Positive effects ==
Understanding the positive impacts of body positivity has allowed society to embrace new ways of thinking about the self and individual bodies. According to Chef Sky Hanka, there are different ways to love your body but also let go of negativity. The idea of body positivity can result in individuals feeling more optimistic about their bodies, which can lead to improved self-esteem and overall self-confidence. Embracing body positivity starts with thoughts, words, and actions. Individuals spend the most time with themselves, so they must not break their relationship with themselves. When embracing body positivity, a person should not beat themselves up if there are moments when they are struggling with their body image. Working with body positivity, step by step – will eventually improve one's self-esteem.

A healthy person often has a relationship with their body. Because they are motivated by self-care rather than shame or guilt, people who are body positive engage in healthy habits like exercise and balanced eating. Positive emotions can enhance physical health. Body positivity requires one to practice positive thinking towards their body. Some of the physical health benefits of this way of thinking are "increased lifespan", "lower levels of distress and pain", "greater resistance to illnesses", "reduced risk of death from respiratory conditions", and "reduced risk of death from infections." Practicing body positivity will help increase an individual's desire for self-care, leading to better habit-building and helping them define what wellness means to them.

It also improves mental health. One can reduce anxiety and depression by being body positive. Having a positive approach to life and accepting uncomfortable situations has proven to help keep one's mind healthy and resilient. Body positivity is "the mindset that everyone is worthy of love and a positive body image, regardless of how the media and society tries to define beauty or the ideal body type." When individuals have a positive body image, they reduce the development of anxiety and depression.

== See also ==
- Awoulaba
- Body shaming
- Duane Bryers
- Fat acceptance movement
- Fattitude – 2017 documentary
- Height discrimination
- Lookism
- Sex-positive movement
- Sizeism
