= Charlotte Cooper (author) =

British writer

Charlotte Cooper (born 1968) is a London-based British writer and outspoken advocate for gay rights and fat acceptance.

== Biography ==
She describes herself as "queer, from a working-class background, white, middle-aged, and have a load of higher education. I have poly relationships and am sort-of femme". Cooper is both an academic and mainstream author. She has published articles in academic journals such as Disability and Society and is herself a board member of Fat Studies: An Interdisciplinary Journal of Body Weight and Society. She has written many articles on fat acceptance and gay rights issues for websites, magazines and newspapers, including Diva, the UK's leading lesbian magazine, and UK national newspaper The Guardian. Cooper is also news editor for RainbowNetwork.com, the largest gay and lesbian portal in the UK. She is a prolific author of zines and performs in the queercore band Homosexual Death Drive.

Charlotte Cooper describes her approach to fat activism:

I challenge biomedical discourse on fat through my activism. Many fat activists are interested in countering obesity discourse claims, but my interests are in creating communities and cultures, and in documenting fat activist histories, that are somewhat autonomous and exist beyond the boundaries of medicalisation... It does not answer to biomedical discourse, it is something else entirely that is built on the creativity and sheer badassery of fat people. It shows that there are other ways of thinking about fat, and embodying fatness.

Cooper's 2002 novel, Cherry, about a young woman's experience and discovery of lesbianism, attracted controversy when copies were impounded by Canadian Customs officers. Reasons given were the scenes of fisting and golden showers.

In 2007, Cooper coined the term "headless fatty" to describe negative media representations of fat people.

In 2010, Cooper was a Government of Ireland Ph.D. scholar at Limerick University where she wrote a history of the fat activist movement in which she argued that it is closely allied with the feminist movement and, like it, has undergone waves of activity.

Cooper has co-produced a number of events with fat activism themes including 'The Fat of the Land', 'Big Bum Jumble' and 2012's 'Fattylympics', a protest against both attitudes to fat and the London 2012 Olympics, held in Stratford, where she lives.

== Books ==
- Fat and Proud: The Politics of Size (1998, ISBN 9780704344730)
- Cherry (2002, ISBN 9781873741733)
- Fat Activism: A Radical Social Movement (2016, ISBN 9781910849002)
- Fat Activist Vernacular (2019, ISBN 9780993532023)

== Journal articles ==
- Cooper, C. (1997). "Can a Fat Woman Call Herself Disabled?". Disability and Society. 12 (1): 31–41. doi:10.1080/09687599727443.
- Cooper, C. (2003). "Swing it Baby!". Journal of Bisexuality. 3 (3–4): 87–92. doi:10.1300/j159v03n03_06. S2CID 144191391.
- Cooper, C. (2010). "Fat Studies: Mapping the Field". Sociology Compass. 4 (12): 1020–1034. doi:10.1111/j.1751-9020.2010.00336.x.
- Cooper, C. (2012). "A Queer and Trans Fat Activist Timeline: Queering Fat Activist Nationality and Cultural Imperialism". Fat Studies. 1 (1): 61–74. doi:10.1080/21604851.2012.627503. S2CID 144691580.
- Cooper, C.; S. Murray (2012). "Fat Activist Community: A Conversation Piece". Somatechnics. 2 (1): 127–138. doi:10.3366/soma.2012.0045.

== See also ==
- Fat acceptance movement
- Fat feminism
