= National Association to Advance Fat Acceptance =

American non-profit organization

- Abbreviation: NAAFA
- Formation: 1969
- Founder: Bill Fabrey
- Founded at: New York City
- Executive Director: Tigress Osborn
- Website: https://naafa.org

The National Association to Advance Fat Acceptance (NAAFA) is a non-profit, fat acceptance civil rights oriented organization in the United States dedicated to improving the quality of life for the obese. NAAFA works to eliminate discrimination based on body size and provide fat people with the tools for self-empowerment through public education, advocacy, and member support.

== History ==
NAAFA was founded in 1969 by Bill Fabrey in Rochester, New York as the "National Association to Aid Fat Americans." In its early years, social activities and letter-writing campaigns were a major part of the organization. As the organization turned more toward political activism, the name was changed during the 1980s.

NAAFA has a yearly national convention in summer, which is usually alternated between the east and west coasts. In 2008 they introduced the "NAAFA Size Diversity Toolkit" to educate corporations on quality of life issues. As part of its ongoing campaign, NAAFA also opposes airline policies regarding charging fat people for each seat they use.

== In popular culture ==
- Penn and Teller featured NAAFA (in an episode called "Obesity") on the Showtime series Bullshit! (March 24, 2007).
- NAAFA is parodied in the animated sitcom Family Guy as the "National Association for the Advancement of Fat People."
- NAAFA is parodied in The Simpsons episode, Walking Big & Tall as the organization, Big is Beautiful.
