= Fat acceptance movement =

Social movement against anti-fat bias

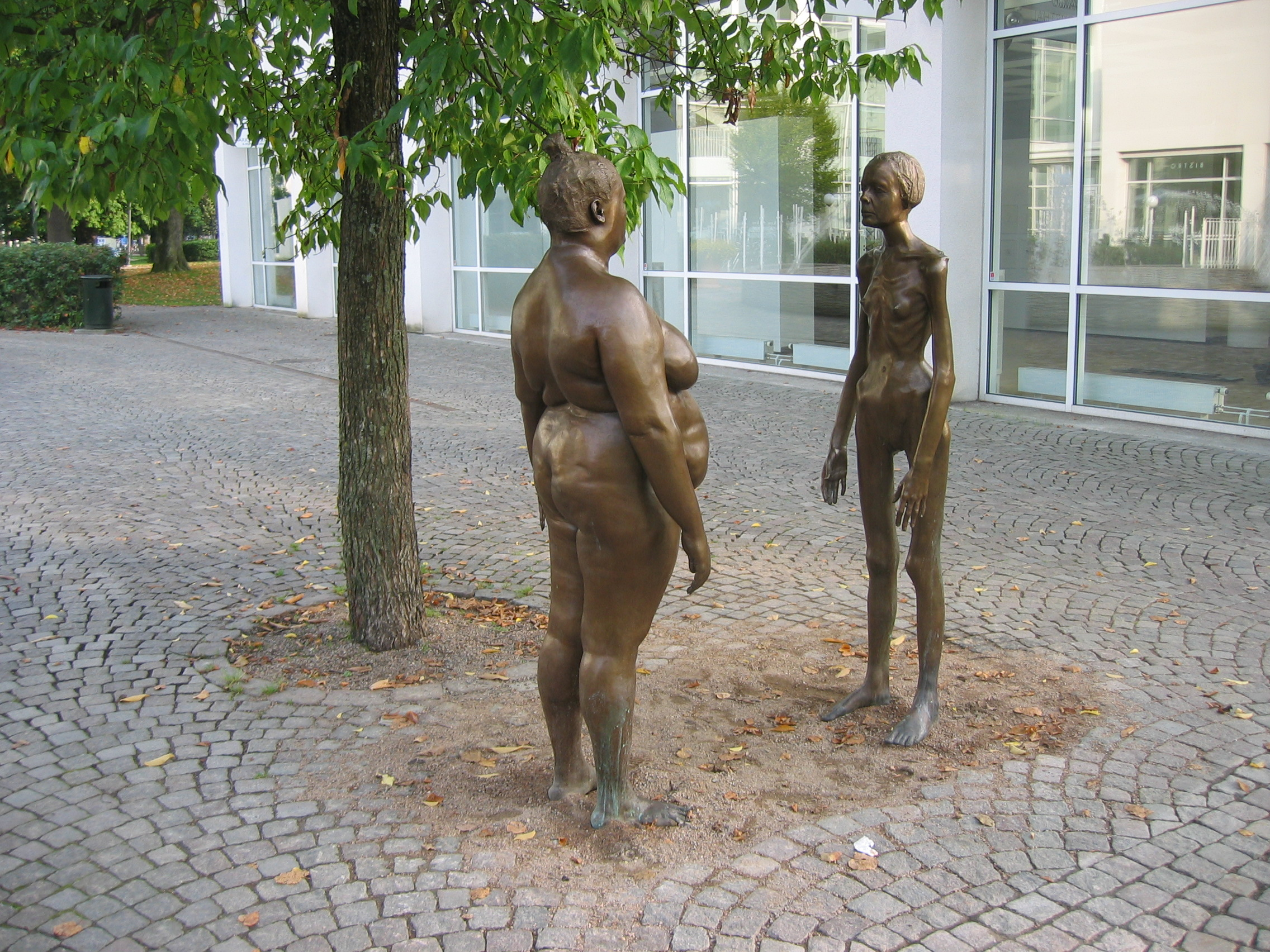
Sculpture in Växjö intended to criticise modern beauty standards

The fat acceptance movement (also known as fat pride, fat empowerment, fat liberation, and fat activism) is a social movement which seeks to eliminate the social stigma of obesity. Areas of contention include the aesthetic, legal, and medical approaches to fat people.

The modern fat acceptance movement began in the late 1960s. Besides its political role, the fat acceptance movement also constitutes a subculture which acts as a social group for its members. The fat acceptance movement has been criticized for not adding value to the debate over human health, with some critics accusing the movement of "promoting a lifestyle that can have dire health consequences".

== History ==
The history of the fat acceptance movement can be dated back to 1967 when 500 people met in New York's Central Park to protest against anti-fat bias. Sociologist Charlotte Cooper has argued that the history of the fat activist movement is best understood in waves, similar to the feminist movement, with which she believes it is closely tied. Cooper believes that fat activists have suffered similar waves of activism followed by burnout, with activists in the following wave often unaware of the history of the movement, resulting in a lack of continuity.

Other scholars, such as Amy Erdman Farrell, have argued that the history of fat activism that traditionally gets told is a dominantly white history, and that the intersectional work of fat activists of color frequently gets overlooked within this traditional history.

=== Victorian Dress Reform Movement (1850s–1890s) ===
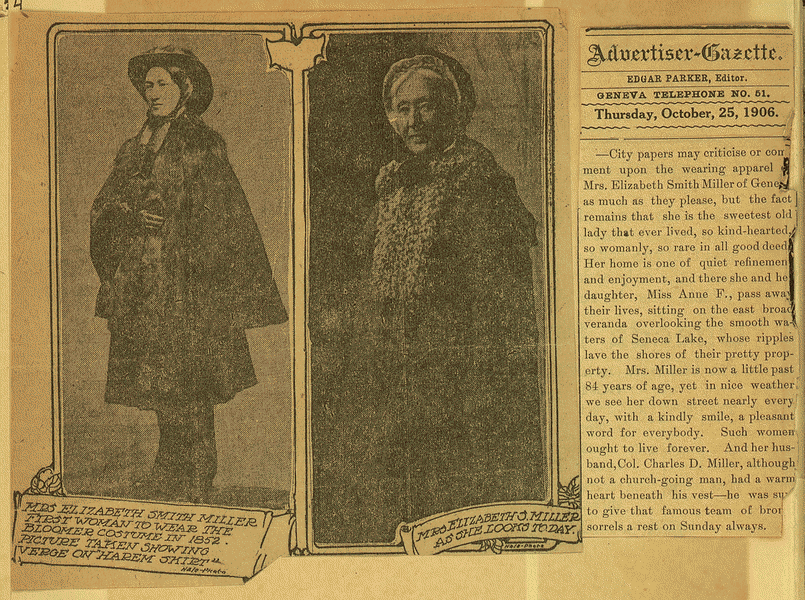
Elizabeth Smith Miller, best known for being the first woman to wear the costume of Turkish pantaloons and knee-length skirts. She contributed to the Victorian Dress Reform, a specific event that shaped the modern body positivity movement.

As part of the first wave of feminism from the 1850s-1890s, the Victorian dress reform movement aimed to put an end to the trend of women having to modify their bodies through use of corsets and tightlacing in order to fit the societal standard of tiny waistlines. A minority of women participated in this tradition of conformity, but often ended up facing ridicule whether or not they were successful at shrinking their waistline. The practice of tight-lacing proved to have many negative health risks, such as damage to their internal organs, including deformation to the ribcage and stomach atrophy due to the tight lacing. Depending on the type of corset and the lacing, the damage could be irreversible and was also extremely uncomfortable for women who partook. Women were mocked for their egotism if they were not able to shrink their waistline, and they were criticized for too small a waistline if they were successful. This instilled a feeling of defeat in women during these times, as nothing they did seemed to satisfy their male counterparts. As part of the Victorian Dress Reform Movement, women also fought for their right to dress in pants. Acceptance of all body types – regardless of waist measurements – was the major theme of the Victorian Dress Reform Movement, and this was the first movement of its kind.

=== First wave (1960s) ===
First wave activities consisted of isolated activists drawing attention to the dominant model of obesity and challenging it as only one of several possible models. This kind of political climate was the background of the fat acceptance movement, which originated in the late 1960s. Like other social movements from this period, the fat acceptance movement, initially known as "Fat Pride", "Fat Power", or "Fat Liberation", often consisted of people acting in an impromptu fashion.

In 1967, New York radio host Steve Post held a "fat-in" in Central Park. This event involved a group of people who were partaking while holding posters of a famous thin woman and setting diet books on fire. He described the purpose of the event "was to protest discrimination against the fat." This moment is often cited as the beginning of fat acceptance movement. Five months after the "fat-in", Lew Louderback composed an essay entitled "More People Should be Fat!" as a result of him witnessing the discrimination his wife experienced for her size.

The essay shed light on the discrimination fat people experience in America and the culture surrounding fat-shaming. Louderback's contribution inspired the creation of the National Association to Advance Fat Acceptance (NAAFA) in 1969 by Bill Fabrey, with the mission of ending discrimination based on body weight.

In 1967, Lew Louderback wrote an article in the Saturday Evening Post called "More People Should be FAT" in response to discrimination against his wife. The article led to a meeting between Louderback and William Fabrey, who went on to found the first organization for fat people and their supporters, originally named the 'National Association to Aid Fat Americans' and currently called the National Association to Advance Fat Acceptance (NAAFA). NAAFA was founded in America, in 1969, by Bill Fabrey in response to discrimination against his wife. He primarily intended it to campaign for fat rights, however, a reporter attending the 2001 NAAFA conference notes that few attendees were active in fat rights politics and that most women came to shop for fashion, wear it on the conference catwalk or to meet a potential partner. Since 1991, Fabrey has worked as a director with the Council on Size and Weight Discrimination, specializing in the history of the size acceptance movement.

In 1972, the feminist group The Fat Underground was formed. It began as a radical chapter of NAAFA and spun off to become independent when NAAFA expressed concerns about its promotion of a stronger activist philosophy. The FU were inspired by and, in some cases, members of the Radical Therapy Collective, a feminist group that believed that many psychological problems were caused by oppressive social institutions and practices. Founded by Sara Fishman (then Sara Aldebaran) and Judy Freespirit, the Fat Underground took issue with what they saw as a growing bias against obesity in the scientific community. They coined the saying, "a diet is a cure that doesn't work, for a disease that doesn't exist". Shortly afterward, Fishman moved to Connecticut, where, along with Karen Scott-Jones, she founded the New Haven Fat Liberation Front, an organization similar to the Fat Underground in its scope and focus. In 1983, the two groups collaborated to publish a seminal book in the field of fat activism, Shadow on a Tightrope, which collected several fat activist position papers initially distributed by the Fat Underground, as well as poems and essays from other writers.

In 1979, Carole Shaw coined the term Big Beautiful Woman (BBW) and launched a fashion and lifestyle magazine of the same name aimed at plus-sized women. The original print magazine ceased publication in May 2003, but continued in various online formats. The term "BBW" has become widely used to refer to any fat woman (sometimes in a derogatory way). Several other periodicals focusing on fashion and lifestyle for "fuller-figured" women were published in print from the early 1980s to the mid 2010s. From 1984 to 2000, Radiance: The Magazine for Large Women was published in print to "support women 'all sizes of large in living proud, full, active lives, at whatever weight, with self-love and self-respect."

In the UK, the London Fat Women's Group was formed, the first British fat activist group, and was active between approximately 1985 and 1989. Other first wave activities included the productions of zines such as Figure 8 and Fat!So? by Marilyn Wann. The latter went on to become a book of the same name.

=== Second wave (1990s) ===
The second wave of the body positivity movement prioritized providing people of all sizes a place where they could comfortably come together and exercise. There were programs being made specifically for overweight people, such as Making Waves. Home exercise programs like Genia Pauli Haddon and Linda DeMarco's home exercise video series Yoga For Round Bodies were also made for those who were not comfortable joining a wellness community. During the 1990s, dangers in dieting were found, mostly saying that it was ineffective and caused more physical and psychological problems than it solved. Dieting, especially in the context of fad diets, begun to be seen as a money-making ploy and proven to not actually work, especially in the long term.

In the second wave, the fat acceptance movement became more widespread in the US and started to spread to other countries. Ideas from the movement began to appear in the mainstream. Publishers became more willing to publish fat acceptance themed literature. The 1980s witnessed an increase in activist organizations, publications, and conferences.

In 1989, a group of people including actress Anne Zamberlan formed the first French organization for fat acceptance, Allegro fortissimo. Organizations began holding conferences and conventions, including NAAFA. By the 1990s, input from the fat acceptance movement began to be incorporated into research papers by some members of the medical professions such as new anti-dieting programs and models of obesity management.

=== Third wave (2010s) ===
The fat acceptance movement saw a diversification of projects during the third wave in the 2010s and early 2020s. Activities have addressed issues of both fat and race, class, sexuality, and other issues. Size discrimination has been increasingly addressed in the arts, as well.

The third wave arose largely as a response to the increase in social media culture and advertisements. The rise of Instagram inspired a debate about cultural beauty standards, and the body positivity movement arose as a response and argument in favor of embracing all body types, loving, and feeling confident about one's own body even with any flaws. Since 2012, there has been a heightened presence of the movement, although corporations have capitalized on the sentiments in order to sell products.

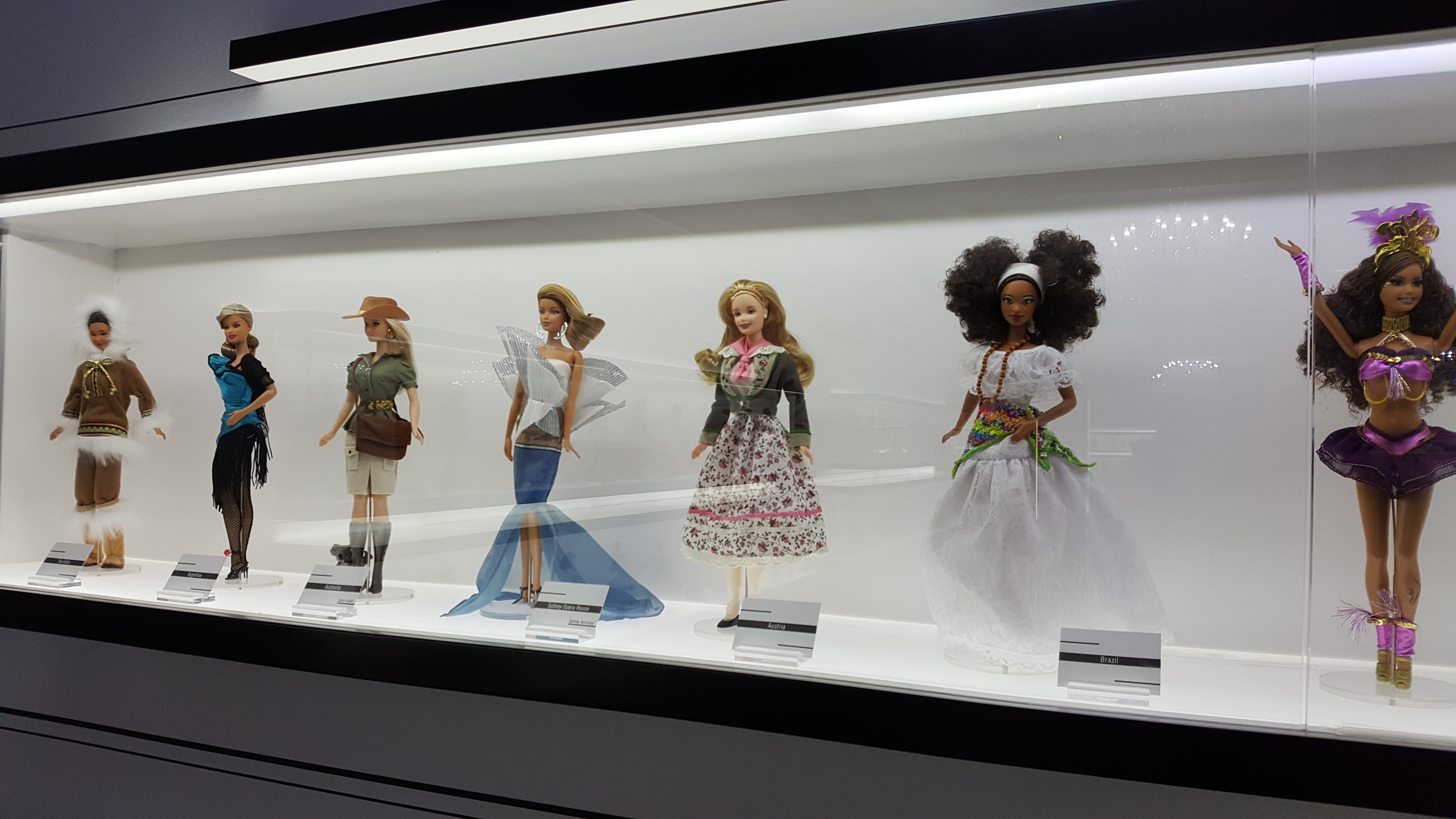

The movement challenged ideals including unblemished skin and slim "beach bodies". Model and feminist Tess Holliday founded '@EffYourBeautyStandards', which brought an outpour of support to the body positivity movement. After founding the movement, the size-26 Holliday was signed to Milk Management, a large model agency in Europe, as their first model over size 20. Instagram has been utilized as an advertising platform for the movement since. Pioneers connect with brands and advertisers to promote the movement. In 2016, Mattel released a new line of Barbie dolls under the name Fashionistas with three different body shapes, seven skin colors, twenty-two eye colors and twenty-four hairstyles to be more inclusive. (Note: Mattel's (manufacturer of Barbie) website) Additionally, in the spring 2019 New York Fashion Week, a total of 49 models that were considered plus-size made an appearance in 12 shows. These plus-size models were also hired to be featured on fashion campaigns as well as magazine covers.

== Campaigning themes ==
The fat acceptance movement argues that fat people are targets of hatred and discrimination. In particular, advocates suggest obese women are subjected to more social pressure than obese men. The movement argues that these attitudes comprise a fat phobic entrenched societal norm, evident in many social institutions, including the mass media, where fat people are often ridiculed, or held up as objects of pity. Discrimination includes a lack of equal access to transportation and employment. Members of the fat acceptance movement perceive negative societal attitudes as persistent, and as being based on the presumption that fatness reflects negatively on a person's character. Fat activists push for change in societal, personal, and medical attitudes toward fat people. Fat acceptance organizations engage in public education about what they describe as myths concerning fat people.

=== Discrimination ===
Fat people experience many different kinds of discrimination because of their weight. This discrimination appears in healthcare, employment, education, personal relationships, and the media. Fat individuals also argue clothing stores discriminate against them. For example, some women have complained that "one size fits all" stores, which offer a single size for each item, do not cater to those above a certain weight. Public transport has also been subject to criticism due to lack of inclusivity to fat people as seats and walkways are often too small to accommodate them.

On the subject of horseback riding, there has been disagreement between fat acceptance activists and animal rights activists.

=== Health ===
Fat activists argue that anti-fat stigma and aggressive diet promotion have led to an increase in psychological and physiological problems among fat people. For instance, individuals who experience weight discrimination have reported facing more psychological distress, more loneliness, and lower well-being. Along with this, weight discrimination can heighten risk for obesity, chronic inflammation, and disease burden. People can indulge in health-risk behaviors, such as avoiding physical activity. Experiencing and internalizing weight stigma are identified as critical risk factors leading to eating pathology. Concerns are also raised that modern culture's focus on weight loss does not have a foundation in scientific research, but instead is an example of using science as a means to control deviance, as a part of society's attempt to deal with something that it finds disturbing. Diet critics cite the high failure rate of permanent weight-loss attempts, and the dangers of "yo-yo" weight fluctuations and weight-loss surgeries. Fat activists argue that the health issues of obesity and being overweight have been exaggerated or misrepresented, and that health issues are used as a cover for cultural and aesthetic prejudices against fat.

Proponents of fat acceptance maintain that people of all shapes and sizes can strive for fitness and physical health. They believe that healthy behaviors can be independent of body weight. Informed by this approach, psychologists who were unhappy with the treatment of fat people in the medical world initiated the Health at Every Size movement. It has five basic tenets: (1) enhancing health, (2) size and self-acceptance (3) the pleasure of eating well, (4) the joy of movement, and (5) an end to weight bias.

Some proponents also claim that people with obesity can be metabolically healthy. Some medical studies have challenged that "healthy obesity" concept, although the definitions of metabolically healthy obesity are not standardized across studies.

=== Gender ===
==== Fat women ====
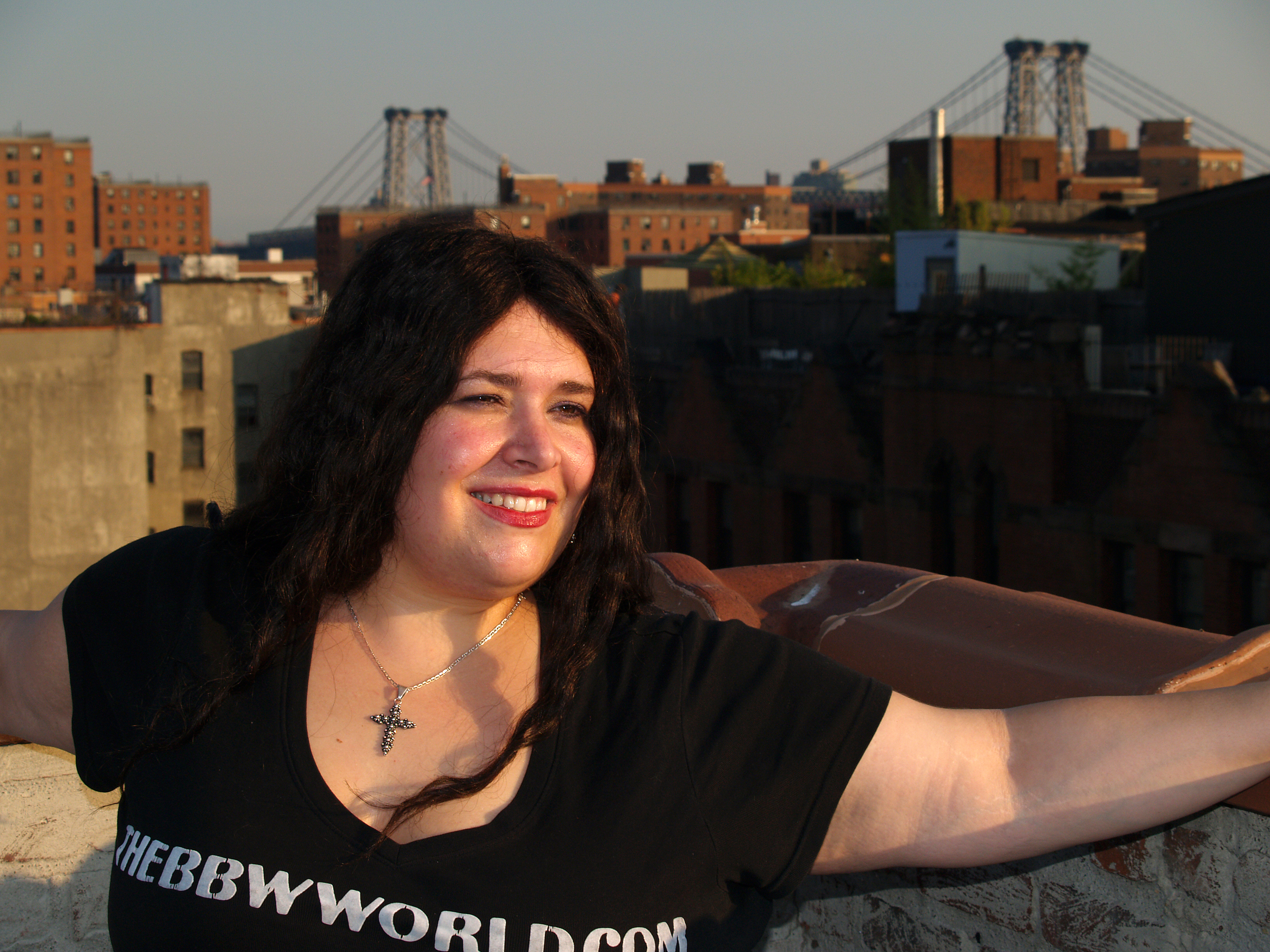
Documentary filmmaker Kira Nerusskaya released her film The BBW World: Under the Fat! In 2008.

The issues faced by fat women in society have been a central theme of the fat acceptance movement since its inception. Although the first organization, National Association to Advance Fat Acceptance, and the first book, Fat Power (1970), were both created by men, in each case they were responses to weight discrimination experienced by their wives. Women soon started campaigning on their behalf with the first feminist group, 'The Fat Underground', being formed in 1973. Issues addressed regarding women have included body image, and in particular the thin ideal and its effect on women. Critics say NAAFA, which opposes dieting and weight-loss surgery, is an apologist for an unhealthy lifestyle. But NAAFA says it does no such thing, that some people are just bigger and no less deserving of the same rights as everyone else.

==== Fat men ====
The fat acceptance movement has primarily focused on a feminist model of patriarchal oppression of fat women, most clearly represented by the encouragement of women to diet. However, Sander L. Gilman argues that, until the 20th century, dieting has historically been a man's activity. He continues, "Obesity eats away at the idealized image of the masculine just as surely as it does the idealized image of the feminine." William Banting was the author of an 1863 booklet called Letter On Corpulence, which modern diets have used as a model. Men respond to being overweight differently, (i.e., having a Body Mass Index of 25 or more), being half as likely as women to diet, a quarter as likely to undergo weightloss surgery and only a fifth as likely to report feeling shame about their weight. Irmgard Tischner identifies this behavior as rooted in notions of masculinity that require disregard for healthcare: "Men do not have to care about their size or health, as they have women to care about those things for them".

Some gay men have moved beyond disregard for size to fat acceptance and fat activism with movements like chub culture, which started as Girth & Mirth clubs in San Francisco in 1976 and the bear culture which fetishizes big, hairy men. Ganapati Durgadas argues that fat bisexual and gay men "are reminders of the feminine stigma with which heterosexism still tars queer men". In a comparison of queer fat positive zines, the lesbian-produced Fat Girl was found to have political debate content absent from gay male orientated zines such as Bulk Male and Big Ad. Joel Barraquiel Tan comments: "If fat is a feminist issue, then fat or heft is a fetishized one for gay men. Gay men tend to sexualize difference, where lesbians have historically politicized it."

A fat heterosexual man is known as a "Big Handsome Man" (BHM), in counterpart to a Big Beautiful Woman. Like some fat and gay men, BHMs have sexualized their difference and receive validation of this identity from BBWs or straight women known as "Female Fat Admirers".

=== Legislation ===
In the 1970s, fat people in the United States began seeking legal redress for discrimination based on weight, primarily in the workplace but also for being denied access to, or treated differently in regards to, services or entertainment. The results of these cases have varied considerably, although in some instances the Americans with Disabilities Act (ADA) has been successfully used to argue cases of discrimination against fat people. Roth and Solovay argue that, as with transgender people, a major cause for the variation in success is the extent to which litigants are apologetic for their size (with more apologetic plaintiffs finding more success):

What is the difference between a million-dollar weight case award and a losing case? Like the difference between many winning and losing transgender cases, it's all about the attitude. Does the claimant's attitude and experience about weight/gender reinforce or challenge dominant stereotypes? Winning cases generally adopt a legal posture that reinforces social prejudices. Cases that challenge societal prejudices generally lose.

The Americans with Disabilities Act continues to be used as there is no USA federal law against weight discrimination; however, the state of Michigan passed a law against weight discrimination in 1976. The cities of Washington, D.C., San Francisco (2000), Santa Cruz, Binghamton, Urbana (1990s), New York (2023), and Madison (1970s) have also passed laws prohibiting weight discrimination. In the cities that have a weight discrimination law, it is rare for more than one case a year to be brought, except for San Francisco which may have as many as six. Opinions amongst city enforcement workers vary as to why the prosecution numbers are so low, although they all suggested that both overweight people and employers were unaware of the protective legislation and it was also noted that the cities with anti-weight discrimination laws tended to be liberal college towns.

Not all legal changes have protected the rights of fat people. Despite recommendations from the Equal Employment Opportunity Commission to the contrary, in 2009 the United States Court of Appeals for the Sixth Circuit decided that fat people will only qualify as disabled if it can be proved that their weight is caused by an underlying condition, supporting the concept that being obese is not inherently a disability. The Supreme Court of Texas came to a similar conclusion in 2023. But in 2018, the Washington Supreme Court provided weight-related disability bias protection without evidence of a related medical condition. Other countries besides the United States have considered legislation to protect the rights of fat people. In the UK an All-Party Parliamentary Group published a report in 2012 called Reflections on Body Image that found that one in five British people had been victimized because of their weight. The report recommended that Members of Parliament investigated putting "appearance-based discrimination" under the same legal basis as sexual or racial discrimination via the Equality Act 2010 which makes it illegal to harass, victimize or discriminate against anyone in the workplace based on several named categories, including size or weight. The Equality Act came into force on 1 October 2010, it brings together over 116 separate pieces of legislation into one single Act. The Act provides a legal framework to protect the rights of individuals and advance equality of opportunity for all.

=== Fat studies ===
There has also been an emerging body of academic studies called Fat Studies. Marilyn Wann argues that fat studies moved beyond being an individual endeavor to being a field of study with the 2004 conference Fat Attitudes: An Examination of an American Subculture and the Representation of the Female Body. The American Popular Culture Association regularly includes panels on the subject. In many colleges, student groups with a fat activist agenda have emerged, including Hampshire, Smith, and Antioch. Fat studies are now available as an interdisciplinary course of study at some colleges, taking a similar approach to other identity studies such as women's studies, queer studies, and African American studies. As of 2011, there were two Australian courses and ten American courses that were primarily focused on fat studies or Health at Every Size, and numerous other courses that had some fat acceptance content. Taylor & Francis publish an online Fat Studies journal. The first national Fat Studies seminar was held at York in May 2008, leading to the 2009 publication Fat Studies in the UK, edited by Corinna Tomrley and Ann Kalosky Naylor.

== Division within the movement ==
The fat acceptance movement has been divided in its response to proposed legislation defining morbidly obese people as disabled. NAAFA board member Peggy Howell says: "There's a lot of conflict in the size acceptance community over this. I don't consider myself disabled, and some people don't like 'fat' being considered a disability." An example of the positive perspective of obesity being classified as a disability in wider society is noted by a person interviewed by Amy Erdman in her book Fat Shame: "[Deborah Harper] makes a point to tell me how impressed she is with the way many do make quiet and polite accommodations for her." Women are particularly active within the fat acceptance movement and membership of fat acceptance organizations is dominated by middle-class women in the heaviest 1–2% of the population. Members have criticized the lack of representation in the movement from men, people of color, and people of lower socioeconomic status.

== Criticism ==
The fat acceptance movement has been criticized from several perspectives. The primary criticism is that fat acceptance ignores studies that have shown health issues to be linked to obesity and hence encourages an unhealthy lifestyle. In 2008, Lily-Rygh Glen, a writer, musician, and former fat acceptance activist, interviewed multiple women who claimed to be rejected by their peers within the movement and labeled "traitors" when they changed their diets.

=== Medical criticism ===
Human health is a multi-faceted issue; more and more rigorous scientific research reveals the relationship between weight and health is complex. The fat acceptance movement has been criticized for not adding value to the debate over human health, with some critics accusing the movement of "promoting a lifestyle that can have dire health consequences". There is a considerable amount of evidence that being obese is connected to increased all-cause mortality and diseases, and significant weight loss (>10%), using a variety of diets, improves or reverses metabolic syndromes and other health outcomes associated with obesity. Barry Franklin, director of a cardio rehab facility, stated: "I don't want to take on any specific organization but... A social movement that would suggest health at any size in many respects can be misleading." Franklin also agrees that fit people who are obese have cardiovascular mortality rates that are lower than thin, unfit people, and proponents of the fat acceptance movement argue that people of all shapes and sizes can choose behaviors that support their fitness and physical health.

== See also ==
- Body positivity
  - Epidemiology of obesity
- Health At Every Size
- Fat tax
- Hanne Blank
- Obesity paradox
- Plus-size model
