= Robert Rose =

Robert, Bob, or Bobby Rose may refer to:

== Law and politics ==
- Robert S. Rose (1774–1835), American politician
- Robert L. Rose (1804–1877), American politician
- Robert R. Rose Jr. (1915–1997), American jurist in Wyoming
- Bob Rose (Manitoba Liberal) (born 1931), Canadian politician
- Bob Rose (politician, born 1933) (1933–2000), Canadian politician
- Robert E. Rose (1939–2022), American politician in Nevada

== Sports ==
- Bob Rose (footballer) (1928–2003), Australian rules footballer and coach
- Robert Rose (Australian sportsman) (1952–1999), Australian rules footballer and cricketer
- Robert Rose (basketball) (born 1964), American/Australian basketball player
- Bobby Rose (baseball) (born 1967), American baseball player
- Robert Rose (gridiron football) (born 1987), American football player

== Others ==
- Robert Rose (poet) (died 1849), West Indian born English poet
- Robert F. Rose (1868–1924), American journalist
- Robert Hugh Rose (1876–1960), American dietitian
- Robert John Rose (1930–2022), American Roman Catholic prelate
- Robert N. Rose (born 1951), American cybersecurity expert
- Kevin Rose (Robert Kevin Rose, born 1977), American media personality

== See also ==
- Bert Rose (1919–2001), American football executive
- Bob Roses (born 1947), American politician
- Robert Rosen (disambiguation)
- Bob & Rose, a British television drama
