= Gluttony =

Over-indulgence and over-consumption, such as of food

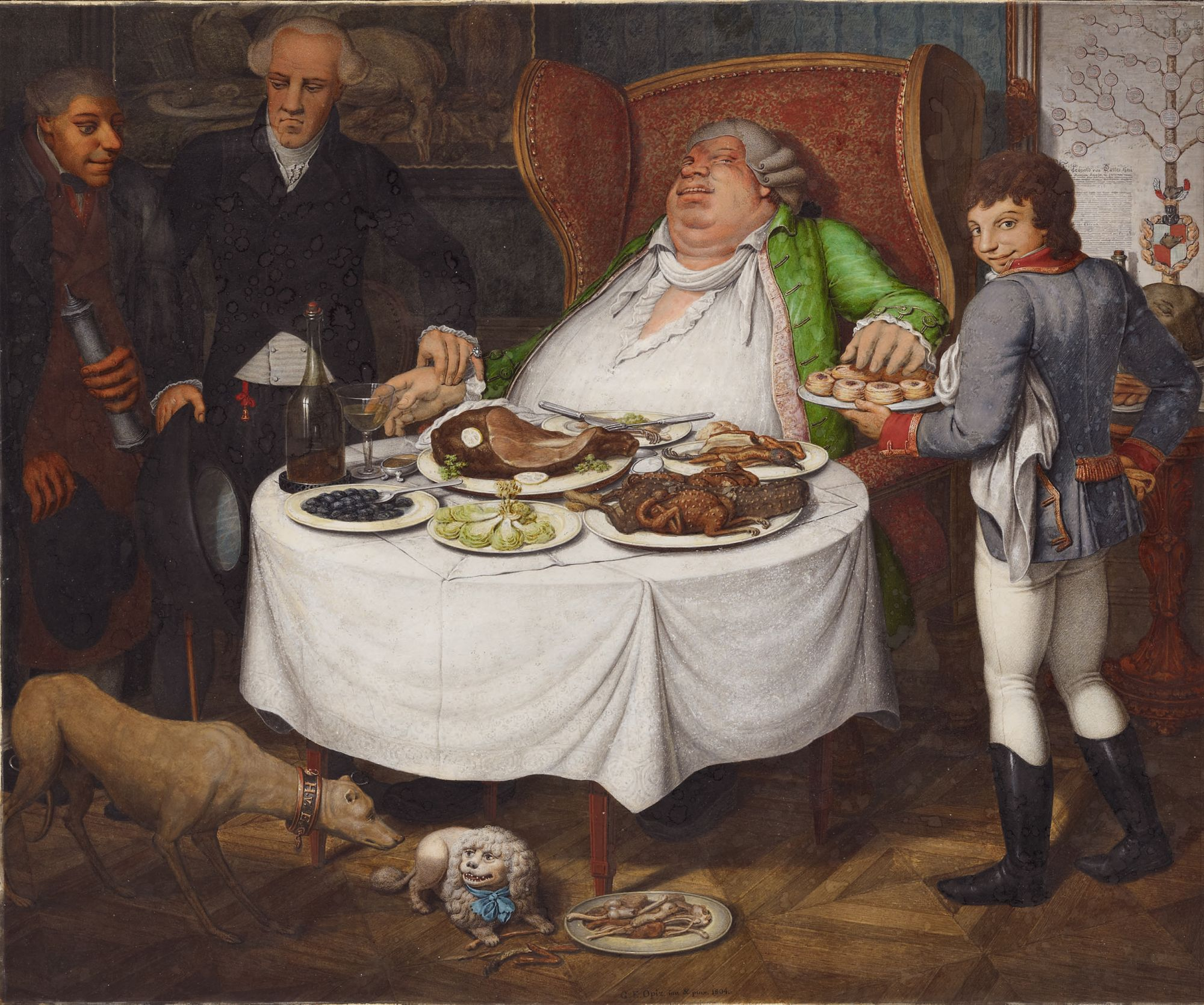
Der Völler by Georg Emmanuel Opiz

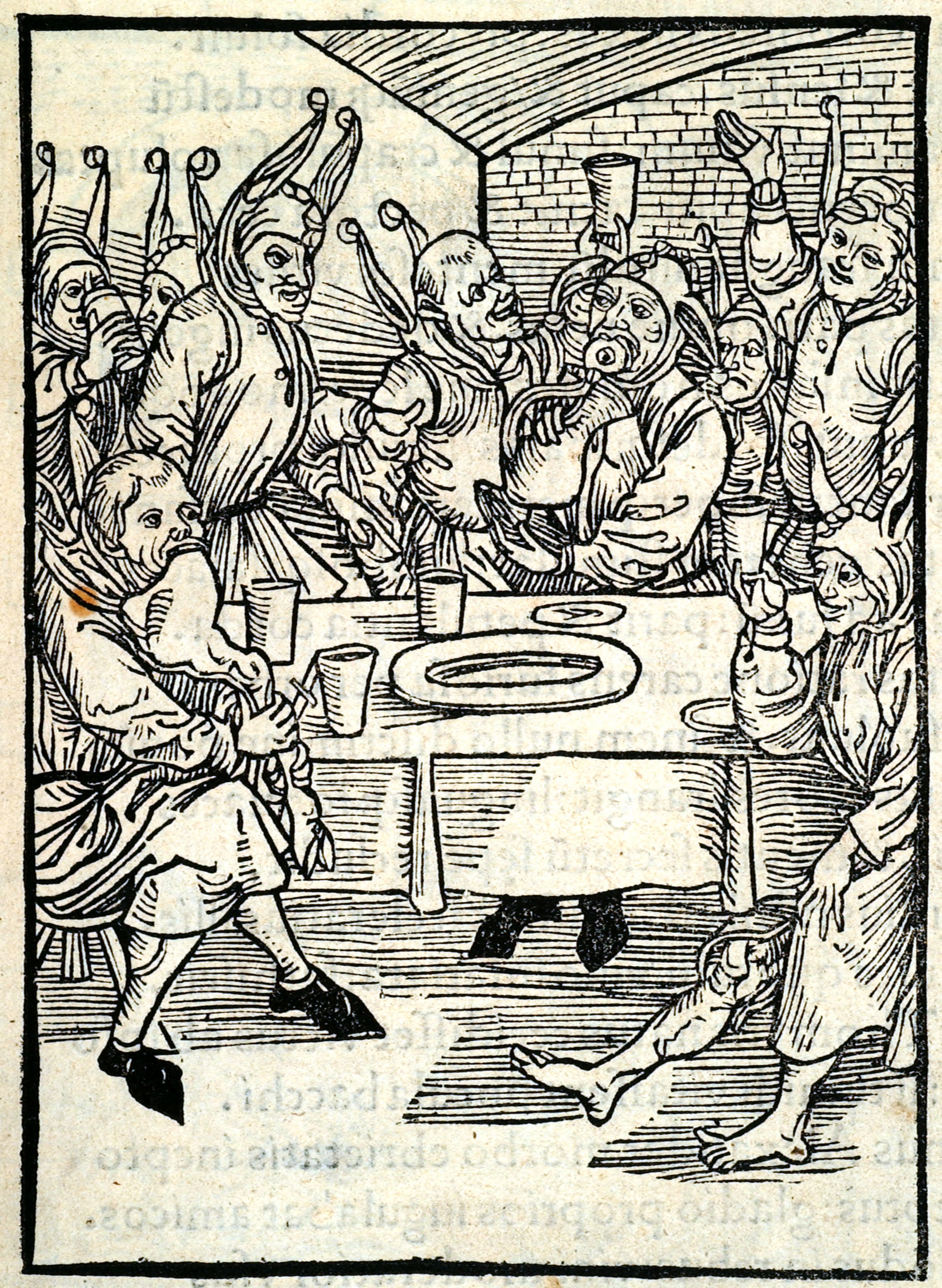
A woodcut representing gluttony

Gluttony (Latin: gula, derived from the Latin gluttire meaning 'to gulp down or swallow') means over-indulgence and over-consumption of anything to the point of waste.

In Christianity, it is considered a sin if the excessive desire for food leads to a lack of control over one's relation with food or harms the body. Some Christian denominations consider gluttony one of the seven deadly sins. The concept of gluttony also has a broader definition within Christianity, where it is categorized into five distinct traits.

== Etymology ==
In Deuteronomy 21:20 and Proverbs 23:21, it is זלל. The Gesenius Entry (lower left word) has indications of "squandering" and "profligacy" (waste).

In Matthew 11:19 and Luke 7:34, it is φαγος (phagos). The LSJ Entry is tiny, and only refers to one external source, Zenobius Paroemiographus 1.73. The word could mean merely 'an eater', since φαγω (phagō) means 'eat'.

== In religion ==
=== Judaism ===
Rambam, for example, prohibits excessive eating and drinking in Hilchot De'ot (e.g., halachot 1:4, 3:2, 5:1). The Chofetz Chaim (Yisrael Meir Kagan) prohibits gluttony on the basis of Leviticus 19:26, in Sefer Ha-Mitzvot Ha-Katzar (Prohibition #106).

=== Christianity ===
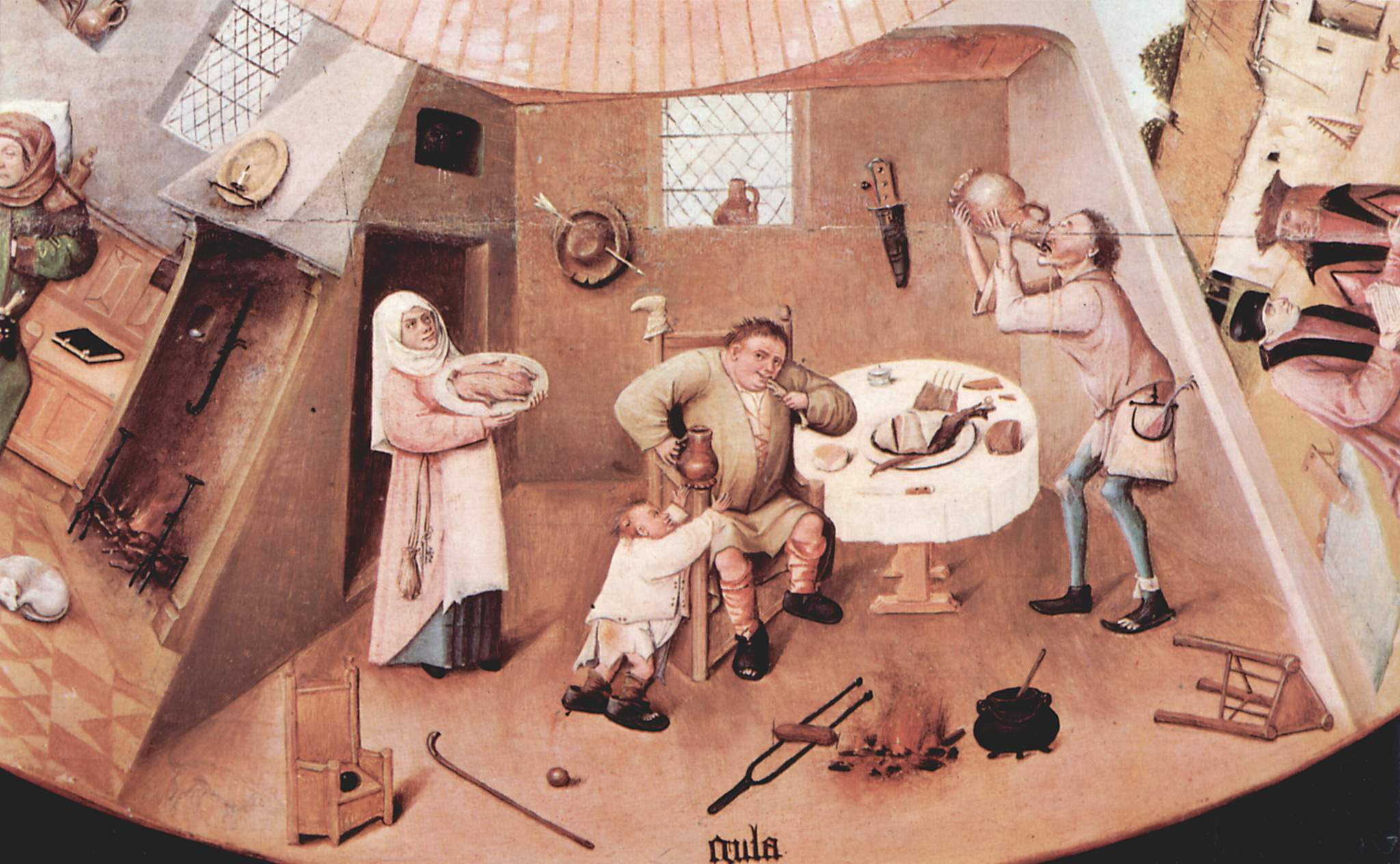
Gula – The Seven Deadly Sins and the Four Last Things, by Hieronymus Bosch

Church leaders from the ascetic Middle Ages took a more expansive view of gluttony:

==== St. Gregory the Great ====
Pope Gregory I (St. Gregory the Great), a doctor of the Church, described the following ways by which one can commit the sin of gluttony:

1. Eating before the time of meals in order to satisfy the palate.
2. Seeking delicacies and better quality of food to gratify the "vile sense of taste".
3. Seeking to stimulate the palate with overly or elaborately prepared food (e.g. with luxurious sauces and seasonings).
4. Exceeding the necessary quantity of food.
5. Taking food with too much eagerness, even when eating the proper amount, and even if the food is not luxurious.

This fifth way is worse than all others, said St. Gregory, because it shows attachment to pleasure most clearly. To recapitulate, St Gregory the Great said that one may succumb to the sin of gluttony by: 1. time (when); 2. quality; 3. stimulation; 4. quantity; 5. eagerness. He asserts that the irregular desire is the sin, not the food: "For it is not the food, but the desire that is in fault".

St. Gregory lists the daughter sins of gluttony as: Foolish mirth, uncleanness, babbling and dullness of the mind

==== St. Thomas Aquinas ====
In his Summa Theologica, St. Thomas Aquinas reiterated the list of five ways to commit gluttony:

- Laute – eating food that is too luxurious, exotic, or costly
- Studiose – eating food that is excessive in quality (too daintily or elaborately prepared)
- Nimis – eating food that is excessive in quantity (too much)
- Praepropere – eating hastily (too soon or at an inappropriate time)
- Ardenter – eating greedily (too eagerly)

St. Aquinas concludes that "gluttony denotes inordinate concupiscence in eating"; the first three ways are related to the food itself, while the last two related to the manner of eating. He says that abstinence from food and drink overcome the sin of gluttony, and the act of abstinence is fasting. (see: Fasting and abstinence in the Catholic Church) In general, fasting is useful to restrain concupiscence of the flesh.

==== St. Alphonsus Liguori ====
St. Alphonsus Liguori wrote the following when explaining gluttony:

Pope Innocent XI has condemned the proposition which asserts that it is not a sin to eat or to drink from the sole motive of satisfying the palate. However, it is not a fault to feel pleasure in eating: for it is, generally speaking, impossible to eat without experiencing the delight which food naturally produces. But it is a defect to eat, like beasts, through the sole motive of sensual gratification, and without any reasonable object. Hence, the most delicious meats may be eaten without sin, if the motive be good and worthy of a rational creature; and, in taking the coarsest food through attachment to pleasure, there may be a fault.

=== Islam ===
An interpretation of the meaning of a part of a Qur'anic verse is as follows:

and eat and drink but waste not by extravagance, certainly He (Allah) likes not Al‑Musrifoon (those who waste by extravagance)

— al-A’raaf 7:31

The Sunnah encourages moderation in eating, and strongly criticizes extravagance.

The Prophet said: The son of Adam does not fill any vessel worse than his stomach. It is sufficient for the son of Adam to eat a few mouthfuls, to keep him going. If he must do that (fill his stomach), then let him fill one third with food, one third with drink and one third with air.” Narrated by al-Tirmidhi (2380); classed as saheeh (truthful) by al-Albaani in al-Silsilah al-Saheehah (2265).

== In arts ==
Callimachus the famous Greek poet states, "All that I have given to my stomach has disappeared, and I have retained all the fodder that I gave to my spirit."

Popular quote "Eat to live, not live to eat" is commonly attributed to Socrates. A quotation from Rhetorica ad Herennium IV.28 : "Esse oportet ut vivas; non vivere ut edas" ('It is necessary to eat in order to live, not to live in order to eat') is credited by the Oxford Dictionary of Proverbs to Cicero.

== See also ==
- Food addiction
- Binge eating
- Edward Dando
- Bourgeoisie
- Mukbang
- Consumerism
