= Nicholas Perricone =

American doctor (born 1948)

Nicholas V. Perricone
- Born: June 23, 1948 (age 77) Branford, Connecticut, US
- Occupation: Dermatologist, author
- Education: Michigan State University College of Human Medicine, University of New Haven
- Subject: Health, weight loss, anti-aging, skin care
- Children: 3

Nicholas Perricone /ˈpɛrɪkoʊn/ is an American dermatologist and author. He has published self-help books about weight loss and maintaining the appearance of youth.

Perricone earned his medical degree from Michigan State University College of Human Medicine. He opposes the use of Botox. He argues that exercise, an anti-inflammatory diet plus dietary supplements, superfoods, and topical products can help fight aging and its effects on appearance. His company, N.V. Perricone, M.D. Ltd., sells branded products described in his books.

== Criticisms ==
According to PEERtrainer, his critics "accuse him of making crazy promises in order to sell product. His claims, it is argued, are backed by very little scientific research, and any research he has done himself has never been published in medical journals, where it would be subject to scrupulous review."

Harriet Hall and Stephen Barrett have written that Perricone's writings "contain many claims that are questionable, controversial, fanciful, unsupported by published evidence, or just plain wrong."
