= OJW =

OJW may refer to:

- Orthodontic jaw wiring
- Western Ojibwa language, also known as Nakawēmowin, Saulteaux, and Plains Ojibwa, ISO 639-3 language code ojw
