= Cheat food =

Cheat food may refer to:

- Junk food – a synonym from the early 20th century
- Any food not on a diet, especially a weight-loss diet
