= Overeating =

Consuming excessive food relative to energy expenditure

Overeating occurs when an individual consumes food past the point of satiation or consumes more calories than the energy that is expended via physical activity or expelled via excretion, often leading to weight gain and obesity. Overeating is the defining characteristic of binge eating disorder, and it can be a symptom of bulimia nervosa.

== Treatment ==
Cognitive behavioural therapy, individual therapy, and group therapy are often beneficial in helping people keep track of their eating habits and changing the way they cope with difficult situations. Often overeating and the related binge eating are related to dieting, body image issues, as well as social pressures.

There are several 12-step programs that helps overeaters, such as Overeaters Anonymous or Food Addicts in Recovery Anonymous and others. It is quite clear through research and various studies that overeating causes addictive behaviors.

In some instances, overeating has been linked to the use of medications known as dopamine agonists, such as pramipexole.

== See also ==
- Compulsive overeating
- Counterregulatory eating
- Behavioral addiction
- Binge eating
- Food drunk
- Gluttony
- Polyphagia
- Fasting
