= Lulu Hunt Peters =

American physician (1873–1930)

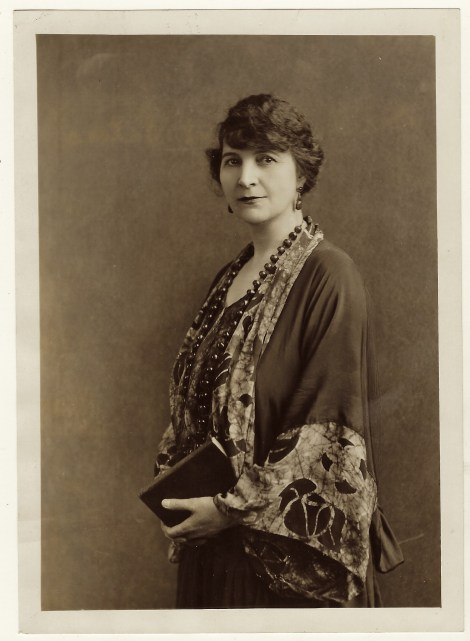
Lulu Hunt Peters

Lulu Hunt Peters (1873–1930) was an American physician and writer who wrote a featured newspaper column entitled Diet and Health, which she followed up with a best-selling book, Diet & Health: With Key to the Calories. She was the first person to widely popularize the concept of counting calories as a method of weight loss. It was also the first weight-loss book to become a bestseller.

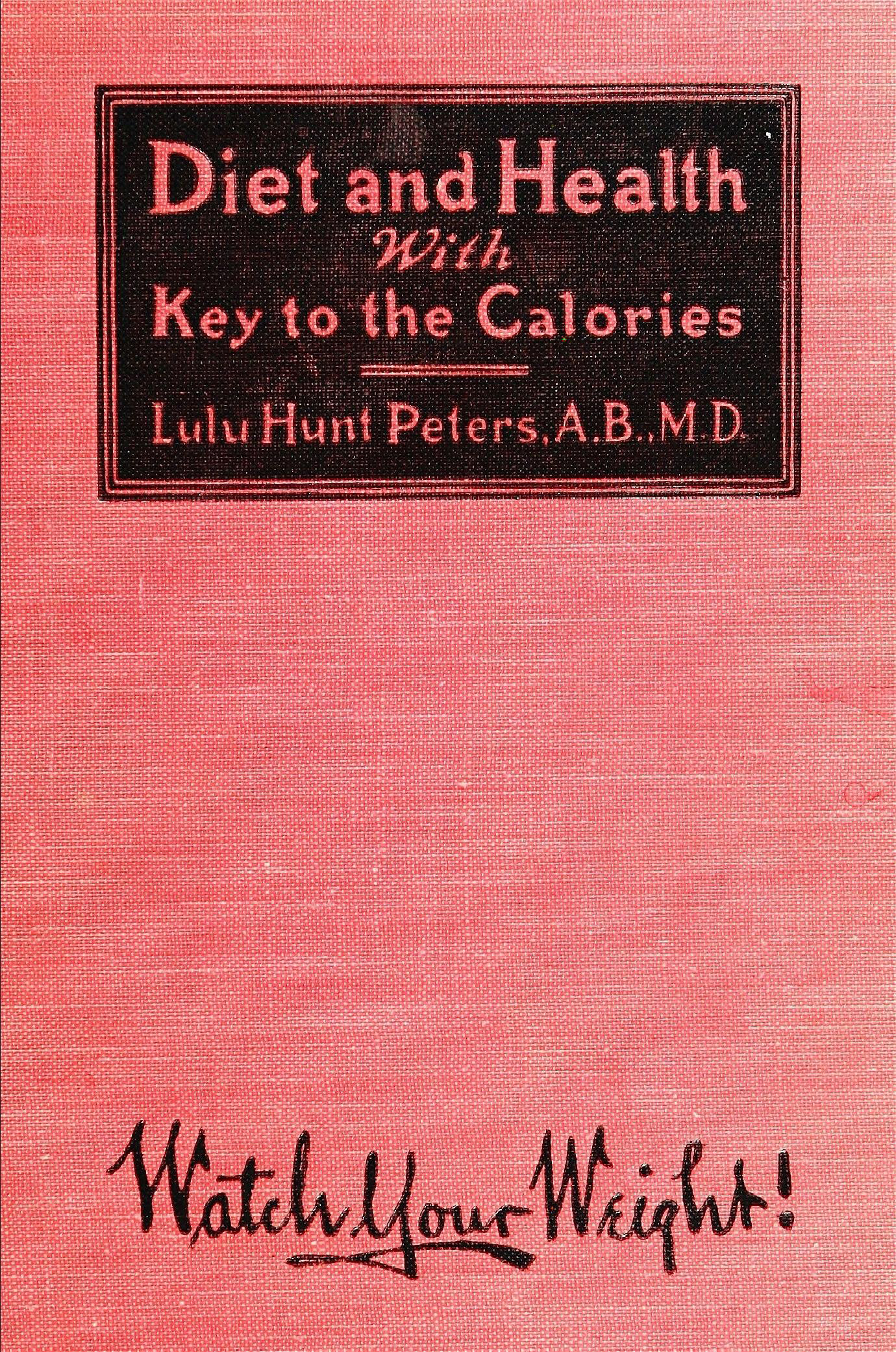
Diet and Health, Cover, 1918.

== Early life and education ==
Lulu E. Hunt was one of three children born to Thomas and Alice Hunt of Milford, Maine. She attended the Maine State Normal School in Castine before moving to California. She married Louis H. Peters in Los Angeles in 1899, and in 1909 graduated as a Doctor of Medicine from the University of California. At the time, less than 5% of medical students in the US were women.

== Career ==
Peters was the first woman to intern at Los Angeles County General Hospital, and led its pathology lab before becoming Chair of the Los Angeles California Federation of Women’s Clubs' public health committee — a role that gave her “more power than the entire city health office” according to a contemporaneous account. She gave frequent lectures about public health and child nutrition.

Nineteenth century scientists had begun to quantify the energy in food in calories, and Wilbur O. Atwater had developed new methods in the area and published the first books giving calorie counts for foods. At the time, this quantification was mostly regarded as a way to identify foods with high energy content to combat malnutrition; Peters appears to have been the first person to have recognized that using this information to intentionally reducing calorie intake would lead to weight loss. After losing 70 pounds herself, Peters began zealously promoting the concept. For a number of years, Dr. Hunt wrote a featured newspaper column entitled "Diet and Health" for the Central Press Association, which supplied content for about 400 newspapers nationwide.

In 1918, she published the diet book Diet & Health: With Key to the Calories, named after and based on her column and with illustrations by her nephew, Dawson Hunt Perkins (1907-1976), son of Henry Addison Perkins, Jr. and Anna Lydia Hunt. It presented the concept of calorie reduction as the best form of weight loss/watching weight to American women, who were wanting to conform to the new-found body image "thin is in". Along with presenting a solution for American women, Peters suggested that weight control was a way to support the troops from the homefront in the context of World War I food shortages. She suggested that dieting meant having complete self-control and recommended that women organize Watch Your Weight Anti-Kaiser Classes to obtain it. Peters followed her own advice/health regimens and credited them, along with her regular attendance at women's suffragist rallies, for her health and self-sufficiency.

Shortly after her book was published, Peters traveled to Bosnia, where she served with the Red Cross. When she returned to the United States, she was pleasantly surprised to learn that she was a best-selling author. She published a later edition describing her life after the book. Beginning in 1922, Peters became a radio lecturer, giving a series of talks about diet and health over station WJZ, then in Newark NJ. She continued to give radio health talks for the next several years. In addition, she was a popular public speaker, giving motivational talks all over the United States, including at facilities that specialized in weight loss. She also made informational pamphlets available to the readers of her syndicated columns; those who sent for these pamphlets received Peters's strategies for how to successfully lose weight.

In 1930, while on a trip by steamship to a medical conference in London, she became ill with neuralgia. She later died of pneumonia in late June 1930. She was survived by her former husband Louis H. Peters. Her book remains in circulation and is still quoted today.

== Diet and Health: With Key to the Calories ==
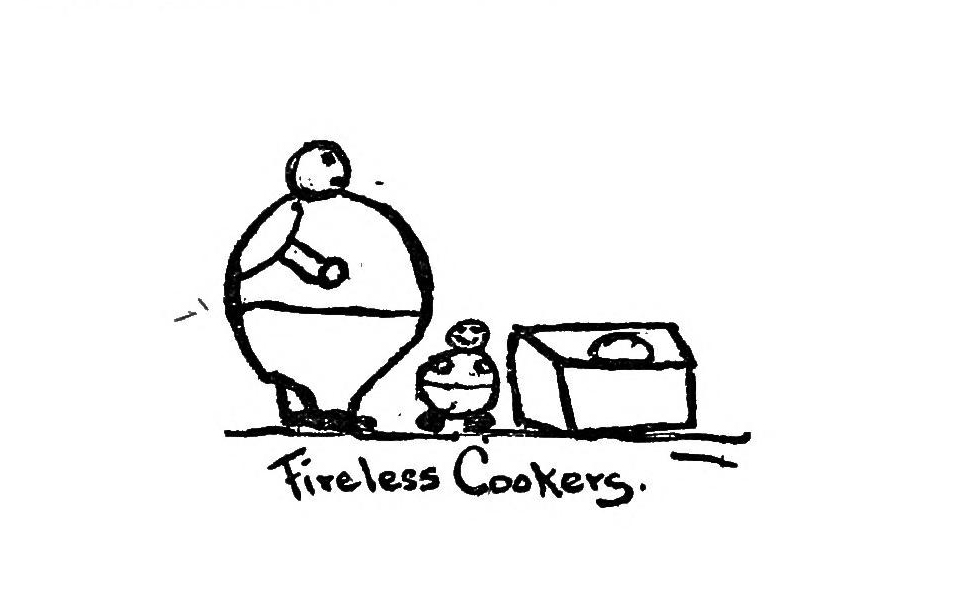
Human bodies as 'Fireless cookers' burning energy, Diet & Health, 1918

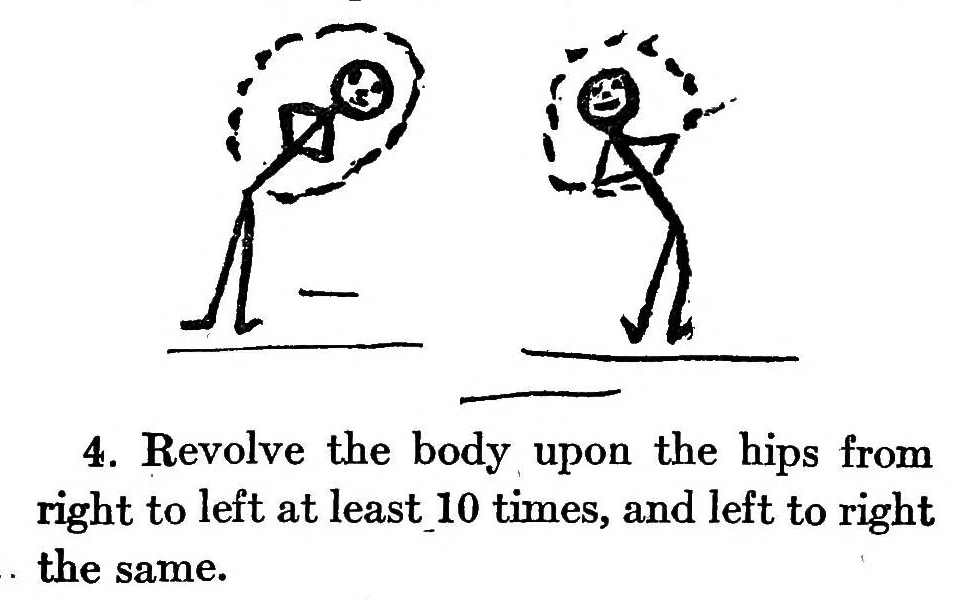
Suggestions for exercise, Diet & Health, 1918

Having grown up a hefty child and once weighing 220 lbs, she was extremely conscious of the problems weight presented to her. Peters's book Diet and Health: With Key to the Calories, targeted specifically to American women, became extremely popular, selling 2 million copies. People found it witty and entertaining. The book was the first dieting book to become a bestseller, and it remained in the top ten non-fiction bestselling books from 1922 to 1926, topping the list for two years running, in 1924 and 1925.

In the book, she explained the concept of the calorie as a scientific unit of measurement of the energy potentially available from food. The concept of the calorie was so new that her book even provides instruction on the word's pronunciation. She explains the importance of balancing food intake and energy used, and suggests a number of exercises, supported with simple cartoons.

She explains in her book that "hereafter you are going to eat calories of food. Instead of saying one slice of bread, or a piece of pie, you will say 100 calories of bread, 350 calories of pie". She shows women how to calculate their ideal weight with a formula. Her book included estimates of food portions that would contain 100 calories, based on research in a variety of technical publications that were not available to the general reader. She also indicates how many calories someone should eat per pound of ideal body weight, to keep the ideal weight that her system suggests (similar to body mass index). She paid less attention to issues of what sorts of foods a person should eat. Under her system, a person of Peters's height could eat whatever she wanted, as long as she maintained a strict diet of 1,200 calories a day. However, she warned against eating candy, because she thought that women who ate a little candy would binge on it.

In the 19th century and the beginnings of the 20th century, the main concern among nutrition experts was that people, especially poor laborers, were undernourished, and the main goal was to find inexpensive ways to supply enough food energy. Especially after World War One, the main concern among women, and the main concern for Peters, was being slender. Her book reinforced the message that the fashion industry (Vogue, Chanel, etc.) was implying through the design of their clothing: being fat was no longer in style. Peters presented a solution: counting calories as a way to lose weight. The book was written with the mindset that all women wanted to lose weight. According to Peters, who had lost 50-70 lbs with her diet regimen, dieting meant being beautiful and being in total control of the self. Being thin, to Peters, was an issue of self-esteem as well as physical health. She captivated her readers by letting them know that she knew the shame in being fat (having once weighed 200 lbs), and the sacrifice that dieting entailed, first hand. Beyond this, however, Peters saw dieting as having a moral dimension. She saw people who did not have control over their weight as morally suspect. In order to be thin, women must resist temptations, which she explains with the language of sin, punishment, and redemption.

She also mentions other reasons, beyond self-improvement, that made her diet even more appealing. During World War I, rationing was a regular part of daily life. Peters suggested that her diet would make dealing with rationing easier. For instance, she said that women who count their calories will be able to leave the left-over rations for children during the war. She stated, "that for every pang of hunger we feel we can have a double joy, that of knowing we are saving worse pangs in some little children, and that of knowing that for every pang we feel we lose a pound." The diet would also help prevent food shortages; by counting calories, women would be showing patriotism and improving themselves at the same time.

== See also ==
- Robert Hugh Rose
