= Counterregulatory eating =

Eating behaviour

Counterregulatory eating is the psychological tendency for a person to eat more after having recently consumed a large amount of food. This response is associated with a breakdown in cognitive control over eating behaviour and is considered the opposite of regulatory eating, which is the normal pattern of reducing food intake following a large meal. It is more common among dieters, for whom a large "preload", or the food eaten first, is presumed to sabotage motivation for restricted eating.

== Theories and studies ==
=== Set point theory ===
Set point theory of body weight regulation introduces the concept of a "set point" weight, which is the biologically preferred body weight unique to each individual. When weight is maintained below this set point, the body is in a state of caloric deficit and compensates by increasing energy intake or decreasing energy expenditure as a mechanism for regulating weight. This theory has been used to explain obesity, suggesting that obese individuals may develop increased sensitivity to external food cues, such as taste, in response to being below their natural set point weight. Heightened sensitivity to environmental food stimuli is associated with eating driven by external cues rather than internal signals of hunger or satiety, a behaviour characteristic of both obesity and counterregulatory eating.

=== Restraint theory ===
Despite its potential biological roots, counterregulatory eating in restrained eaters is largely exacerbated by cognitive factors. According to restraint theory, individuals who chronically restrict food intake are more susceptible to counterregulatory eating when their self-control is disrupted, which is most commonly caused by the perception that a dietary rule has been broken. Psychologist Janet Polivy later colloquially described this cognitive response as the "what-the-hell effect", reflecting an all-or-nothing approach to self-control. As long as dieters believe they are maintaining control, they tend to eat conservatively. However, when they perceive a loss of control over their diets, they experience a cognitive shift leading to counterregulatory eating, including episodes of overeating or even binge eating.

The what-the-hell effect in restrained eaters has been demonstrated in multiple experimental studies using the taste-test paradigm, a research method where participants consume a preload, after which they complete a taste-rating task of another food item, the intake of which is, often covertly, measured. In one study, participants who scored high on dietary restraint consumed significantly more ice cream after being given a milkshake labelled as "high calorie", compared to those given the same milkshake labelled as "low calorie", or no milkshake at all. This pattern was not observed in unrestrained participants, suggesting that the perception of dietary failure, rather than actual caloric needs, triggered the loss of control over food intake in restrained eaters.

Identifying as a dieter can thus make individuals more sensitive to the idea of dietary violation, which paradoxically lowers the criteria for breaking restraint. The cultural emphasis on dieting and thinness, which intensified since the mid-20th century, has further contributed to individuals adopting restrictive dietary rules to conform to socially reinforced ideals. As such, the stricter the dietary rules, the easier it becomes to feel that those rules have been violated, increasing the likelihood of counterregulatory eating. This creates a self-perpetuating cycle, where each perceived failure leads to counterregulatory eating, which in turn reinforces the belief that more restriction is necessary.

Notably, counterregulatory eating was only observed when the subsequent food was highly palatable, indicating that restrained eaters tend to eat more after a perceived high calorie preload, but only in specific contexts. Later research found that even after consuming an actually calorically dense preload, restrained eaters continued eating if the food was sufficiently appetising. One explanation is that because restrained eaters are assumed to be below their set point weight, they may be especially drawn to sweet or highly palatable foods. Counterregulatory eating therefore appears to be moderated by food palatability, which reflects its hedonic value. In Western cultures, where diets are typically rich in pleasurable foods, the constant availability of such options may override internal satiety cues, contributing to counterregulatory eating behaviour.

=== Psychosomatic theory ===
Research suggests that while negative emotions typically suppress appetite, some individuals exhibit increased food intake under emotional distress. The psychosomatic theory proposes that such "emotional eating" occurs in response to emotional arousal rather than physical hunger, which is especially frequent in individuals with diminished interoceptive awareness. One study testing this theory found that obese individuals prone to emotional eating engaged in counterregulatory eating when experiencing high levels of anxiety. This is because obese emotional eaters struggle to distinguish between hunger, satiety and other affective states, making them more likely to respond to negative emotions by eating more, regardless of previous food intake.

Importantly, other findings show that increased food consumption is not significantly linked to a reduction in negative emotions. In fact, eating more in response to stress has been shown to intensify emotional distress and induce feelings of guilt. Therefore, while emotional eating is often considered a coping mechanism, it may not effectively regulate negative emotions.

== Treatment ==
=== Behavioural and cognitive interventions ===
It has been observed that reducing the guilt of overeating through self-forgiveness can mitigate counterregulatory eating. However, many conventional diets impose rigid rules, such as eliminating specific foods or setting strict calorie limits per meal, which can inadvertently increase the likelihood of counterregulatory eating by creating more opportunities for individuals to feel that they have violated dietary restrictions. Therefore, more flexible dietary approaches, such as allowing small portions of a wide range of foods, can reduce the what-the-hell effect. Similarly, longitudinal calorie tracking, where individuals monitor intake weekly rather than daily, can promote more consistent self-regulation by allowing variation in calorie intake across days.

Studies also indicate that increasing self-awareness by asking individuals to record how much they eat can suppress counterregulatory eating in restrained eaters. Likewise, restrained individuals showed normal eating patterns, reducing food intake after a large preload, in the presence of others or while being observed, likely because social monitoring increases their self-consciousness, although these effects tend to be short-lived.

For longer-term change, techniques like cognitive restructuring can be applied to reduce dichotomous thinking in relation to eating, where food items are viewed as strictly "good" or "bad". This approach has proven successful in treating individuals with eating disorders using therapies, such as cognitive behavioural therapy (CBT). More recently, CBT has integrated mindfulness practices to facilitate intuitive eating, which means responding to internal cues of hunger and satiety. In one study, participants enrolled in a mindfulness-CBT group therapy programme reported that mindful eating gave them a stronger sense of control over their eating behaviours.
