= TOPS Club =

Organization

TOPS Club, Inc.
- Founded: 1948
- Founder: Esther S. Manz
- Type: Weight loss
- Location: Milwaukee, Wisconsin
- Region served: Worldwide, but primarily United States and Canada
- Members: 180,000 members/10,000 chapters
- Key people: Rick Danforth, President
- Website: www.tops.org

TOPS Club, Inc. is a non-profit charitable corporation based in Milwaukee, Wisconsin, United States, having members in chapters located worldwide, the majority of them in the United States and Canada. Its twofold objective is to sponsor research and foster support groups in human body weight control. Most members refer to the organization simply as "TOPS", an acronym for "Take Off Pounds Sensibly."

== Weight control philosophy ==
TOPS originally formed in 1948 as a response to the need to assist overweight and obese people to lose weight by setting up a support group system. Over the years as more weight management problems were identified, TOPS expanded its scope to include all people with weight problems. They also created an incentive for club members who reach and maintain their weight at their goal level to stay in the club as KOPS (Keeps Off Pounds Sensibly) members—giving them extra recognition to help encourage other members in the club.

TOPS does not endorse any particular weight-loss plan (see dieting) and welcomes people into the membership even if they are actively involved in another weight-loss group. Club meetings emphasize nutrition, exercise, motivation, behavior modification and wellness education focused on supplementing a member's effort to manage his or her weight. Real Life: A Hands-On Pounds Off Guide coauthor be leaders in these fields is provided free to all chapters. TOPS publishes educational materials for its members as well as a bimonthly membership magazine, TOPS News.

== Local chapter meetings ==
A local chapter of the club is set up in a small region, usually covering one community. Larger communities may have more than one chapter, either because of size limitations or to address the various schedules of their members. According to their website, the average chapter has 20 members. The total membership as of 2017 is almost 120,000 in the US and Canada. Only 4 people are needed to start a meeting in their community.

Members meet weekly both for weight recording ("weigh-in") and for the main session. The weigh-in is performed in a private room with two members present as recording officers. As such, the weight records are considered medically sound.

Members are required to consult with their health care professional for a written goal weight for themselves. This goal is turned in to the recorders. The first-year membership fee is $70 in the USA and $70USD in Canada plus local expense-covering dues averaging $5 monthly. Renewals and family members are less.

The main session in a chapter meeting is usually one of two types: education or special recognition. In either case, the meeting begins with a report of total losses or gains, in pounds, for the week, as tabulated from the just-completed weight recording. Individual members are recognized for such things as losing the most pounds in one week among all the members. Small prizes are awarded to these "losers" (the word used within the confines of TOPS instead of "winners"). These prizes are funded from the weekly dues (one to two dollars) collected from the members. Special recognition involves more elaborate award ceremonies for "losers" based on several criteria such as most pounds lost in a month or year, best overall improvement, steady "losers," and maintaining goal-weight for a KOPS (Keep Off Pounds Sensibly).

== Online chapter meetings ==
Three online weekly meetings are available for members who have no local or convenient chapter meeting or who prefer an online experience, including international members living outside of the USA and Canada. Unlike members of local meetings, there is no weigh-in for online meeting members.

== International Recognition Days ==
The most successful male and female members reaching their goal weights in the current year (KOPS) from each state and province are recognized as Kings and Queens at regional events each spring. They are then invited to attend International Recognition Days, a two-day convention that is held each summer in a different U.S. or Canadian city. A highlight of IRD is the crowning of the International King and Queen and Runners-up. The winners are chosen according to which Kings and Queens lost the most total weight to reach the weight-loss goal set by their health care professionals. The International King and Queen are often chosen for losing 200 pounds or more.

IRD is also an opportunity for education and inspiration. TOPS features several health and fitness experts as well as motivational speakers throughout IRD.

== Medical research ==
TOPS Club, Inc. has been actively involved in the clinical study of obesity and metabolic research since 1966 and has contributed almost $9 million to the Medical College of Wisconsin in support of these efforts. The TOPS Obesity and Metabolic Research Center at the Medical College of Wisconsin in Milwaukee, Wisconsin, was established in 1994. It also supports the efforts of the TOPS Genome Registry at Wake Forest University in Winston-Salem, NC, under the direction of Michael Olivier, Ph.D. TOPS sponsors research awards presented annually through the Obesity Society and scholarships and a research award in alternating years through Obesity Canada.

Work done at the TOPS Obesity and Metabolic Research Center has contributed to milestones of obesity research, including:

• The paper entitled “Biology of Regional Body Fat Distribution: Relationship of to non-insulin-dependent diabetes mellitus”. Findings in this study led to the terms “apple-shaped” vs. “pear-shaped” for android obesity and gynoid obesity, which are adipose tissue distributions that were at the time more typical of men and women (respectively), with the latter being more metabolically benign than the former. • Identification of a gene that plays a significant role in determining blood levels of HDL cholesterol.

More than 500 TOPS families participated as research volunteers in those studies, making them among the largest family studies conducted in the United States. Findings have been published in over 200 of the most reputable scientific papers including The Journal of the American Medical Association (JAMA) and Nature Genetics.

The journal Obesity published the study "Determining the Effectiveness of Take Off Pounds Sensibly (TOPS), a Nationally Available Nonprofit Weight Loss Program", which found those who spent three years in TOPS lost five to seven percent of their body weight and kept it off.

TOPS also supports and encourages obesity research through The Obesity Society and Obesity Canada, and partners with many nonprofit and governmental initiatives to combat obesity, including former First Lady Michelle Obama's "Let's Move!" campaign.

TOPS partners with Dr. Rena Wing, Ph.D., and the Weight Control and Diabetes Research Center affiliated with Brown Medical School, where TOPS members are the subjects in a study of "Successful Weight Losers." TOPS members also participate in the National Weight Loss Registry, which is also sponsored by the Brown Medical School.

TOPS partnered in the "Bias, Discrimination and Obesity" study co-authored by Dr. Rebecca Puhl, Ph.D. and Dr. Kelly Brownell, Ph.D. of Yale University.

TOPS meets with healthcare professionals at a variety of national conferences throughout the year (such as The Obesity Society, American Dietetic Association Food & Nutrition Conference, and the American Association of Diabetes Educators). The organization also established the TOPS Achievement Award for scientists who have made major contributions to the field of obesity research in affiliation with The Obesity Society.

== See also ==
- American Dietetic Association
- Overeaters Anonymous
- The Obesity Society
- Food Addicts in Recovery Anonymous
