= Mayo Clinic Diet =

1949 diet book

The Mayo Clinic Diet is a diet book first published in 1949 by the Mayo Clinic's committee on dietetics as the Mayo Clinic Diet Manual. The book is now published as The Mayo Clinic Diet (ISBN 978-1945564000) with a companion logbook, The Mayo Clinic Diet Journal (ISBN 978-1945564017).

The diet begins with a two-week period where five specific bad habits are replaced by five specific good habits. According to the authors this should result in a 6- to 10-pound (2.5- to 4.5-kilogram) weight loss during that 2-week period. The remainder of the program is based in large part on a combination of portion control and physical activity. This part of the program is designed to allow the safe loss of one to two pounds per week, or 50 to 100 pounds (22 to 45 kilograms) over the course of a year.

The program uses a food pyramid that has vegetables and fruits as its base. It puts carbohydrates, meat and dairy, fats, and sweets into progressively more limited daily allowances. The diet emphasizes setting realistic goals, replacing poor health habits with good ones, and conscious portion control.

== Five bad habits ==
- Added sugar
- Snacks other than fruits and vegetables
- Overlarge servings of meat or dairy products
- Eating restaurant meals that don't follow the diet
- Watching television while eating

== History and Development ==
The Mayo Clinic Diet was developed by the Mayo Clinic as part of its patient education and preventive health initiatives. Early dietary guidance associated with the institution emphasized balanced nutrition, portion control, and lifestyle-based weight management rather than short-term dieting.

The term “Mayo diet” was historically used in popular media to describe a variety of unrelated fad diets, including the grapefruit diet, which were not affiliated with the Mayo Clinic. The organization has stated that such diets are misattributed and do not reflect its medical recommendations.

The modern program was introduced in 2010 with the publication of The Mayo Clinic Diet, developed by a team of physicians and nutrition experts including Donald D. Hensrud. It was designed as a structured approach to weight management emphasizing long-term behavioral change and healthy eating patterns.

Later editions and updates expanded the program to include digital tools and personalized plans, evolving into a subscription-based platform. Its core approach—gradual weight loss through lifestyle modification—has remained consistent.

== Diets falsely called "Mayo Diet" ==
The legitimate Mayo Clinic Diet does not promote a high protein or "key food" approach. There have been diets falsely attributed to Mayo Clinic for decades. Many or most web sites claiming to debunk the bogus version of the diet are actually promoting it or a similar fad diet. The Mayo Clinic website appears to no longer acknowledge the existence of the false versions and prefers to promote their own researched diet.

== See also ==
- Diet (nutrition)
- Dieting
- Digestion
- List of diets
