= Overeaters Anonymous =

Twelve-step program

Overeaters Anonymous (OA) is a twelve-step program founded by Rozanne S. Its first meeting was held in Hollywood, California, USA on January 19, 1960, after Rozanne attended a Gamblers Anonymous meeting and realized that the Twelve Steps could potentially help her with her own addictive behaviors relating to food. OA has since grown, with groups in over 75 countries meeting in person, over the phone, and through the internet. OA is for people with problems related to food including, but not limited to, compulsive overeaters, those with binge eating disorder, bulimics and anorexics. Anyone with a problematic relationship with food is welcomed; OA's Third Tradition states that the only requirement for memberships is a desire to stop eating compulsively.

OA's headquarters, or World Service Office, is located in Rio Rancho, New Mexico. Overeaters Anonymous estimates its membership at over 60,000 people in about 6,500 groups meeting in over 75 countries. OA has developed its own literature specifically for those who eat compulsively but also uses the Alcoholics Anonymous books Alcoholics Anonymous and Twelve Steps and Twelve Traditions. The First Step of OA begins with the admission of powerlessness over food; the next eleven steps are intended to bring members "physical, emotional, and spiritual healing."

== Definitions ==
OA defines compulsions as "any impulse or feeling of being irresistibly driven toward the performance of some irrational action." OA further defines compulsive overeating as a progressive, addictive illness. OA views compulsive overeating as a chronic condition and part of an attempt to alleviate psychological stress.

Like other twelve-step programs, OA sees compulsive eating as a threefold illness, symbolically understanding human structure as having three dimensions: physical, mental and spiritual. Compulsive eating manifests itself in each dimension. A book describing itself as based on OA methods states that in the mental dimension a compulsive eater is not "eating down" feelings, but rather expressing an "inner hunger."

To help potential members decide whether or not they need the program, OA provides a questionnaire, asking questions such as, "Do you give too much time and thought to food?" Answering "yes" to three or more of these questions is considered a good indication of problems with which OA may be able to assist.

=== Abstinence in OA ===
“Abstinence in Overeaters Anonymous is the action of refraining from compulsive eating and compulsive food behaviors while working towards or maintaining a healthy body weight.” This concept of abstinence has been criticized for its lack of specificity. While in AA abstinence means not drinking alcohol, some argue that it is not possible to set out specific foods, because OA's experience is that different people have different food triggers (i.e. foods and food behaviors that cause them to eat compulsively). While it is often said that alcoholics don't have to drink, but compulsive eaters still have to eat, Overeaters Anonymous responds by pointing out that alcoholics do have to drink, but cannot drink alcohol, just as compulsive eaters do have to eat, but cannot eat foods which cause compulsive eating.

OA literature specifically defines "compulsion" as follows: "By definition, 'compulsion' means 'an impulse or feeling of being irresistibly driven toward the performance of some irrational action.'" Therefore, "compulsive eating" and "compulsive food behaviors" (as those terms are used in OA's definition of abstinence) mean irrational eating, or irrational food behaviors, taken as a result of an impulse or feeling that feels irresistible. So, according to Overeaters Anonymous, "abstinence" is the act of refraining from "compulsive eating" and "compulsive food behaviors," while working towards or maintaining a healthy body weight. While this definition can fairly be described as nuanced and subject to personal interpretation (e.g., the definition of a "healthy body weight"), or requiring self-searching analysis (e.g., to determine the drivers of certain behaviors), it is not unspecific.

The objective of OA's definition of abstinence is that the compulsive eater refrain not from eating, but rather, from compulsive eating and compulsive food behaviors, and work towards or maintain a healthy body weight. Thus, OA calls for the compulsive eater to define his or her own plan of eating which enables the compulsive eater to abstain from compulsive eating and compulsive food behaviors, while working towards or maintaining a healthy body weight.

The program suggests that members identify the foods that "trigger" overeating. Since individuals are responsible for defining their own plan of eating, they are able to change their plan of eating if their needs and understanding of their compulsions change, without that change constituting a breach of abstinence. Members are encouraged to seek counsel with other individuals before making such changes, generally including a member or members of the OA fellowship, to validate that the reasons are sound and not unwittingly a decision based on underlying compulsion.

== Recovery tools and strategies ==
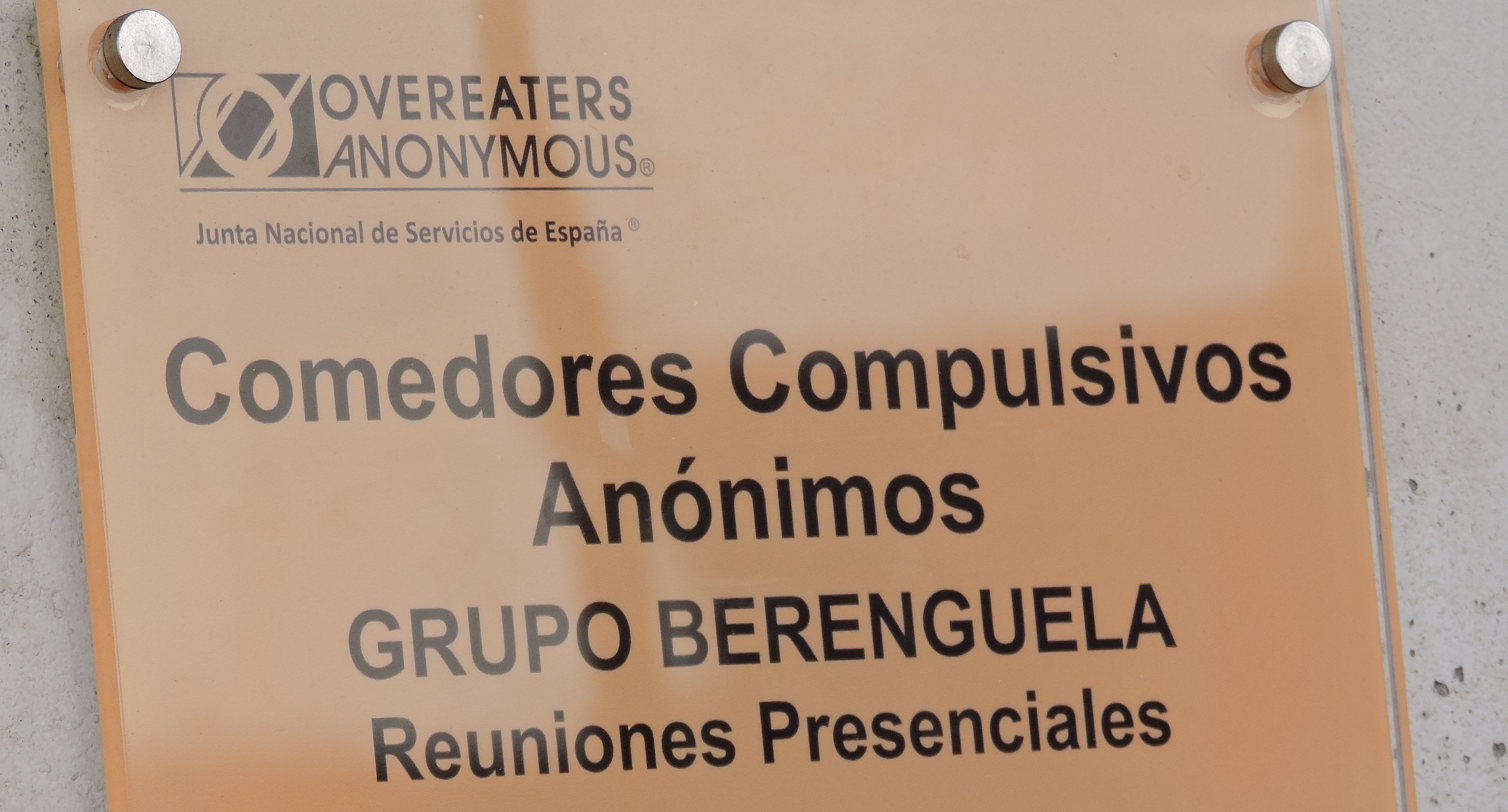
Comedores Compulsivos Anónimos (Overeaters Anonymous) group in Santiago de Compostela (Spain)

The OA program is based on the twelve steps and twelve traditions of Alcoholics Anonymous. Small changes have been made to make these applicable to eating disorders, but such adaptation has been minimal. To take the twelve steps and practice the twelve traditions, OA program literature recommends using nine "Tools of Recovery." These are A Plan of Eating, Sponsorship, Meetings, the Telephone, Writing, Literature, an Action Plan, Anonymity and Service. These tools are considered critical to obtaining and maintaining abstinence.

Meetings offer a consensual validation and serve to diminish feelings of guilt and shame. A sponsor provides guidance through the OA program and support where necessary, but gradually encourages autonomy in the sponsee. A sponsor strives to make his or her job obsolete.

=== Food plans ===
In Overeaters Anonymous, abstinence is "the action of refraining from compulsive eating while working towards or maintaining a healthy body weight." According to OA, "by definition, 'compulsion' means 'an impulse or feeling of being irresistibly driven toward the performance of some irrational action.'" OA has a long and complex history with "food plans" and does not endorse or recommend any specific plan of eating, nor does it exclude the personal use of one. OA recommends that each member consult a qualified health care professional, such as a physician or dietitian. OA publishes a pamphlet, Dignity of Choice, which assists in the design of an individual food plan and also provides six sample plans of eating (reviewed and approved by a licensed dietitian) with which some OA members have had success.

Individual OA meetings and sponsors may make more detailed suggestions. Some of these caution against foods containing excessive sugar, caffeine and white flour. A qualitative analysis of bulimics recovering in OA found bulimic OA members with excessively rigid plans are less likely to remain abstinent. The researchers conducting the analysis suggested that new members begin with a somewhat rigid plan which becomes increasingly flexible by the end of a year in the program.

An individual's plan of eating may call for the exclusion of certain triggering behaviors. For example, a person who knows that eating after a certain time in the evening triggers compulsive food behavior might include in their plan of eating a commitment to abstain from eating after that time of night; a person who knows that snacking between meals triggers compulsive food behavior would probably include in their plan of eating a commitment to abstain from chewing (or sucking) between meals.

== Demographics ==
In 2002, a dissertation compared the results of a survey of 231 OA members in the Washington, DC area of North America undertaken in 2001 with the findings from surveys of OA members taken in 1981, twenty years previously. The 2001 survey showed that 84% of OA members identified as binge eaters, 15% as bulimic, and 1% as anorexic. The 1981 survey had found that 44.5% of OA members identified as binge eaters, 40.7% as bulimic, and 14.8% as anorexic. The survey also found an increase in the percentage of males in OA from 9% in 1981 to 16% in 2001. Both figures are generally in line with estimates made by the American Psychological Association that the male to female ratio of those with eating disorders ranges from 1:6 to 1:10. The researcher stated that the typical OA member in Washington was white and highly educated. The typical OA member surveyed in 2001 worked in a full-time capacity and homemakers only comprised 6% of the 2001 OA population, in contrast to 30% of those surveyed in 1981. This reflects the trend for increasing numbers of females to be employed outside of the home. Further, 80% of the 2001 participants had attained a college degree, compared to 59% of those surveyed in 1981. The percentage of OA members who were divorced or separated had risen from 10% in 1981 to 21% in 2001, also reflecting trends amongst the general population.

== Correlations with maintaining abstinence ==
Research has identified a number of OA practices significantly correlating with maintaining abstinence in OA: adherence to a food plan (including weighing and measuring food), communication with other members (specifically sponsors), spending time in prayer and meditation, performing service work, completing the fourth step, completing the ninth step, writing down thoughts and feelings, attending meetings, reading OA/AA literature, and the educational status of the participant. Researchers have therefore concluded that application of OA practices might directly help promote abstinence and reduce the frequency of relapse in those with binge eating disorder and bulimia nervosa.

=== Honesty ===
Though not found in research to be significant, a number of OA members responded that honesty was a very important OA practice. Researchers have noted the high level of honesty at OA meetings and pointed out that working the Twelve Steps reinforces this quality.

=== Spirituality ===
Some researchers have found that in spite of its perceived high importance to the program spirituality does not correlate with measures of weight loss; others have found somewhat contradictory conclusions. In particular, an increased sense of spirituality was correlated with improvement in eating attitudes, fewer body shape concerns, and better psychological and social functioning. However, measures of religiosity and particular religious affiliations have never been found to correlate with treatment outcomes. Perhaps because spirituality and religion are two different things.

=== Demographic abstinence differences ===
Some research has found the average length of abstinence for bulimics in OA was significantly higher than the average length for binge eaters. Paradoxically, bulimics were also found to attend fewer meetings and had less of a commitment to write their thoughts and feelings down daily. However, the frequency of relapse for bulimics and binge eaters was not significantly different. The differences may be explained by the predictable nature of the bulimic cycle. Other research has found binge eaters in OA had better success than bulimics. Most OA members who have reported negative experiences in the program are anorexic. This could be caused by OA's focus on problems of eating too much rather than too little. Some OA practices, such as refraining from eating certain kinds of foods, are antithetical in the case of anorexics.

== Results ==
The average weight loss of participants in OA has been found to be 21.8 pounds (9.9 kg). Survey results show that 90 percent of OA has responded that they have improved "somewhat, much, or very much" in their emotional, spiritual, career and social lives. OA's emphasis on group commitment and psychological and spiritual development provided a framework for developing positive, adaptive and self-nurturing treatment opportunities.

=== Changes in worldview ===
Changes in worldview are considered critical for individuals in the recovery process, as they are generally accompanied by significant behavioral changes. Accordingly, several researchers have identified worldview transformation in members of various self-help groups dealing with addiction issues. Such research describes "worldview" as four domains: experience of self, universal order (God), relationships with others and perception of the problem. In OA, members changed their beliefs that "it is bad to eat" to "one must eat to stay alive and should not feel guilty about it"; "one is simply overweight and needs to lose pounds" to "one has underlying psychological and interpersonal problems"; "one must deprecate oneself, deprive oneself, please other people" to "it is okay to express positive feelings about oneself and take care of one's needs"; "food is the answer to all problems, the source of solace" to "psychological and emotional needs should be fulfilled in relationships with people"; "I am a person who eats uncontrollably" to "I am someone who has limitations and does not eat what is harmful for me."

=== Understanding of control ===
The act of binging and purging provides bulimics with the illusion that they can regain a sense of control. Binge eating has been described as a "futile attempt to restock depleted emotional stores, when attempts at doing everything perfectly have failed." The self-destructive behavior of injecting intoxicating drugs parallels overeating; it permits the user to experience comfort, and to feel punished afterwards.

In relationships, many OA members attested to trying to control their own lives and those of others. Paradoxically, an OA member's experience of themselves was also characterized by strong feelings of personal failure, dependence, despair, stress, nervousness, low self-esteem, powerlessness, lack of control, self-pity, frustration and loneliness. As part of these feelings, the self was perceived as being both a victim of circumstances and a victim of the attitude of others. Many members viewed this lack of self-esteem as deriving from their external appearance. Harsh self-criticism is a typical characteristic, accompanied by feelings of "I don't deserve it" and "I'm worth less than others." Such feelings were found to have a dominant influence on relationships with others.

Members describe their sense of relaxation and liberation, and the increasing value of restraint and modesty in their lives. Their testimonies show that, paradoxically, it is by becoming aware of their powerlessness and accepting the self's basic limitations that they begin to feel the recovering self's growing power. At the same time, personal responsibility replaces self-pity and the expectation that others will act for the good of the individual. With these old attitudes, egocentricity and exaggerated, false self-confidence perpetuate the problem which led them to join OA. While their eating disorder was active, many OA members claimed that their experience of self was composed of an obsessive aspiration for perfection which concealed their sense of worthlessness.

== Comparisons ==
A significant difference between Twelve Step work and cognitive-behavioral therapy is the acceptance of a Higher Power and providing peer support. A large study, known as Project Match, compared the two approaches as well as motivational enhancement therapy in treating alcoholics. The Twelve Step programs were found to be more effective in promoting abstinence. However, some researchers have found that cognitive-behavioral therapy is the most effective treatment for bulimics. The two approaches are not mutually exclusive.

OA is most appropriate for patients who need intensive emotional support in losing weight. Each OA group has its own character and prospective members should be encouraged to sample several groups.

== Criticism ==
OA differs from group therapy in not allowing its participants to express their feelings about (and to) each other during meetings. OA meetings are intended to provide a forum for the expression of experience, strength and hope in an environment of safety and simplicity.

=== Feminist criticism ===
OA has been an object of feminist criticism for encouraging bulimic and binge-eating women to accept powerlessness over food. Feminists assert that the perception of powerlessness adversely affects women's struggle for empowerment; teaching people they are powerless encourages passivity and prevents binge eaters and bulimics from developing coping skills. These effects would be most devastating for women who have experienced oppression, distress and self-hatred. Twelve-step programs are described as predominantly male organizations that force female members to accept self-abasement, powerlessness and external focus, and reject responsibility. Surrender is described as women passively submitting their lives to male doctors, teachers and ministers; the feminist view suggests that women focus on pride instead of humility.

OA contends that the context of powerlessness within the program isn't referring to an individual's flaws, but simply with the acceptance that they have a problem with food that they cannot seem to defeat with their unaided will. The slogan "We are powerless, not helpless," is an example of this distinction. By accepting that they are powerless over certain things and thereby surrendering the illusion of control, they are then able to make an honest appraisal and make clearer decisions about what they truly do control.

=== Possible fanaticism ===
Opponents of Twelve Step programs argue that members become cult-like in their adherence to the program, which can have a destructive influence, isolating those in the programs. Moreover, this kind of fanaticism may lead to perception that other treatment modalities are unnecessary. Surveys of OA members have found that they exercise regularly, attend religious services, engage in individual psychotherapy and are being prescribed antidepressants. This is evidence that participants do not avoid other useful therapeutic interventions outside of Twelve Step programs.

== Literature ==
OA also publishes the book Overeaters Anonymous (referred to as the "Brown Book"), The Twelve Steps and Twelve Traditions of Overeaters Anonymous, For Today (a book of daily meditations), the OA Journal for Recovery, a monthly periodical known as Lifeline, and several other books. The following list is not comprehensive.

- Overeaters Anonymous (January 2001). Overeaters Anonymous. Torrance, California: Overeaters Anonymous, Incorporated. ISBN 1-889681-02-4. OCLC 47722165.
- Overeaters Anonymous (October 1993). The Twelve Steps and Twelve Traditions of Overeaters Anonymous. Torrance, California: Overeaters Anonymous. ISBN 0-9609898-6-2. OCLC 30004811.
- Overeaters Anonymous (1995). Journal to Recovery (Overeaters Anonymous). Overeaters Anonymous, Incorporated. ISBN 0-9609898-8-9.
- Overeaters Anonymous (October 1994). Abstinence: Members of Overeaters Anonymous Share Their Experience, Strength, and Hope. Rio Rancho, New Mexico: Overeaters Anonymous. ISBN 0-9609898-7-0. OCLC 32666911.
- Overeaters Anonymous (April 1993). The Twelve-Step Workbook of Overeaters Anonymous. Torrance, California: Overeaters Anonymous. ISBN 0-9609898-5-4. OCLC 30170467.
- Overeaters Anonymous (October 1990). Twelve Steps of Overeaters Anonymous. Torrance, California: Overeaters Anonymous. ISBN 0-9609898-3-8. OCLC 22811051.
- Overeaters Anonymous (1998). A New Beginning: Stories of Recovery from Relapse. Rio Rancho, New Mexico: Overeaters Anonymous. ISBN 1-889681-01-6. OCLC 40664593.

== See also ==
- List of twelve-step groups
- TOPS Club, Inc.
- Food Addicts in Recovery Anonymous
- Food Addicts Anonymous
