= National Weight Control Registry =

Weight loss research study

The National Weight Control Registry is an American research study that includes people (18 years or older) who have lost at least 13.6 kg (30 lbs) of weight and kept it off for at least one year. There are currently over 10,000 members enrolled in the study, making it perhaps the largest study of weight loss ever conducted. Members complete annual questionnaires about their current weight, diet and exercise habits, and behavioral strategies for weight loss maintenance.

The National Weight Control Registry is coordinated through the Miriam Hospital's "Weight Control and Diabetes Research Center" in Providence, Rhode Island. It was founded and is currently overseen by Dr. Rena Wing at Brown University and Dr. James Hill at University of Colorado.

== Demographics ==
The registry is composed of approximately 80% women. The “average” female participant is 45 years old and currently 145 pounds while the average man is 49 years old and 190 pounds. On average, registry members have lost about 70 pounds and kept it off for five and a half years when joining the registry. However, within the study there is great variation in age, weight loss speed and duration, and amount of weight lost.

== Research findings ==
The research has shown that members lost weight by a wide variety of methods. However, 98% of people modified their food intake and 94% of participants increased their exercise. After losing weight, almost all of the registry members ate breakfast and weighed themselves regularly, most commonly once per week. About 45% of registry participants lost weight on their own, while 55% of participants obtained help from some type of program. Registry participants watch less television than the average American, which leaves time to engage in about 60 minutes per day of moderate intensity physical activity, or the equivalent.

Research findings from the National Weight Control Registry have been featured in many national newspapers, magazines, and television broadcasts, including: USA Today, Oprah magazine, The Washington Post, and Good Morning America. They have also been published in many research journals, including Journal of Clinical Nutrition, International Journal of Obesity, Health Psychology, and Obesity Research.

=== Articles ===
- Klem ML, Wing RR, McGuire MT, Seagle HM & Hill JO (1997). A descriptive study of individuals successful at long-term maintenance of substantial weight loss. American Journal of Clinical Nutrition, 66, 239-246.
- Shick SM, Wing RR, Klem ML, McGuire MT, Hill JO & Seagle HM (1998). Persons successful at long-term weight loss and maintenance continue to consume a low calorie, low fat diet. Journal of the American Dietetic Association, 98, 408-413.
- McGuire MT, Wing RR, Klem ML, Seagle HM & Hill JO (1998). Long-term maintenance of weight loss: Do people who lose weight through various weight loss methods use different behaviors to maintain their weight? International Journal of Obesity, 22, 572-577.
- Klem ML, Wing RR, McGuire MT, Seagle HM & Hill JO. (1998). Psychological symptoms in individuals successful at long-term maintenance of weight loss. Health Psychology, 17, 336-345.
- McGuire MT, Wing RR, Klem ML, Hill JO (1999). The Behavioral characteristics of individuals who lose weight unintentionally. Obesity Research, 7, 485-490.
- Wyatt HR, Grunwald GK, Seagle HM, Klem ML, McGuire MT, Wing RR & Hill JO. (1999). Resting energy expenditure in reduced-obese subjects in the National Weight Control Registry. American Journal of Clinical Nutrition, 69, 1189-1193.
- McGuire MT, Wing RR, Klem ML, Lang W & Hill JO. (1999). What predicts weight regain among a group of successful weight losers? Journal of Consulting and Clinical Psychology, 67, 177-185.
- McGuire MT, Wing RR, Klem ML, Hill JO. (1999). Behavioral strategies of individuals who have maintained long-term weight losses. Obesity Research, 7, 334-341.
- McGuire MT, Wing RR, Hill JO. (1999). The prevalence of weight loss maintenance among American adults. International Journal of Obesity, 23, 1314-1319.
- Klem ML, Wing RR, Chang CH, Lang W, McGuire MT, Sugerman HJ, Hutchison SL, Makovich AL & Hill JO. (2000). A case-control study of successful maintenance of a substantial weight loss: Individuals who lost weight through surgery versus those who lost weight through non-surgical means. International Journal of Obesity, 24, 573-579.
- Klem ML, Wing, RR, Lang W, McGuire MT & Hill JO. (2000). Does weight loss maintenance become easier over time? Obesity Research, 8, 438-444.
- Wing RR & Hill JO. (2001). Successful weight loss maintenance. Annual Review of Nutrition, 21, 323-341.
- Wyatt HR, Grunwald OK, Mosca CL, Klem ML, Wing RR, Hill JO. (2002). Long-term weight loss and breakfast in subjects in the National Weight Control Registry. Obesity Research, 10, 78-82.

For more, go to http://nwcr.ws/Research/published%20research.htm

== See also ==
- Dieting
- Human weight
- Obesity
- Clinical research
