= Food addiction =

Behavioral addiction characterized by compulsory indulgence over foods

A food addiction or eating addiction is any behavioral addiction characterized primarily by the compulsive consumption of palatable and hyperpalatable food items, and potentially also sweetened beverages. Such foods often have high sugar, fat, and salt contents (HFSS), and markedly activate the reward system in humans and other animals. Those with eating addictions often overconsume such foods despite the adverse consequences (such as excess weight gain, diabetes, and heart disease) associated with their overconsumption.

Psychological dependence has also been observed, with the occurrence of withdrawal symptoms when substituting foods low in sugar and fat. Professionals address psychological dependence by providing behavior therapy and through administering the YFAS (Yale Food Addiction Scale) questionnaire, a diagnostic criterion of substance dependence.

High-sugar and high-fat foods have been shown to increase the expression of ΔFosB, an addiction biomarker, in the D1-type medium spiny neurons of the nucleus accumbens; however, there is very little research on the synaptic plasticity from compulsive food consumption, a phenomenon which is known to be caused by ΔFosB overexpression.

== Description ==
Food addiction often refers to compulsive overeating; some who suffer from the condition engage in frequent episodes of uncontrollable eating (binge eating). The phrase was first used in a research-based publication, the Quarterly Journal of Studies on Alcohol, by American doctor Theron Randolph in 1956. It was continued to use throughout the late 1900s with more cases reported of the condition. In the 21st century, food addiction are often associated with eating disorders. The term binge eating is defined as eating an unhealthy amount of food while feeling that one's sense of control has been lost. Food addiction initially presents in the form of cravings, which cause a feeling that one cannot cope without the food in question. As the disorder progresses, behavior is modified in order to satisfy the urge for the food. These behavioral changes can result in binge eating disorder, obesity, and bulimia nervosa. A study in Physiology & Behavior by Parylak et al. suggests that animal models given free access to food become more emotionally withdrawn once the food is unavailable due to the anxiogenic stimulus for more food that results. This behavior may suggest that food addiction is not only a problem of self-control, but that it is furthermore the body providing a stimulus so powerful as to numb the individual to the negative consequences of overeating.

People who engage in binge eating may feel frenzied, and consume a large number of calories before stopping. Food binges may be followed by feelings of guilt and depression. Binge eating also has implications on physical health, due to excessive intake of fats and sugars, which can cause numerous health problems.

Unlike individuals with bulimia nervosa, persons with compulsive overeating do not attempt to compensate for their bingeing with purging behaviors, such as fasting, laxative use, or vomiting. When a person suffering from compulsive overeating through binge eating experiences feelings of guilt after their binges, that person can be said to have binge eating disorder (BED).

In addition to binge eating, compulsive overeaters may also engage in "grazing" behavior, during which they continuously eat throughout the day. These actions result in an excessive overall number of calories consumed, even if the quantities eaten at any one time may be small. There are two different types of grazing: non-compulsive grazing and compulsive grazing. Non-compulsive grazing is when the individual eats over an extended period of time, but the individual is not feeling the insatiable need to eat. In contrast, compulsive grazing is similar to non-compulsive grazing, but the individual feels a need or desire to continuously eat.

During binges, compulsive overeaters may consume between 5,000 and 15,000 food calories daily, resulting in a temporary release from psychological stress through an addictive high, not unlike that experienced through drug abuse. Compulsive overeaters tend to show brain changes similar to those of drug addicts, a result of excessive consumption of highly processed food (most likely consisting of high amounts of saturated fat, which is more energy-rich). Unlike smoking, drugs, or alcoholism, people with food cravings are not under a type of substance use disorder. Food addiction is more commonly associated with a behavioral addiction to a form of processed food that is not generally healthy.

== Signs and symptoms ==
A food addiction features compulsive overeating, such as binge eating behavior, as its core and only defining feature. There are several potential signs that a person may be experiencing compulsive overeating. Common behaviors of compulsive overeaters include eating alone, consuming food quickly, gaining weight rapidly, and eating to the point of stomach discomfort. Other signs include significantly decreased mobility and withdrawal from activities due to weight gain. Emotional indicators can include feelings of guilt, a sense of loss of control, depression and mood swings.

Hiding consumption is an emotional indicator of other symptoms that could be a result of having a food addiction. Hiding consumption of food includes behaviors such as eating in secret, eating late at night, eating in a vehicle, and hiding certain foods until ready to consume in private. Other signs of hiding consumption are avoiding social interactions to eat the specific foods that are craved. Other emotional indicators are inner guilt, which may consist of rationalizing why the food would be beneficial to consume, as well as feeling guilty shortly after consuming the food.

Sense of loss of control may be indicated in many ways, such as expending more effort than usual to obtain specific foods, or spending unnecessary amounts of money on foods to satisfy cravings. This sense of loss of control may impede function during work due to disorganized thoughts, leading to a decrease in efficiency. Another indication is craving food despite being full. One may set rules to try to eat healthy, but find themselves frustrated when they are overruled by their cravings. A large indicator of loss of control due to food addiction is knowing one has a medical problem caused by their behaviors, but not being able to stop consuming the foods, further compromising one's health.

Food addiction has some physical signs and symptoms, including decreased energy; decreased ability for activity compared to the past or compared to others; decreased mental efficiency due to the lack of nutritive energy; fatigue; hypersomnia; and insomnia. Other physical signs and symptoms are restlessness, irritability, digestive disorders, and headaches.

In extreme cases food addiction can result in suicidal thoughts.

== Effects ==
Obesity has been attributed to eating behavior or fast food, personality issues, depression, genetics, and also social and environmental conditions such as walkability and access to diverse foods. A lack of access to diverse foods could be caused by food deserts. Other effects of obesity could be an increased risk for type 2 diabetes, cardiovascular diseases, and certain cancers. Food addiction might be one supplementary explanation for the epidemic of obesity overall.

== Management ==
Compulsive overeating is treatable with nutritional assistance and medication. Psychotherapy may also be required, but recent research has shown this to be useful only as a complementary resource, with short-term effectiveness in moderate to severe cases.

Lisdexamfetamine is an FDA-approved appetite suppressant drug that is indicated (i.e., used clinically) for the treatment of binge eating disorder. The antidepressant fluoxetine is a medication that is approved by the Food and Drug Administration for the treatment of an eating disorder, specifically bulimia nervosa. This medication has been prescribed off-label for the treatment of binge eating disorder. Off-label medications, such as other selective serotonin reuptake inhibitors (SSRIs), have shown some efficacy, as have several atypical antidepressants, such as mianserin, trazodone and bupropion. Anti-obesity medications have also proven very effective. Studies suggest that anti-obesity drugs, or moderate appetite suppressants, may be key to controlling binge eating.

Many eating disorders are thought to be behavioral patterns that stem from emotional struggles; for the individual to develop lasting improvement and a healthy relationship with food, these behavioral obstacles need to be resolved.

Treatment can include talk therapy and medical and nutritional counseling.

The American Dental Association has sanctioned these suggestions, stating:

Given the continued increase in obesity in the United States and the willingness of dentists to assist in prevention and interventional effort, experts in obesity intervention in conjunction with dental educators should develop models of intervention within the scope of dental practice.

— Journal of the American Dental Association

Moreover, dental appliances such as conventional jaw wiring and orthodontic wiring have been shown to be efficient methods of weight control in obese patients, with a low incidence of serious complications.

Several twelve-step programs exist to help members recover from compulsive overeating and food addiction, such as Overeaters Anonymous.

The Ontario Health Insurance Plan has announced a new program designed to assist individuals struggling with food addiction.

== Prognosis ==
Left untreated, food addiction can lead to chronic conditions and eventually death.

In an individual diagnosed with an eating disorder such as BED, the chances for relapse are high. Those with a food addiction were most likely overweight in childhood, which may lead to treatment resistance depending on the amount of time gone untreated. Due to poor mental health and lack of control and environmental factors, overeaters may relapse into their old habits even after completing various treatments. BED patients often report and acknowledge using substances daily as a coping mechanism.

However, with treatment and follow-ups, there is a 50% chance of recovery. Success in overcoming this disorder rests on following treatment directions and a properly supportive environment in which to recover.

There is a higher chance of successful treatment in teenage populations, in which denial is less ingrained than adults.

== Epidemiology ==
A review on behavioral addictions estimated the lifetime prevalence (i.e., the proportion of individuals in the population that developed the disorder during their lifetime) for food addiction in the United States as 2.8%.

As obesity continues to grow into a worldwide problem, solutions such as a sugar tax have been suggested. A sugar tax is set to be introduced in Ireland to minimise the consumption of harmful foods and drinks.

== Summary of addiction-related plasticity ==
Form of neuroplasticity or behavioral plasticity	Type of reinforcer						Ref.
Form of neuroplasticity or behavioral plasticity	Opiates	Psychostimulants	High fat or sugar food	Sexual intercourse	Physical exercise (aerobic)	Environmental enrichment	Ref.
ΔFosB expression in nucleus accumbens D1-type MSNs	↑	↑	↑	↑	↑	↑	
Behavioral plasticity
Escalation of intake	Yes	Yes	Yes				
Psychostimulant cross-sensitization	Yes	Not applicable	Yes	Yes	Attenuated	Attenuated	
Psychostimulant self-administration	↑	↑	↓		↓	↓	
Psychostimulant conditioned place preference	↑	↑	↓	↑	↓	↑	
Reinstatement of drug-seeking behavior	↑	↑			↓	↓	
Neurochemical plasticity
CREB phosphorylation in the nucleus accumbens	↓	↓	↓		↓	↓	
Sensitized dopamine response in the nucleus accumbens	No	Yes	No	Yes			
Altered striatal dopamine signaling	↓DRD2, ↑DRD3	↑DRD1, ↓DRD2, ↑DRD3	↑DRD1, ↓DRD2, ↑DRD3		↑DRD2	↑DRD2	
Altered striatal opioid signaling	No change or ↑μ-opioid receptors	↑μ-opioid receptors ↑κ-opioid receptors	↑μ-opioid receptors	↑μ-opioid receptors	No change	No change	
Changes in striatal opioid peptides	↑dynorphin No change: enkephalin	↑dynorphin	↓enkephalin		↑dynorphin	↑dynorphin	
Mesocorticolimbic synaptic plasticity
Number of dendrites in the nucleus accumbens	↓	↑		↑			
Dendritic spine density in the nucleus accumbens	↓	↑		↑			

== See also ==
- Alcoholism
- Binge eating disorder
- Binge eating
- Bulimia nervosa
- Eating disorder
- Eating disorder not otherwise specified
- Food Addicts Anonymous
- Food Addicts in Recovery Anonymous
- Gluttony
- Hyperalimentation – overnutrition
- Overeaters Anonymous
- Overeating
- Polyphagia – excessive hunger
- SMART Recovery
- Sugar industry
