= Robert Rosen =

Robert Rosen may refer to:

- Robert Ross (entrepreneur) (Robert Rosen, 1918–2011), founder of one medical school in Dominica and another in St. Kitts
- Robert Rosen (photographer), Australian photographer
- Robert Rosen (biologist) (1934–1998), American theoretical biologist
- Robert Rosen (writer) (born 1952), American author
- Robert Ozn (Robert M. Rosen, born 1964), American producer, screenwriter, and entertainer
- Robert Rosén (born 1987), Swedish ice hockey player

== See also ==
- Robert Rose (disambiguation)
- Bert Rose (1919–2001), football executive
- Robert Rossen (1908–1966), American screenwriter, film director, and producer
