= Food Addicts in Recovery Anonymous =

Twelve-step program

Food Addicts in Recovery Anonymous (FA) founded in 1998 is a program of recovery based on the twelve steps of Alcoholics Anonymous. FA members are men and women of all ages. Some have been obese; others have been severely underweight, bulimic, or so obsessed with food or weight that normal life was difficult or impossible. The common denominator uniting members of FA is addiction and a relationship with food that parallels an alcoholic's relationship with alcohol. The program offers the hope of long-term recovery, evidenced by members who have continuously maintained a normal weight and healthy eating for periods of twenty-five or even thirty years.

FA was established in 1998 by former members of Overeaters Anonymous. As of 2011, the organization consisted of over 500 local groups and over 4000 members in 6 countries, Australia, Canada, Germany, New Zealand, United Kingdom, and the United States. In 2012, FA published Food Addicts in Recovery Anonymous.

== Definitions ==
Food addiction is defined in FA as "an illness of the mind, body, and spirit for which there is no cure". As is the case with other addictions, food addiction involves physical craving and an ever-increasing dependence upon and struggle with a substance (food). The manifestations of food addiction vary. Overeating, under-eating or self-starvation, bulimia (including exercise bulimia), and extreme obsession with weight or food are among the symptoms of this addiction.

Abstinence in FA is the parallel of sobriety in A.A. Abstinence is a planned, disciplined way of eating that leads to the addict's release from food cravings, obsession, and self-abuse. Abstinence is simple and clear, but it is difficult to sustain continuously over the course of a lifetime. FA believes food addicts have an allergy to flour, sugar and quantities that sets up an uncontrollable craving. The problem can be arrested a day at a time by the action of weighing and measuring our food and abstaining completely from all flour and sugar. FA defines abstinence as weighed and measured meals with nothing in between, no flour, no sugar and the avoidance of any individual binge foods.

Sponsors are FA members who are committed to abstinence and to living the Twelve Steps and Twelve Traditions to the best of their ability. Sponsors share their program up to the level of their own experience.

=== Meetings ===
FA Meetings are central to the FA program of recovery. You can find the list of all meetings on the FA website. Meetings break the isolation that is part of the disease of food addiction and provide the opportunity for newcomers and members to learn from abstinent speakers who share their experience, strength, and hope. Members attend three meetings each week and those with 90 days of abstinence from food addiction share at a group level. Meetings are open to all FA members and those who are interested in learning about the program for themselves or for others whom they think might find FA helpful.

== Literature ==
The FA book, Food Addicts in Recovery Anonymous describes the possibility of long-term, continuous recovery from food addiction offered by Food Addicts in Recovery Anonymous (FA), a program based on the Twelve Steps pioneered by Alcoholics Anonymous. The book begins with a description of the experience of food addiction and its symptoms, which can include obesity, extreme thinness, bulimia, exercise compulsion, or a normal weight maintained at the expense of debilitating obsession. Most of the book consists of individual accounts of food addiction and FA recovery, some from members with over thirty years of sustained, one-day-at-a-time success. The volume includes a doctor's perspective, a chapter for family and friends, and a discussion of each of the Twelve Steps. Additionally, FA publishes several pamphlets, a periodical known as connection and produces audio recordings from successful members.

== Demographics and results ==
A self-published survey of FA membership in 2011 showed 80% of members had lost 25 lbs. or more, and of those, 50% were at their goal weight. At that time, 33% of FA members had over 13 months of recovery from food addiction, and 22% had between 3 and 30 years with no return to food addiction.

== History ==
In the early 1980s, the FA program began to take form within the context of Overeaters Anonymous (OA), another twelve step program. At that time, in the Chelsea, Massachusetts, area several OA meetings began to embrace a set of distinctive practices. The meetings were united by a shared definition of abstinence; the requirement that speakers at each meeting have a minimum of 90 days of continuous abstinence; the practice of doing the Twelve Steps in AWOL groups; and the belief that overeating, under-eating, bulimia, and other food-related, self-destructive behaviors are symptoms of the disease of addiction. These meetings were popularly called or criticized as "90-day meetings".

Over time, it became clear that the program of the "90-day meetings" was distinctive from that of OA. Further, this program had grown. Members moved from the Boston area to Michigan, Florida, Texas, New York, California, Australia, and Germany, taking their recovery with them and establishing meetings in communities where they lived. In 1998, a small group gathered to discuss the possibility of establishing a separate program. "Food Addicts in Recovery Anonymous" was launched later that year. The organization was legally incorporated in 1998.

In May 1998, FA consisted of 18 meetings with approximately 177 members. By 2001, the program had grown to 122 meetings, with almost 1,000 members. The first business convention, held to coordinate FA service to newcomers, took place that year.

== Organizational and financial structure ==
Food Addicts in Recovery Anonymous, Inc. is the umbrella entity that supports meeting groups and FA individuals around the world. It is internally known as "WSI" (for World Service Incorporated). WSI is led by thirteen elected trustees (members of FA) and is headquartered in Woburn, Massachusetts. FA meetings are also supported and united by incorporated regional associations (intergroups) and smaller, unincorporated regional affiliations (chapters).

Food Addicts in Recovery Anonymous, Inc. is a 501(c)(3) non-profit charitable organization that is primarily funded through contributions given by members of FA. The acceptance of bequests or donations from non-members, outside organizations, and anonymous donors is prohibited. Individual members are restricted to donations or bequests of no more than $2,000 in a year.

== See also ==
- Addiction recovery groups
- Eating disorder
- List of twelve-step groups
- Self-help groups for mental health
