= Nutrition scale =

A nutrition scale is a weighing instrument that outputs precise nutritional information for foods or liquids. Most scales calculate calories, carbohydrates, and fats, with more sophisticated scales calculating additional nutrients such as Vitamin K, potassium, magnesium, and sodium.

Scales often use USDA information on food to ensure accuracy. The products are used primarily as a weight-management tool but have found a user base of diabetics and hypertensive people.

Some scales have a tare function, which allows you to zero out the weight of the container before adding the food.
