= Dieting =

Regulation of the consumption of food

Dieting is the practice of eating food in a regulated way to decrease, maintain, or increase body weight, or to prevent and treat diseases such as diabetes and obesity. As weight loss depends on calorie intake, different kinds of calorie-reduced diets, such as those emphasising particular macronutrients (low-fat, low-carbohydrate, etc.), have been shown to be no more effective than one another. As weight regain is common, diet success is best predicted by long-term adherence. Regardless, the outcome of a diet can vary widely depending on the individual.

The first popular diet was "Banting", named after English undertaker William Banting. In his 1863 pamphlet, Letter on Corpulence, Addressed to the Public, he outlined the details of a particular low-carbohydrate, low-calorie diet that led to his own dramatic weight loss.

Some guidelines recommend dieting to lose weight for people with weight-related health problems, but not for otherwise healthy people. One survey found that almost half of all American adults attempt to lose weight through dieting, including 66.7% of obese adults and 26.5% of normal weight or underweight adults. Dieters who are overweight (but not obese), who are normal weight, or who are underweight may have an increased mortality rate as a result of dieting.

== History ==
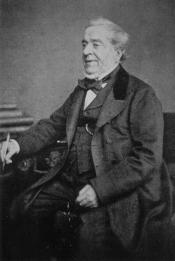
William Banting popularized one of the first weight loss diets in the 19th century.

The word diet comes from the Greek δίαιτα (diaita), which represents a notion of a whole way healthy lifestyle including both mental and physical health, rather than a narrow weight-loss regimen.

One of the first dietitians was the English doctor George Cheyne. He himself was tremendously overweight and would constantly eat large quantities of rich food and drink. He began a meatless diet, taking only milk and vegetables, and soon regained his health. He began publicly recommending his diet for everyone who was obese. In 1724, he wrote An Essay of Health and Long Life, in which he advises exercise and fresh air and avoiding luxury foods.

The Scottish military surgeon, John Rollo, published Notes of a Diabetic Case in 1797. It described the benefits of a meat diet for those with diabetes, basing this recommendation on Matthew Dobson's discovery of glycosuria in diabetes mellitus. By means of Dobson's testing procedure (for glucose in the urine) Rollo worked out a diet that had success for what is now called type 2 diabetes.

The first popular diet was "Banting", named after the English undertaker William Banting. In 1863, he wrote a booklet called Letter on Corpulence, Addressed to the Public, which contained the particular plan for the diet he had successfully followed. His own diet was four meals per day, consisting of meat, greens, fruits, and dry wine. The emphasis was on avoiding sugar, sweet foods, starch, beer, milk and butter. Banting's pamphlet was popular for years to come, and would be used as a model for modern diets. The pamphlet's popularity was such that the question "Do you bant?" referred to his method, and eventually to dieting in general. His booklet remains in print as of 2007.

The first weight-loss book to promote calorie counting, and the first weight-loss book to become a bestseller, was the 1918 Diet and Health: With Key to the Calories by American physician and columnist Lulu Hunt Peters.

It was estimated that over 1000 weight-loss diets have been developed up to 2014.

== Types ==
A restricted diet is most commonly pursued by those who want to lose weight. Some people follow a diet to gain weight (such as people who are underweight or who are attempting to gain more muscle). Diets can also be used to maintain a stable body weight or to improve health.

=== Low-fat ===
Low-fat diets involve the reduction of the percentage of fat in one's diet. Calorie consumption is reduced because less fat is consumed. Diets of this type include NCEP Step I and II. A meta-analysis of 16 trials of 2–12 months' duration found that low-fat diets (without intentional restriction of caloric intake) resulted in average weight loss of 3.2 kg (7.1 lb) over habitual eating.

A low-fat, plant-based diet has been found to improve control of weight, blood sugar levels, and cardiovascular health.

=== Low-carbohydrate ===
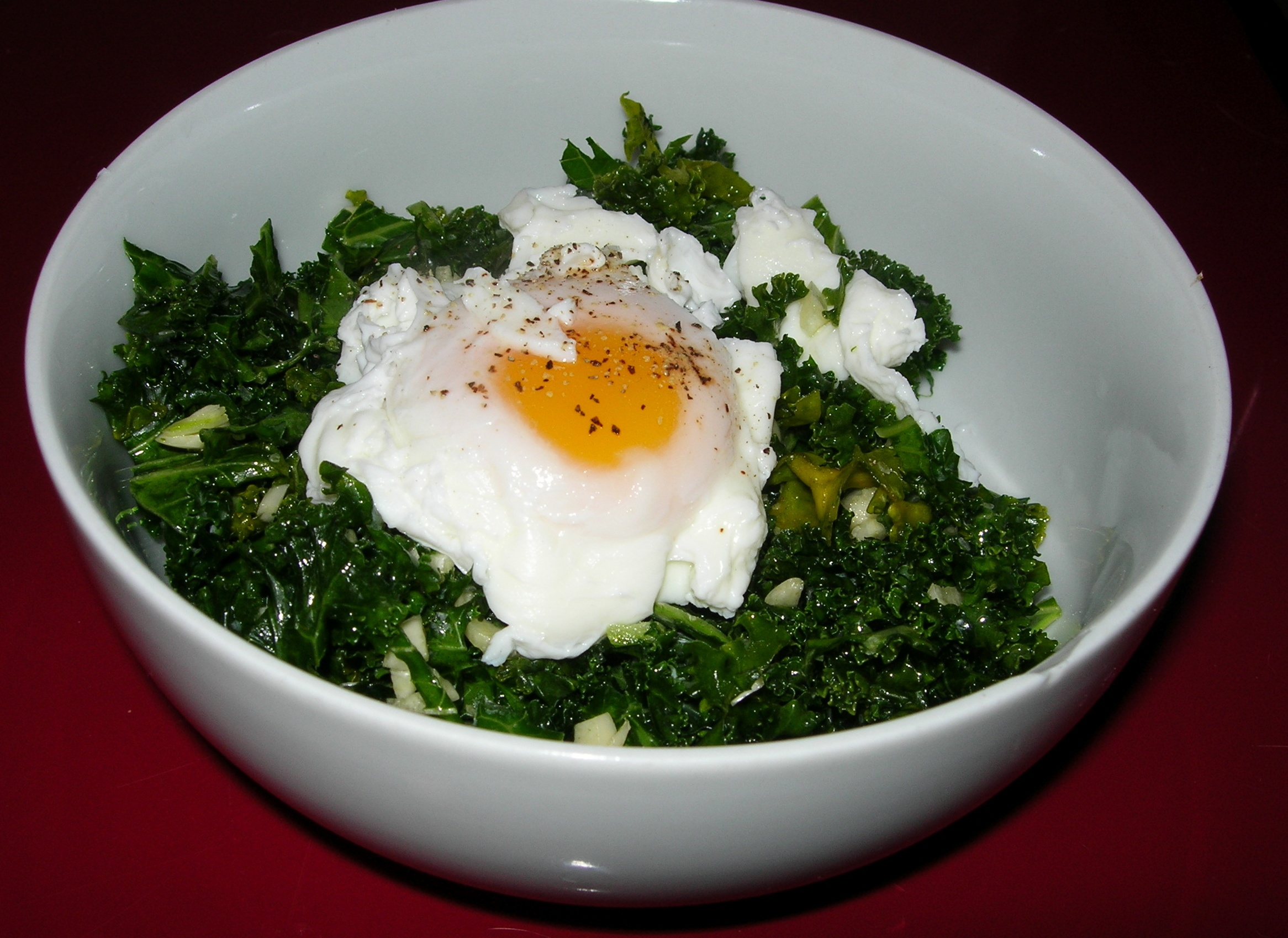
An example of a low-carbohydrate dish, cooked kale and poached eggs

Low-carbohydrate diets restrict carbohydrate consumption relative to the average diet. Foods high in carbohydrates (e.g., sugar, bread, pasta) are limited, and replaced with foods containing a higher percentage of fat and protein (e.g., meat, poultry, fish, shellfish, eggs, cheese, nuts, and seeds), as well as low carbohydrate foods (e.g. spinach, kale, chard, collards, and other fibrous vegetables).

There is a lack of standardization of how much carbohydrate low-carbohydrate diets must have, and this has complicated research. One definition, from the American Academy of Family Physicians, specifies low-carbohydrate diets as having less than 20% of calories from carbohydrates.

There is no good evidence that low-carbohydrate dieting in general confers any particular health benefits apart from weight loss, where low-carbohydrate diets achieve outcomes similar to other diets, as weight loss is mainly determined by calorie restriction and adherence.

One particular form of low-carbohydrate diet called the ketogenic diet was first established as a medical diet for treating epilepsy. It became a popular diet for weight loss through celebrity endorsement, but there is no evidence of any distinctive benefit for this purpose and the diet carries a risk of adverse effects, with the British Dietetic Association naming it one of the "top five worst celeb diets to avoid" in 2018.

=== Low-calorie ===
Low-calorie diets usually produce an energy deficit of 500–1,000 calories per day, which can result in a 0.5 to 1 kilogram (1.1 to 2.2 pounds) weight loss per week. The National Institutes of Health reviewed 34 randomized controlled trials to determine the effectiveness of low-calorie diets. They found that these diets lowered total body mass by 8% in the short term, over 3–12 months. Women doing low-calorie diets should have at least 1,000 calories per day and men should have approximately 1,200 calories per day. These caloric intake values vary depending on additional factors, such as age and weight.

=== Very low-calorie ===
Very low calorie diets provide 200–800 calories per day, maintaining protein intake but limiting calories from both fat and carbohydrates. They subject the body to starvation and produce an average loss of 1.5–2.5 kg (3.3–5.5 lb) per week. "2-4-6-8", a popular diet of this variety, follows a four-day cycle in which only 200 calories are consumed the first day, 400 the second day, 600 the third day, 800 the fourth day, and then totally fasting, after which the cycle repeats. There is some evidence that these diets results in considerable weight loss. These diets are not recommended for general use and should be reserved for the management of obesity as they are associated with adverse side effects such as loss of lean muscle mass, increased risks of gout, and electrolyte imbalances. People attempting these diets must be monitored closely by a physician to prevent complications.

The concept of crash dieting is to drastically reduce calories, using a very-low-calorie diet. Crash dieting can be highly dangerous because it can cause various kind of issues for the human body. Crash dieting can produce weight loss but without professional supervision all along, the extreme reduction in calories and potential unbalance in the diet's composition can lead to detrimental effects, including sudden death.

=== Fasting ===
Fasting is the act of intentional taking a long time interval between meals. Lengthy fasting (multiple days in a week) might be dangerous due to the risk of malnutrition. During prolonged fasting or very low calorie diets the reduction of blood glucose, the preferred energy source of the brain, causes the body to deplete its glycogen stores. Once glycogen is depleted the body begins to fuel the brain using ketones, while also metabolizing body protein (including but not limited to skeletal muscle) to be used to synthesize sugars for use as energy by the rest of the body. Most experts believe that a prolonged fast can lead to muscle wasting. The use of short-term fasting, or various forms of intermittent fasting, have been used as a form of dieting to circumvent the issues of long fasting.

Intermittent fasting commonly takes the form of periodic fasting, alternate-day fasting, time-restricted feeding, and/or religious fasting. It can be a form of reduced-calorie dieting but pertains entirely to when the metabolism is activated during the day for digestion. The changes to eating habits on a regular basis do not have to be severe or absolutely restrictive to see benefits to cardiovascular health, such as improved glucose metabolism, reduced inflammation, and reduced blood pressure. Studies have suggested that for people in intensive care, an intermittent fasting regimen might "[preserve] energy supply to vital organs and tissues... [and] powerfully activates cell-protective and cellular repair pathways, including autophagy, mitochondrial biogenesis and antioxidant defenses, which may promote resilience to cellular stress." There is evidence demonstrating profound metabolic benefits of intermittent fasting in rodents. However, evidence is lacking or contradictory in humans and requires further investigation, especially over the long-term. Some evidence suggests that intermittent restriction of caloric intake has no weight-loss advantages over continuous calorie restriction plans. For adults, fasting diets appear to be safe and tolerable, however there is a possibility that periods of fasting and hunger could lead to overeating and to weight regain after the fasting period. Adverse effects of fasting are often moderate and include halitosis, fatigue, weakness, and headaches. Fasting diets may be harmful to children and the elderly.

=== Exclusion diet ===
This type of diet is based on the restriction of specific foods or food groups. Examples include gluten-free, Paleo, plant-based, and Mediterranean diets.

Plant-based diets include vegetarian and vegan diets, and can range from the simple exclusion of meat products to diets that only include raw vegetables, fruits, nuts, seeds, legumes, and sprouted grains. Exclusion of animal products can reduce the intake of certain nutrients, which might lead to nutritional deficiencies of protein, iron, zinc, calcium, and vitamins D and B_{12}. Therefore, long term implementation of a plant-based diet requires effective counseling and nutritional supplementation as necessary. Plant-based diets are effective for short-term treatment of overweight and obesity, likely due to the high consumption of low energy density foods. However, evidence for long-term efficacy is limited.

The Paleo diet includes foods that it identifies as having been available to Paleolithic peoples including meat, nuts, eggs, some oils, fresh fruits, and vegetables. Overall, it is high in protein and moderate in fats and carbohydrates. Some limited evidence suggests various health benefits and effective weight loss with this diet. However, similar to the plant-based diet, the Paleo diet has potential nutritional deficiency risks, specifically with vitamin D, calcium, and iodine.

Gluten-free diets are often used for weight loss but little has been studied about the efficacy of this diet and metabolic mechanism for its effectiveness is unclear.

=== Nutrient-dense diets ===
Nutrient-dense diets often allow for more flexibility in calories, assuming that eating high-quality, nutrient-dense foods will naturally lead to a healthier weight, better satiety, and lifestyle sustainability. These diets prioritize foods that are high in nutrients relative to their caloric content, such as vegetables and fruits.

The Mediterranean Diet is characterized by high consumption of vegetables, fruits, legumes, whole-grain cereals, seafood, olive oil, and nuts. Red meat, dairy and alcohol are only recommended in moderation. Studies show that the Mediterranean diet is associated with short term as well as long term weight loss in addition to health and metabolic benefits.

Dietary Approaches to Stop Hypertension (DASH) promotes eating plenty of fruits and vegetables, lean meats, dairy, and essential micronutrients; limiting sodium intake to about 1,500 mg per day; and choosing fresh, minimally processed foods. The DASH diet has been shown to lower many disease risk factors, including high blood pressure and long-term weight gain, and is consistently linked to reduced risks of major health events. A modified version of the DASH diet—higher in vegetable-based fats and lower in carbohydrates, similar to the Mediterranean diet—has also been shown to improve cardiometabolic health.

The Mayo Clinic Diet diet begins with a two-week period of identifying five unhealthy habits, replacing them with five healthy habits, and adopting five bonus habits, including prioritizing fruits and vegetables, of which dieters can eat as many as they want. It puts carbohydrates, meat and dairy, fats, and sweets into progressively more limited daily allowances. The diet emphasizes setting realistic goals, replacing poor health habits with good ones, and conscious portion control. The remainder of the program is based in large part on a combination of portion control and physical activity. This part of the program is designed to allow the safe loss of one to two pounds per week, or 50 to 100 pounds (22 to 45 kilograms) over the course of a year.

=== Detox diet ===
Detox diets are promoted with unsubstantiated claims that they can eliminate "toxins" from the human body. Many of these diets use herbs or celery and other juicy low-calorie vegetables. Detox diets can include fasting or exclusion (as in juice fasting). Detox diets tend to result in short-term weight loss (because of calorie restriction), followed by weight gain.

=== Environmentally sustainable ===
Another kind of diet focuses not on the dieter's health effects, but on its environment. The One Blue Dot plan of the BDA offers recommendations towards reducing diets' environmental impacts, by:

1. Reducing meat to 70g per person per day.
2. Prioritising plant proteins.
3. Promoting fish from sustainable sources.
4. Moderate dairy consumption.
5. Focusing on wholegrain starchy foods.
6. Promoting seasonal locally sourced fruits and vegetables.
7. Reducing high fat, sugar and salty foods overconsumption.
8. Promoting tap water and unsweetened tea/coffee as the de facto choice for healthy hydration.
9. Reducing food waste.

== Effectiveness ==
Several diets are effective for short-term weight loss for obese individuals, with diet success most predicted by adherence and little effect resulting from the type or brand of diet. As weight maintenance depends on calorie intake, diets emphasising certain macronutrients (low-fat, low-carbohydrate, etc.) have been shown to be no more effective than one another and no more effective than diets that maintain a typical mix of foods with smaller portions and perhaps some substitutions (e.g. low-fat milk, or less salad dressing). A meta-analysis of six randomized controlled trials found no difference between low-calorie, low-carbohydrate, and low-fat diets in terms of short-term weight loss, with a 2–4 kilogram weight loss over 12–18 months in all studies. Low-fat and low-carb diets may differentially affect metabolic markers such as triglycerides or HDL and LDL cholesterol. However, because much of the metabolic benefit of diet in obesity is mediated by weight loss itself, differences owing to macronutrient composition are small. Diets that severely restrict calorie intake do not lead to long term weight loss. Extreme diets may, in some cases, lead to malnutrition.

A major challenge regarding weight loss and dieting relates to compliance. While dieting can effectively promote weight loss in the short term, the intervention is hard to maintain over time and suppresses skeletal muscle thermogenesis. Suppressed thermogenesis accelerates weight regain once the diet stops, unless that phase is accompanied by a well-timed exercise intervention, as described by the Summermatter cycle. Most diet studies do not assess long-term weight loss.

Some studies have found that, on average, short-term dieting results in a "meaningful" long-term weight-loss, although limited because of gradual 1 to 2 kg/year weight regain. Because people who do not participate in weight-loss programs also tend to gain weight over time, and baseline data from such "untreated" participants are typically not included in diet studies, it is possible that diets do result in lower weights in the long-term relative to people who do not diet. Others have suggested that dieting is ineffective as a long-term intervention. For each individual, the results will be different, with some even regaining more weight than they lost, while a few others achieve a tremendous loss, so that the "average weight loss" of a diet is not indicative of the results other dieters may achieve. A 2001 meta-analysis of 29 American studies found that participants of structured weight-loss programs maintained an average of 23% (3 kg) of their initial weight loss after five years, representing a sustained 3.2% reduction in body mass. Unfortunately, patients are generally unhappy with weight loss of <10%, and reductions even as high as 10% are insufficient for changing someone with an "obese" BMI to a "normal weight" BMI.

Partly because diets do not reliably produce long-term positive health outcomes, some argue against using weight loss as a goal, preferring other measures of health such as improvements in cardiovascular biomarkers, sometimes called a Health at Every Size (HAES) approach or a "weight neutral" approach.

Long term losses from dieting are best maintained with continuing professional support, long term increases in physical activity, the use of anti-obesity medications, continued use of meal replacements, and additional periods of dieting to undo weight regain. The most effective approach to weight loss is an in-person, high-intensity, comprehensive lifestyle intervention: overweight or obese adults should maintain regular (at least monthly) contact with a trained interventionalist who can help them engage in exercise, monitor their body weight, and reduce their calorie consumption. Even with high-intensity, comprehensive lifestyle interventions (consisting of diet, physical exercise, and bimonthly or even more frequent contact with trained interventionists), gradual weight regain of 1–2 kg/year still occurs. For patients at high medical risk, bariatric surgery or medications may be warranted in addition to the lifestyle intervention, as dieting by itself may not lead to sustained weight loss.

Many studies overestimate the benefits of calorie restriction because the studies confound exercise and diet (testing the effects of diet and exercise as a combined intervention, rather than the effects of diet alone).

=== Adverse effects ===
==== Increased mortality rate ====
A number of studies have found that intentional weight loss is associated with an increase in mortality in people without weight-related health problems. A 2009 meta-analysis of 26 studies found that "intentional weight loss had a small benefit for individuals classified as unhealthy (with obesity-related risk factors), especially unhealthy obese, but appeared to be associated with slightly increased mortality for healthy individuals, and for those who were overweight but not obese."

==== Dietary supplements ====
Due to extreme or unbalanced diets, dietary supplements are sometimes taken in an attempt to replace missing vitamins or minerals. While some supplements could be helpful for people eating an unbalanced diet (if replacing essential nutrients, for example), overdosing on any dietary supplement can cause a range of side effects depending on the supplement and dose that is taken. Supplements should not replace foods that are important to a healthy diet.

==== Eating disorders ====
In an editorial for Psychological Medicine, George Hsu concludes that dieting is likely to lead to the development of an eating disorder in the presence of certain risk factors. A 2006 study found that dieting and unhealthy weight-control behaviors were predictive of obesity and eating disorders five years later, with the authors recommending a "shift away from dieting and drastic weight-control measures toward the long-term implementation of healthful eating and physical activity".

== Mechanism ==
When the body is expending more energy than it is consuming (e.g. when exercising), the body's cells rely on internally stored energy sources, such as complex carbohydrates and fats, for energy. The first source to which the body turns is glycogen (by glycogenolysis). Glycogen is a complex carbohydrate, 65% of which is stored in skeletal muscles and the remainder in the liver (totaling about 2,000 kcal in the whole body). It is created from the excess of ingested macronutrients, mainly carbohydrates. When glycogen is nearly depleted, the body begins lipolysis, the mobilization and catabolism of fat stores for energy. In this process fats, obtained from adipose tissue, or fat cells, are broken down into glycerol and fatty acids, which can be used to generate energy. The primary by-products of metabolism are carbon dioxide and water; carbon dioxide is expelled through the respiratory system.

=== Set-Point Theory ===
The Set-Point Theory, first introduced in 1953, postulated that each body has a preprogrammed fixed weight, with regulatory mechanisms to compensate. This theory was quickly adopted and used to explain failures in developing effective and sustained weight loss procedures. A 2019 systematic review of multiple weight change procedures, including alternate day fasting and time-restricted feeding but also exercise and overeating, found systematic "energetic errors" for all these procedures. This shows that the body cannot precisely compensate for errors in energy/calorie intake, countering the Set-Point Theory and potentially explaining both weight loss and weight gain such as obesity. This review was conducted on short-term studies, therefore such a mechanism cannot be excluded in the long term, as evidence is currently lacking on this timeframe.

== Methods ==
=== Meal timing ===
A meal timing schedule is known to be an important factor of any diet. Recent evidence suggest that new scheduling strategies, such as intermittent fasting or skipping meals, and strategically placed snacks before meals, may be recommendable to reduce cardiovascular risks as part of a broader lifestyle and dietary change.

=== Food diary ===
A 2008 study published in the American Journal of Preventive Medicine showed that dieters who kept a daily food diary (or diet journal), lost twice as much weight as those who did not keep a food log, suggesting that if a person records their eating, they are more aware of what they consume and therefore eat fewer calories.

=== Water ===
A 2009 review found limited evidence suggesting that encouraging water consumption and substituting energy-free beverages for energy-containing beverages (i.e., reducing caloric intake) may facilitate weight management. A 2009 article found that drinking 500 ml of water prior to meals for a 12-week period resulted in increased long-term weight reduction. (References given in main article.)

== Society ==
It is estimated that about 1 out of 3 Americans is dieting at any given time. 85% of dieters are women. Approximately sixty billion dollars are spent every year in the USA on diet products, including "diet foods", such as light sodas, gym memberships or specific regimes. 80% of dieters start by themselves, whereas 20% see a professional or join a paid program. The typical dieter attempts 4 tries per year.

=== Weight loss groups ===
Some weight loss groups aim to make money, others work as charities. The former include Weight Watchers and Peertrainer. The latter include Overeaters Anonymous, TOPS Club and groups run by local organizations.

The customs and practices of weight-loss support groups vary widely. Some are modelled on twelve-step programs, while others are informal peer-support groups. Some promote specific meal plans or prepared foods, whereas others encourage participants to make healthier choices when shopping, cooking, and eating out.

Attending group meetings for weight reduction programmes rather than receiving one-on-one support may increase the likelihood that obese people will lose weight. Those who participated in groups had more treatment time and were more likely to lose enough weight to improve their health. Study authors suggested that one explanation for the difference is that group participants spent more time with the clinician (or whoever delivered the programme) than those receiving one-on-one support.

== See also ==
- Body image
- Carbon footprint
- Dietary Guidelines for Americans
- Food faddism
- High residue diet
- Intuitive eating
- List of diets
- National Weight Control Registry
- Nutrigenomics
- Nutrition psychology
- Nutrition scale
- Nutritional rating systems
- Online weight loss plans
- Superfood
- Table of food nutrients
- Underweight
