= Jaw wiring =

Mechanical procedure to keep the jaw closed

Jaw wiring is a medical procedure to keep the jaw closed for a period of time. Originally, it was used as the mandibular equivalent of a cast, to fix the jaw in place while a fracture healed. Jaw wiring is also used for weight-loss purposes, to prevent the ingestion of solid food.

== Mechanism ==
Jaw wiring is performed by attaching orthodontic brackets to the teeth, and wrapping pliable wire either around or through the brackets or with the use of arch bars or loops affixed with wires around the teeth, or with metal splints bonded to the teeth. The wiring may be configured to immobilise the jaw in the case of fracture or surgery or to place the patient’s lower jaw in a semi-closed resting position. This permits a moderate amount of jaw movement and relatively clear speech, but inhibits the ingestion of solid foods, forcing patients to adhere to a liquid diet.

== Types ==
=== Inter-maxillary fixation ===
This type of jaw wiring, also known as maxillo-mandibular fixation (MMF), is used in patients with mandibular fractures or those who need orthognathic surgery to correct deformed jaws. It is performed by an oral surgeon, who attaches an "arch bar" to the upper jaw and another to the lower jaw with thin wires that are threaded between and around the teeth. The arch bars completely enwrap the dental arch. The upper and lower arch bars are connected to each other with wires or elastics, compressing the upper teeth against the lower teeth and preventing jaw movement. IMF is an invasive procedure performed under general anesthesia. Once the bones have set (usually after 4–6 weeks, sometimes two or three months), the wiring is removed under local anesthesia or nitrous oxide sedation.

There are other methods for wiring teeth together. Ivy loops are a method by which wires are passed between the teeth and gums and then fastened with a loop at the front, and wires are then secured to these loops. Cap splints are metal splints which cover the entire surface of the teeth. Fixation can also be achieved by passing wires through the brackets of braces, which are commonly used before surgery.

IMF is also used to aid weight loss; various studies from the 1970s and early 1980s used ivy loops and cap splints to wire the jaws together to enforce a liquid diet until such time as sufficient weight loss had been achieved; this was typically around nine months but in one study could be as long as 17 months. It was found that patients typically put much of the weight they had lost back on, and in 1980 a study concluded that it was "a safe but ineffective means of controlling weight". However, a study published in the British Medical Journal in 1981 found that jaw wiring could be effective if aftercare were provided, in this case a nylon cord passed around the patient's waist after weight loss had been achieved, which would remind them if they started to put weight back on. John Garrow, the co-author of that study, defended the practice in a 1999 letter, calling it "a safer and less expensive alternative to gastroplasty" and pointing to his positive results when accompanied with the waist cord.

Conventional jaw wiring for weight loss remains in use in Nigeria and South Africa, though in the latter, dentists are said to perform the procedure reluctantly, as they know it is ineffective but patients say they will find someone else to do it. Contrary to earlier practice, wiring is retained at most for six weeks. The same pattern of weight replenishment after unwiring is observed in Nigeria, although the Nwoga et al (2019) study noted that the reasons for desiring weight loss may have been temporary, e.g. marriage or fitting into a wedding gown.

=== Orthodontic jaw wiring ===
The second type of jaw wiring is called orthodontic jaw wiring (OJW) or dental jaw wiring, and can be used as a treatment for obesity and compulsive overeating. In this procedure, a dentist or orthodontist attaches braces to certain teeth (typically the canines and premolars) and inserts wiring, but not elastics, between the upper and lower teeth in a figure-8 pattern. The wiring is removed periodically to allow the jaw joints to move freely, especially in the vertical direction. The procedure is not invasive and does not require anesthesia.

OJW does not keep the upper and lower teeth in contact. The sole purpose of the wiring is to limit the extent to which the jaws may open. In the resting position, the teeth are parted 2–4 millimeters, with the lips lightly touching. (The ivy loop method used in the study in Nigeria also allows limited jaw movement.) Orthodontic jaw wiring is removed when the patient has achieved their weight loss goals.
