= Food Addicts Anonymous =

Twelve-step program

- Nickname: FAA
- Formation: 1987; 39 years ago
- Founder: Judith C.
- Founded at: West Palm Beach, Florida
- Type: Mutual-help addiction recovery twelve-step program
- Headquarters: Port St. Lucie, Florida
- Website: faacanhelp.org

Food Addicts Anonymous (FAA) is a twelve-step program founded in 1987 that is patterned after the Alcoholics Anonymous program. It is for people with food addictions and is based on the premise that some people are addicted to refined high-carbohydrate foods and need to abstain from those foods in order to avoid overconsumption.

== Overview ==
Food Addicts Anonymous was founded in 1987 in West Palm Beach, Florida, by a founder who calls herself Judith C.

By 2007 there were over 150 weekly meetings around the world in addition to phone and online meetings.

FAA holds that some people are addicted to certain foods and must abstain from them; like other twelve-step programs, FAA members believe that help from a higher power is necessary for them to avoid the substances they crave. The organization has a suggested food plan that calls for abstinence from sugar, flour, and wheat. All sugars, sugar substitutes, and artificial sweeteners are restricted by the plan. All forms of wheat and flour, including flours not made from wheat, are also restricted. Dietary fats are limited. FAA suggests that its members eat a variety of foods at specified intervals and in set proportions and keep track of what they eat.
