= Robert N. Rose =

American cybersecurity expert

Robert N. Rose (born February 27, 1951) is an American Wall Street financier and cybersecurity expert.

Rose is a member of the U.S. Department of Homeland Security's Homeland Security Advisory Council and chair of the Information and Communications Risk Reduction Subcommittee. He was a Clinton Administration appointee to the Fulbright Foreign Scholarship Board.

== Education ==
Rose obtained a BS from the School of Foreign Service at Georgetown University, majoring in international economics. During his studies at Georgetown, he was a member of the Delta Phi Epsilon fraternity. In 1995, Rose received his Master of Public Administration from the Kennedy School of Government at Harvard University.

== Career in finance ==
From 1995 to 2008, Rose was a Senior Managing Director at Bear Stearns, where he was Global Head of Sales and Marketing for PricingDirect and the Financial Analytics and Structured Transactions group.

== Career in cybersecurity ==
Rose has served in various appointed U.S. government advisory positions in the areas of national security, cyber, and homeland security. In 1995, Rose was one of the founding members of the U.S. Secret Service’s Electronic Crime Task Force (ECFT) in New York. He was later appointed to the U.S. Department of State’s International Security Advisory Board (ISAB).

Rose was invited by the Aspen Security Forum to speak on “Cyber Power and Cyber-Security.” He also played a critical role in the 2012 establishment of the George Washington University Center for Cyber and Homeland Security.

== Political work ==
Rose has been a longtime Democratic Party fundraiser and activist. He was a co-founder of the National Jewish Democratic Council in 1990, and in 1992, he was appointed to Democratic National Convention Site Selection Committee and was a member of New York 1992 Convention Host Executive Committee. In 2000, he was a member DNC National Convention Rules Committee. Rose was an Alternate Delegate for the 2004 Democratic National Convention held in Boston. He also served as Finance Chairman of the Democratic Party of Connecticut in 1993.

== Publications ==
- Co-authored, "Final Report of the Emerging Technologies Subcommittee Biotechnology,” U.S. Department of Homeland Security (August 18, 2020)
- Co-authored, “Final Report of the Emerging Technologies Subcommittee Unmanned Aerial and Ground Based Systems,” U.S. Department of Homeland Security (February 24, 2020)
- Co-authored, “Final Report of the Emerging Technologies Subcommittee 3-D Printing,” U.S. Department of Homeland Security (February 24, 2020)
- Co-authored, “Final Report of Cybersecurity Subcommittee: State, Local, Tribal & Territorial,” U.S. Department of Homeland Security (November 14, 2019)
- Co-authored, “Final Report of the Emerging Technologies Subcommittee Artificial Intelligence / Machine Learning,” U.S. Department of Homeland Security (November 14, 2019)
- “Restructuring the U.S. Intelligence Community”, Center for Cyber and Homeland Security, George Washington University (June 2017)
- Co-authored “Report on Arctic Policy,” U.S. Department of State (September 21, 2016)
- “The Future of Insider Threats,” Forbes Online (August 30, 2016)
- “A Practical Path to Cybersecurity,” Forbes Online (December 22, 2015)
- Co-authored “A Framework for International Cyber Stability,” U.S. Department of State (July 2, 2014)
- Co-authored “Defer Capital Gains. Don’t Cut the Tax,” op-ed article published in the New York Times, October 18, 1992. Article cited in Forbes magazine (January 18, 1993)
