= Georg Emanuel Opiz =

German painter and graphic artist

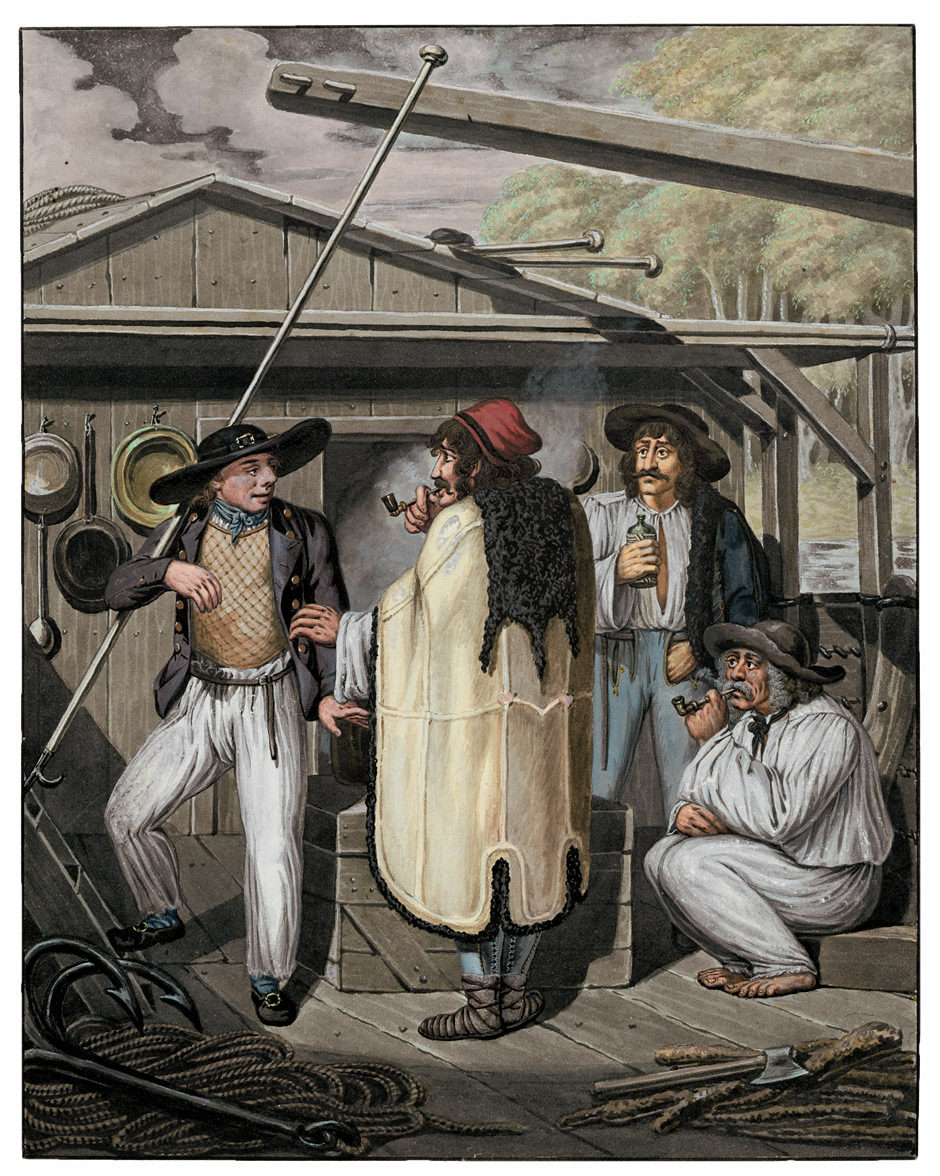
Danube Boatmen on Their Barge

Georg Emanuel Opiz (4 April 1775 – 12 July 1841) was a Bohemian German painter and graphic artist. He also wrote some now-forgotten historical novels, under the pseudonym "Bohemus".

== Biography ==
He was born in Prague. His father, Johann Ferdinand Opiz (1741–1812), was a tax official who also worked as a writer and magazine editor, and carried on a correspondence with Giacomo Casanova. His mother, Louise Philippine, was a great niece of the explorer, Engelbert Kaempfer. His brother was the botanist, Philipp Maximilian Opiz.

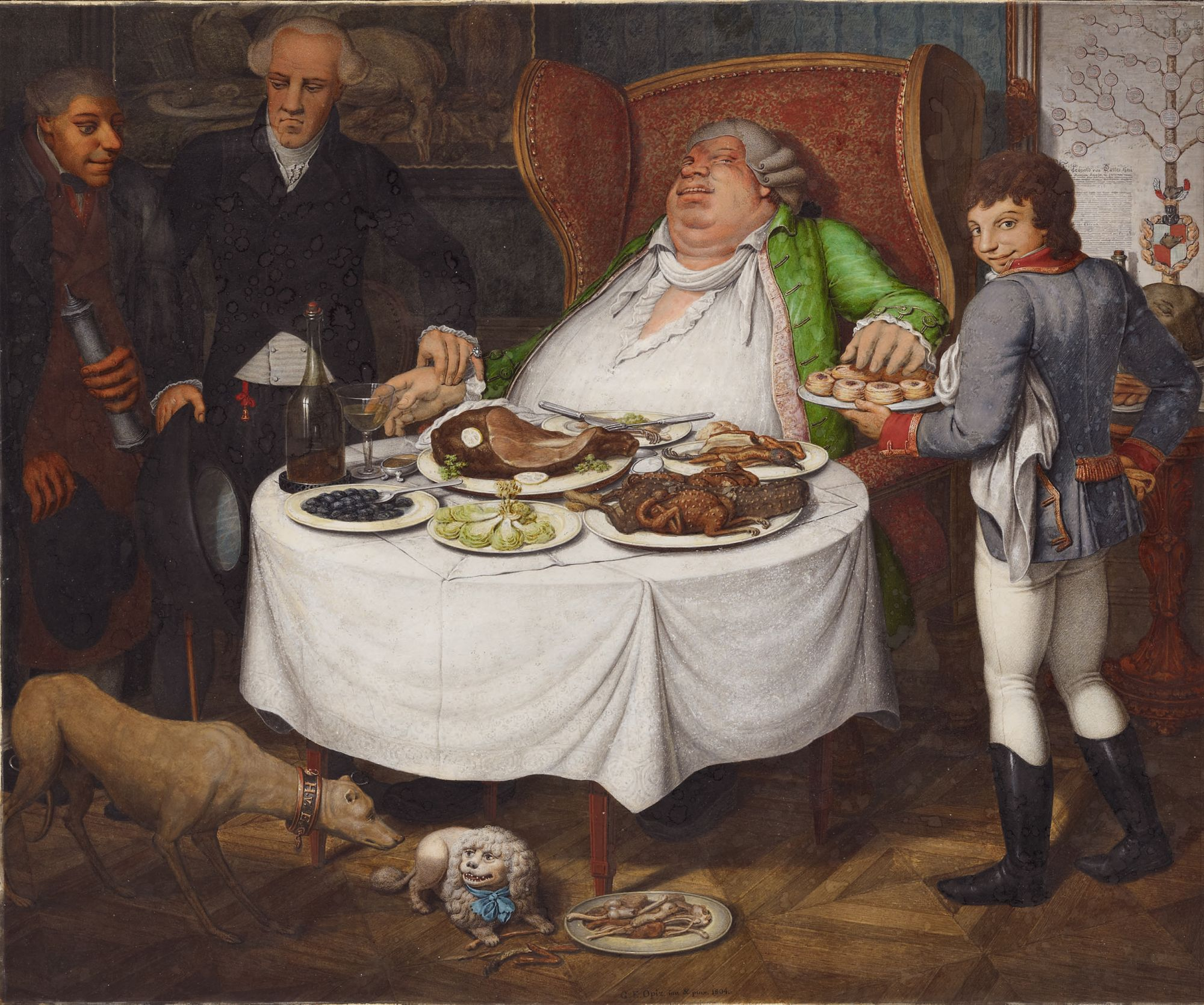
The Glutton

After completing his secondary education in Prague, he took a law degree, while studying drawing and painting in his spare time. In 1793, he continued those studies at the Dresden Academy of Fine Arts, where his primary instructor was Giovanni Battista Casanova, Giacomo's brother.

In 1798, he made his living by painting the wealthy guests at the spa in Karlsbad. Around 1800, he was in Hamburg and Bremen then, from 1801 to 1803, in Vienna. It was there he created his Scenes from the Street and Folk Life of Franciscan Vienna (a reference to Emperor Francis I). Some of these were made into etchings by Kilian Ponheimer, among others, and established his reputation as a genre artist. His style was influenced by William Hogarth and Daniel Chodowiecki.

In 1805, Opiz and his wife settled in Leipzig, where he produced portrait miniatures. In 1814, following the War of the Sixth Coalition, he went to Paris to create and sell etchings related to the Coalition's victory. He apparently remained there until 1817, when he returned to Leipzig and created a series of etchings on life in Paris, published by F. A. Brockhaus. From 1818 to 1830, he worked as an engraver for the magazine Urania, also published by Brockhaus. Numerous erotic etchings have been attributed to him.

His major publication, Character Scenes from Life in Paris, with twenty-four colored etchings, appeared in 1819. During the 1820s, he produced watercolors which suggest that he visited Russia and the Ottoman Empire. In the latter part of the 1820s, he became a Professor at the Hochschule für Grafik und Buchkunst Leipzig. During this period, his well-known Leipziger Messe Scenes were published in Dresden. Opiz died in Leipzig in 1841.

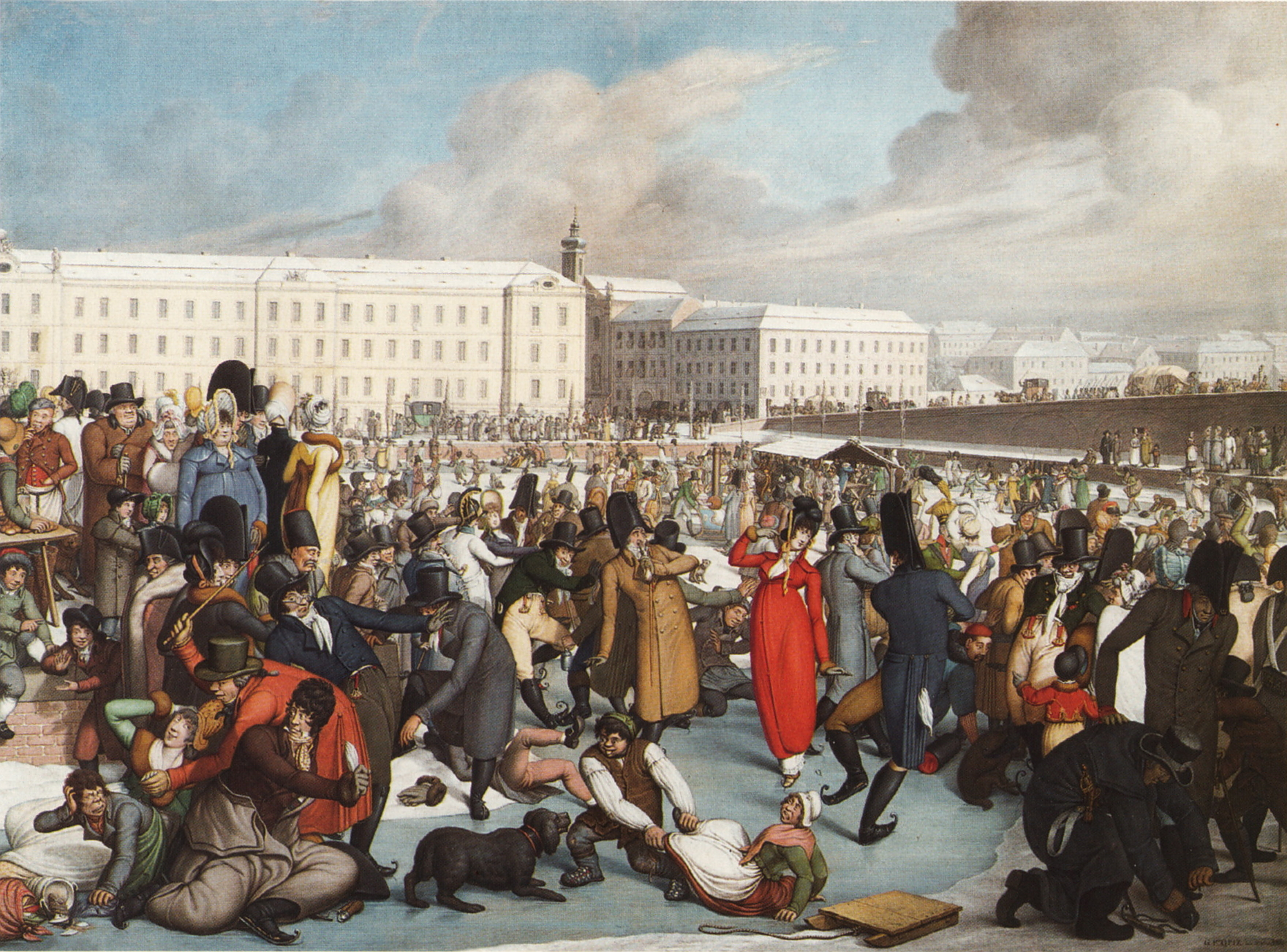
The Ice Rink near the Stubentor
