= PEERtrainer =

Weight loss social networking website

PEERtrainer, Inc
- Company type: Private
- Founded: August 2004
- Headquarters: New York, New York, U.S.
- Key people: Habib Wicks, Founder; Jacqueline Wicks, Founder
- Services: Weight Loss
- Website: www.peertrainer.com

PEERtrainer is a social networking website that aims to help people lose weight. It is based on the idea that social support is the most important factor in weight loss. Development on the website began in August 2004; it was launched in October 2005. The potential of the company's health oriented social networking platform has generated interest from leading healthcare firms. PEERtrainer's says its membership has reached more than 900,000 since its launch in 2005.

== Groups ==
PEERtrainer's social support network centers around four-person user groups with common interests. The website is used as a way to reinforce habits among members by facilitating peer-to-peer support within these groups. Some individuals that take part in other dieting programs, such as Weight Watchers, have begun to integrate PEERtrainer's online support groups to help them stay on track.

== Media coverage ==
In May, 2007, a PEERtrainer member was pictured on the cover of People for her weight loss success story, and featured on Good Morning America. The company was ranked "Best in Class" in the Health category of the SEOmoz 2007 Web 2.0 Awards and written about by The New York Times. The NBC San Francisco Bay Area affiliate TV show TechNow! aired its segment on PEERtrainer in May, 2006.
