= Robert Hugh Rose =

American dietitian, physician and writer (1876–1960)

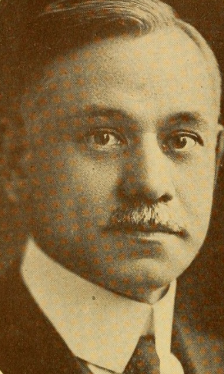
- Rose in 1918
- Born: January 24, 1876; Carthage, Missouri, US
- Died: August 15, 1960 (aged 84); New York City, US
- Occupations: Dietitian, physician, writer

Robert Hugh Rose (January 24, 1876 – August 15, 1960) was an American dietitian, physician, and writer.

== Biography ==
Rose was born on January 24, 1876, in Carthage, Missouri. Rose graduated from DePauw University in 1898. He obtained his M.D. from College of Physicians and Surgeons, New York in 1902. He practiced medicine in New York City.

Rose was one of the first to advocate counting calories as a method to lose weight. He proposed this in his book Eat Your Way to Health, published in 1916. In the second edition, he described the method as a "scientific system of weight control". Rose proposed the counting calories method for weight loss two years before Lulu Hunt Peters published Diet & Health: With Key to the Calories. He also argued that diet determined the size and shape of people.

Rose's book Eat Your Way to Health was positively reviewed in medical journals.

Rose died on August 15, 1960, aged 84, in New York City.

== Selected publications ==
- The Maintenance Diet for Adults (New York Medical Journal, 1915)
- Weight Increase (New York Medical Journal, 1915)
- Weight Reduction (New York Medical Journal, 1915)
- Eat Your Way To Health (1916, 1924)
- Weight, Diet and Efficiency (New York Medical Journal, 1920)
- Acid Gastritis (New York Medical Journal, 1921)
- How To Stay Young (1933, 1940)
