= Binge eating =

Pattern characterized by disorderly eating foods in every life activity

- Specialty: Psychiatry
- Symptoms: Eating addiction

Binge eating is a pattern of disordered eating that consists of episodes of uncontrollable eating. It is a common symptom of eating disorders such as binge eating disorder and bulimia nervosa. During such binges, a person rapidly consumes an excessive quantity of food. A diagnosis of binge eating is associated with feelings of loss of control. Binge eating disorder is also linked with being overweight and obesity.

== Diagnosis ==
The DSM-5 includes a disorder diagnosis criterion for Binge Eating Disorder (BED). It is as follows:

- Recurrent and persistent episodes of binge eating
- Binge eating episodes are associated with three (or more) of the following:
  - Eating much more rapidly than normal
  - Eating until feeling uncomfortably full
  - Eating large amounts of food when not physically hungry
  - Eating alone because of being embarrassed by how much one is eating
  - Feeling disgusted with oneself, depressed, or very guilty after overeating
- Marked distress regarding binge eating
- Absence of regular compensatory behaviors (such as purging)

== Warning signs ==
Typical warning signs of binge eating disorder could include the disappearance of a large quantity of food in a relatively short period of time. A person who may be experiencing binge eating disorder may appear to be uncomfortable when eating around others or in public. A person may develop new and extreme eating patterns that they have never done before. These might include diets that cut out certain food groups completely such as a no dairy or no carb diet. Binge eating can begin after a first attempt at dieting. They might also steal or hoard food in unusual places. A person may be experiencing fluctuations in their weight. In addition, they may have feelings of disgust, depression, or guilt about overeating. Another possible warning sign of binge eating is that a person may be obsessed with their body image or weight.

Furthermore, patients who binge eat may also engage in other self-destructing behaviours like suicide attempts, drug use, shop-lifting, and drinking too much alcohol. The onset of binge eating without dieting is linked to a higher risk of mental health issues and a younger age of onset. BED patients can experience comorbid psychiatric instability.

== Causes ==
There are no direct causes of binge eating; however, long-term dieting, psychological issues and an obsession with body image have been linked to binge eating. There are multiple factors that increase a person's risk of developing binge eating disorder. Family history could play a role if that person had a family member who was affected by binge eating. Said person may not have a supportive or friendly home environment, and they have a hard time expressing their problems with BED. Having a history of going on extreme diets may cause an urge to binge eat. Psychological issues such as feeling negatively about oneself or the way they look may trigger a binge.

Weight stigma has also been found to predict binge eating, highlighting the importance of weight inclusive approaches to binge eating disorder that do not exercerbate this potential cause.

== Health risks ==
There are several physical, emotional, and social health risks associated with binge eating disorder. These risks include depression, anxiety, and heart disease.

One study found that people with obesity who experience binge eating have a higher body mass index, and higher levels of depression and stress than those who did not have with binge eating disorder Exposure to two major categories of risk factors—those that raise the risk for obesity and those that raise the risk for psychiatric disorders in general—can be associated with binge eating disorder.

== Effects ==
Typically, the eating is done rapidly, and a person will feel emotionally numb and unable to stop eating. Most people who have eating binges try to hide this behavior from others, and often feel ashamed about being overweight or depressed about their overeating. Although people who do not have any eating disorder may occasionally experience episodes of overeating, frequent binge eating is often a symptom of an eating disorder.

BED is characterized by uncontrollable, excessive eating, followed by feelings of shame and guilt. Unlike those with bulimia, those with BED symptoms typically do not purge their food, fast, or excessively exercise to compensate for binges. Additionally, these individuals tend to diet more often, enroll in weight-control programs and have a history of family obesity. However, many who have bulimia also have binge-eating disorder.

Along with the social and physical health that is affected when suffering from BED, there are psychiatric disorders that are often linked to BED. Some of them being but are not limited to: depression, bipolar disorder, anxiety disorder, substance abuse/use disorder.

== Treatments ==
Current treatments for binge eating disorder mainly consist of psychological therapies, such as Cognitive Behavioural Therapy (CBT), Interpersonal Psychotherapy (IPT), and Dialectical Behavioural Therapy (DBT). A study conducted on the long term efficacy of psychological treatments for binge eating showed that both cognitive behavioral therapy (CBT) and group interpersonal psychotherapy (IPT) effectively treat binge eating disorder, with 64.4% of patients completely recovering from binge eating.

Lisdexamfetamine dimesylate, also known as Vyvanse, is the only medication approved by the Food and Drug Administration (FDA) for the treatment of moderate-to-severe binge eating disorder in adults as of 2024. However, some studies have called into question its effectiveness for this indication.

== History ==
=== APA DSM ===
The American Psychiatric Association mentioned and listed binge eating under the listed criteria and features of bulimia in the Diagnostic and Statistical Manual of Mental Disorders (DSM) - 3 in 1987. By including binge eating in the DSM-3, even if not on its own as a separate eating disorder, they brought awareness to the disorder and gave it mental disorder legitimacy. This allowed for people to receive the appropriate treatment for binge eating and for their disorder to be legitimized.

=== Drug therapy ===
In January 2015, the Food and Drug Administration (FDA) approved lisdexamfetamine dimesylate (Vyvanse), the first medication indicated for the treatment of moderate-to-severe binge eating disorder.

== Men with binge eating ==
Men with binge eating often face unique barriers to seeking treatment due to socio-cultural expectations surrounding masculinity. After men compare their bodies to the culturally constructed masculine ideals, they often develop heightened concerns about their own body image and internalize the belief that their bodies should be muscular, lean, and strong, developing unhealthy behaviors like binge eating or using fad diets. Many men hesitate to reach out for help out of fear of appearing weak, 'less like a man' or even homosexual. The pervasive stereotype that eating disorders primarily affect women has contributed to feelings of shame and isolation among men who are affected by these disorders. This gender-based stigma surrounding eating disorders and strongly feminine branding of eating disorder treatment centers create a significant barrier to men's willingness to reach out for support. Men are more likely to partake in compulsive or excessive exercising as a compensation to highly calorific diets, leading to body dysmorphia.

== See also ==
- Binge drinking
- Binge eating disorder
- Cognitive behavioral treatment of eating disorders
- Counterregulatory eating
- Overeating
- Polyphagia
- Prader-Willi Syndrome
