= Women in Mauritania =

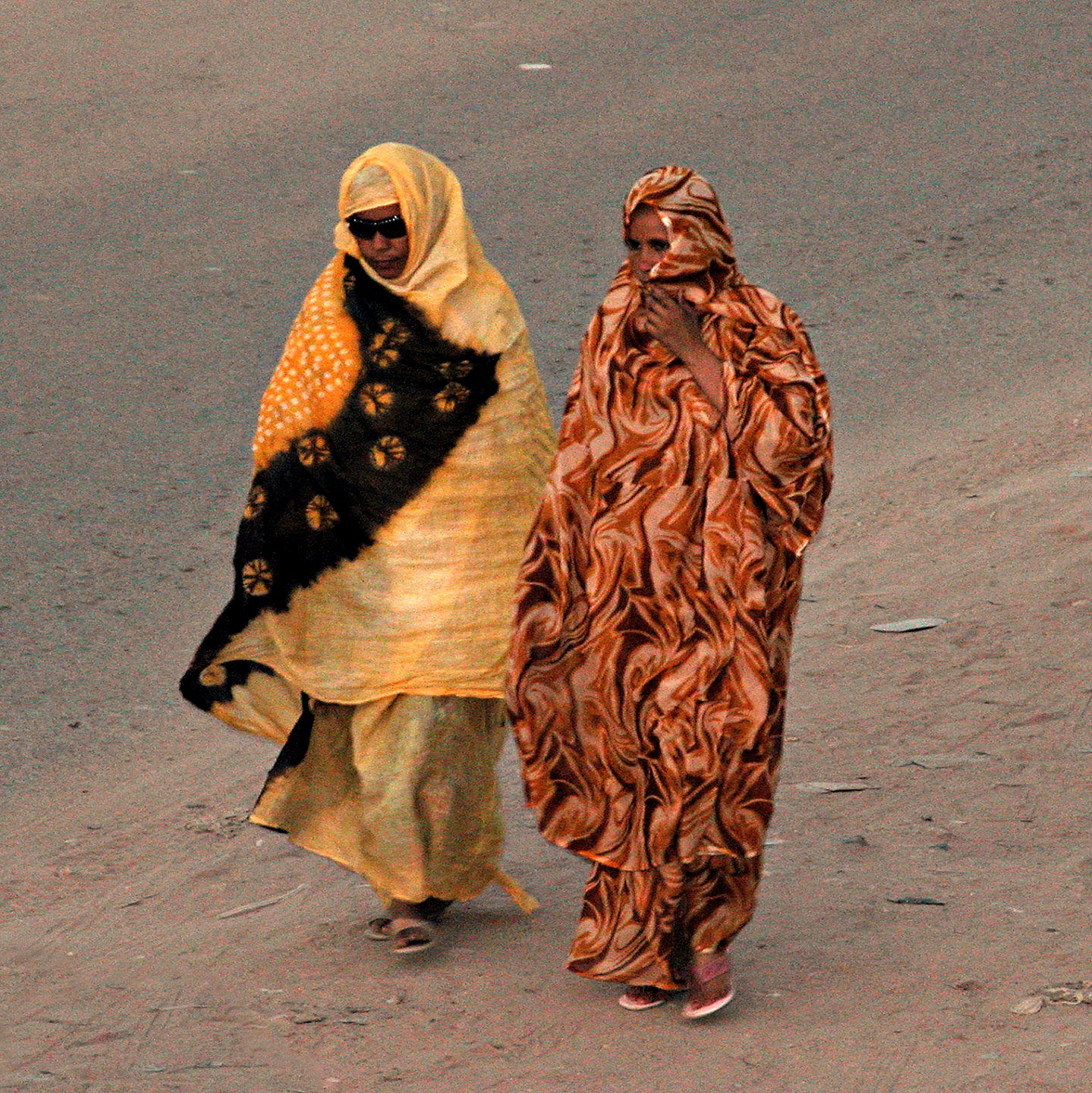
- Women in Atar, Mauritania, 2006

General statistics
- Maternal mortality (per 100,000): 510 (2010)
- Women in parliament: 25% (2017)
- Women over 25 with secondary education: 8.0% (2010)
- Women in labour force: 32% (2017)

Gender Inequality Index
- Value: 0.632 (2021)
- Rank: 161st out of 191

Global Gender Gap Index
- Value: 0.606 (2021)
- Rank: 145th out of 156

Issues impacting Women in Mauritanian society include female genital mutilation, child marriage, and polygamy.

The practice of Leblouh (Arabic: البلوح, romanized: lə-blūḥ) is the practice of force-feeding girls from as young as five, through to teenagers, in Mauritania, Western Sahara, and southern Morocco, where obesity is traditionally regarded as being desirable.

Older women called "fatteners" force the young girls to consume enormous quantities of food and liquid, inflicting pain on them if they do not eat and drink. One way of inflicting pain is to pinch a limb between two sticks. A six-year-old girl might typically be forced to drink 20 litres (4.4 imp gal; 5.3 US gal) of camel's milk, and eat two kilos of pounded millet mixed with two cups of butter, every day. Although the practice is abusive, mothers claim there is no other way to secure a good future for their children.

The practice goes back to the 11th century, and has been reported to have made a significant comeback in Mauritania after a military junta took over Mauritania in 2008.

== Demographics ==
As of July 2016, the estimated population of Mauritania is 3,677,293 people. The median age of Mauritanian women is 21.4 years. Life expectancy at birth is 65.4 years. The ethnic groups are: black Moors 40%, white Moors 30%, sub-Saharan Mauritanians 30%. All the population practices Islam (see Religion in Mauritania). Urbanization is 53.7%.

== Education ==
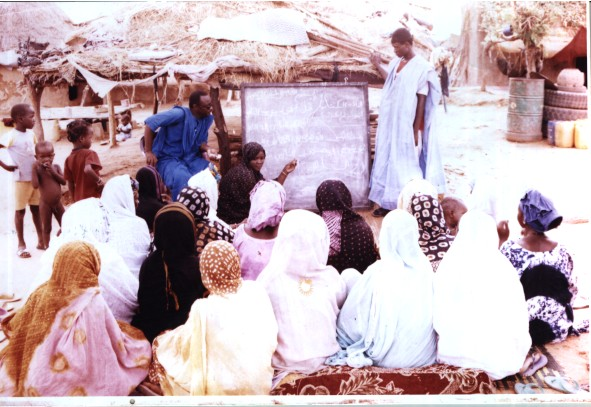
Adult alphabetization courses in Mauritania

Education in Mauritania was strongly influenced by the French educational system. Girls' education is still valued less than boys', and women's literacy rate (age 15 and over) is lower than that of men: in 2015, the female literacy rate was 41.6%, compared to the male rate of 62.6%.

== Women's rights ==
=== Child marriage ===
In 2017, 37% of girls in Mauritania were married before they turn 18 years old. 14% of girls are married before they turn 15.

=== Polygamy ===
Polygamy is legal in Mauritania. A man can marry up to four women, but must obtain the consent of his existing wife/wives first. Polygamy is common within the Afro-Mauritanian and Berber Moorish population, occurring less frequently among the Arab Moorish population.

A 2007 MICS3 reports that 10.7% of women aged 15–49 are in a polygamous union.

=== Female genital mutilation ===
This map shows the % of women and girls aged 15-49 years who have undergone FGM/C. Source: UNICEF (2013). Grey countries were not surveyed.

Female genital mutilation is prevalent in Mauritania. 71% of all women aged between 15 and 49 had undergone FGM in 2001. A 2007 demographic cluster study found no change in FGM prevalence rate in Mauritania. Type II FGM is most frequent. About 57% of Mauritania women believe FGM is a religious requirement.

Mauritania is 100% Muslim. The FGM prevalence rate varies by ethnic groups: 92% of Soninke women are cut, and about 70% of Fulbe and Moorish women. 28% of Wolof women have undergone FGM.

Mauritania has consented to international charters such as CEDAW as well as Africa's Maputo Protocol. Ordonnance n°2005-015 on child protection restricts FGM.

=== Force feeding ===
Leblouh is the practice of force-feeding girls from as young as five, through to teenagers, in Mauritania, Western Sahara, and southern Morocco, where obesity is traditionally regarded as being desirable. Especially prevalent in rural areas and having its roots in Tuareg tradition, leblouh is practiced to increase chances of marriage in a society where high body volume used to be a sign of wealth. The synonym gavage comes from the French term for the force-feeding of geese to produce foie gras.

The practice goes back to the 11th century, and has been reported to have made a significant comeback in Mauritania after a military junta took over Mauritania in 2008.

== Slavery ==
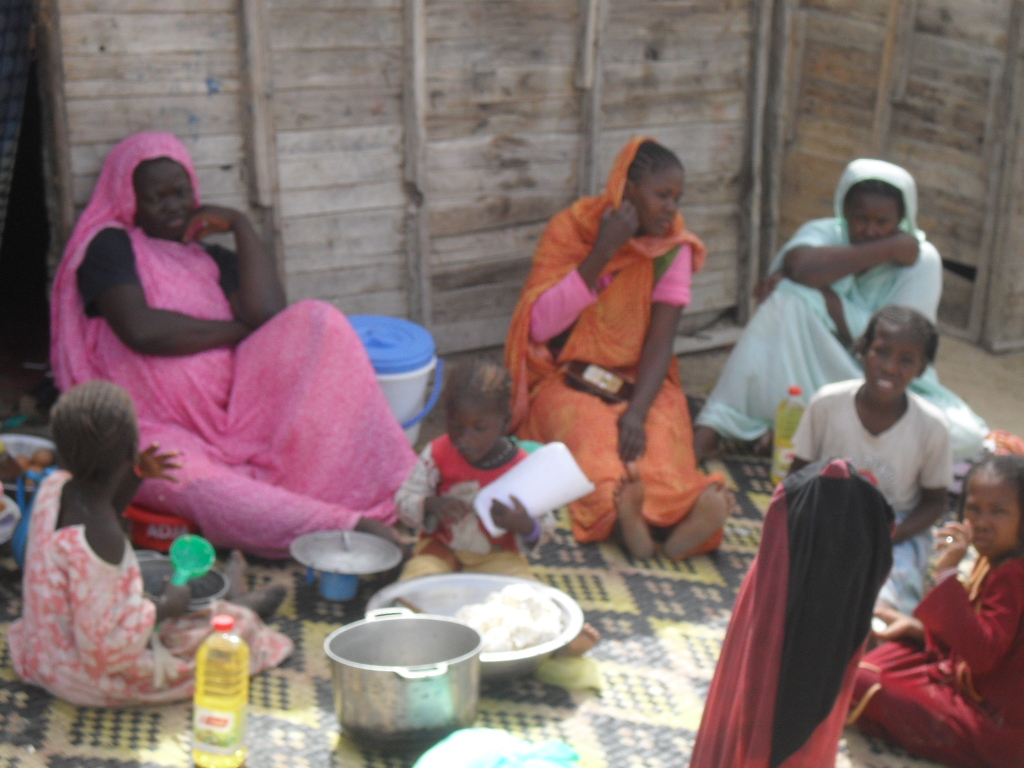
Women descended from slaves experience significant hardship in Mauritania.

Women who descend from slaves experience significant hardship in Mauritania. Slavery has been called "deeply rooted" in the structure of Mauritania, and "closely tied" to the ethnic composition of the country.

In 1905, an end of slavery in Mauritania was declared by the colonial French administration but the vastness of Mauritania mostly gave the law very few successes.

In 1981, Mauritania became the last country in the world to abolish slavery, when a Presidential decree abolished the practice. However, no criminal laws were passed to enforce the ban.

In 2007, "under international pressure", the government passed a law allowing slaveholders to be prosecuted.

== See also ==
- Women in Africa
