= Obesity and sexuality =

Influence of obesity on sexuality

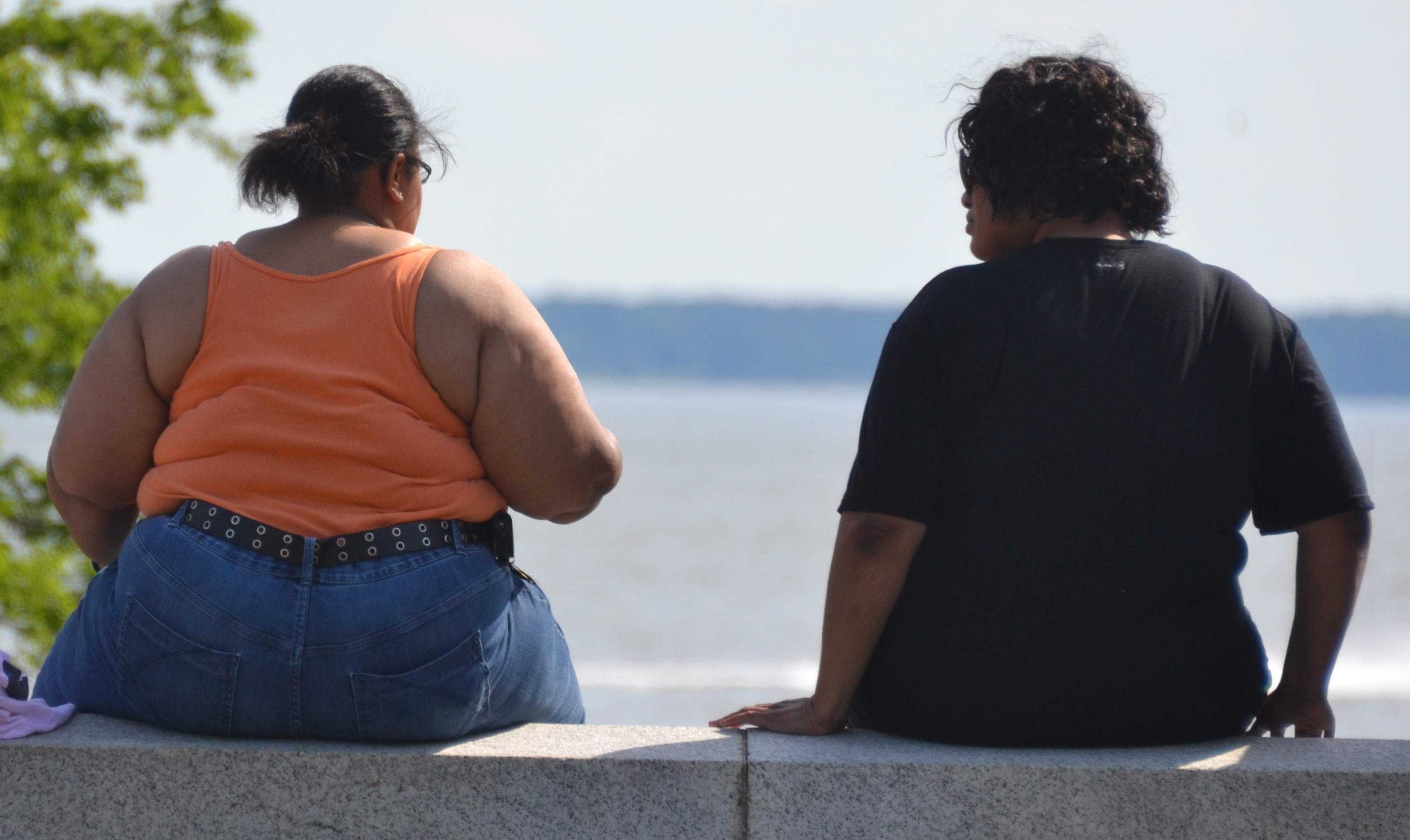
Being obese can influence someone in their sexual life in significant ways.

Being overweight or obese has influence on the sexuality of people in various different aspects. It can include negative aspects such as stigmatization which can be an obstacle for romantic developments, sexual dysfunction and an increased chance of risky sexual behavior. It can also have positive aspects in the form of fat fetishism.

== Background ==
The number of people with obesity has greatly increased in recent decades.

== Childhood and puberty ==
Childhood obesity is correlated to early puberty. Girls who go through puberty earlier are more likely to be sexually active than other girls of the same age and are more likely to become pregnant and contract STDs. In their teen years, increased weight can also lead to obstacles for romantic developments. A 2005 study showed that "a teenage girl’s odds for a romantic relationship… dropped 6 to 7 percent for every 1-point increase in her body mass index." Gay, bisexual and transgender children are more likely to be obese, according to a 2020 study. The root cause for this is unknown.

== Stigma ==
Being obese or overweight is stigmatized. In 2007, Substantia Jones started The Adipositivity Project, which is an annual nude photography series depicting fat couples in a positive way to reduce the stigma.

== Dating and relationships ==
For many, the stigma in dating remains even after having lost weight, also due to fear of gaining weight again. According to psychology professor David Sarwer, the prevailing belief is that people who have never been obese are better able to control their weight. Sex educator Laura Delarato noted that there is fetishization of fat bodies. Some dating sites exclusively for fat people have been made. BMI is highly correlated between romantic partners.

== Sexual health and satisfaction ==
An increased body weight can lead to an increase in sex hormone-binding globulin, which causes testosterone to fail. That can cause the libido to decrease. It can also narrow down the blood vessels, which makes it harder to climax. Sex positions tend to be more limited.

=== Men ===
In men, it can lead to erectile dysfunction.

=== Women ===
Women in class 3 obesity experience the most impairment in sexual quality of life, with an overall lack of enjoyment of sexual activity. In women, it generally leads to low self-esteem and negative self image.

== Fat fetishism ==
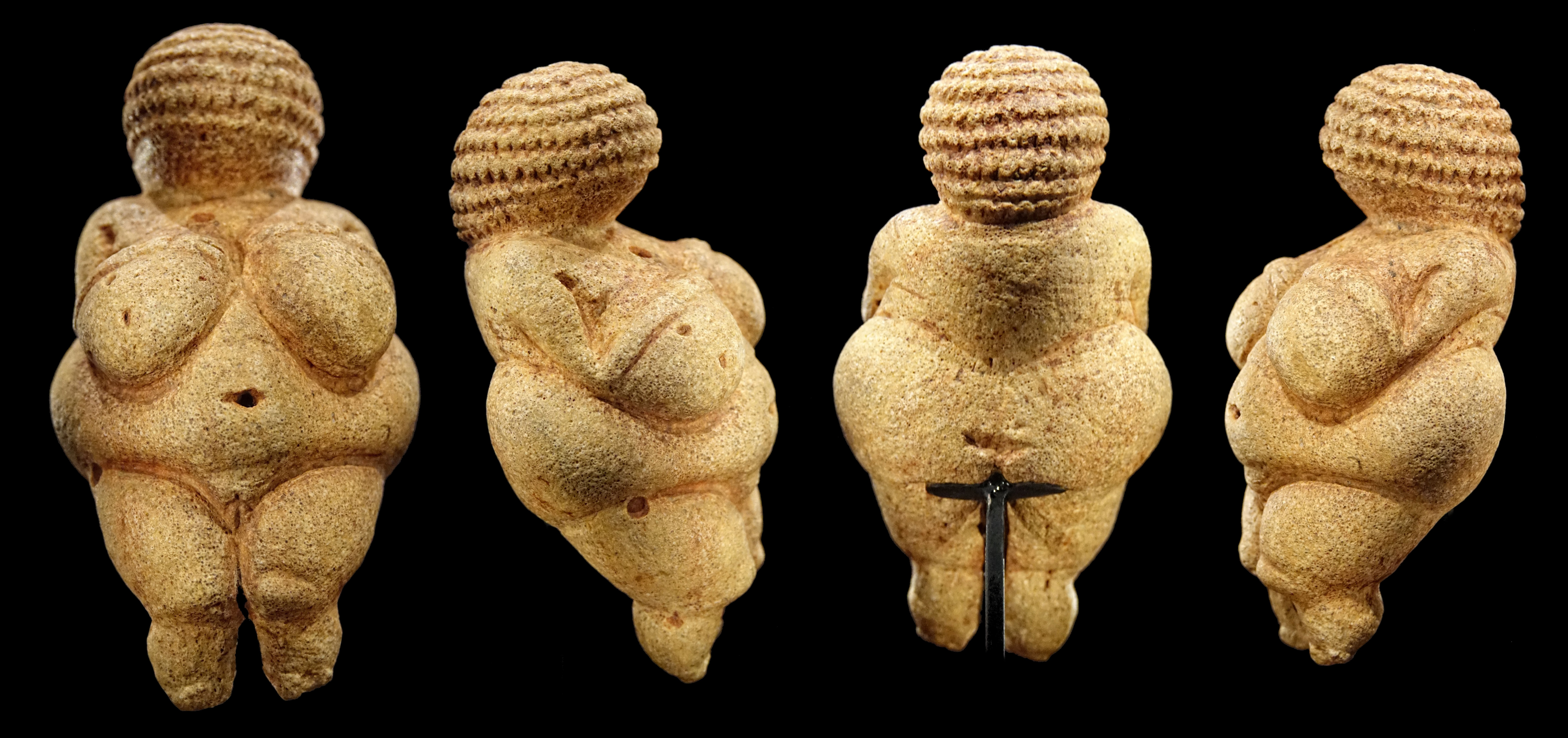
Many anthropologists believe the Venus of Willendorf may have been used to represent a fertility goddess.

Fat fetishism (and "feederism") has been described as a sexual subculture, sexual fetish and a lifestyle.

Some people consider feederism to be a part of BDSM, because food is used as a means of control because the feeder decides what the feedee eats and how much their body changes. Some fat people do happily engage in the fetishism and find fulfillment in it. Many have felt fetishism thrust on them without consent. Aubrey Gordon has rejected the notion that fat attraction is necessarily a fetish. Feederism has been depicted in films like Feed and City Island, where the first was not consensual but the latter was.

=== Pornography and sex work ===
Web queries on Internet pornography websites for 'fat' outpaced 'skinny'. As a 33 stone woman, Amanda Faye has been able to make a living out of eating for the camera.

=== Leblouh ===
Leblouh is the practice of force-feeding women.
