= Marocaine Mosque =

Mosque in Nouakchott, Mauritania

- Arabic: مسجد المغرب
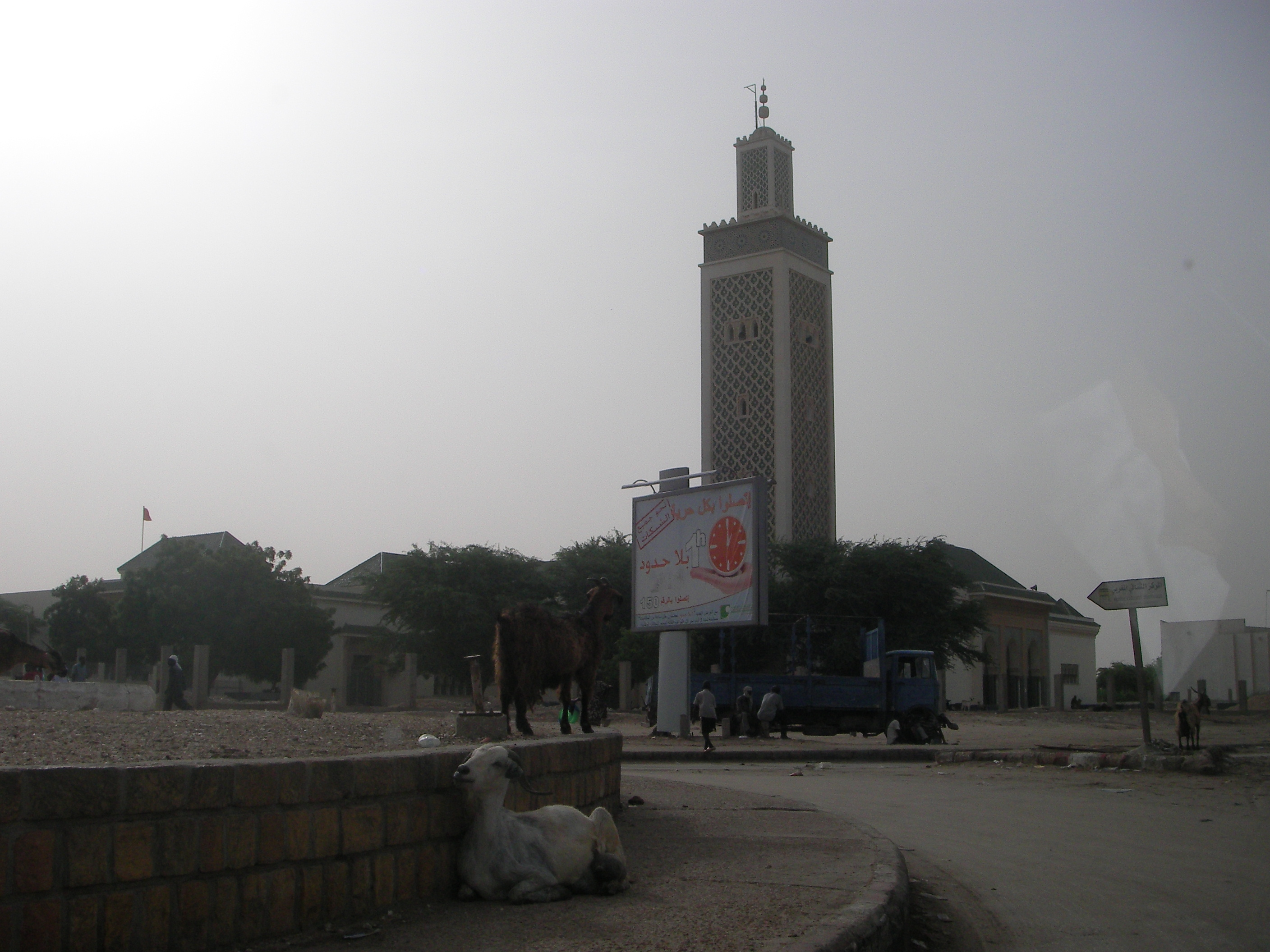
- The mosque in 2008

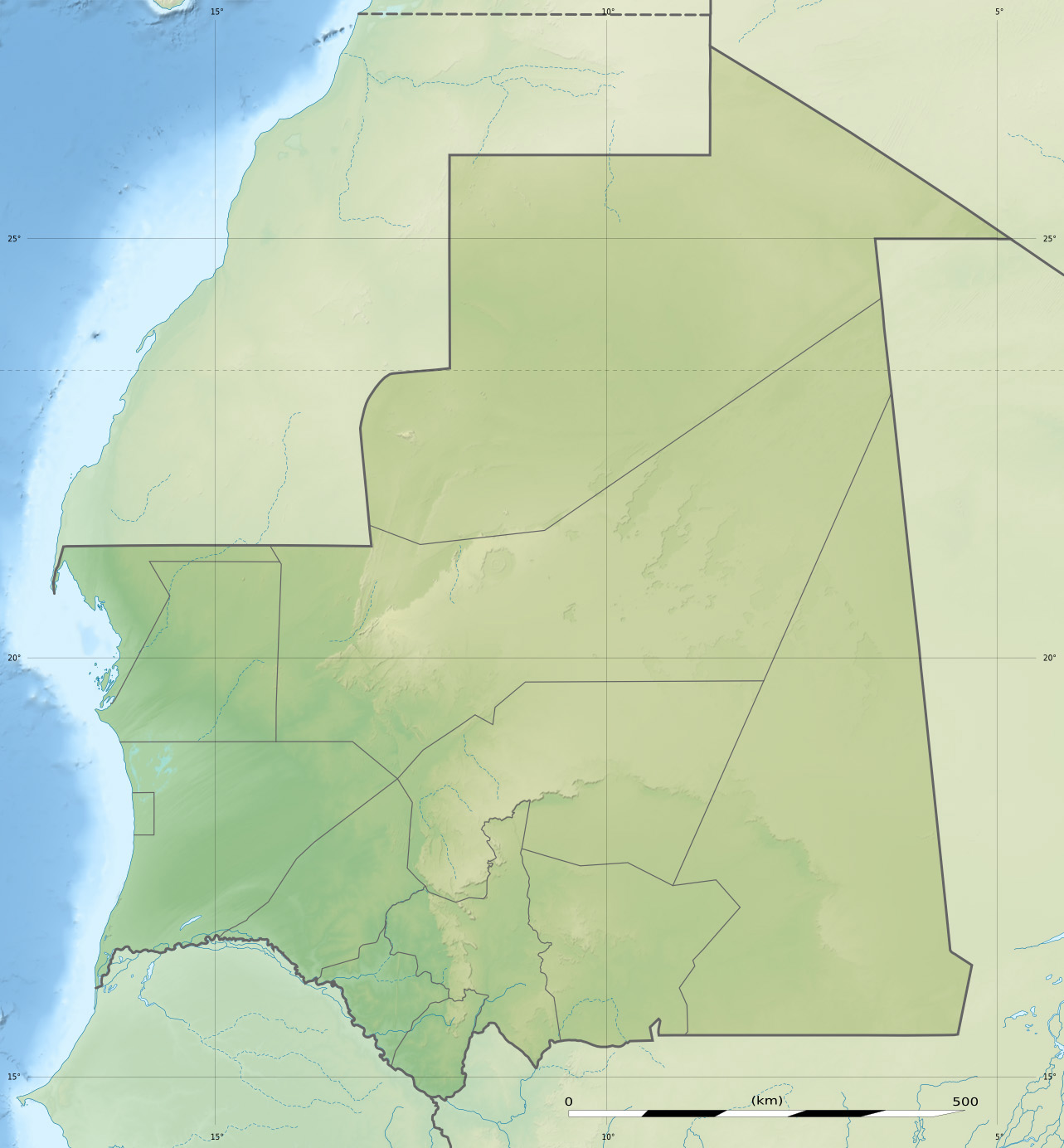
- Location of the mosque in Mauritania

Religion
- Affiliation: Sunni Islam
- Ecclesiastical or organisational status: Mosque
- Status: Active

Location
- Location: Nouakchott
- Country: Mauritania
- Coordinates: 18°4′38″N 15°58′53″W

Architecture
- Type: Mosque architecture

Specifications
- Minaret: One
- Minaret height: 55 m (180 ft)

The Marocaine Mosque (Arabic: مسجد المغرب; French: Mosquée Marocaine), also known as the Grande Mosquée de La Capitale, is a Sunni Islam mosque in the south central part of Nouakchott, Mauritania. It is located south of Ould Abas Mosque, near the Marocaine Market and next to the Moroccan Cultural Centre.

== Overview ==
The mosque's 55 m (180 ft)-high minaret is detailed with intricate Islamic mosaic ornamentation shapes in white, blue and greenish colors. At the top of the minaret is an iron rod ending with the hilal. Adjoining the mosque is an education center where the imams and other religious leaders gather for lessons. It is unknown when the mosque was built.

== Gallery ==
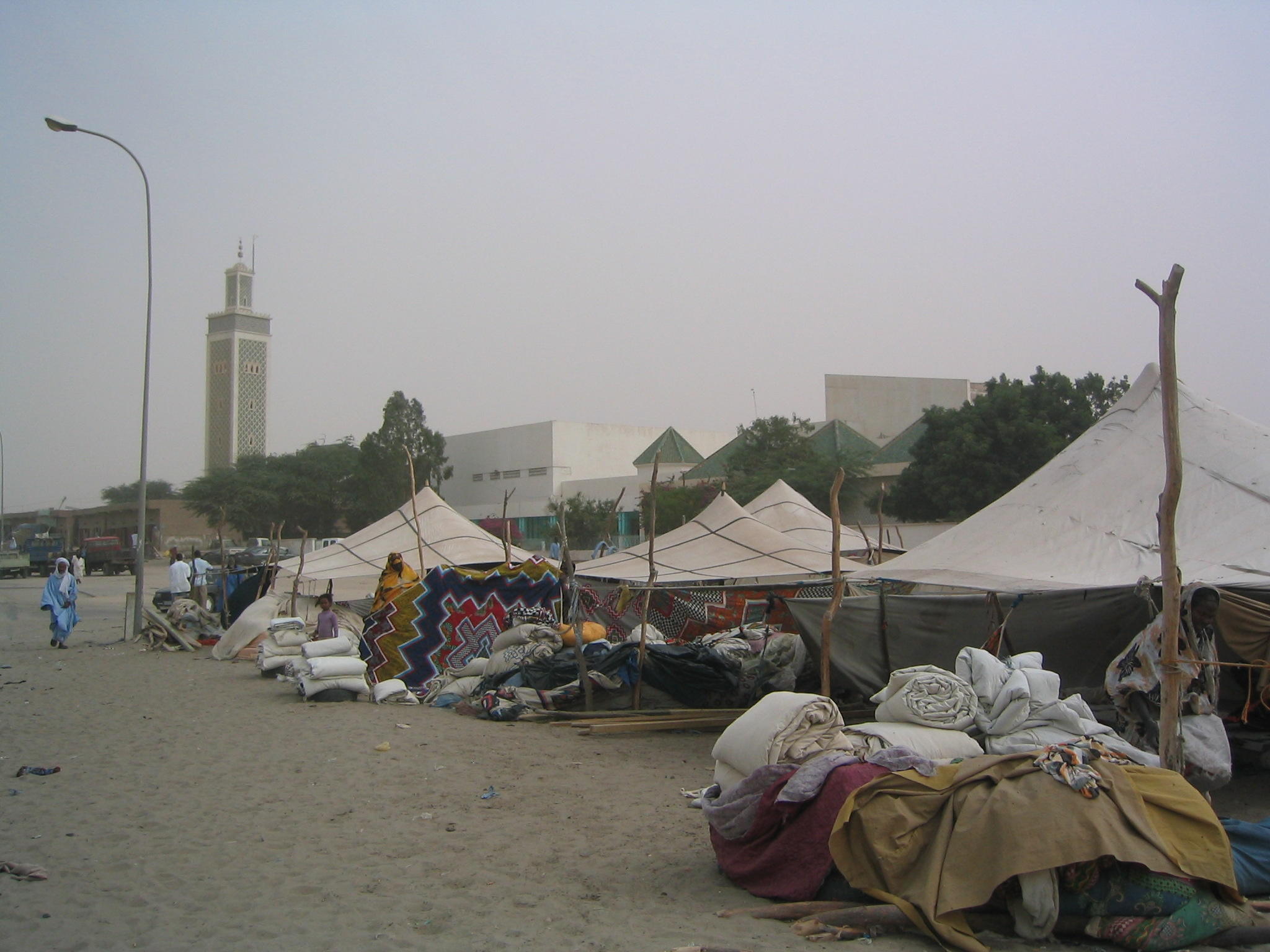
Minaret of Mosque Marocaine and market

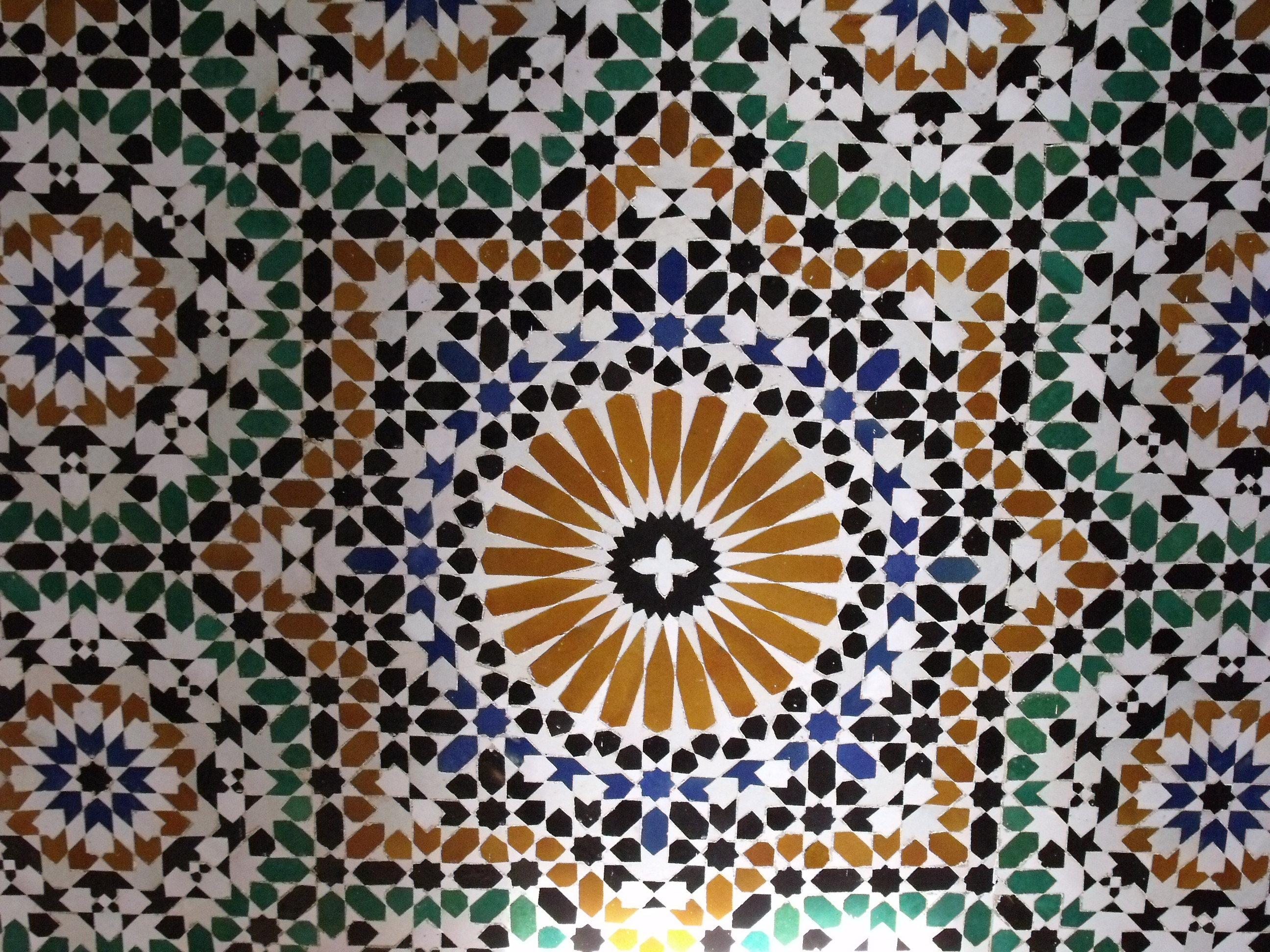
Mosaic detail on the mosque interior

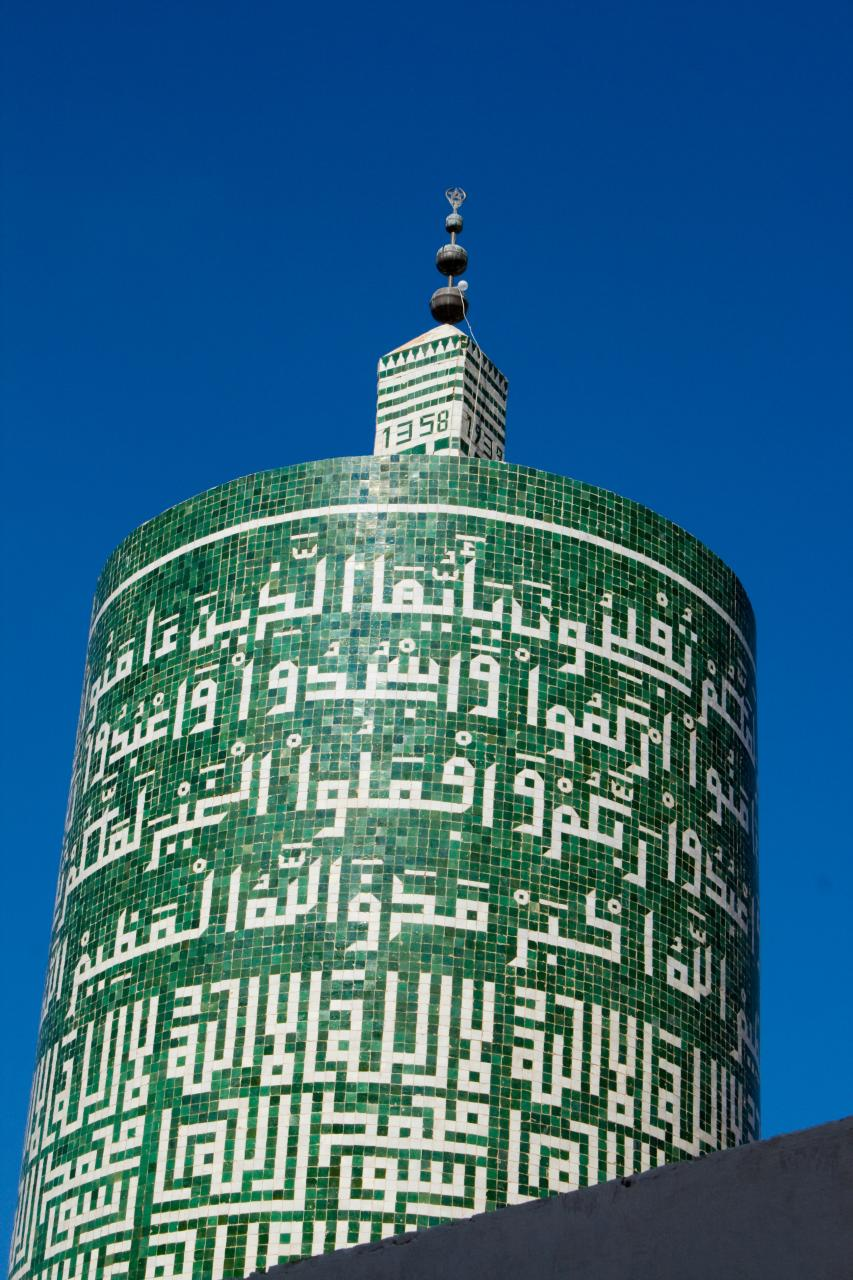
Mosaic detail on the mosque minaret exterior

== See also ==
- Islam in Mauritania
- List of mosques in Mauritania
