= Fat fetishism =

Sexual attraction to overweight or obese people

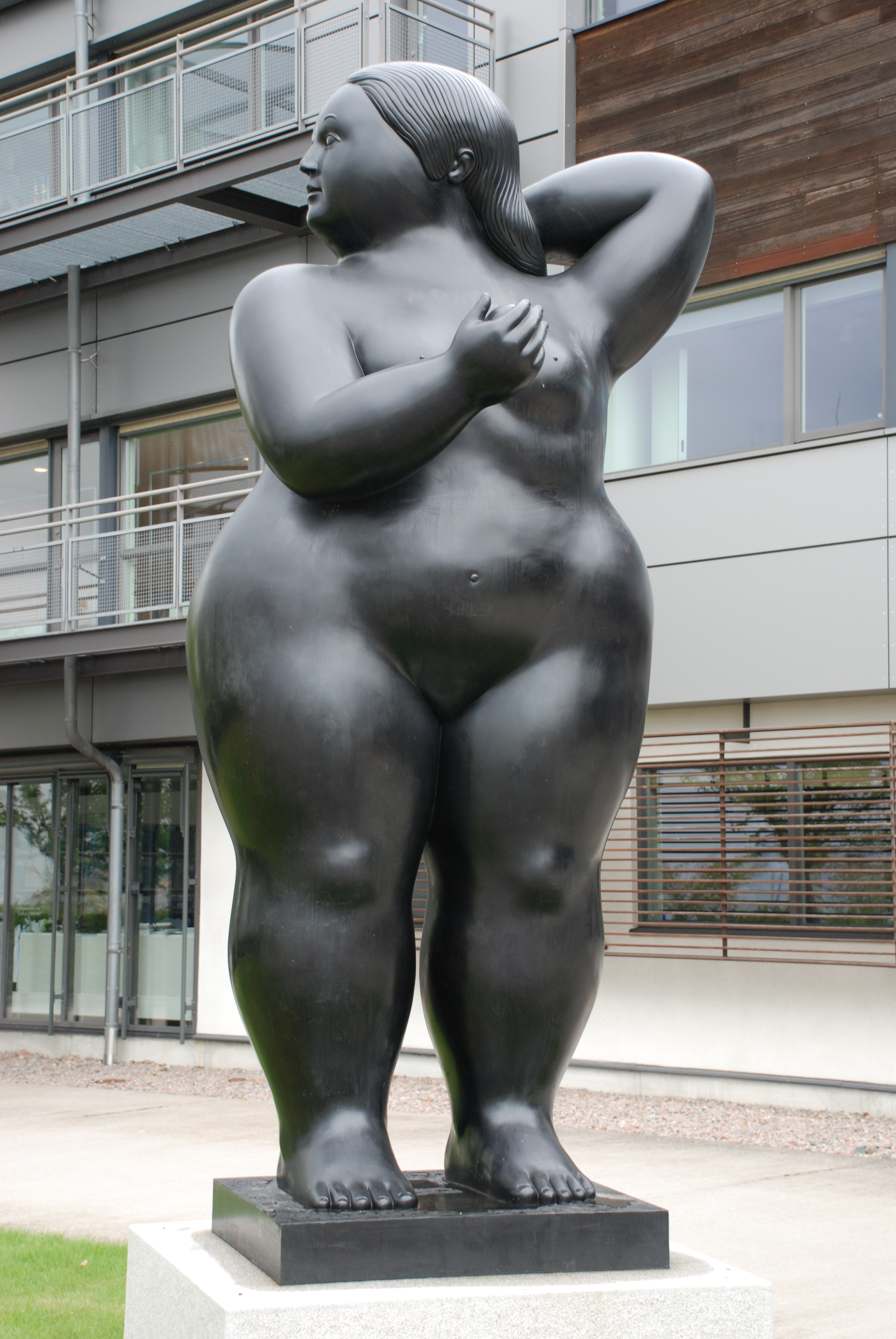
Sculpture by Fernando Botero

Fat fetishism or adipophilia (Latin adeps - "fat" and Greek φιλία - "love") is a sexual attraction directed towards overweight or obese people due primarily to their weight and size.

A variety of fat fetishism is 'feed(er)ism' or 'gaining', where sexual gratification is obtained from the process of gaining, or helping others gain, body fat, not necessarily from the fat itself, though there is much overlap between these groups. Fat fetishism also incorporates 'stuffing' and 'padding', whereas the focus of arousal is on the sensations and properties of a real or simulated gain.

== As a subculture ==
The fat fetishism community has overlapped with body positivity and fat feminism movements. The National Association to Advance Fat Acceptance (NAAFA) has worked as an advocacy organization for fat people, but was partly formed to help male fat fetishists and other fat admirers (FAs) find fat women to date and have sex with.

Fat fetishism includes both real-life and internet communities. Fat fetishism practices and subcultures include internet porn; "gaining" and "feeding", which involves eating to intentionally gain weight; "hogging", which is men seeking fat women to sexually exploit; and "squashing" which is sexual attraction to the idea of being crushed by a fat person or people.

According to The Routledge Companion to Beauty Politics, "the gendered, raced, and classed power dynamics of many of these subcultures often mirror, reinforce, and even exaggerate existing racial, gender, class, and sexual inequalities." Sociologist Abigail C. Saguy has proposed that by objectifying women's weight, they are reinforcing the cultural importance of women's weight to their physical appearance, therefore also reinforcing gender inequality.

=== Feedism ===
Gainers and feedees are people who enjoy the fantasy or reality of being fed and/or gaining weight themselves. Feedism can be distinguished from non-fetishistic attraction to fat bodies in that it commonly involves a partialistic attraction to large bellies; a sexual fixation on food and eating, often to the point of overfullness ('stuffing'); and an incorporation of weight-related degradation into erotic talk. Feedists commonly report being unable to enjoy sexual activity without the involvement of the fetish.

Encouragers and feeders typically enjoy the fantasy of helping someone else gain weight. 'Gainer' and 'encourager' are common labels among gay men, while both straight men and women as well as lesbian women often identify as feeders and feedees. Some prefer the term "feedism" over feederism, as it suggests a more equal relationship between the feeder and feedee.

While gaining and feeding are often considered fetishes, many within the gainer and feedism communities report viewing them more as a lifestyle, identity or sexual orientation.

Feedism is portrayed by media as a taboo or a niche interest. Negative media portrayals include the 2005 film Feed, which is an example of non-consensual feedism. Research has shown that the overwhelming majority of feedism relationships are fully consensual and immobility is mostly kept as a fantasy for participants.

The gay gainer community grew out of the Girth & Mirth movement in the '70s. By 1988 there were gainer-specific newsletters and in 1992, the first gainer event, called EncourageCon, was held in New Hope, Pennsylvania. In 1996, GainRWeb launched, the first website dedicated to gay men into weight gain.

== See also ==
- Bear (gay culture)
- Big Beautiful Woman
- Big Handsome Man
- Chub (gay culture)
- Fat acceptance movement
- Leblouh
- Fattening room
- Obesity and sexuality
