= Tevragh Zeina Mosque =

Mosque in Tevragh-Zeina, Nouakchott, Mauritania

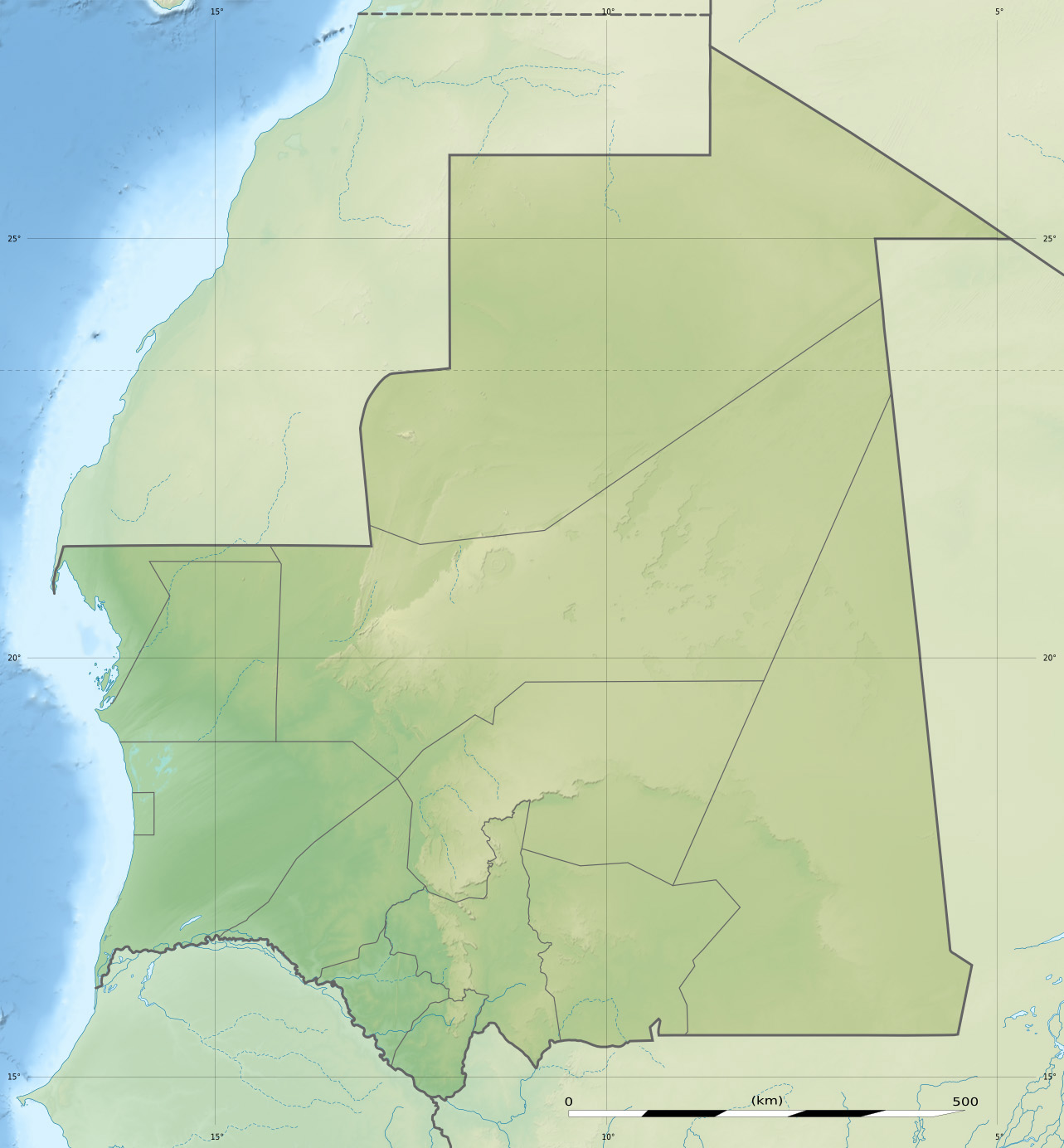
- Location of the mosque in Mauritania

Religion
- Affiliation: Sunni Islam
- Ecclesiastical or organizational status: Mosque
- Status: Active

Location
- Location: Tevragh-Zeina, Nouakchott
- Country: Mauritania
- Interactive map of Tevragh Zeina Mosque
- Coordinates: 18°6′2″N 15°58′58″W

Architecture
- Type: Mosque architecture

The Tevragh Zeina Mosque is a Sunni Islam mosque in Tevragh-Zeina, Nouakchott, Mauritania. It is located southeast of the Stade olympique, immediately to the east of the Clinique Chiva.

== See also ==
- Islam in Mauritania
- List of mosques in Mauritania
