= Friday Mosque of Nouakchott =

Mosque in Nouakchott, Mauritania

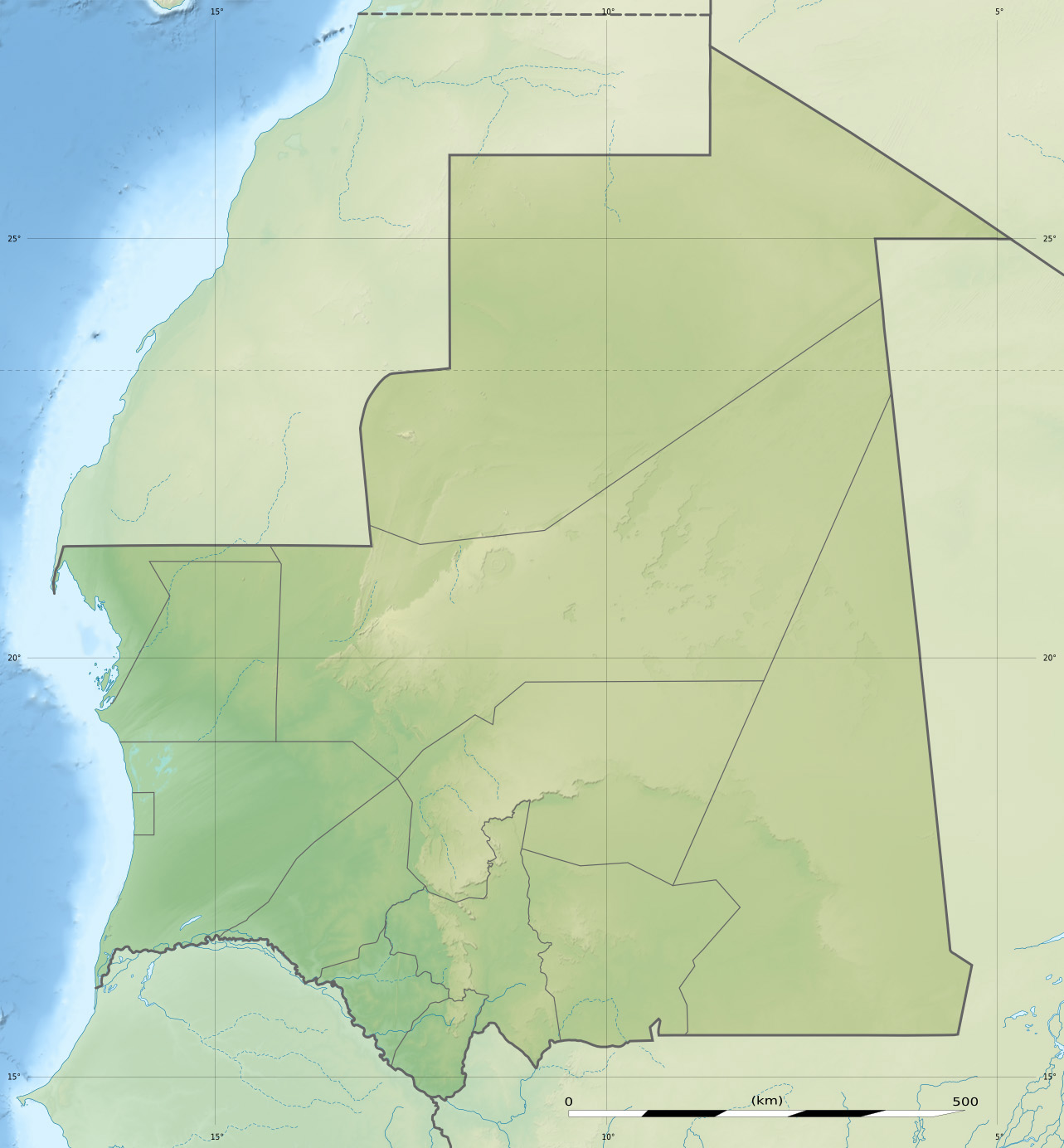
- Location of the mosque in Mauritania

Religion
- Affiliation: Sunni Islam
- Ecclesiastical or organizational status: Mosque
- Status: Active

Location
- Location: Nouakchott
- Country: Mauritania
- Interactive map of Friday Mosque of Nouakchott
- Coordinates: 18°5′16″N 15°57′51″W

Architecture
- Type: Mosque architecture

The Friday Mosque of Nouakchott is a Sunni Islam mosque in Nouakchott, Mauritania. It is located just southeast of the Lebanese International University on the Avenue Gamal Abdel Nasser, next to the Judiciary Palace and the headquarters of Air Mauritania.

== See also ==
- Islam in Mauritania
- List of mosques in Mauritania
