= List of mosques in Mauritania =

This is a list of mosques in Mauritania.

== List ==
Name	Image	Location	Year (CE)	Group	Notes
Chinguetti Mosque		Chinguetti	13th-14th century	Su	The minaret is claimed to be the second oldest in continuous use anywhere in the Muslim world. Located within the Ancient Ksour of Ouadane, Chinguetti, Tichitt and Oualata, a UNESCO World Heritage Site.
Ibn Abass Mosque		Nouakchott			
Marocaine Mosque		Nouakchott		Su	
Nouadhibou Mosque		Nouakchott		Su	A wooden mosque
Friday Mosque of Nouakchott		Nouakchott		Su	
Saudi Mosque		Nouakchott	2012	Su	Affiliated with the Salafi movement and funded by the Saudi Government; also known as the Nouakchott Grand Mosque.
Tevragh Zeina Mosque		Tevragh-Zeina, Nouakchott		Su	

== See also ==
- Islam in Mauritania
- List of mosques in Africa
