= Obesity in the Middle East and North Africa =

Share of adults that are obese in different countries in the Middle East and North Africa, 1975 to 2016

Obesity in the Middle East and North Africa is a notable health issue. Out of the 15 nations with the highest rates of obesity in the world as of 2014, according to the World Health Organization (WHO), five were located in the Middle East and North Africa region.

In 2005, the WHO measured that 1.6 billion people were overweight and 400 million were obese. It estimated that by the year 2015, 2.3 billion people will be overweight and 700 million will be obese. The Middle East, including the Arabian Peninsula, Eastern Mediterranean, Turkey, and Iran, and North Africa, are no exception to the worldwide increase in obesity. Subsequently, some call this trend the New World syndrome. The lifestyle changes associated with the discovery of oil and the subsequent increase in wealth is one contributing factor.

Urbanization has occurred rapidly and has been accompanied by new technologies that promote sedentary lifestyles. Due to the accessibility of private cars, television, and household appliances, the population as a whole is engaging in less physical activity. The rise in caloric and fat intake in a region where exercise is not a defining part of the culture has added to the overall increased percentages of overweight and obese populations. In addition, women are more likely to be overweight or obese due to cultural norms and perceptions of appropriate female behavior and occupations inside and outside of the home.

== Obesity ==
The medical condition of being overweight or obesity is defined as "abnormal or excessive fat accumulation that may impair health". It is measured through the Body Mass Index (BMI), defined as a person's weight, in kilograms, divided by the square of the person's height, in meters. If an individual has a BMI of 25–29, he or she is overweight. Having a BMI of 30 or more means an individual is obese. The greater the BMI, the greater the risk of chronic diseases as a result of obesity. These diseases include cardiovascular diseases, diabetes, musculoskeletal disorders, cancer, and premature death.

== Cause ==
The MONICA Project, sponsored by the World Health Organization, found that 30% of the population in the Arab World is overweight or obese, including adolescents and adults. This percentage is smaller for North African countries than oil-producing countries, but is still a prevalent trend. The spread of the Western lifestyle, defined as "the intake of attractive energy dense food with undesirable composition, increased consumption of animal fats and sugars and reduced consumption of dietary fiber, along with a lack of sufficient physical activity", is one of the leading causes. Specifically in the Arabian Peninsula, "physical activity of the population has significantly diminished with the availability of housemaids, private cars, television, and sophisticated household appliances. In addition, the types of food and fat intake have changed...".

Other common factors, besides a sedentary lifestyle and unhealthy food choices, across the Arab world include urbanization, technology, and a cultural appreciation of female plumpness and the practice of leblouh ("fattening").

== By percentage ==
Overweight and Obesity Statistics in the Middle East and North Africa
		% of Overweight Men	% of Overweight Women	% of Obese Men	% of Obese Women	Source	Link to Article
Turkey	2001–2002	41.5%	28.6%	16.5%	29.4%		Obesity in Turkey
Israel	2011	45.8%	33.1%	15.4%	15.9%		Obesity in Israel
Palestinian territories	2003	----	23.9%	42.8%		Obesity in the Palestinian territories	
Jordan	2002	---	27.6%	---	26.3%		Obesity in Jordan
Lebanon	1998–2002	---	----	36.3%	38.3%		Obesity in Lebanon
Bahrain	1998–1999	36.7%	28.3%	23.3%	34.1%		Obesity in Bahrain
Kuwait	1998–2002	36.3%	32.8%	27.5%	29.9%		Obesity in Kuwait
Oman	2000	32.1%	27.3%	16.7%	23.8%		Obesity in Oman
Qatar	2003	34.3%	33%	34.6%	45.3%		Obesity in Qatar
Saudi Arabia	1995–2002	42.4%	31.8%	26.4%	44.0%		Obesity in Saudi Arabia
United Arab Emirates	2000	36.7%	28.4%	17.1%	31.4%		Obesity in United Arab Emirates
Iran	2005	27.9%	29.3%	9.1%	19.2%		Obesity in Iran
Algeria	2003	27.4%	32.2%	8.8%	21.4%		Obesity in Algeria
Egypt	2005, 2021	---	33.2%	29.51%	49.49%		Obesity in Egypt, The Burden of Obesity in Egypt
Morocco	2000	25.5%	29.8%	8.2%	21.7%		Obesity in Morocco
Tunisia	1997	23.3%	28.2%	6.7%	22.7%		Obesity in Tunisia

=== Turkey ===
In 2001–2002, 36.8% of the population was overweight and 23.5% obese. In that same year, 11.4% of boys and 10.3% of girls age 12–17 were overweight. The occurrence of diabetes is higher among women than men.

Obesity and being overweight is higher among women for several reasons. A majority of women do not have jobs outside of the home and lead more sedentary lifestyles as a result. Housework is often the only source of physical activity for women, as there is no prior tradition of women participating in sports. Individuals living in urban areas are more likely to be overweight or obese because of the availability of public transportation and the sedentary lifestyle. A lack of knowledge about diabetes and the health consequences also contribute to the high percentage of excessive weight.

=== Israel ===
Obesity rates in Israel are below the average for OECD nations, with an obesity rate of 14% for adults in 2009. Socioeconomic status was one factor that impacted overweight and obesity percentages, particularly for women. Women in lower classes were four times as likely to be overweight or obese as women in upper classes. Only 20.2% of the entire population reported that they exercise for twenty minutes or more three times a week.

=== Lebanon ===
23.4% of boys and 19.7% of girls were overweight in 1996. Among university students at Lebanese American University in 2008, more male students were overweight or obese than female students. 37% of males were overweight and 13.6% were obese, while 13.6% of females were overweight and 3.2% were obese.

The current trend towards obesity is influenced by more than the shift from traditional Mediterranean to fast food. Individuals who had a low level of education, were non-smokers, and had a family history of obesity were more likely to have an unhealthy body weight. Although females at the Lebanese American University were more likely to snack between meals than their male counterparts, they have more motivation to be thin than males due to sex differences in physical attraction.

=== Bahrain ===
The Food and Agriculture Organization estimates that almost 66% of the adult population is overweight or obese. In 2000, it was determined that amongst children age 12–17, 29.9% of boys and 42.4% of girls were overweight. The MONICA project, sponsored by the WHO, found that 15.6% of boys and 17.4% of girls in high school were obese. Currently 15% of the population has diabetes.

Increased consumption of fast food and predominance of sedentary lifestyles have led to this occurrence. These unhealthy eating habits are reinforced in school canteens, where high fat and high carbohydrate foods such as pizza, burgers, sandwiches, and za'atar, are available for lunch. Between meal times, children prefer French fries, chocolate, and soda, which lack micronutrients and dietary fiber.

=== Kuwait ===
From 1980 to 1993, the percentage of individuals age 18–29 that were overweight rose from 30.6% to 54.4% and the percentage of those who were overweight increased from 12.8% to 24.6%. The number of women who are either overweight or obese has jumped to 80% in 2010. In the book "Top 10 of Everything 2011", the women of Kuwait ranked 5th for the highest percentage of obesity. In 2000, it was determined that amongst children age 10–14, 30% of boys and 31.8% of girls were overweight.

According to the Dasman Diabetes Institute, 15% of the adult population has diabetes, with 50% of adults over 45 living with the disease. 22 of every 100 children have developed diabetes as a result of an unhealthy weight.

The increased risk of excess weight or obesity is due to a combination of overeating energy-dense, high-fat foods and sedentary lifestyles. Meals consisting of processed ingredients with preservatives, saturated fats, and hydrogenated oil are preferred over traditional foods. Advertisements for unhealthy junk food are seen everywhere and public schools sell candy, chocolate, and soda to their students. Specifically in Kuwaiti universities, other factors include eating between meals, marital status, and a male domination of sports.

=== Oman ===
The key factors to these high obesity levels are the adoption of eating habits in the Western lifestyle. The youth population consumes more fat, milk, and meat than previous generations.

=== Qatar ===
36.5% of boys and 23.6% of girls age 12–17 were overweight in 2003. By 2015, it is predicted that 73% of women and 69% of men will be obese. According to the International Association for the Study of Obesity, Qatar has the 6th highest rate of obesity among boys in the Middle East and North Africa region. It is also ranked 5th for having the highest percentage of people between 20 and 79 with diabetes. Currently 16% of the population has diabetes.

One reason for the obesity trend is the lack of exercise and poorly designed pedestrian friendly cities. "Like other oil-rich nations, Qatar has leaped across decades of development in a short time, leaving behind the physically demanding life of the desert for air-conditioned comfort, servants, and fast food". Although the type of food eaten has changed, the cultural traditions surrounding food have not. Food is often consumed communally, making it nearly impossible to ensure proper portions. A person who does not eat when food is offered is seen as offensive and shameful. It is also normal within Qatari society to be obese.

=== Saudi Arabia ===
Across the whole population from 1995 to 2000, 36.9% were overweight and 35.6% were obese. Rates were high amongst children aged 5–17, as 16.7% of boys and 19.4% of girls were overweight. By 2006, 52% of men, 66% of women, 18% of teenagers, and 15% of preschoolers were overweight or obese.

In 2008, 17.99% of deaths were caused by cardiovascular disease. During this year, 95% of the 424,968 total appointments to diabetics clinics were made for Saudi citizens. 55% of these diabetic citizens were women and 44% were men.

The latest national prevalence for childhood obesity (ages 5 to 18) in Saudi Arabia reported: 23.1% were overweight, 9.3% were obese and 2% were severely obese (2%) (El-Mouzan et al., 2010).

Part of the reason for the high rate of overweight and obesity within the population are urban residents that consume hypercaloric foods while maintaining a sedentary lifestyle. The less-than physically demanding lifestyle urban residents lead is linked to a high level of education and income. In addition, women had an increased risk of obesity because of cultural and religious beliefs that require women to stay at home as a housewife. Women are prohibited from using hotel gyms and pools and are targets of harassment when they exercise publicly. This is based on the belief that giving women the freedom to exercise would lead to the corruption and decline of the nation. In schools, physical activity for girls is avoided because some fear that changing clothes outside of the home would cause girls to lose their shyness, an admirable moral quality.

=== United Arab Emirates ===
In 1999, 24.8% of boys and 89.2% of girls age 4–18 were overweight. This number increased to 25% in 2008. As a result, 13.5% of the population had diabetes in 2000. This number is estimated to rise to 19.3% by 2030. Currently 20% of the population has diabetes.

The population, especially children, over-consume food rich in carbohydrates, salt, fat, and processed sugar. This health problem is exacerbated due to the lack of an exercise culture. The recent availability of wealth due to oil has allowed Emiratis to purchase luxury items, including imported food and tobacco products. The marketing of such products is effective on the youth population. There is little to no awareness of the health impact of these items among the population. Another factor of obesity risk is prevalence of the cultural notion that a fat child is healthy, while a thin one is sick. Childhood obesity in UAE may be linked to excessive use of technology as 9 in 10 children have access to handheld devices.

=== Iran ===
In 1988, Iran was one of the top seven countries with the highest rate of childhood obesity. In 2005, 33.7% of adults were at risk of developing metabolic syndrome. Eight million Iranians already live with this syndrome. In 1995, 24.7% of boys and 26.8% of girls age 6 were overweight.

One of the major reasons for increased obesity is urbanization. In 2005, an average Iranian citizen consumed 42 liters of soda per year, as well as 40% more carbohydrates, 30% more fat, and 40% more food than the body needs. The greater availability of fast food and junk food in combination with a low activity lifestyle has contributed to the obesity trend. Other factors include the impact of technology and a high consumption of rice and bread. Many families with a moderate income are limited in the foods they are able to afford, resulting in a higher incidence of obese children. Childhood obesity is not viewed as a concern because it is believed that these children will outgrow their fatness as they age. However, childhood obesity is a serious medical condition. It's particularly troubling because the extra kilograms often start children on the path to health problems that were once considered adult problems — diabetes, high blood pressure and high cholesterol.

=== Algeria ===
In 2003, 16.4% of the total population was obese. In 2006, 10.3% of boys and 8.7% of girls age 6–10 were overweight.

=== Egypt ===
In 1996, Egypt had the highest average BMI in the world at 26.3. In 1998, 1.6% of 2- to 6-year-olds, 4.9% of 6- to 10-year-olds, 14.7% of 10- to 14-year-olds, and 13.4% of 14- to 18-year-olds were obese. 45% of urban women and 20% of the rural population were obese. In 2021, 39.82% of adult Egyptians were obese.

Obesity rates rose as oils, fat, and sugars were more regularly consumed, beginning in the 1990s. The cultural appreciation of heavier female bodies is a factor. Another explanation is the degree to which food is the center of social events and special occasions. Heavy consumption of starchy and fatty foods without the presence of a health-conscious exercise culture is a major factor. As parents teach this lifestyle to their children, the prevalence of childhood obesity increases. Today, Egyptian teenagers drink three times as much soda as milk. Ten percent of males and females drink five or more cans of soda a day, which can lead to early osteoporosis in women in the future. These food habits are reinforced by junk food advertisements and the availability of unhealthy food at supermarkets. As a result, teenagers are three times as likely to be overweight than they were 20 years ago.

=== Palestine ===
According to the World Health Organization, obesity affects 26.8% of the Palestinian population (23.3% males, 30.8% females). This is mostly due to decreased physical activity and greater than necessary food consumption, particularly with an increase in energy coming from fat. Two other factors are smoking and urbanization. In addition, "leisure-time physical activity is not a common concept in the Palestinian context, especially for rural women, where lack of sex-segregated facilities and cultural norms are prohibitive factors." Women in urban areas face similar cultural restrictions.

=== Morocco ===
Adolescent girls are at a greater risk of becoming obese.

Obesity is linked to a greater availability of food, particularly from the West, and an increasingly sedentary lifestyle in urban areas. A woman who has a low level of schooling or no education in urban areas is significantly more likely to be obese. She, along with the general public, are not aware of the medical conditions that result from obesity. Rather, female fatness is embraced as it "is viewed as a sign of social status and is a cultural symbol of beauty, fertility, and prosperity". Being thin is a sign of sickness or poverty.

=== Mauritania ===
In Mauritania, the concept of beauty is embodied through the practice of leblouh ("fattening"). Before marriage, girls intentionally overeat and perform limited physical activity for 40 days in order to be attractive for their soon-to-be husbands. Women will repeat this process if they want to gain weight after marriage. It is believed that traditional clothing of these ethnic groups require a heavier body in order to be attractive.

=== Tunisia ===
In 1997, 27.4% of the population was overweight and 14.4% were obese. Obesity rates were twice as high in urban areas than in rural areas.

== Government response ==
=== Jordan ===
The Jordanian government released the white paper "National Health Research Priorities 2009–2012", briefly describing health concerns in a variety of areas. The section about non-communicable diseases and health behavior specifically addressed obesity and its effects. The diseases that were targeted were hypertension and obesity dyslipidemias. Dietary habits, exercise, and alcohol consumption were targeted in the health behavior section. The paper did not elaborate on how these priorities would be addressed or resolved.

=== Kuwait ===
The Kuwaiti government has dealt with the prevalence of obesity through a variety of methods, including awareness campaigns through exercise, health forums, and health fairs. In 2007, the Health Ministry supported the National Bank of Kuwait Walkathon in Salmiya in an effort to raise awareness of the health problems associated with weight gain and obesity. Over 9,000 people attended. Another individual, Jasem Al-Zeraei, started the Six-K Walking Club with the intention of achieving the same goal.

In 2009, the Mediterranean Diet Fair was held at Kuwait's Dasman Institute for Research, Training, and Prevention of Diabetes & Other Chronic Conditions. Educating the public about how to eat a healthy diet was the purpose of the fair. However, unlike other initiatives, participants were told how to eat well and enjoy food at the same time.

In 2010, the New Mowasat Hospital hosted a Ramadan health forum. Entitled "Stay Healthy...While Fasting", the audience was lectured on diabetes and obesity and the health benefits of fasting. Four qualified doctors from the New Mowasat Hospital's Cardiology, Diabetology, Dietetics, and Urology Department, presented medical information and advice. They spoke on various topics, including meal management, the role of physical activities, and the types of high fat foods eaten during Ramadan. Additionally, the Petrochemical Industries Company organized several health-care related activities for their employees. One of the main focuses was countering obesity. The entitled "Get Fit" campaign offered free blood tests and nutritional advice and provided lectures given by knowledgeable doctors. The dangers of obesity were also addressed through the distribution of brochures and fitness advice and public posting of awareness posters.

=== Oman ===
The Omani government responded to the health issues related to obesity in its 7th Five-Year Plan for Health Development National Strategic Plan 2006–2010. Acknowledging within the document that the swift to an unhealthy lifestyle is leading to obesity, hypertension, cardiac diseases, and diabetes, strategic objectives and visions were developed.

The visions included prevention and control of non-communicable diseases, promotion health awareness of the community and establishing a culture of healthy lifestyle. These goals are to be achieved through a focus on the areas of reducing non-communicable diseases, health education, adolescent and youth health, and nutrition.

In 2000, 11.6% of the adult population had diabetes and 35.2% of males and 30.9% of females had hypertension. By 2010, the target goal was that only 45% of the population 20 years or older were overweight or obese. Increasing the percentage of people who walked 150 minutes a week to 50% would aid in this goal. Early diagnosis of non-communicable diseases was another strategy to improve the health of the Omani population.

In order to educate the target goal of 90% of the population on unhealthy practices in nutrition by 2010, a website was to be designed and made available by 2007. Weekly series on health covered by radio, newspapers, and television should be established by 2010, as should 30 substantial health education materials produced on various health topics. Additionally, health institutions and communities in the country should have completed 250,000 health-related activities by 2010. This would aid the government in achieving its goal of increasing the percentage of the population exercising to 40%.

In order to combat childhood obesity and the medical consequences of it in adulthood, the promotion of healthy lifestyles was designated as the central focus. Three factors were mentioned: eating breakfast, physical activity outside of school, and maintaining positive attitudes towards a healthy lifestyle. By 2010, 70% of 13 through 15 years old should be eating breakfast, 70% should be exercising independently of school requirements, and 50% more youth and families should have positive ideas about healthy lifestyles. All of these factors would result in a lower percentage of overweight youth population.

Improved nutritional practices were also linked to decreasing obesity by a significant percentage. This is prescribed to occur by the promotion of healthy nutritional practices, such as community activities and informational pamphlets. By 2010, 60% of the population should have adequate knowledge of beneficial nutritional practices.

=== Saudi Arabia ===
The government is combating the obesity concern with regular coverage of the disease and the other consequences of being of an unhealthy weight in daily newspapers. During Ramadan, it established a program called "Hello Ramadan." It provided health information related to fasting and allowed listeners to call in to learn more about diabetes and high blood pressure. Listeners could also receive medical information via fax from the program.

=== United Arab Emirates ===
The United Arab Emirates has launched an intense campaign to address the high rates of obesity. It began its campaign in 2007 and has continued it today. In the summer of 2007, the Sanofi-Aventis along with the World Health Organization sponsored an event with free health screenings. The purpose was to raise awareness about obesity, its dangers, and its connection to cardiovascular diseases. This was in response to unacceptable results from the International Day for Evaluation of Abdominal Obesity survey, which determined that 37% of adults age 30 plus were obese. The Ministry of Health also designed a school program for the 2007–2008 year which targeted teenagers and their health. Topics addressed in the year-long awareness and education program included smoking, personal hygiene, physical exercise, and obesity. Exercising and playing sports in order to fight obesity was a key component.

In 2009, the Ministry of Health drafted a set of nutritional guidelines focused on maintaining the current level of non-communicable diseases. The other major goal was to improve the well-being of the entire population. Nutritional education programs were set up in health centers, schools, and women associations to spread awareness of non-communicable diseases and how to prevent them. The development of a better dietary culture in school canteens and hospitals was a second approach. This draft was included as part of the National Nutritional Strategy and Action Plan for 2010–2015. The National Nutrition Committee was also founded at this time with the purpose of creating a national strategy.

The National Nutrition Strategy was announced in early 2010. It was designed to ensure that the citizens of the United Arab Emirates would have a healthier future. The Strategy outlined how this goal would be achieved. Early nutritional intervention programs and an emphasis on healthy foods and exercise at home, school, and the workplace was one way listed. By spreading health and nutrition awareness, the prevalence of obesity and non-communicable diseases was being addressed. The Ministry of Health later announced that a nutritional survey would be completed in December 2010. This would ensure that the nutritional strategy was being implemented properly and effectively.

The General Administration of Youth Centers and the Department of Health Education and Promotion sponsored a camp in July 2010 for a select 20 teenagers battling obesity. Every participant was challenged to lose one kilogram a week. A medical check up and relevant tests were conducted at the beginning and end of the session. At the camp, the teenagers were given lectures on healthy food consumption. They also participated in daily sports activities and ate healthy meals and snacks.

The Ministry of Health conducted an awareness campaign at the same time, entitling it "Summer in My Country." This consisted of a series of lectures aimed at teenagers and covered topics such as smoking, obesity, and losing weight. The Abu Dhabi Food Control Authority, addressed the rising rates of obesity by banning all junk food from school canteens. This included burgers, shawarma, sugary drinks, and energy drinks. Parents were supportive of the decision, as one in eight children is obese.

On October 8–9, 2010, the Ministry of Health sponsored the International Diabetes Summit in Dubai. The purpose of the conference was to "highlight the rising prevalence of diabetes and its complications in the world in general and the Middle East in particular". One of the topical focuses was diabetes in the Middle East, especially amongst youth populations. Another summit will take place on February 25–26, 2011.

=== Iran ===
In 2002, a dietary health intervention program called "the Isfahan Healthy Heart Programme" was established. The program is supported by the Iranian Budget and Planning Organization, as well as the Deputy for Health of the Iranian Ministry of Health and Medical Education. Intervention took the form of public education through the mass media, marketing, and policy making. After an evaluation in 2006, the results showed that the program was effective in improving dietary behaviors. The population of Isfahan had switched to liquid oil and olive oil, rather than using hydrogenated oil, and consumed more healthy foods. Fruit, vegetables, fish, and low-fat dairy products were preferred over sausages, animal fat, and sweets. The Fat Consumption Index was lower after the campaign than before it.

=== Egypt ===
The Egyptian government produced a Demographic and Health Survey in 2008, covering topics from family planning to maternal health care to nutrition. Chapter 14 was dedicated to nutritional statistics and specifically mentioned obesity. It did not discuss future policy plans to address the rising trend of obesity.
