= Marché de La Viande =

Coordinates: 18°5′0″N 15°58′48″W

Marché de La Viande is a market in Nouakchott, Mauritania. It is located just to the southwest of Mosque Ould Abas.
