= Ibn Abass Mosque =

Mosque in Nouakchott, Mauritania

- Arabic: مسجد ابن عباس
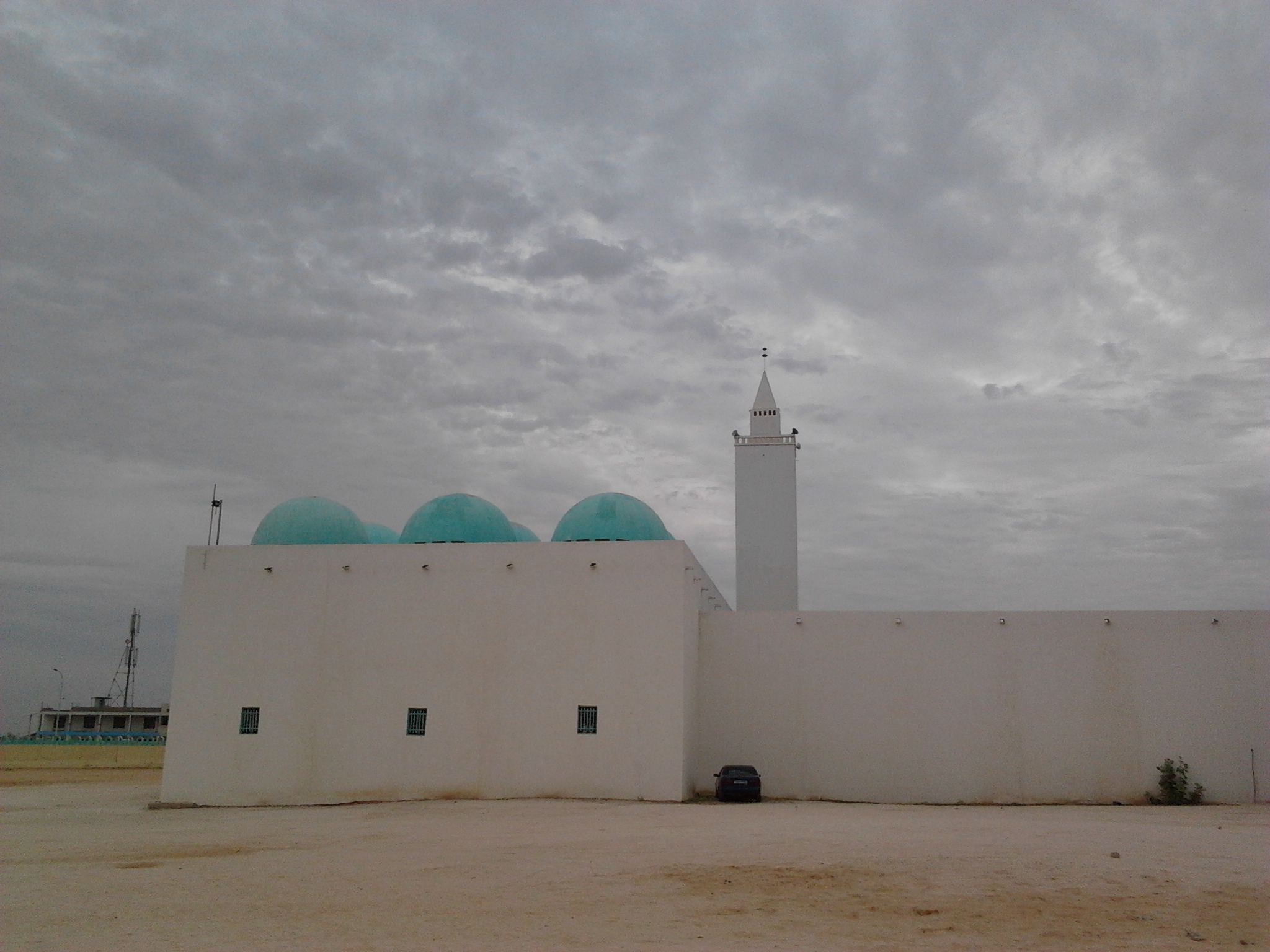
- The mosque in 2013

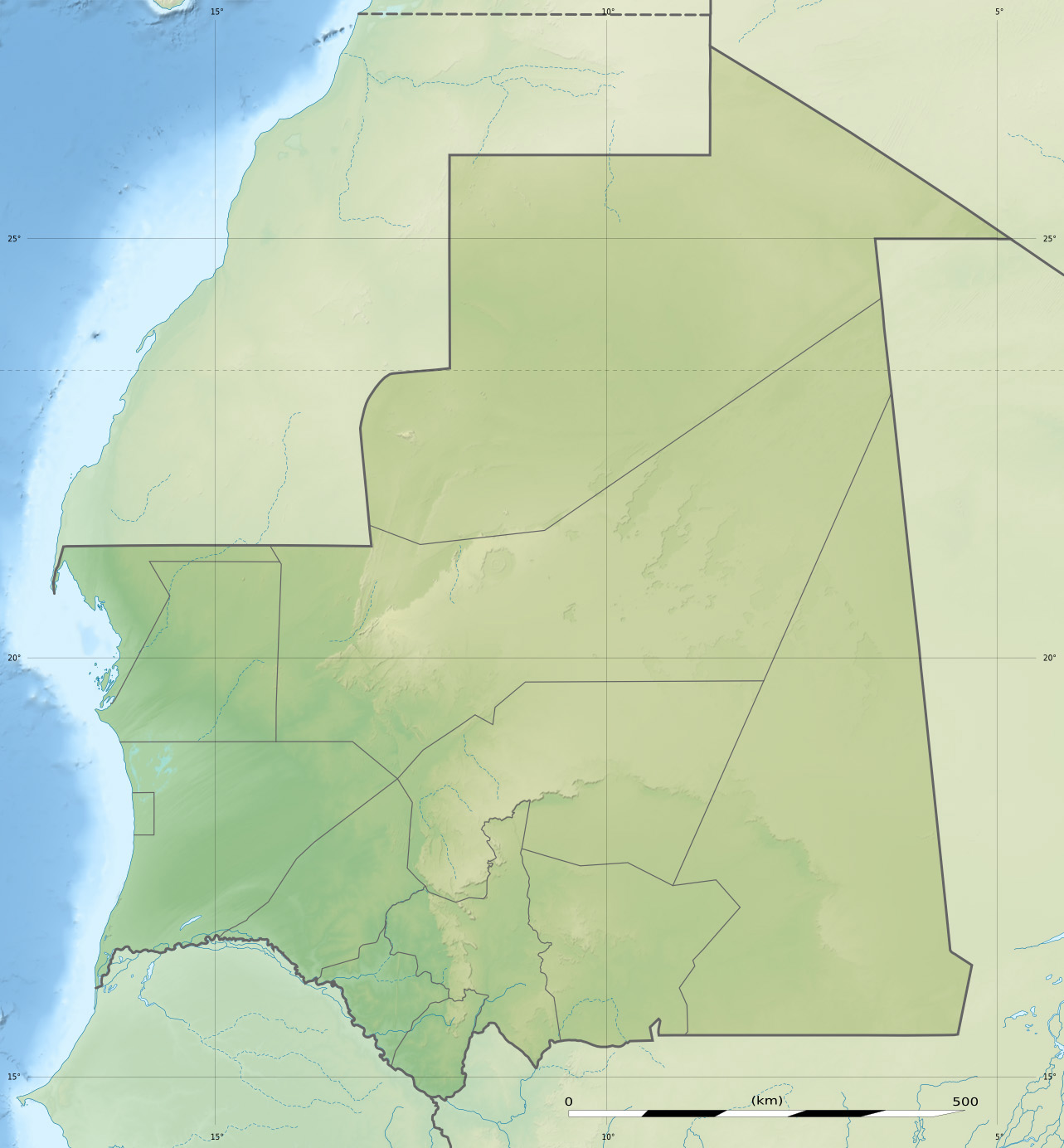
- Location within Mauritania

Religion
- Affiliation: Islam
- Ecclesiastical or organizational status: Mosque
- Leadership: Imam Ahmedou Ould Lemrabott Ould Habib Rahman
- Status: Active

Location
- Location: Nouakchott
- Country: Mauritania
- Interactive map of Ibn Abass Mosque
- Coordinates: 18°5′3″N 15°58′44″W

Architecture
- Type: Mosque architecture

Specifications
- Dome: 15 (maybe more?)
- Minaret: One

The Ibn Abass Mosque (Arabic: مسجد ابن عباس), also called the Mosque Ould Abbas, is a mosque in Nouakchott, Mauritania. It is located between Marche de La Viande and Marche Capitale, southwest of Mosque Saudique.

== See also ==
- Islam in Mauritania
- List of mosques in Mauritania
