= Forest View High School (Illinois) =

Location
- 2121 S. Goebbert Rd. Arlington Heights, Illinois 60005; United States; 42.0458°N 87.97255°W

Information
- School type: Public secondary
- Opened: 1962
- Status: Closed
- Closed: 1986
- School district: Twp. HS District 214
- Grades: 9–12
- Gender: Coed
- Campus: Suburban
- Campus size: 40 acres
- Colors: Black; Gold
- Fight song: "Fight for Forest View"
- Athletics conference: Mid-Suburban League
- Mascot: Ferdie the Falcon
- Nickname: Falcons
- Newspaper: Viewer
- Yearbook: Talon

Forest View High School was a public secondary school in Arlington Heights, Illinois, operational from 1963 until its closure because of declining enrollment in 1986. The school mascot was Ferdie the Falcon, and the school colors were silver, black, and gold.

== Athletics ==
Forest View's team nickname was the Falcons. The school was a member of the Illinois High School Association (IHSA), which governs most of the athletic and non-athletic competitions in Illinois.

When the school was closed, the IHSA turned over the accomplishments of the school to John Hersey High School, which is also a District 214 school in Arlington Heights.

The following teams finished in the top four of their respective IHSA sponsored state tournament or meet:

- Football: 2nd place (1985–86)
- Bowling (girls): 2nd place (1974–75, 1975–76); state champions (1973–74, 1976–77, 1977–78)
- Track & field (girls): 4th place (1972–73)

== Today ==
After the school closed on June 13, 1986, students attending Forest View switched to Rolling Meadows High School, Elk Grove High School or Prospect High School.

Forest View today serves multiple purposes:

- It is the central administrative office for Township High School District 214.
- It is the home to the district's Vanguard School, which is an alternative high school for students not excelling in traditional high school placements.
- It is home to the district's Newcomer Center, which helps give newly arrived immigrants an opportunity to learn the English language and to better transition into one of the district's six high schools.
- It is home to the Forest View Alternative School, which is a therapeutic day school that draws students from across the district who are eligible for special education, and whose behavioral or emotional needs extend beyond the scope of what can be addressed in a traditional placement setting.

== Notable alumni ==
- Donald Wayne Foster (class of 1968), Vassar College professor, known for forensic literary analysis
- Jerry Jenkins (class of 1967), co-author of the best-selling Left Behind series of books
- Larry Monroe (class of 1974), former MLB player for the Chicago White Sox
- David Sarwer (class of 1986), associate dean for research, director of the Center for Obesity Research and Education, College of Public Health, Temple University
- Rick Zombo (class of 1981), former professional hockey player who played in the NHL for the Detroit Red Wings, St. Louis Blues, and Boston Bruins 1984–1996
