= Marocaine market =

Mauritanian market

Coordinates: 18°4′36″N 15°58′45″W

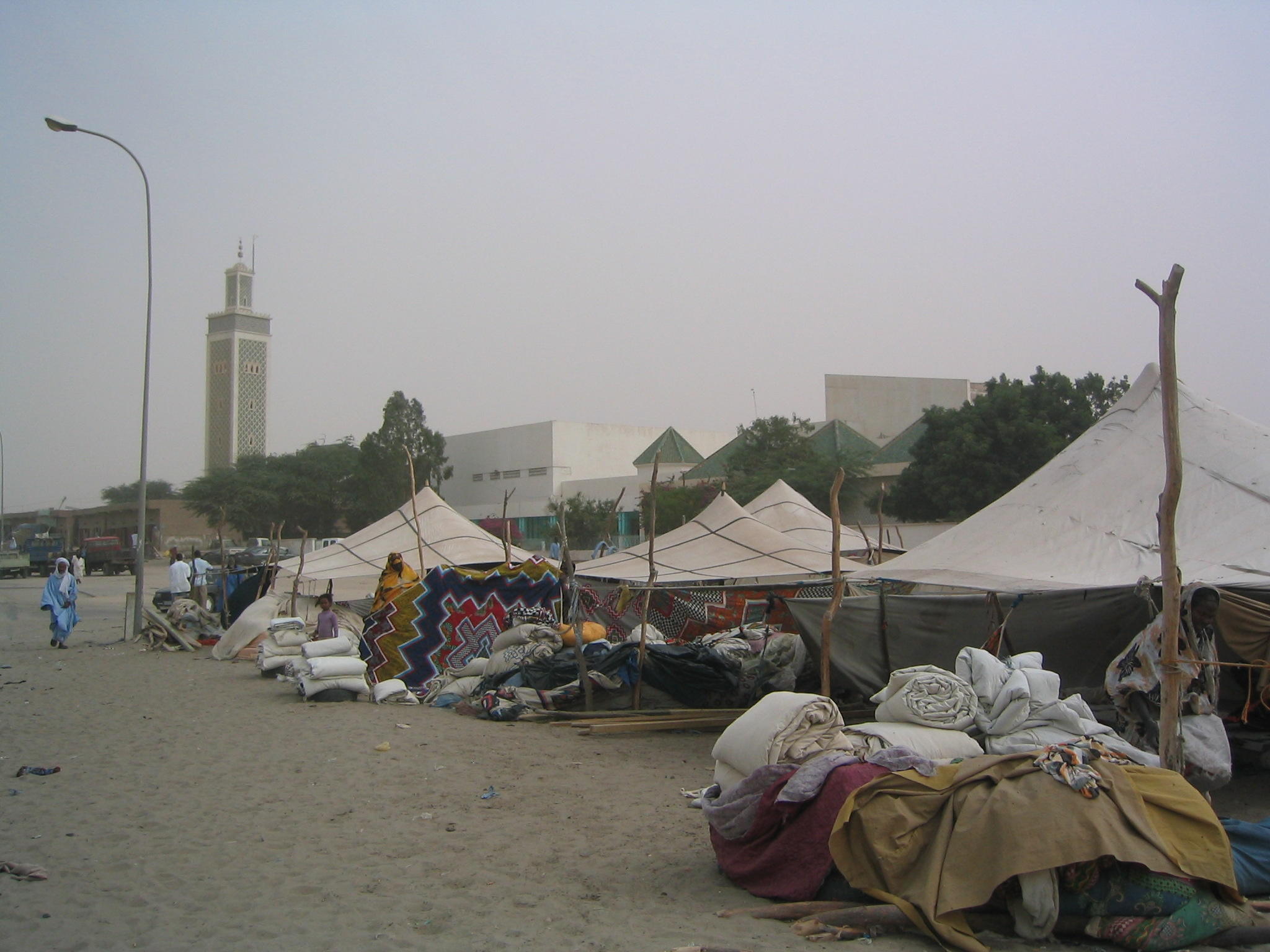
Marocaine Market

Marocaine market is a Moroccan market in Nouakchott, Mauritania. It is located just to the east of Mosque Marocaine.
