= Judiciary Palace =

Justice Palace in Nouakchott, Mauritania

Coordinates: 18°5′14″N 15°57′57″W

Judiciary Palace is a palace located in Nouakchott, Mauritania. It is located on the Avenue Gamal Abdel Nasser, between the Friday Mosque of Nouakchott and the headquarters of Mauritania Airlines.
