= Marché Capitale =

Coordinates: 18°5′10″N 15°58′46″W

Marché Capitale is a market in Nouakchott, Mauritania. It is located just to the northwest of Mosque Ould Abas.

In 2013, it was reported that the market was on the verge of collapse, posing a serious risk due to overcrowding, poor infrastructure, and chaotic encroachments. The Urban Community of Nouakchott (CUN) suggested demolishing it and building a new, modern facility, but faced bureaucratic hurdles.
