= Polygamy in Mauritania =

Polygyny

Under the personal status code, and Sharia law, polygyny is legal in Mauritania. A man can marry up to four women, but must obtain the consent of his existing wife/wives first.

== Prevalence ==
Polygamy is common within the Afro-Mauritanian and Berber Moorish population, occurring less frequently among the Arab Moorish population. In 2007, 10.7% of women aged 15-49 were in a polygamous union.

== See also ==
- Child marriage in Mauritania
