= Folk Stories from Southern Nigeria =

1910 book

Folk Stories from Southern Nigeria is a book published in 1910.

The book contains forty folk stories and fairy tales from Southern Nigeria. The stories were collected by Elphinstone Dayrell, then the District Commissioner of the region. The book has an introduction by Andrew Lang, famous for his series of fairy books.
