= Child marriage in Mauritania =

Child marriage in Mauritania: in 2017 in Mauritania, 37% of girls are married off before they are 18 years old; 14% are married before they turn 15. Mauritania is the 19th highest nation in the world for child marriage.

A third of women in Mauritania marry early.

== Age at first marriage for women in Mauritania in 2016 ==
Age at first marriage for women in Mauritania in 2016:

	18–22 current years of questioned women	18–49 current years of questioned women
Not Married	50.7 %	20.9 %
18 yo or Above	14.1 %	30.4 %
Below 12 yo	5.0 %	9.8 %
12 yo	3.2 %	5.6 %
13 yo	4.5	5.5 %
14 yo	6.0	6.9 %
15 yo	5.1	9.0 %
16 yo	5.1	6.2 %
17 yo	6.4	5.7 %
Total	100.0	100.0
Mean age at first marriage	15.6 yo	16.8 yo

== See also ==
- Polygamy in Mauritania
