= Religion in Mauritania =

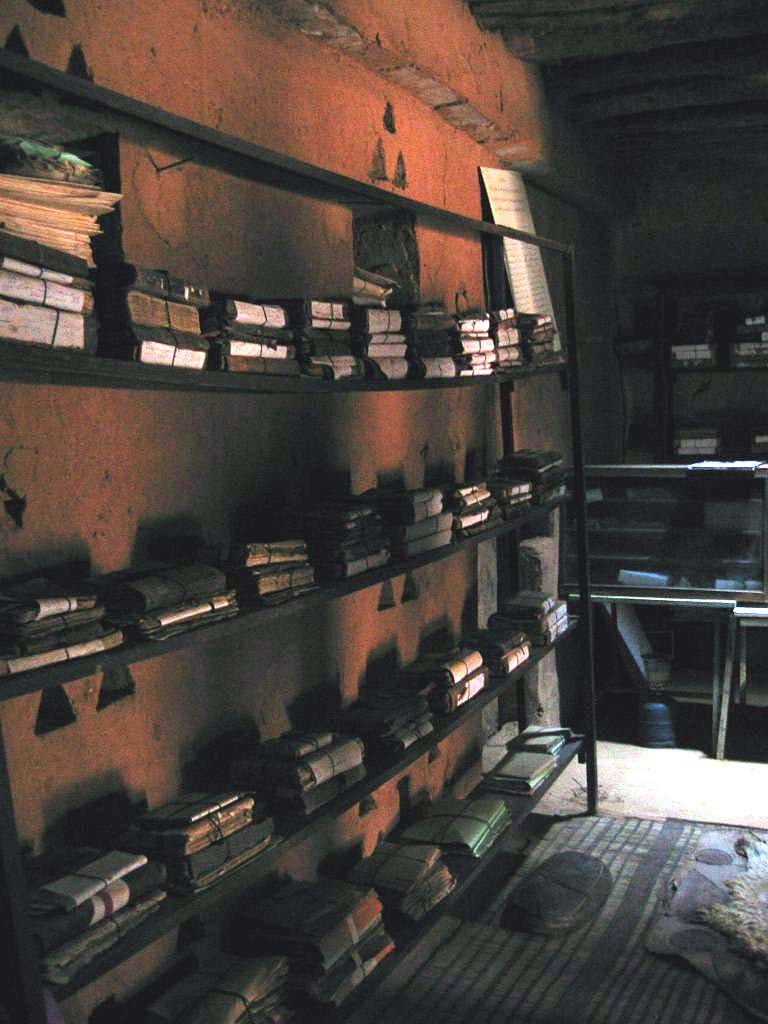
Qur'an collection in a library in Chinguetti

The people of Mauritania are overwhelmingly adherents of Sunni Islam, of the Maliki school of jurisprudence.

The country’s Islamic identity is deeply tied to its political system: Mauritania is constitutionally an Islamic Republic, and Islamic law has a major influence on its legal and social frameworks.

Mauritania is a country in Africa, bordering Algeria, Mali, Senegal, and the Western Sahara (currently controlled by Morocco). According to the CIA 100% of Mauritanian citizens are Muslim, although there is a small community of Christians, essentially of foreign nationality.

In 2004, the two largest Sufi Muslim tariqas in Mauritania were Tijaniyyah and Qadiriyya. There was no record of Sufis in the country in 2022.

Religion in Mauritania (ARDA 2025 est.)
1. Sunni (99.2%)
2. Ethnic Religion (0.46%)
3. Christianity (0.21%)
4. None (0.11%)

== History ==
It was trade with Muslim merchants that brought Islam into the region, in the 8th century.

The Almoravid dynasty rose to power in the western Maghreb during the 11th century, and proselytized Islam throughout the region. Members of the Gadala Berbers brought back the theologian Abdallah ibn Yasin from Mecca in 1035, where they travelled for the hajj, to expunge the paganism still prevalent in Mauritania. Although Islam had existed in the region prior to the Almoravids, Almoravid rule accelerated the spread of Islam and removed animist influences on local Islamic practices. Ibn Yasin's strict interpretation of Islam alienated many of the Berbers, and the theologian was expelled. Undaunted, he accumulated a devoted following of loyal believers and an army, the foundation of the Almoravid dynasty. Ibn Yasin's military expansion converted tribe members of the Gadala, Lemtuna, and Messufa Berbers of the region to Islam. The capture of Sijilmasa and Aoudaghost, important cities in the Trans-Saharan trade, allowed them to dominate the trade routes of the Sahara. The Almoravids converted the Berbers inhabiting modern-day Mauritania to the Maliki school of Sunni Islam, which remains dominant in Mauritania to this day.

Ibn Yasin was succeeded by Abu Bakr ibn Umar, a chieftain of the Lemtuna Berbers. Fighting between the Lemtuna and Messufa led ibn Umar to declare a holy war against the Ghana Empire to unify the tribes against a common enemy. The war, which lasted for fourteen years, spread Islam to the members of the Soninke people, founders of Ghana. The political influence of the Almoravids waned as the dynasty declined, but Islamic adherence was firmly cemented in the country.

The political influence of the Kunta tribe between the 16th and 18th centuries bolstered the popularity of Qadiri Sufism in the region. Between the 16th and 18th centuries, declaration of jihads by Muslim theologians pushed for the establishment of Islamic governance in West Africa. In the 17th century, Nasir al-Din led a jihad in Mauritania, drawing support from Berbers frustrated with the corruption of the region's Arab rulers.

The French colonial empire expanded into Mauritania by the early 20th century. The West African jihads were brought to an end, following crackdowns by British and French colonists. In an effort to thwart militarism and threats of rebellion, French colonial administrators encouraged the influence of zawiya, the religious tribes of Mauritania, over hassan, Mauritania's warrior tribes.

=== Post-independence ===
The country declared its independence in 1960 and established itself as an Islamic Republic. Independence brought Moktar Ould Daddah into power, who promoted Islam during his rule. A military coup d'état ousted Daddah in 1978. Colonel Mohamed Khouna Ould Haidalla, one of the participants of the coup, became Head of the government in 1980, and implemented Sharia law. President Maaouya Ould Sid'Ahmed Taya, successor of Ould Haidalla, reversed some of these changes, but was ousted in a military coup in 2005.

Political Islam, or Islamism, was introduced in the region during the 1970s. The instability that followed the coup that deposed Daddah invited elements of the Muslim Brotherhood, Wahabbism, and Tablighi Jamaat. The Islamists united as a political party in the 1980s, but were politically repressed starting in 1994. Government pressure on Islamist organizations continued throughout the 2000s. Funding by Saudi Arabia and other Gulf monarchies supported the establishment of Islamic schools, centers, and charities around the country, but were largely shut down by the government in 2003. In 2005, Islamists were arrested and accused of terrorism. Of the original eighty arrested, eighteen remained in prison by 2006.

== Denominations ==
=== Islam ===
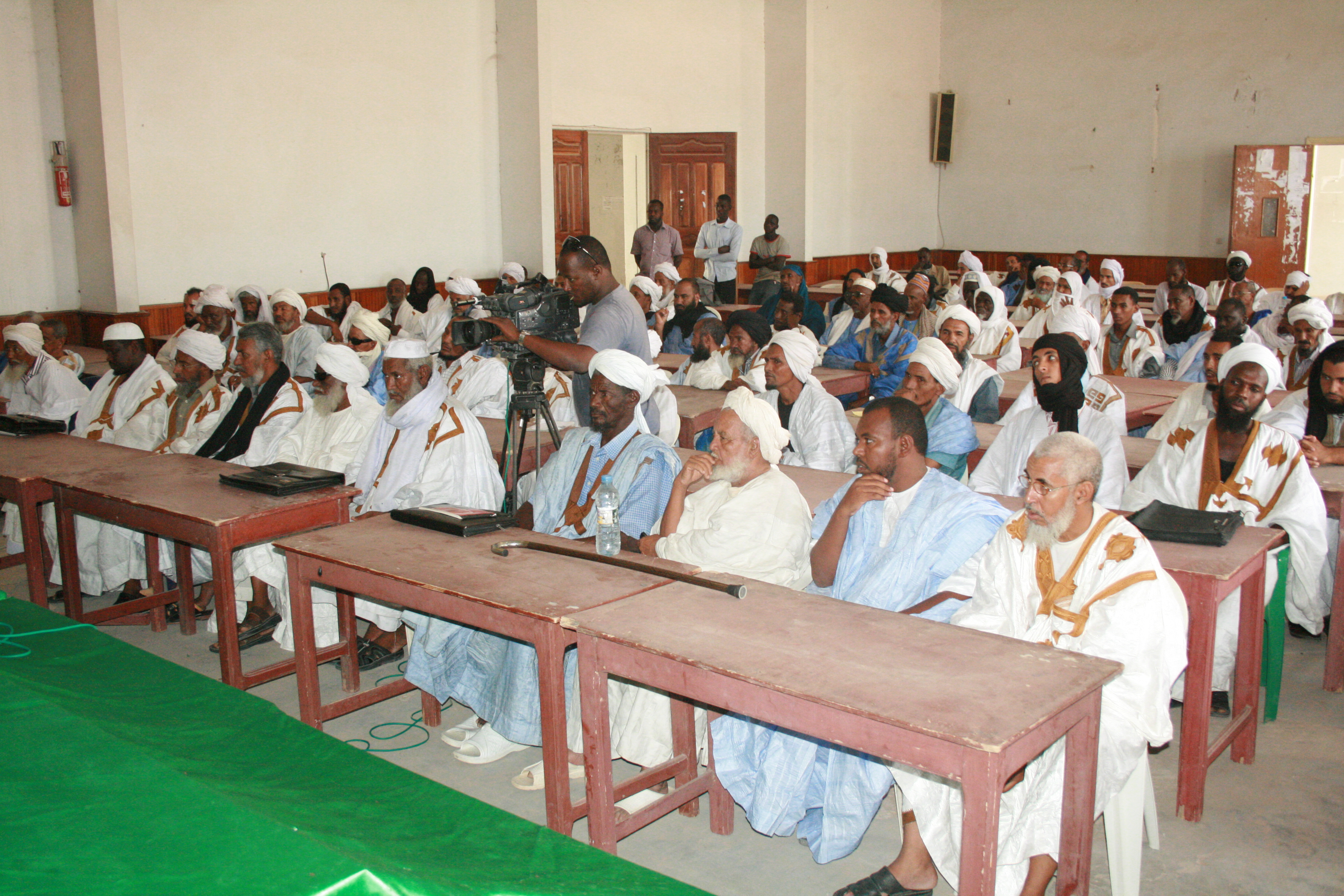
Imams in Mauritania

Islam is by far the largest and most influential religion in the country, and has been since the 10th century. According to government census, at the start of the 21st century, 100% of the country's citizens were Muslim. Like much of North Africa, Mauritanians follow the Maliki school of Islam.

Sharia is used as the basis of judicial decisions; the court system uses a combination of secular and Islamic laws.

=== Others ===
In 2020, the number of Christians in Mauritania was estimated at 10,000 (expatriates or foreigners); approximately 4,000 of these were Roman Catholics. There were also a small number of adherents of Judaism in the country.

== Government restrictions on religion ==
In Mauritania, religious and secular NGOs are granted tax exemption. Based on the sharia stance on apostasy, the government forbids converting Muslims to competing religions. The publication of religious materials that are not Islamic is restricted. Religious education is not considered mandatory.

=== Freedom of religion ===
In 2022, Freedom House rated Mauritania religious freedom as 2 out of 4, noting that while apostasy is a crime punishable by death, to date, no one has been executed for the crime. However, in April 2018, Parliament passed a new law that strengthens the existing death penalty punishment for certain blasphemy offenses.

== Literature ==
- Muriel Devey, « Terre d'islam », in La Mauritanie, Éd. Karthala, Paris, 2005, p. 45-55 ISBN 2-8458-6583-X
- Sakho Mamadou Dickall, La littérature religieuse mauritanienne, s. l., 1986, 127 p.
- Paul Marty, Études sur l'Islam maure, E. Leroux, Paris, 1916, 252 p.

== See also ==
- Islam in Mauritania
- Roman Catholicism in Mauritania
- Freedom of religion in Mauritania
