= Fattening room =

Practice in Nigeria

The fattening room is a practice in the Efik part of Nigeria whereby women or adolescent girls are kept away from their companions, societal interactions and also from performing their customary duties. This period may range from three months to seven years depending on the wealth of their father.

== Background ==
The purpose of the fattening room is to groom and raise girls or intended brides according to the traditional norms of the people. This is to enable them in taking care of their prospective husbands and their future homes. A fattening room is like a traditional school where the lady or bride is groomed into a good mother, a wife, with an overall good character, that will be attractive to men. Another perspective argues that the main purpose of the fattening room is used to create plump women. This is because the society that practice it believe that surplus flesh ensures greater chances of fertility and a healthy baby. For this reason, the maidens are fed on a variety of food and are taught new rituals and skills. The fattening room is also used as a retreat prior to a major social change in a person's life.

== Modern views ==
The practice of fattening room is dominantly practiced in South Eastern part of Nigeria, especially among the Efiks. This cultural practice is gradually waning down, though not entirely. However, it has become part of the tourist attractions among the Efiks. Younger generations are resisting the fattening room culture due to some practices like female genital mutilation, overfeeding the bride, and the length of time it takes to be in the fattening room. More so, this practice has been criticized to be associated with rituals that are not acceptable by Christians.

== See also ==
- Anaang people
- Leblouh
