= David Sarwer =

American clinical psychologist and obesity researcher

David B. Sarwer
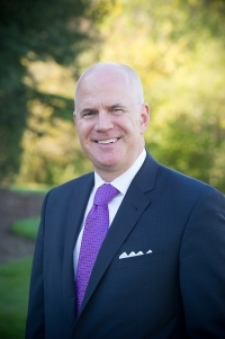
- Born: January 4, 1968 (age 58); Chicago, Illinois
- Citizenship: United States
- Education: Tulane University; Loyola University of Chicago
- Scientific career
- Fields: Psychology, Obesity, Bariatric Surgery
- Workplaces: University of Pennsylvania, Temple University

David B. Sarwer (born January 4, 1968, in Chicago, Illinois) is an American clinical psychologist who serves as the Associate Dean for Research, Director of the Center for Obesity Research and Education, and Professor of Social and Behavioral Sciences in the College of Public Health at Temple University.

== Education ==
Sarwer graduated from Forest View High School in Arlington Heights, Illinois in 1986. He received his B.A. in 1990 from Tulane University, graduating Summa Cum Laude, Phi Beta Kappa, and with Honors in Psychology. He subsequently received his M.A. in 1992 and his doctorate in Clinical Psychology in 1995 from Loyola University of Chicago. He then completed his internship year at the Medical College of Pennsylvania at Eastern Pennsylvania Psychiatric Institute in Philadelphia, Pennsylvania.

== Career ==
Sarwer began his career as a post-doctoral fellow at the Perelman School of Medicine at the University of Pennsylvania from 1995-1997. From 1997-2004, he served as Assistant Professor of Psychology in the Departments of Psychiatry and Surgery. He was promoted to Associate Professor in 2004 and Professor in 2012. While at Penn, he served as Director of Clinical Services at the Center for Weight and Eating Disorders, Director of the Stunkard Weight Management Program, as well as Consulting Psychologist to both the Center for Human Appearance and Division of Plastic Surgery at the Children's Hospital of Philadelphia. In 2015, he became Associate Dean for Research, Director of the Center for Obesity Research and Education, and Professor of Social and Behavioral Sciences in the College of Public Health at Temple University.

Much of Sarwer's work has focused on the psychosocial and behavioral aspects of extreme obesity and Bariatric surgery. His research has been funded by the National Institutes of Health since 2002. He was the founding Editor-in-Chief for the journal Obesity Science and Practice. He also serves as Senior Associate Editor for the journal Health Psychology, Associate Editor for the journal Obesity Surgery, and is on the Editorial Board of the American Psychologist, Childhood Obesity, and Surgery for the Treatment of Obesity and Related Diseases.

Sarwer also maintains a line of research on the psychological aspects of physical appearance and, more specifically, both reconstructive and cosmetic plastic surgery. Much of his early work in this area focused on the relationship between body image, body dysmorphic disorder, and cosmetic surgery. More recently, his work has focused more on physical disfigurement and reconstructive procedures. This includes several grants from the Department of Defense looking at the use of vascularized composite allotransplantation procedures to treat military veterans who have suffered devastating injures while in service to United States Military. Sarwer currently serves on the Editorial Board of the Aesthetic Surgery Journal and Plastic and Reconstructive Surgery.

== Selected publications ==
=== Books ===
- Sarwer, David B.; Pruzinsky, Thomas; Cash, Thomas F.; Goldwyn, Robert M.; Persing, John A.; Whitaker, Linton A. (2006). Psychological Aspects of Reconstructive and Cosmetic Plastic Surgery: Clinical, Empirical and Ethical Perspectives. Lippincott Williams & Wilkins. ISBN 978-0-7817-5362-3.
- Block, Andrew R.; Sarwer, David B. (2013). Presurgical Psychological Screening: Understanding Patients, Improving Outcomes. American Psychological Association. ISBN 978-1-4338-1242-2.
- Still CD, Sarwer DB, Blankenship J (eds). The SMBS Textbook of Bariatric Surgery. Volume 2: Integrative Health. Springer, New York, NY, 2014. ISBN 978-1493911967.

=== Obesity and bariatric surgery ===
- Gasoyan, H; Halpern, MT; Tajeu, G; Sarwer, DB (2019). "Impact of insurance plan design on bariatric surgery utilization". Surg Obes Relat Dis. 15 (10): 1812–1818. doi:10.1016/j.soard.2019.07.022. PMC 6834903. PMID 31515131.
- Parks, EP; Finnerty, DD; Panganiban, J; Frasso, R; Bishop-Gilyard, C; Tewksbury, CM; Williams, NN; Dumon, KR; Cordero, G; Hill, DL; Sarwer (2020). "a qualitative study". BMC Pediatrics. 20 (1): 96–102. doi:10.1186/s12887-020-1992-7. PMC 7050129. PMID 32122314.
- Gasoyan, H; Soans, R; Ibrahim, JK; Aaronson, WE; Sarwer, DB (2020). "Do Insurance-mandated Precertification Criteria and Insurance Plan Type Determine the Utilization of Bariatric Surgery Among Individuals With Private Insurance?". Medical Care. 58 (11): 952–957. doi:10.1097/MLR.0000000000001358. PMC 7572545. PMID 32868693.
- Brown, JC; Sarwer, DB; Troxel, AB; Sturgeon, K; DeMichele, AM; Delinger, CS; Schmitz, KH (2021). "A randomized trial of exercise and diet on body composition in survivors of breast cancer with overweight or obesity". Breast Cancer Research and Treatment. 189 (1): 145–154. doi:10.1007/s10549-021-06284-7. PMC 8316406. PMID 34089422.
- Brown, JC; Sarwer, DB; Troxel, AB; Sturgeon, K; DeMichele, AM; Delinger, CS; Schmitz, KH (2021). "A randomized trial of exercise and diet on health-related quality of life in survivors of breast cancer with overweight or obesity". Cancer. 127 (20): 3856–3864. doi:10.1002/cncr.33752. PMC 8478822. PMID 34161602.
- Gasoyan, H; Ibrahim, JK; Aaronson, WE; Sarwer, DB (2021). "The role of health insurance characteristics in utilization of bariatric surgery". Surgery for Obesity and Related Diseases. 17 (5): 728–734. doi:10.1016/j.soard.2021.01.024. PMC 8096659. PMID 33664010.
- Sarwer, DB; Wadden, TA; Ashare, RL; Spitzer, JC; McCuen-Wurst, C; LaGrotte, C; Williams, NN; Edwards, M; Tewksbury, C; Wu, J; Tajeu, G; Allison, KC (2021). "Psychopathology, disordered eating, and impulsivity in patients seeking bariatric surgery". Surgery for Obesity and Related Diseases. 17 (3): 516–524. doi:10.1016/j.soard.2020.11.005. PMC 8212387. PMID 33341423.
- Legro, RS; Hansen, KR; Diamond, MP; Steiner, AZ; Coutifaris, C; Cedars, MI; Hoeger, KM; Usadi, R; Johnstone, EB; Haisenleder, DJ; Wild, RA; Barnhart, KT; Mersereau, J; Trussell, JC; Krawetz, SA; Kris-Etherton, PM; Sarwer, DB; Santoro, N; Eisenberg, E; Huang, H; Zhang, HP (2022). "Reproductive Medicine Network. Effects of Preconception Lifestyle Intervention in Infertile Women with Obesity: The FIT-PLESE Randomized Controlled Trial". PLOS Medicine. 19 (1) e1003883. doi:10.1371/journal.pmed.1003883. PMC 8765626. PMID 35041662.
- Gasoyan, H; Soans, RS; Ibrahim, JK; Aaronson, WE; Sarwer, DB (2022). "Association Between Insurance-Mandated Precertification Criteria and Inpatient Healthcare Utilization During 1 Year After Bariatric Surgery". Surgery for Obesity and Related Diseases. 18 (2): 271–280. doi:10.1016/j.soard.2021.10.007. PMID 34753674.
- Allison, KC; Wu, JW; Spitzer, JC; McCuen-Wurst, C; Ashare, RL; Tewksbury, C; LaGrotte, CA; Wadden, TA; Williams, NN; Sarwer, DB (2023). "Changes in Eating Behaviors and Their Relation to Weight Change 6 and 12 Months after Bariatric Surgery". Obesity Surgery. 33 (3): 733–742. doi:10.1007/s11695-022-06442-w. PMC 9870778. PMID 36690865.

=== Body image and plastic surgery ===
- Jamrozik, A.; Oraa Ali, M.; Sarwer, D. B.; Chatterjee, A. (2019). "More than skin deep: Judgments of individuals with facial disfigurement". Psychology of Aesthetics, Creativity, and the Arts. 13 (1): 117–129. doi:10.1037/aca0000147.
- Hartung, F.; Jamrozik, A.; Rosen, M.E.; et al. (2019). "Behavioural and Neural Responses to Facial Disfigurement". Sci Rep. 9 (1) 8021. Bibcode:2019NatSR...9.8021H. doi:10.1038/s41598-019-44408-8. PMC 6541618. PMID 31142792.
- Patel, V; Mazzaferro, DM; Sarwer, DB; Bartlett, SP (2020). "Beauty and the Mask". Plastic and Reconstructive Surgery Global Open. 8 (8): 30–48. doi:10.1097/gox.0000000000003048. PMC 7489620. PMID 32983796.
- Crerand, CE; Rumsey, N; Kazak, A; Clarke, A; Rausch, J; Sarwer, DB (2020). "Sex differences in perceived stigmatization, body image disturbance, and satisfaction with facial appearance and speech among adolescents with craniofacial conditions". Body Image. 16: 190–198. doi:10.1016/j.bodyim.2020.01.005. PMC 8930279. PMID 32006855.
- Kelly, PJ; D'Avanzo, PA; Shanker, A; Suppes, K; Frankel, AS; Sarwer, DB (2023). "The Relationship Between Gender-Affirming Procedures, Body Image Quality of Life, and Gender Affirmation". Transgender Health. 8 (3): 293–297. doi:10.1089/trgh.2021.0081. PMC 10277993. PMID 37342481.
- Siminoff, LA; Alolod, GP; Davis, EE; McGregor, HR; Litsas, DC; Sarwer, DB; Mulvania, PA; Hasz, RD; Gardiner, HM (2022). "Evaluation of an eLearning System to Train Health Professionals to Communicate about Vascularized Composite Allotransplantation with Donor Families". Progress in Transplantation. 32 (3): 233–240. doi:10.1177/15269248221107040. PMID 35686350.
- Gardiner, HM; Davis, EE; Alolod, GP; Sarwer, DB; Siminoff, LA (2022). "A Mixed-Methods Examination of Public Attitudes Toward Vascularized Composite Allograft Donation and Transplantation". Sage Open Medicine. 10 20503121221125379. doi:10.1177/20503121221125379. PMC 9486253. PMID 36147872.
