= Leblouh =

Force-feeding of girls for marriage

Leblouh (Arabic: البلوح, romanized: lə-blūḥ ; French: gavage) is the practice of force-feeding girls from as young as five to nineteen, in countries where obesity was traditionally regarded as desirable. Especially prevalent in rural areas and having its roots in Tuareg tradition, leblouh is practiced to increase chances of marriage in a society where high body volume used to be a sign of wealth.

The practice occurs in several African countries, such as Mauritania, Niger, Uganda, Sudan, Nigeria, Kenya and South Africa. It used to be widespread across most of the Arab world as well.

The practice goes back to the 11th century, and has been reported to have made a significant comeback in Mauritania after a military junta took over the country in 2008. The younger generations in Mauritania view this practice negatively.

== Description ==
Older women called "fatteners" force the young girls to consume enormous quantities of food and liquid, inflicting pain on them if they do not eat and drink. One way of inflicting pain is to pinch a limb between two sticks. A six-year-old might typically be forced to drink 20 litres (4.4 imp gal; 5.3 US gal) of camel's milk, and eat two kilos of pounded millet mixed with two cups of butter, every day. Although the practice is abusive, mothers claim there is no other way to secure a good future for their children.

A similar practice is referred to in a folktale entitled "The Tortoise with a Pretty Daughter", collected in Folk Stories from Southern Nigeria (1910). The folklorist who wrote down the story explained the treatment of the "pretty daughter": "The fatting house is a room where a girl is kept for some weeks before her marriage. She is given plenty of food, and made as fat as possible, as fatness is looked upon as a great beauty by the Efik people and Bahumono."

== Leblouh in Mauritania ==
Leblouh (often referred to using the French word gavage) in Mauritania involves a months long process during which girls are forced to swallow gallons of milk, couscous, peanut oil, and cups of pure animal fat. An often cited statistic is that Mauritanian girls undergoing the process of Leblouh consume four times the amount of calories as an adult male bodybuilder who consumes on average 4,000 calories daily. During these months the child or young girl being fattened consumes on average 14,000 to 16,000 calories daily, while the recommended diet for a healthy 12-year old girl includes only 1,500 calories. Young girls are often fattened from around the age of 6 or 7 and are coerced using techniques which cause varying degrees of mental and physical anguish. If the young girls refuse to consume the on average 20 liters of milk a day that they are given, they are subjected to "toe squeezing" which involves the crushing of the toes using a contraption made of sticks, pinched on the skin, or even hit. Sources state that the most common reason for families investing in Leblouh for their young daughter is to ensure her financial security and good marriage prospects.

Gavage is much more common in the poorer and more resource deficient regions of Mauritania. These regions include the rural Saharan regions of the country, the rural areas along the Senegal River in the Sahelian region, along with the urban areas along the coast. In these regions, families are much more motivated to force-feed their daughters in the effort to draw wealthy suitors. It does not appear however, that gavaged women have greater wealth or access to resources than their non-gavaged counterparts.

The practice of fattening girls in Mauritania has been linked to harmful physical and psychological consequences. Leblouh has been correlated with significant reductions in movement and the development of cardiovascular diseases. The use of pills, in the form of steroids, to cause weight gain have been widely reported throughout the country. The increasing frequency of droughts has also caused a shortage of cows, camels, produce, and grain used to feed families and/or fatten girls. As a result, many families have been forced to sell their livestock because they can not afford to feed themselves. Many women and young girls have now turned to black market agricultural steroids to gain weight. The increasing levels of impoverishment in some areas of the country have also led some women and girls to discover that antihistamines, traditionally used to treat hay fever, have appetite inducing qualities. While these products are still dangerous, they are much more accessible and can be purchased over-the-counter. Women who have undergone Leblouh are also at a consistently higher risk of initiating sex earlier and having children earlier than their counterparts who were not gavaged. Gavage may also put women at serious risk for poor childbirth outcomes, HIV/AIDS, and other health issues, above and beyond the impact of BMI that itself constitutes a physical health risk. Also, there seems to be a strong correlation between gavage and early pregnancy as early pregnancy is more common among poor young women.

=== Origins of leblouh and revival ===
It is difficult to precisely pinpoint the origins of force-feeding in Mauritania. However, some historians believe that the practice is centuries old and dates back to a time when most Mauritanians were nomads. In this nomadic society, obesity was seen as a sign of beauty in women and the wives of rich men would often not work and sit in tents while black enslaved people did the hard labor that the desert required. Mauritania is a society that even today is governed by two distinct populations: the light-skinned Moors and the dark-skinned Africans whose roots are largely sub-Saharan. Mauritanians who identify as Arabs still have the highest rates of Leblouh in the country when compared to the nation's minority groups.

The 21st century however has been a time for the revival of Leblouh in Mauritania, as well as a time for reform. In 2005, the head of President Ould Taya’s presidential guard, Ely Ould Mohamed Vall led a coup with the promise of free and fair elections in 2006. In 2006 and 2007, democratic, free and transparent elections occurred for the first time in Mauritania. After just two years of democracy and a period of serious institutional crisis with several changes to government and the presentation of a motion of censorship by a group of deputies, General Ould Abdel Aziz seized power by force after a new political coup in 2008. This coup occurred in August 2008, and the democratic government was subsequently replaced with a military junta that favored what they called "a return to tradition." An election in July 2009 allowed the military junta to maintain control of the government. After this election a slew of legislation was enacted focusing on reinstating traditional rules into law, despite claims of massive vote-rigging. Mint Ely, a women's rights campaigner, describes: "We had a Ministry of Women's Affairs. ... We had female diplomats and governors. The military set us back by decades, sending us back to our traditional roles. We no longer even have a ministry to talk to."

Government figures from prior to the 2008 coup indicate that gavage occurred in 50–60 percent of the women in rural areas and 20–30 percent of the women in urban areas. After the coup, professional force-feeders estimate that approximately 80 percent of women nation-wide have undergone some form of Leblouh.

=== Attitudes towards leblouh in Mauritania and abroad ===
Data from the Mauritania 2000–2001 DHS was used to determine the attitudes of men and women in regards to the continuation of female genital mutilation and gavage. The analysis found that the majority of both female and male respondents favored the continuation of the practice (64% and 70%, respectively). It also found that almost a quarter (23%) of women reported being force fed as a child and 32% of women and 29% of men approved the continuation of the practice. While the prevalence of gavage is clearly quite high, the harming of the genital organs of any child (including harm resulting from the practice of gavage and FGM) is illegal under the Mauritanian child protection penal code; penalties range from 1 to 3 years' imprisonment and heavy fines. The law, however, does not specifically mention FGM or gavage as illicit practices that harm young children.

Attitudes in Mauritania do seem to be changing however with global influences, such as Western fashions, Nigerian pop music, and French TV altering the perceptions of body size and women's beauty. Lebanese music is popular throughout the Middle East and Mauritanian men have begun to compare Mauritanian women to popular Lebanese singers, showing that attitudes may be changing in the country even among men.

International organizations and NGOs have also become increasingly interested in what they see as a peculiar and abusive cultural practice. The idea that traditional fattening customs have now morphed into cases where young women routinely ingest dangerous animal growth hormones and steroids has caught the attention of organizations such as Equality Now.

== In Islam ==
=== In Sunnism ===
The practice is described favorably in the Sunni Hadith collection Sunan ibn Majah, narrated by Aisha bint Abi Bakr, the narration goes as follows:

‘Aishah said: “My mother was trying to fatten me up when she wanted to send me to the Messenger of Allah ﷺ, but nothing worked until I ate cucumbers [together] with dates; then I grew plump like the best kind of plump.”

— ibn Majah al-Qazwini, Sunan ibn Majah, 3324

=== In Shi'ism ===
The Shia Hadith work Kitab al-Faqih also makes a reference to the preferability of fattened women:

The Messenger of Allah ﷺ, when intending to marry a woman, would send someone to look at her and said: "Smell from her neck, for if her neck smells good, her scent will also be pleasant. And if her ankles are plump, her physique will be plump."

— Ibn Babawayh al-Qummi, Kitab al-Faqih, 3:3:11:2

== See also ==
- Fat fetishism
- Fattening room
