= Islam in Mauritania =

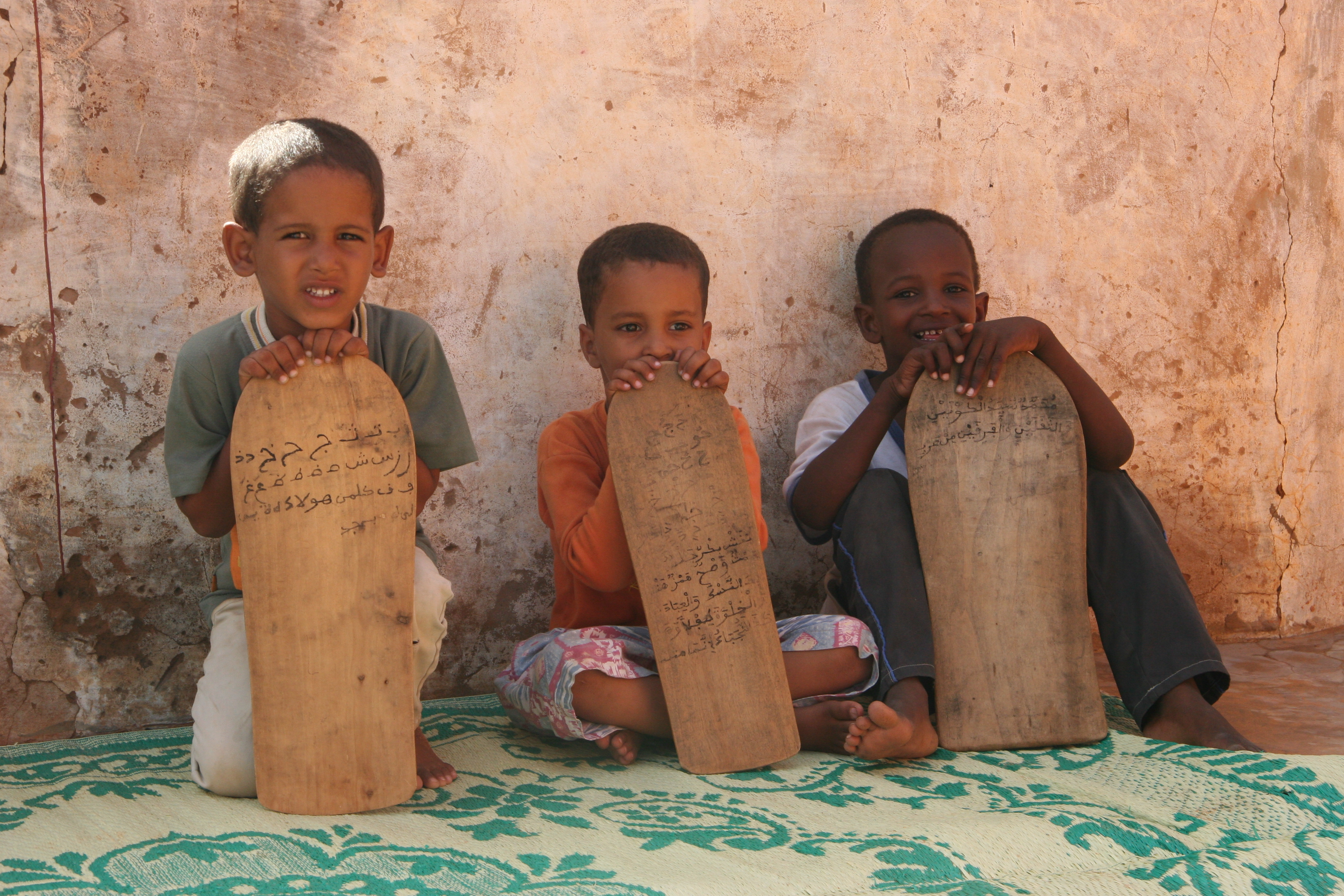
Boys taking Qur'an lessons in Mauritania

Virtually all Mauritanians are Sunni Muslims. They adhere to the Maliki madhhab, one of the four Sunni schools of law. Since independence in 1960, Mauritania has been an Islamic republic. The Constitutional Charter of 1985 declares Islam the state religion and sharia the law of the land.

== History ==
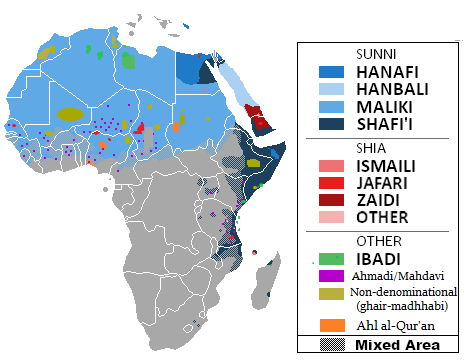
Mauritania mostly colored baby blue (Maliki Sunni).

=== Early Islamization ===
Arab Muslim presence in the region dates back to the Umayyad period, when forces entering North Africa pushed southward into the western Sahara. By the late 7th century, Umayyad incursions had reached what is now Mauritania.

The spread of Islam among the local Berber populations was gradual and complex. While many Berber tribes adopted Islam relatively early, others resisted Arab domination and migrated eastward toward the Gao region in present-day Mali. Over the following centuries, Islam became deeply rooted through trade routes linking the Maghreb, al-Andalus, and the Sahel.

=== Medieval and pre-colonial developments ===
Between the 11th and 17th centuries, Islamic scholarship flourished in the region. Centers such as Chinguetti, sometimes referred to as the “City of Libraries,” became pillars of Qur’anic education and Maliki jurisprudence. Scholars, jurists, and tribal leaders maintained networks of learning that tied Mauritania into broader Islamic intellectual traditions. Islam also became intertwined with tribal authority structures, influencing both political and social organization.

== Sufi brotherhoods ==
By the 1980s, two major Sufi orders accounted for nearly all brotherhood membership in Mauritania:

=== Qadiriyya ===
One of the oldest Sufi orders in the Islamic world, the Qadiriyya in Mauritania emphasizes spiritual discipline, devotion through dhikr, and respect for scholarly lineage. It is widespread across multiple regions and has historically been associated with prominent marabout families.

=== Tijaniyya ===
Founded in North Africa in the 18th century, the Tijaniyya became especially influential in West Africa. In Mauritania, it appeals to both scholars and lay followers, emphasizing structured litanies (wird) and practices aimed at spiritual purification. Despite differences in ritual emphasis, its doctrinal foundation is similar to that of the Qadiriyya.

=== Smaller orders ===
Two lesser but locally important brotherhoods also exist:

Shadhiliyya – centered in Boumdeït in the Assaba Region, known for its spiritual retreats and emphasis on inward reflection.

Goudfiyya – found primarily in Tagant, Adrar, and the Hodh regions, with practices adapted to local social structures and nomadic traditions.

== Contemporary practice ==
Today, Islam remains central to Mauritanian identity, influencing law, education, and social norms. Qur’anic schools (mahādhir) are widespread, and many families send children to study memorization and classical Arabic. Large religious festivals, mosque-building initiatives, and gatherings continue to shape community life.

Although debates on reform, modernity, and religious authority occasionally surface, Mauritania remains one of the most religiously homogeneous countries in the world, with Islam serving as a shared framework across ethnic and social divides.

== Responses to reform movements ==
The landscape of Islamic thought in Mauritania has at times included tensions with reformist or heterodox movements. Although the Ahmadiyya movement has a significant presence in parts of West Africa, it has struggled to gain acceptance in Mauritania. In 1976, during a meeting of the African Muslim Congress held in Mauritania, delegates urged African governments to classify Ahmadis as non-Muslims, a call that ultimately had limited regional impact.

More recently, small Salafi and reformist currents have emerged, influenced by global Islamic trends. However, Mauritania remains overwhelmingly Maliki-Sunni in orientation, with Sufi traditions retaining substantial cultural weight.

== See also ==
- Islam by country
- Religion in Mauritania
