= List of mental disorders =

The following is a list of mental disorders as defined at any point by any of the two most prominent systems of classification of mental disorders, namely the Diagnostic and Statistical Manual of Mental Disorders (DSM) or the International Classification of Diseases (ICD).

A mental disorder, also known as a mental illness, mental health condition, or psychiatric disorder, is characterized by a pattern of behavior or mental function that significantly impairs personal functioning or causes considerable distress.

The DSM, a classification and diagnostic guide published by the American Psychiatric Association, includes over 450 distinct definitions of mental disorders. Meanwhile, the ICD, published by the World Health Organization, stands as the international standard for categorizing all medical conditions, including sections on mental and behavioral disorders.

Revisions and updates are periodically made to the diagnostic criteria and descriptions in the DSM and ICD to reflect current understanding and consensus within the mental health field. The list includes conditions currently recognized as mental disorders according to these systems. There is ongoing debate among mental health professionals, including psychiatrists, about the definitions and criteria used to delineate mental disorders. There is particular concern over whether certain conditions should be classified as "mental illnesses" or might more accurately be described as neurological disorders or in other terms.

== Anxiety disorders ==
- Agoraphobia
- Generalized anxiety disorder
- Panic disorder
- Selective mutism
- Separation anxiety disorder
- Specific phobia
- Social anxiety disorder
- Anxiety due to another medical condition
- Substance/medication-induced anxiety disorder
- Other specified anxiety disorder
- Unspecified anxiety disorder

== Dissociative disorders ==
- Dissociative identity disorder
- Dissociative amnesia (formerly psychogenic amnesia)
- Depersonalization/derealization disorder
- Dissociative amnesia with dissociative fugue
- Dissociative neurological symptom disorder (including psychogenic non-epileptic seizures)
- Other specified dissociative disorder (OSDD)
- Unspecified dissociative disorder
- Ganser syndrome [outdated]

== Mood disorders ==
=== Depressive disorders ===
- Disruptive mood dysregulation disorder
- Major depressive disorder (all types included)
- Persistent depressive disorder (dysthymia)
- Premenstrual dysphoric disorder
- Postpartum depression
- Psychotic depression
- Recurrent brief depression
- Other specified depressive disorder
- Unspecified depressive disorder

=== Bipolar disorders ===
- Bipolar I disorder
- Bipolar II disorder
- Bipolar and related disorder due to another medical condition
- Substance/medication-induced bipolar and related disorders
- Other specified and related bipolar disorder
- Unspecified bipolar and related disorder
- Cyclothymia
- Hypomania
- Mania
- Mixed affective state
- Unspecified mood disorder

== Trauma- and stressor-related disorders ==
- Reactive attachment disorder
- Disinhibited social engagement disorder
- Post-traumatic stress disorder (PTSD)
- Post-traumatic embitterment disorder (PTED)
- Acute stress disorder
- Adjustment disorders
- Complex post-traumatic stress disorder (C-PTSD)
- Prolonged grief disorder
- Other specified trauma- and stressor-related disorder
- Unspecified trauma- and stressor-related disorder

== Neuro-developmental disorders ==
- Intellectual developmental disorder
- Language disorder
- Sensory processing disorder
- Speech sound disorder
- Childhood-onset fluency disorder (stuttering)
- Aphasia
- Social (pragmatic) communication disorder
- Pervasive developmental disorder [outdated]
- Auditory processing disorder
- Communication disorder
- Autism spectrum disorder
- Attention-deficit/hyperactivity disorder (ADHD)
- Developmental coordination disorder (dyspraxia)
- Stereotypic movement disorder
- Tourette syndrome
- Down syndrome
- Tic disorders (all types included)
- Specific learning disorder with impairment in reading (dyslexia)
- Specific learning disorder with impairment in mathematics (dyscalculia)
- Specific learning disorder with impairment in written expression (dysgraphia)
- Nonverbal learning disorder (NVLD, NLD)
- Other specified neurodevelopmental disorder
- Unspecified neurodevelopmental disorder

== Sleep-wake disorders ==
- Insomnia (including chronic insomnia and short-term insomnia)
- Hypersomnolence
  - Idiopathic hypersomnolence
- Kleine–Levin syndrome
- Insufficient sleep syndrome
- Narcolepsy
  - Cataplexy
- Sleep-related hypoventilation
- Restless legs syndrome
- Sleep apnea (all types included)
- Night terrors (sleep terrors)
- Exploding head syndrome
- Other specified sleep-wake disorder
- Unspecified sleep-wake disorder

=== Parasomnias ===
- Nightmare disorder
- Non-rapid eye movement sleep arousal disorders
  - Somnambulism (sleepwalking)
- Rapid eye movement sleep behavior disorder
- Confusional arousals
- Sleep-related hallucination
  - Hypnagogic hallucinations
  - Hypnopompic hallucinations

=== Circadian rhythm sleep disorder ===
- Circadian rhythm sleep disorder
- Delayed sleep phase disorder
- Advanced sleep phase disorder
- Irregular sleep–wake rhythm
- Non-24-hour sleep–wake disorder
- Circadian rhythm sleep-wake disorder caused by irregular work shifts
- Jet lag

== Neurocognitive disorders ==
- Delirium
- Dementia (applies in "major" cases)
  - Major or mild neurocognitive disorder due to Alzheimer's disease
  - Major or mild neurocognitive disorder with Lewy bodies
  - Major or mild vascular neurocognitive disorder
  - Major or mild frontotemporal neurocognitive disorder
  - Major or mild neurocognitive disorder due to Parkinson's disease
  - Major or mild neurocognitive disorder due to prion disease
  - Major or mild neurocognitive disorder due to Huntington's disease
  - Major or mild neurocognitive disorder due to another medical condition
  - Major or mild neurocognitive disorder due to multiple etiologies
  - Major or mild neurocognitive disorder due to traumatic brain injury
  - Major or mild neurocognitive disorder due to HIV infection/HIV-associated neurocognitive disorder (HAND)
  - Chronic traumatic encephalopathy
  - Unspecified neurocognitive disorder
- Amnesia (all types includes)
- Agnosia

== Substance-related and addictive disorders ==
=== Substance-related disorders ===
- Substance-induced disorder (Substance-induced psychosis, Substance-induced delirium, Substance-induced mood disorder)
- Substance intoxication
- Substance withdrawal
- Substance dependence

==== Disorders due to use of alcohol ====
- Alcohol use disorder
- Alcoholic hallucinosis
- Alcohol withdrawal
- Harmful pattern of use of alcohol

==== Disorders due to use of cannabis ====
- Cannabis use disorder
- Cannabis dependence
- Cannabis intoxication
- Harmful pattern of use of cannabis
- Cannabis withdrawal
- Cannabis-induced delirium
- Cannabis-induced psychotic disorder
- Cannabis-induced mood disorder
- Cannabis-induced anxiety

==== Disorders due to use of synthetic cannabinoids ====
- Episode of harmful use of synthetic cannabinoids
- Harmful pattern of use of synthetic cannabinoids
- Synthetic cannabinoid dependence
- Synthetic cannabinoid intoxication
- Synthetic cannabinoids withdrawal
- Synthetic cannabinoids induced delirium
- Synthetic cannabinoids induced psychotic disorder
- Synthetic cannabinoids induced mood disorder
- Synthetic cannabinoids induced anxiety

==== Disorders due to use of opioids ====
- Episode of harmful use of opioids
- Harmful pattern of use of opioids
- Opioid dependence
- Opioid intoxication
- Opioids withdrawal
- Opioids induced delirium
- Opioids induced psychotic disorder
- Opioids induced mood disorder
- Opioids induced anxiety

==== Disorders due to use of sedative, hypnotic or anxiolytic ====
- Episode of harmful use of sedative, hypnotic or anxiolytic
- Harmful pattern of use of sedative, hypnotic or anxiolytic
- Sedative, hypnotic or anxiolytic dependence
- Sedative, hypnotic or anxiolytic intoxication
- Sedative, hypnotic or anxiolytic withdrawal
- Sedative, hypnotic or anxiolytic induced delirium
- Sedative, hypnotic or anxiolytic induced psychotic disorder
- Sedative, hypnotic or anxiolytic induced mood disorder
- Sedative, hypnotic or anxiolytic induced anxiety
- Amnestic disorder due to use of sedatives, hypnotics or anxiolytics
- Dementia due to use of sedatives, hypnotics or anxiolytics

==== Disorders due to use of cocaine ====
- Episode of harmful use of cocaine
- Harmful pattern of use of cocaine
- Cocaine dependence
- Cocaine intoxication
- Cocaine withdrawal
- Cocaine induced delirium
- Cocaine induced psychotic disorder
- Cocaine induced mood disorder
- Cocaine induced anxiety
- Cocaine induced OCD
- Cocaine induced impulse control disorder

==== Disorders due to use of amphetamines ====
- Episode of harmful use of amphetamines
- Harmful pattern of use of amphetamines
- Amphetamines dependence
- Amphetamines intoxication
- Amphetamines withdrawal
- Amphetamines induced delirium
- Amphetamines induced psychotic disorder
- Amphetamines induced mood disorder
- Amphetamines induced anxiety
- Amphetamines induced OCD
- Amphetamines induced impulse control disorder

==== Disorders due to use of synthetic cathinone ====
- Episode of harmful use of synthetic cathinone
- Harmful pattern of use of synthetic cathinone
- Synthetic cathinone dependence
- Synthetic cathinone intoxication
- Synthetic cathinone withdrawal
- Synthetic cathinone induced delirium
- Synthetic cathinone-induced psychotic disorder
- Synthetic cathinone-induced mood disorder
- Synthetic cathinone induced anxiety
- Synthetic cathinone induced OCD
- Synthetic cathinone induced impulse control disorder

==== Disorders due to use of caffeine ====
- Episode of harmful use of caffeine
- Harmful pattern of use of caffeine
- Caffeine intoxication
- Caffeine withdrawal
- Caffeine induced anxiety disorder
- Caffeine-induced sleep disorder

==== Disorders due to use of hallucinogens ====
- Episode of harmful use of hallucinogens
- Harmful pattern of use of hallucinogens
- Hallucinogen dependence
- Hallucinogen-induced delirium
- Hallucinogen-induced psychotic disorder
- Hallucinogen-induced anxiety disorder
- Hallucinogen-induced mood disorder
- Hallucinogen persisting perception disorder

==== Disorders due to use of nicotine ====
- Episode of harmful use of nicotine
- Harmful pattern of use of nicotine
- Nicotine intoxication
- Nicotine withdrawal
- Nicotine dependence

==== Disorders due to use of volatile inhalants ====
- Episode of harmful use of volatile inhalants
- Harmful pattern of use of volatile inhalants
- Volatile inhalants withdrawal
- Volatile inhalants induced delirium
- Volatile inhalants induced psychotic disorder
- Volatile inhalants induced mood disorder
- Volatile inhalants induced anxiety

==== Disorders due to use of dissociative drugs including ketamine and phencyclidine (PCP) ====
- Episode of harmful use of dissociative drugs including ketamine and phencyclidine (PCP)
- Harmful pattern of use of dissociative drugs including ketamine and phencyclidine (PCP)
- Dissociative drugs including ketamine and phencyclidine [PCP] dependence
- Dissociative drugs including ketamine and phencyclidine [PCP] intoxication
- Dissociative drugs including ketamine and phencyclidine [PCP] withdrawal
- Dissociative drugs including ketamine and phencyclidine [PCP] induced delirium
- Dissociative drugs including ketamine and phencyclidine [PCP] induced psychotic disorder
- Dissociative drugs including ketamine and phencyclidine [PCP] induced mood disorder
- Dissociative drugs including ketamine and phencyclidine [PCP] induced anxiety

=== Non-substance related disorder ===
- Addictive personality
- Gambling disorder
- Video game addiction
- Internet addiction disorder
- Sexual addiction
- Food addiction
- Exercise addiction
- Addiction to social media
- Pornography addiction
- Shopping addiction

== Paraphilias ==
- Voyeurism
- Exhibitionistic disorder
- Frotteuristic disorder
- Pedophilia
- Compulsive sexual behaviour
- Erotic target location error
- Sexual masochism
- Sexual sadism
- Fetishistic disorder
- Transvestic disorder
- Other specified paraphilic disorder

== Somatic symptom related disorders ==
- Illness anxiety disorder (hypochondriasis)
- Somatic symptom disorder
- Functional neurological symptom disorder (conversion disorder)
- Factitious disorder imposed on self (Munchausen syndrome)
- Factitious disorder imposed on another (Munchausen by proxy)
- Psychological factors affecting other medical conditions
- Other specified somatic symptom and related disorder
- Unspecified somatic symptom and related disorder

Sexual dysfunctions

- Anorgasmia/female orgasmic disorder
- Delayed ejaculation
- Dyspareunia
- Erectile disorder/dysfunction
- Female sexual interest/arousal disorder
- Genito-pelvic pain disorder (vaginismus)
- Hypoactive sexual desire disorder
- Male hypoactive sexual desire disorder
- Persistent genital arousal disorder
- Premature (early) ejaculation
- Sexual arousal disorder
- Sexual dysfunction
- Substance/medication-induced sexual dysfunction
- Other specified sexual dysfunction
- Unspecified sexual dysfunction

== Elimination disorders ==
- Enuresis (involuntary urination)
- Nocturnal enuresis
- Encopresis (involuntary defecation)
- Other specified elimination disorders
- Unspecified elimination disorder

== Feeding and eating disorders ==
- Pica (disorder)
- Rumination syndrome
- Avoidant/restrictive food intake disorder
- Anorexia nervosa
- Binge-eating disorder
- Bulimia nervosa
- Other specified feeding or eating disorder (OSFED)
  - Purging disorder
  - Night eating syndrome
  - Atypical anorexia nervosa
  - Diabulimia [unofficial]
  - Orthorexia nervosa [unofficial]
- Unspecified feeding or eating disorder

== Disruptive impulse-control, and conduct disorders ==
- Intermittent explosive disorder
- Oppositional defiant disorder
- Conduct disorder
- Antisocial personality disorder
- Pyromania
- Kleptomania
- Mythomania [unofficial]
- Other specified disruptive impulse-control, and conduct disorders
- Unspecified disruptive impulse-control, and conduct disorders

== Obsessive-compulsive and related disorders ==
- Obsessive–compulsive disorder (OCD)
- Body dysmorphic disorder
- Body integrity dysphoria
- Trichotillomania (hair-pulling disorder)
- Excoriation disorder (dermatillomania/skin-picking disorder)
- Body-focused repetitive behavior disorder
- Olfactory reference syndrome
- Phantom limb syndrome
- Primarily obsessional obsessive-compulsive disorder
- Hoarding disorder
- Obsessive-compulsive and related disorder due to another medical condition
- Substance/medication-induced obsessive-compulsive and related disorder
- Other specified obsessive-compulsive and related disorder
- Unspecified obsessive-compulsive and related disorder

== Schizophrenia spectrum and other psychotic disorders ==
- Brief psychotic disorder
- Delusional disorder
- Delusional misidentification syndrome
- Paraphrenia
- Psychosis
- Schizophrenia
- Schizoaffective disorder
- Schizophreniform disorder
- Schizotypal personality disorder
- Shared delusional disorder
- Postpartum psychosis
- Psychotic disorder due to another medical condition
- Substance/medication-induced psychotic disorder
- Other schizophrenia spectrum and other psychotic disorder
- Unspecified schizophrenia spectrum and other psychotic disorder
- Catatonia (all subtypes included)

== Personality disorders ==
=== DSM-5-TR classification ===
==== Cluster A (Odd, Eccentric) ====
- Paranoid personality disorder
- Schizoid personality disorder
- Schizotypal personality disorder

==== Cluster B (Dramatic, Erratic) ====
- Antisocial personality disorder
- Borderline personality disorder
- Histrionic personality disorder
- Narcissistic personality disorder

==== Cluster C (Fearful, Anxious) ====
- Avoidant personality disorder
- Dependent personality disorder
- Obsessive–compulsive personality disorder

==== Other personality disorders ====
- Other specified personality disorder
- Unspecified personality disorder
- Personality change due to another medical condition

=== ICD-11 classification ===
==== Personality disorder ====
- Mild personality disorder
- Moderate personality disorder
- Severe personality disorder
- Personality disorder, severity unspecified

==== Prominent personality traits or patterns ====
- Negative affectivity in personality disorder or personality difficulty
- Detachment in personality disorder or personality difficulty
- Dissociality in personality disorder or personality difficulty
- Disinhibition in personality disorder or personality difficulty
- Anankastia in personality disorder or personality difficulty
- Borderline pattern

=== Former diagnoses ===
- Depressive personality disorder
- Haltlose personality disorder
- Immature personality disorder
- Passive–aggressive personality disorder
- Sadistic personality disorder
- Self-defeating personality disorder

== Other ==
- Gender dysphoria (also known as gender integrity disorder or gender incongruence; there are different categorizations for children and non-children in both the DSM-5-TR the ICD-11)
- Medication-induced movement disorders and other adverse effects of medication
- Culture-bound syndrome

== Conditions for Further Study (From DSM-5-TR) ==
- Attenuated psychosis syndrome
- Depressive episodes with short-duration hypomania
- Caffeine use disorder
- Internet gaming disorder
- Neurobehavioral disorder associated with prenatal alcohol exposure
- Suicidal behaviour disorder
- Nonsuicidal self-injury disorder

== See Also ==
- List of neurological conditions and disorders
- International Classification of Diseases by the World Health Organization
