= Cognitive behavioral treatment of eating disorders =

- Specialty: Psychiatry
- [edit on Wikidata]

Cognitive behavioral therapy (CBT) is derived from both the cognitive and behavioral schools of psychology and focuses on the alteration of thoughts and actions with the goal of treating various disorders. The cognitive behavioral treatment of eating disorders emphasizes on the minimization of negative thoughts about body image and the act of eating, and attempts to alter negative and harmful behaviors that are involved in and perpetuate eating disorders. It also encourages the ability to tolerate negative thoughts and feelings as well as the ability to think about food and body perception in a multi-dimensional way. The emphasis is not only placed on altering cognition, but also on tangible practices like making goals and being rewarded for meeting those goals. CBT is a "time-limited and focused approach" which means that it is important for the patients of this type of therapy to have particular issues that they want to address when they begin treatment. CBT has also proven to be one of the most effective treatments for eating disorders.

== CBT-Enhanced ==
A common form of CBT that is used to treat eating disorders is called CBT-Enhanced (CBT-E) and was developed by Christopher G. Fairburn throughout the 1970s and 1980s. Originally intended for bulimia nervosa specifically, it was eventually extended to all eating disorders. Within Fairburn's enhanced CBT is CBT-Ef, designed to deal particularly with eating habits, and CBT-Eb for other issues that do not directly involve eating. A study which compared two different types of cognitive-behavioral treatments for the patients with eating disorders was conducted. Out of the two targeted treatment approaches, one solely focused on eating disorder features and the other one which was a more complex form of treatment also addressed mood intolerance, clinical perfectionism, low self-esteem and interpersonal difficulties. This study was done involving 154 patients with DSM-IV eating disorders. This involved 20 weeks of treatment and 60 weeks period of closed follow up and the outcomes were measured by independent assessors who had no ideas about the treatment conditions. As a result, the patients with control conditions exhibited little change in symptom severity whereas the ones in two treatment conditions exhibited substantial and equivalent change which was even maintained during the follow-up weeks. The eating disorder diagnoses did not affect the treatment. Patients with marked mood intolerance, clinical perfectionism, low self esteem or interpersonal difficulties appeared to respond better to the more complex form of treatment and the remaining patients showed a reverse pattern. As a conclusion, these two were considered to be the most suitable forms of treatment for the patients with eating disorders. The first one is viewed as the most default version of treatment and the second one is reserved for patients with marked additional psychopathology of the type targeted by the treatment.

There have been numerous researches done to compare the effectiveness of Cognitive-behavioral therapy over the Interpersonal psychotherapy. These researches conclude that Cognitive-behavioral therapy is more effective in treating eating disorders as compared to Interpersonal psychotherapy. One study also showed that Interpersonal psychotherapy may be as effective as Cognitive-behavioral therapy, however the interpersonal psychotherapy may be slower to reach its effects. CBT is notably more fast and rapid in generating improvement symptoms in patients with Bulimia nervosa, Anorexia nervosa and Binge eating disorder as compared to interpersonal psychotherapy. Therefore, CBT should be considered for treating eating disorders over interpersonal psychotherapy. The results of the study are evident that cognitive-behavioral therapy is significantly faster than IPT in ameliorating the primary symptoms of bulimia nervosa.

Per this study, Cognitive-behavioral therapy is more effective than interpersonal psychotherapy in modifying the disturbed attitudes to shape and weight, extreme attempts to diet, and self-induced vomiting. Cognitive-behavioral therapy is also more effective than behavior therapy in modifying the disturbed attitudes to shape and weight and extreme dieting, but it was equivalent in other respects. The findings suggest that cognitive behavior therapy, when applied to patients with bulimia nervosa, operates through mechanisms specific to this treatment and is more effective than both interpersonal psychotherapy and a simplified behavioral version of cognitive behavior therapy.

== Bulimia nervosa ==
CBT is the best treatment for bulimia nervosa, as indicated by a number of studies including one from the UK National Institute for Health and Clinical Excellence. Enhanced CBT is delivered on an individual basis and usually in an outpatient situation and is meant to help with the psychopathology of the eating disorder rather than the diagnosis itself. Research demonstrates that antidepressants may be an effective alternative to CBT for treatment of eating disorders; however, CBT continues to prove more effective than antidepressants specifically for the treatment of bulimia nervosa. A small study on patients with bulimia combined CBT with text-messaging a therapist about the frequency of binge-purge behaviours and the strength of the patient's desires to binge and purge. The number of binge eating and purging episodes decreased significantly from base-line to post-treatment and followup.

== Anorexia nervosa ==
Less research has been conducted on the effectiveness of CBT for those with anorexia nervosa, but a recent study demonstrated that CBT was effective for 60% of the subjects tested – 60% of those for whom CBT was effective were improved upon receiving the treatment. In addition, the US National Guideline Clearinghouse reported that CBT can alleviate symptoms of depression and compulsivity that are associated with anorexia nervosa. With 40% of adults and 60% of adolescents attaining and retaining a normal body weight, CBT treatment has proved to be more workable and favorable treatment for the individuals with Anorexia Nervosa. Patients reach and maintain minimum remaining psychopathological symptoms, in cases of over half the adults and about 80% of adolescents patients. Adolescents can more effectively and rapidly regain weight in comparisons with the adults. Therefore, they have better chances to get efficiently treated from these short-term treatment programs. Consequently, the adolescents with eating disorders are recommended to take CBT-E as one of the evidence-based psychological interventions, by the NHS England "The Access and Waiting Time Standard for Children and Young People with an Eating Disorder".

== Binge-eating disorder ==
The same type of CBT used for bulimia nervosa has demonstrated that it can be helpful in the treatment of binge-eating disorder. However, one of the problems with administering CBT to those with this disorder is that it does not traditionally encourage weight loss. This can be problematic for the portion of the population of binge-eaters, who are overweight or obese. As a result of issues like these CBT has not yet been established as the most effective treatment for binge-eating disorder. A commonly used alternative is behavioral weight loss because it prioritizes physical health by maintaining a healthy weight.

The CBT representation model includes altering eating routines, which includes retaining and maintaining eating timetable along with weekly recording the weighing sessions. During tempting and triggering circumstances, the CBT patients are encouraged to look for substitutes and include reasonable behaviors instead of binge eating. They master some exercises which help them understand the relationship of their moods to their cravings for food. This also assists them in seeing weight in a healthy way. CBT also aims at relapse prevention besides strengthening patient's relationships with their family and peers. The treatment duration depends on the relapse rates as well as the patient's response to the treatment.

Many studies on binge eating target the adult population considering that binge eating disorders begin in early or late adulthood. While specific evidences of an adolescent with BED are not available, nevertheless, there are some studies that talk in favor of the efficacy of CBT for binge eating disorders providing significant evidences in the cases of adult population. However, early interventions may be beneficial for the adolescents in terms of targeting exclusively the issues with self-esteem as well as the overvaluation of shape and weight of the body.

Some studies conclude that to bring down the binge eating practices, aiming at weight loss may be advantageous. Weight maintenance, healthy eating as well as exercising to primarily lose weight, may eventually decrease the binge eating behaviors. It is important not to see a treatment for a psychopathological disorders as a weight-loss program, even though weight loss and decrease in binge eating episodes may happen simultaneously.

== Other eating disorders ==
Eating disorders not otherwise specified (NOS) have been given less attention than anorexia nervosa and bulimia nervosa which are given their own categories in the DSM-IV-TR. That said, a recent study has shown that CBT is just as effective for treating eating disorders NOS as it is for bulimia nervosa.
