= Atypical anorexia nervosa =

Eating disorder

Atypical anorexia nervosa (AAN) is an eating disorder in which individuals meet all the qualifications for anorexia nervosa (AN), including a body image disturbance and a history of restrictive eating and weight loss, except that they are not currently underweight (no higher than 85% of a normal bodyweight). Atypical anorexia qualifies as a mental health disorder in the Diagnostic and Statistical Manual of Mental Disorders (DSM-5), under the category Other Specified Feeding and Eating Disorders (OSFED). The characteristics of people with atypical anorexia generally do not differ significantly from anorexia nervosa patients except for their current weight.

Patients with atypical anorexia were diagnosed with the DSM-IV qualification "eating disorder not otherwise specified" (EDNOS) until the DSM-5 was released in 2013. The term atypical anorexia was historically used to describe the restrictive eating habits of some people with autism. The DSM-5 superseded this term with the avoidant/restrictive food intake disorder (ARFID) diagnosis. However, some researchers still critique usage of atypical anorexia for its implication that patients do not fit a standard image of disordered eating. Their concern lies with the term possibly enforcing a limited understanding and categorization of eating disorders.

Other diagnostic manuals, such as the ICD-11 and earlier editions, still group AAN under a label of unspecified disorders rather than its own diagnosis. Researchers point to the lack of official consensus as an issue in treating individuals with AAN.

== Signs and symptoms ==
Many of the physical symptoms of atypical anorexia nervosa are due to the effects of decreased caloric intake which causes the body to significantly suppress the metabolic rate. The body's decreased metabolic rate is a response to stress and causes widespread symptoms that affect many organ systems as the body attempts to adjust to its malnourished state. This causes hypometabolic symptoms such as chronic fatigue, bradycardia, and amenorrhea. Bradycardia and orthostatic instability are frequent and life-threatening complications that account for the majority of medical hospitalizations in atypical anorexia nervosa.

=== Physical symptoms ===
- Amenorrhea
- Rapid, continuous weight loss

Psychiatric and metabolic traits associated with anorexia nervosa

- Bradycardia
- Orthostatic instability
- Chronic fatigue
- Halitosis
- Hypotension
- Slowed gastric emptying
- Insomnia
- Anemia
- Electrolyte imbalance
- Yellowing and/or drying skin

While patients have many similar physical symptoms, there are physical symptoms that may be absent or less frequent in atypical anorexia nervosa as compared to typical anorexia nervosa such as lanugo hair. These symptoms often are attributed to low body weight which is not seen in atypical anorexia nervosa. Other symptoms, such as bradycardia, appear at similar rates in AAN and AN. Patients with AAN are, like patients with AN, at risk of long-term effects of the disorder's physical symptoms such as osteoporosis.

=== Psychiatric/cognitive symptoms ===
- Intense fear of gaining weight or becoming overweight

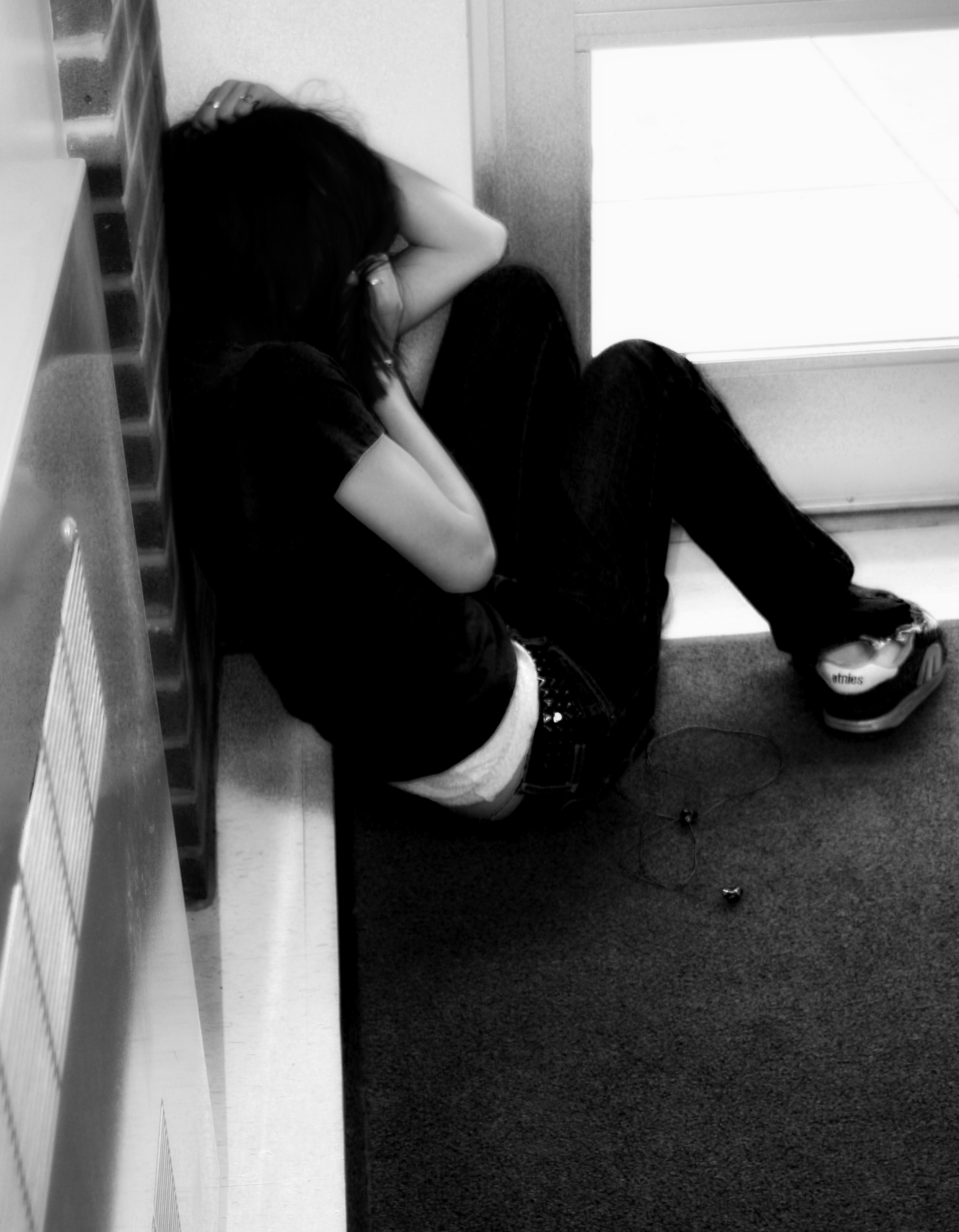
Depression is one of the most common co-morbidities associated with atypical anorexia nervosa.

- Disturbance in the way in which one's body weight or shape is experienced, undue influence of body weight or shape on self-evaluation.
- Obsessive and compulsive symptoms
- Anxiety
- Depression
- Somatization
- Social phobia

It is common for patients with atypical anorexia nervosa to have co-morbid psychiatric disorders such as depression, anxiety, and OCD. Depressive and anxious disorders account for the majority of the comorbid disorders seen in association with atypical anorexia nervosa. However, there are limited studies on the prevalence of psychiatric illness in atypical anorexia nervosa. Researchers posit that patients with AAN may experience increased levels of body dysmorphia and dissatisfaction due to higher body weight.

== Diagnosis ==
The diagnosis of atypical anorexia nervosa is carried out by a licensed health practitioner based on a clinical assessment which includes physical, psychiatric, and behavioral symptoms.

=== DSM-5 criteria ===
The diagnostic criteria used to diagnose psychiatric conditions are found in the Diagnostic and Statistical Manual of Mental Disorders (DSM) published by the American Psychiatric Association. The DSM-5 is the most current revision of the manual which was updated in 2013 to include atypical anorexia nervosa. This update addressed problems raised by the psychiatric community that the eating disorder section of the DSM-4 did not properly address the segment of patients who met many of the criteria of typical anorexia nervosa but did not meet the weight requirement of typical anorexia nervosa. Many of these patients were left without a specific diagnosis while dealing with an eating disorder that did not fit any criteria, leading to the DSM-5's inclusion of disorders that did not meet the criteria but created significant impairment in a patient's daily life. These disorders are found under "Other specified feeding or eating disorders" or OSFED.

According to the DSM-5's "Other specified feeding or eating disorders", atypical anorexia nervosa is defined as "all of the criteria for anorexia nervosa are met, except that despite significant weight loss, the individual's weight is within or above the normal range." There is no consensus in the psychiatric community about what constitutes "significant weight loss", potentially leading to under-diagnosis, and there are calls from the psychiatric community that this be researched and addressed in subsequent DSM publications. Some suggest a transition to a "weight spectrum" rather than a universal weight cutoff, while other suggestions focus more on the non-weight-related symptoms of AN to reach a diagnosis of AAN.

=== Limitations to diagnosis ===
Current diagnostic barriers highlighted by researchers include inconclusive definitions of symptoms, over-emphasis on weight as a symptom, and health providers' biases about patients' appearances. Following DSM-5 conditions of "significant weight loss" correlates with lower reported rates of AAN, though patients with higher weights may still experience symptoms of AN at high degrees. Even within studies which used higher weight cutoffs to define AAN, patients' other symptoms occurred at similar levels of severity. Researchers critique the diagnostic focus on weight cutoffs for its ambiguity and limitations in capturing all patients, such as those whose weight fluctuates due to natural variation. For this reason, some propose a shift toward mental symptoms and other physical effects of malnutrition to diagnose patients.

Alternative diagnostic manuals to the DSM-5 include the ICD-11. However, the ICD-11 also codes AN reliant on an underweight BMI and does not separately code AAN, thus excluding patients who exhibit the same cognitive and behavioral symptoms without the same degree of weight loss. The manual's own unique diagnoses have raised researchers' questions about shifting diagnoses related to the patient's stage of treatment as their weight and other symptoms may improve.

== Treatment ==
The methodologies used by eating disorder treatment centers to treat anorexia nervosa generally also help those affected by atypical anorexia. Re-feeding and addressing any possible electrolyte imbalances is usually the first step in treating atypical anorexia nervosa, as complications from underlying electrolyte imbalances and malnutrition can be fatal. A lower caloric range is recommended when first starting treatment as the patient's body might not be accustomed to a higher caloric range. Treatment in an inpatient facility and with slowly increased calorie intake by 100-200 additional calories per day is recommended to monitor for re-feeding syndrome. Early stages of treatment aim for a moderate rate of weight gain, as a lack of weight gain or rapid weight gain can indicate re-feeding syndrome.

Cognitive behavioral therapy (CBT) may be used to treat patients with AN or AAN, though efficacy is contested.

Treatment may also include a variety of therapies that help a patient deal with depression, anxiety, and other mental symptoms that arise from the eating disorder. In addition to addressing caloric intake and malnutrition, psychological treatment of patients is vital to the treatment of atypical anorexia nervosa. Psychotherapy including cognitive behavioral therapy, dialectical behavioral therapy, and interpersonal therapy are used frequently in the treatment of atypical anorexia nervosa. However, the efficacy of these therapies vary and may only present mild improvement. Studies on treatment outcomes are also currently limited in their measurement criteria, which use primarily BMI increases and EDE scores over other physical, cognitive, and emotional outcomes. Overall, additional study on the efficacy of psychotherapy in treating AAN is necessary at this time.

Psychiatric medications are used as an adjunct to mainstay treatments of atypical anorexia nervosa, as they have limited efficacy as sole treatments of this disease. In anorexia nervosa, patients who are severely malnourished experienced minor improvement with the selective serotonin reuptake inhibitors (SSRIs), and no studies have indicated improvement in atypical anorexia nervosa with SSRIs.

In the US, treatment access may be complicated by the financial reliance on health insurance plans. Medical coding may be incorrect on requests or may be rejected because payers incorrectly evaluated it under the separate criteria for anorexia nervosa.

== Prognosis ==
Anorexia nervosa is one of the most difficult psychiatric disorders to treat and has a high mortality rate due to complications from malnutrition and suicide. Currently there are no specific studies completed on the prognosis of atypical anorexia nervosa. However, the current consensus is that it is similar to, if not worse, than that of anorexia nervosa. One study looked at the length of duration of individual episodes seen in patients and found atypical anorexia nervosa had an 11.2-month duration as compared to anorexia nervosa with an 8-month duration. Other studies support this finding, adding that patients with AAN also lost more weight more rapidly than patients diagnosed with AN, despite not being underweight. Overall, the remission rates of atypical anorexia nervosa and anorexia nervosa are similar at 71% for atypical anorexia nervosa and 75% for anorexia nervosa.

The current consensus is that atypical anorexia patients are at risk for many of the same medical complications of anorexia nervosa. Evidence from a study conducted at the University of California San Francisco Eating Disorders Program suggests that atypical anorexia patients are equally likely as anorexia nervosa patients to develop secondary side effects related to decreased caloric and nutritional intake, including bradycardia, amenorrhea, and electrolyte imbalances.

== Epidemiology ==
Prior to DSM-5, EDNOS made up the majority of eating disorder diagnoses, but it is difficult to determine what proportion of these diagnoses would now be categorized as atypical anorexia. Data on AAN prevalence may also underrepresent cases due to stereotypes about appearances of patients with EDs. Compared to patients with AN, patients diagnosed with AAN may weigh more before developing their disorder. The common assumption that eating disorder patients are thin and White leads providers to overlook assessment for eating disorders and disordered behaviors in non-White and overweight (or obese) teenagers. Weight judgment is prevalent globally among adolescents and adults alike; thus, overweight and obese patients may partake in restrictive eating without notice because of their higher BMI. Weight-related body consciousness may present more in Hispanic and Black women than in their White peers, corresponding also with increased rates of obesity.

Evidence suggests that atypical anorexia is more prevalent than anorexia nervosa, but individuals experiencing it are less likely to receive care. For example, one prospective study of 196 women found a prevalence of 2.8% for atypical anorexia, compared to only 0.8% for anorexia nervosa by the age of 20. However, individuals experiencing atypical anorexia nervosa are less likely to receive care. In addition, when these individuals receive care, there is a higher rate of treatment dropout and decreased treatment response. This can be attributed to several reasons including less stigma surrounding atypical anorexia nervosa due to patients in the normal or overweight range, as well as the perception of patients that the severity of their eating disorder is low because of their weight range.

Meta-analyses across multiple countries found that eating disorder prevalence and symptom severity increased during the COVID-19 pandemic, including anorexia nervosa and its subtypes. Though data are mixed, some statistical analysis found increased hospitalization with a stronger trend in pediatric admissions than that of adults, and additional higher rates of readmission. Disorder symptoms–such as fear of weight gain–and co-morbid mental health disorders appear to have worsened. Researchers attribute the increase to a variety of factors, including feeling isolated from friends or heightened anxiety related to COVID-19. Surveys of patients with anorexia nervosa or atypical anorexia nervosa reported that they wanted to resume treatment in the office, including group sessions, which were limited by social distancing practices during the pandemic. However, data suggest that although inpatient admission for EDs increased, the average stay inpatient decreased and less medical equipment was employed as a treatment method. Overall, researchers agree that further research should be conducted to conclude the impact of COVID-19 on eating disorder behaviors.

Certain demographics are correlated with an increased risk for restrictive eating disorders. Adolescents who identify as LGBTQ+ are more likely to exhibit disordered eating, report body image concerns, and experience mental health issues comorbid with eating disorders than their cisgender or heterosexual peers. Researchers propose that LGBTQ+ teens are at higher risk because of increased social pressures about their appearance related to assumptions of gender. When respondents can select a nonbinary gender option in the study, a higher rate of AAN appears among their gender group. However, there is currently limited information on atypical anorexia nervosa specifically or on eating disorder treatment for LGBTQ+ teens. Likewise, few studies ask respondents about race, thus creating barriers to draw conclusions about disorder rates by racial group. Analysis of CDC data on anorexia nervosa-related deaths found some relationship between region, gender, and age with place of death. Research on these disparities is limited yet to conclude prevalence.
