= Christopher Fairburn =

British psychiatrist and researcher

Christopher G. Fairburn OBE
- Born: 20 September 1950 (age 76)
- Education: Malvern College; University of Oxford (MA, BM, BCh, DM); University of Edinburgh (MPhil)
- Known for: Nature and treatment of eating disorders Transdiagnostic conceptualisation of eating disorders Guided self-help Measures of eating disorder features
- Awards: Wellcome Senior Lecturer 1984, 1987, 1990; Wellcome Principal Research Fellow 1996, 2006; Royal College of Psychiatrists Fellow, 1992; Academy of Medical Sciences Fellow, 2001; Center for Advanced Study in the Behavioral Sciences (Stanford) – Fellow, 1989, 1998; Academy for Eating Disorders - Outstanding Researcher Prize, 2002; Lifetime Achievement Award, 2015; Academy of Cognitive Therapy – Beck Prize 2011
- Scientific career
- Fields: Mental health
- Website: www.psych.ox.ac.uk/team/highwall

Christopher James Alfred Granville Fairburn OBE (born 20 September 1950) is a British psychiatrist and researcher. He is Emeritus Professor of Psychiatry at the University of Oxford. He is known for his research on the development, evaluation and dissemination of psychological treatments, especially for eating disorders.

== Education ==
Fairburn was educated at Malvern College. He trained in medicine at the University of Oxford, and in psychiatry at the University of Edinburgh.

== Career ==
Fairburn has been engaged in full-time clinical research since 1981, initially funded by the Medical Research Council and subsequently by the Wellcome Trust (1984-2017). Between 2007 and 2011, Fairburn was a Governor of the Wellcome Trust, and from 2011 to 2016, he was a founder trustee of MQ: Transforming Mental Health.

Fairburn was appointed Officer of the Order of the British Empire (OBE) in the 2021 Birthday Honours for services to psychological treatments and the treatment of eating disorders.

== Research ==
=== Eating disorders ===
Fairburn's programme of work has led to the development of three treatments for eating disorders. The first is a cognitive behavioural treatment for bulimia nervosa. This was the first psychological treatment to be endorsed by England's National Institute for Health and Care Excellence (NICE). The second is a self-help treatment for people with recurrent binge eating. This is designed to be used either on its own or accompanied by a scalable form of support termed "guided self-help". Guided self-help has been endorsed by NICE as the first step in the treatment of binge eating disorder and bulimia nervosa and is used in the treatment of many other mental disorders. The third treatment is transdiagnostic in its clinical range and is termed "enhanced cognitive behaviour therapy" or CBT-E. In 2015 NHS England and the Chief Medical Officer recommended that this treatment be made available for all patients with an eating disorder, whatever their eating disorder diagnosis and whatever their age, and in 2017 it was endorsed by NICE.

=== Digital technology and the dissemination of psychological treatments ===
Fairburn is working on the conversion of therapist-delivered psychological treatments into scalable digital interventions, either delivered on their own or with remote support. Fairburn has also developed a digital method for training therapists. This is capable of simultaneously training large numbers of geographically dispersed therapists. Fairburn is collaborating with Vikram Patel and colleagues in India who are developing psychological interventions for common mental disorders suitable for delivery by lay counsellors.

=== Measures of eating disorder features ===
Fairburn has developed several measures of eating disorder features and their effects. These include the Eating Disorder Examination (EDE), the Eating Disorder Examination Questionnaire (EDE-Q) and the Clinical Impairment Assessment (CIA). These are in widespread use and are available in multiple languages.
