= Maudsley family therapy =

Form of treatment for anorexia nervosa

- Other names: Maudsley approach

Maudsley family therapy, also known as family-based treatment or Maudsley approach, is a family therapy for the treatment of anorexia nervosa devised by Christopher Dare and colleagues at the Maudsley Hospital in London. A comparison of family to individual therapy was conducted with eighty anorexia patients. The study showed family therapy to be the more effective approach in patients under 18 and within 3 years of the onset of their illness. Subsequent research confirmed the efficacy of family-based treatment for teens with anorexia nervosa. Family-based treatment has been adapted for bulimia nervosa and showed promising results in a randomized controlled trial comparing it to supportive individual therapy.

Maudsley Family Therapy is an evidence-based approach to the treatment of anorexia nervosa and bulimia nervosa whose efficacy has been supported by empirical research.

== Phases of treatment ==
The Maudsley Approach proceeds through three clearly defined phases. The process is divided into 15–20 treatment sessions and takes about 12 months to complete. Daniel Le Grange, PhD and James Lock, MD, PhD describe the treatment as follows:

"The Maudsley approach can mostly be construed as an intensive outpatient treatment where parents play an active and positive role in order to: Help restore their child’s weight to normal levels expected given their adolescent’s age and height; hand the control over eating back to the adolescent, and; encourage normal adolescent development through an in-depth discussion of these crucial developmental issues as they pertain to their child."

More 'traditional' treatment of AN suggests that the clinician's efforts should be individually based. Strict adherents to the perspective of only individual treatment will insist that the participation of parents, whatever the format, is at best unnecessary, but worse still interference in the recovery process. In fact, many proponents of this approach would consider 'family problems' as part of the etiology of the AN. No doubt, this view might contribute to parents feeling themselves to blame for their child's illness. The Maudsley Approach opposes the notion that families are pathological or should be blamed for the development of AN. On the contrary, the Maudsley Approach considers the parents as a resource and essential in successful treatment for AN.

=== Phase I: Weight restoration ===
In Phase I (the "weight restoration phase"), therapy focuses on the consequences of anorexia-associated malnutrition, e.g., changes in growth hormone levels, cardiac dysfunction, and behavioral disturbances. The therapist assesses the family's typical interaction pattern and eating habits and assists the family in re-feeding their child. This may involve reestablishing the patient's relationships with their siblings and peers. Typically, the therapist will attend a family meal during this phase. Conducting a family meal serves at least two functions: (1) it allows the therapist to observe the family's typical interaction patterns around eating, and (2) it provides the therapist with an opportunity to assist the family in encouraging their adolescent to eat a restorative amount of food.

The therapist will spend phase I coaching the parents, supporting the adolescent, and realigning the adolescent with their siblings and peers. Parents are coached to adopt an attitude similar to that of an inpatient nursing team (sometimes termed "home hospital"). That is, parents are to express sympathy and understanding of their adolescent's ambivalence towards the eating disorder, while remaining steadfast in their expectation that the adolescent will work to restore a healthy weight. Realigning the adolescent with their siblings and peers involves helping the adolescent to form stronger and more age-appropriate relationships. This is essential in adolescence, as sibling and peer relationships are more central to the patient than parent–child relationships. Such realigned relationships lessen the possibility of the patient–parent relationship regressing to one defined by age-inappropriate dependency.

Throughout this phase, the therapist must anticipate and prevent parental criticism of the adolescent. In part, this is accomplished by modeling to the parents an uncritical stance toward the adolescent. This is a tenet of the Maudsley Approach: the adolescent is not to blame for their eating disorder behaviors, as these behaviors are symptoms largely outside the adolescent's control.

=== Phase II: Returning control over eating to the adolescent ===
The patient's acceptance of parental demand for increased food intake, steady weight gain, as well as a change in the mood of the family (i.e., relief at having taken charge of the eating disorder), all signal the start of Phase II of treatment.

This phase of treatment focuses on encouraging the parents to help their child to take more control over eating once again. The therapist advises the parents to accept that the main task here is the return of their child to physical health, and that this now happens mostly in a way that is in keeping with their child's age and their parenting style. Although symptoms remain central in the discussions between the therapist and the family, weight gain with minimum tension is encouraged. In addition, all other general family relationship issues or difficulties in terms of day-to-day adolescent or parenting concerns that the family has had to postpone can now be brought forward for review. This, however, occurs only in relationship to the effect these issues have on the parents in their task of assuring steady weight gain. For example, the patient may want to go out with their friends to have dinner and a movie. However, while the parents are still unsure whether their child would eat entirely on their own accord, they might be required to have dinner with their parents and then be allowed to join friends for a movie.

=== Phase III: Establishing healthy adolescent identity ===
Phase III is initiated when the adolescent is able to maintain weight above 95% of ideal weight on their own and self-starvation has abated.

Treatment focus starts to shift to the impact the eating disorder has had on the individual establishing a healthy adolescent identity. This entails a review of central issues of adolescence and includes supporting increased personal autonomy for the adolescent, the development of appropriate parental boundaries, as well as the need for the parents to reorganize their life together after their children's prospective departure."

== Evidence-based strategy ==
To date there have been four randomized controlled trials of Maudsley Family Therapy. The first compared the Maudsley Model to individual therapy and found that family-based treatment was more effective for patients under 19 years of age with less than three years duration of illness. Ninety percent of these patients achieved a normal weight or the return of menses at the end of treatment including at five year follow-up (Eisler, et al., 1997). Two further randomised trials compared standard Maudsley treatment with a modified version where the patients and parents were seen separately (Le Grange et al. 1992). In these trials approximately 70% of patients returned to a normal body weight (>90% IBW) or experienced the return of menses at the end of treatment, regardless of which version of the model was employed. Results from a more recent randomised controlled trial suggest that results are maintained with the manualisation of the Maudsley approach. There is also evidence that a short (six months) and a long course (one year) of treatment results in a similar positive outcome (Lock et al., 2005). Finally, the outcome using family-based treatment appears just as positive for children (9–12 years old) as it does for adolescents.

== Family-Based Treatment Enhanced (FBT+) ==
Family-based treatment enhanced (FBT+) is an adaptation of family-based treatment that combines standard FBT principles with a broader multidisciplinary team, peer workers, and delivery via telehealth. The treatment team in FBT+ always includes a family therapist, a dietitian, a medical provider, a peer mentor with lived experience of an eating disorder who supports the patient, and a peer mentor with lived experience of caring for someone with an eating disorder who supports the parent or carer. In one study, 80% of 210 patients receiving FBT+ achieved 95% of their target weight by 16 weeks of treatment.

== Bibliography ==
- Le Grange, D., & Lock, J. (2005). Help your teenager beat an eating disorder. The Guilford Press
- One Spoonful at a Time by Harriet Brown N.Y. Times Article on the Maudsley approach.
- Le Grange, D (2005). "The Maudsley family-based treatment for adolescent anorexia nervosa". World Psychiatry. 4 (3): 142–6. PMC 1414759. PMID 16633532.
- The Maudsley Model for Children and Adolescents with Anorexia Nervosa: Theory Clinical Practice and Empirical Support. Paul Rhodes ANZJFT; Dec.2003:(4) Article;
- Loeb, KL; Le Grange, D (2009). "Family-Based Treatment for Adolescent Eating Disorders: Current Status, New Applications and Future Directions". International Journal of Child and Adolescent Health. 2 (2): 243–254. PMC 2828763. PMID 20191109.
