= Anorexia =

Eating disorder

Anorexia nervosa
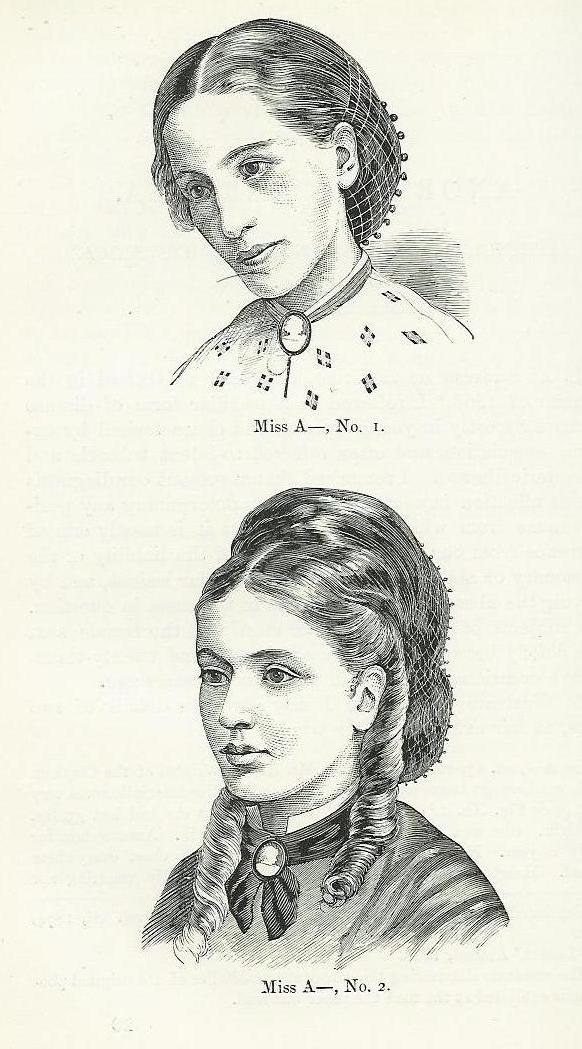
- "Miss A—" depicted in 1866 and in 1870 after treatment. Her condition was one of the earliest case studies of anorexia, published in medical research papers of William Gull.
- Specialty: Psychiatry, clinical psychology, clinical dietetics, internal medicine
- Symptoms: Fear of gaining weight, strong desire to be thin, food restrictions, body image disturbance, loss of appetite
- Complications: Osteoporosis, infertility, heart damage, suicide, whole-body swelling (edema), heart failure or lung failure, gastrointestinal problems, extensive muscle weakness, delirium, death
- Usual onset: Adolescence to early adulthood
- Causes: Unknown
- Risk factors: Family history, high-level athletics, bullying, social media, modeling, substance use disorder, being a dancer or gymnast
- Differential diagnosis: Body dysmorphic disorder, bulimia, hyperthyroidism, inflammatory bowel disease, dysphagia, cancer
- Treatment: Cognitive behavioral therapy, hospitalization to restore weight
- Prognosis: 5% risk of death over 10 years
- Frequency: 2.9 million (2015)
- Deaths: 600 (2015)

Anorexia nervosa (/ænoʊrɛksiənɜːrvoʊsə/ (AN), commonly referred to as anorexia, is an eating disorder characterized by predominant food restriction, body image disturbance, fear of gaining weight, and an overwhelming desire to be thin. These characteristics often mean individuals undergo severe malnutrition as a result of the disorder.

Individuals with anorexia nervosa have a fear of gaining weight, despite the fact that they are typically underweight. The DSM-5 describes this perceptual symptom as "disturbance in the way in which one's body weight or shape is experienced". Recent research has shown that this disturbance is based not on visual body-size overestimation but rather on body dissatisfaction: individuals with anorexia can accurately visually identify their body size, but find severely underweight bodies the most attractive. Individuals with anorexia nervosa may also deny that their symptoms or behaviors are indicative of illness. They may weigh themselves frequently, eat small amounts, and only eat certain foods in order to be in as much control of their body appearance as possible. Some patients with anorexia nervosa binge eat and purge to further influence their weight or shape. Purging can manifest as induced vomiting, excessive exercise, and/or laxative abuse.

Anorexia has one of the highest mortality rates of any psychiatric disorder, second only to opioid overdoses. Medical complications may include osteoporosis, infertility, heart damage, the cessation of menstrual periods (known as amenorrhea), and death. Complications in males may include lowered testosterone. In cases where the patients with anorexia nervosa continually refuse significant dietary intake and weight restoration interventions, a psychiatrist can declare the patient to lack capacity to make decisions, which results in a medical decision to be fed by restraint via nasogastric tube.

Anorexia often develops during adolescence or young adulthood. The causes of anorexia nervosa are complex and vary across individuals, many of which can include genetic, societal, physiological, and environmental causes. Most commonly, the exacerbation of the mental illness is thought to follow a major life-change or stress-inducing events. There is strong evidence, however, that anorexia nervosa also has a genetic component, with identical twins being affected more often than fraternal twins, which sees a large number of genetic risk factors underlying the disorder: similar to other psychiatric disorders with genetic components. Cultural influences also play a significant role, with societies that value thinness having higher rates of the disease. Anorexia nervosa also commonly occurs in athletes who play sports where a low bodyweight is thought to be advantageous for aesthetics or performance, such as dance, cheerleading, gymnastics, running, figure skating, and ski jumping (see also anorexia athletica).

Treatment of anorexia involves restoring the patient back to a healthy weight, treating their underlying psychological problems, and addressing underlying maladaptive behaviors, often with forms of talk therapy; some examples of clinically proven therapies include cognitive behavioral therapy, or Maudsley family therapy, an approach where parents assume responsibility for feeding their child. A daily low dose of olanzapine has been shown to increase appetite and assist with some weight gain in patients. Psychiatrists may also prescribe medications intended to help with anxiety or depression, since these disorders are often comorbid with anorexia. However, medications are not considered a cure for anorexia nervosa: such treatments address the underlying causes for the disorder, which supports recovery by allowing the individual to have a clearer and healthier mental state to understand the complications of anorexia nervosa. It does not assist those who do not have any other related mental conditions that affect their ability to do so. Other eating disorders, such as bulimia and binge eating disorder, also tend to be treated with a combination of psychotherapy and medication.

In severe cases, individuals may need to be fed via a nasogastric tube to restore weight and healthy nutritional levels by force. Evidence for benefit from nasogastric tube feeding is unclear; some individuals recover after the first incident of admission, while others have recurring treatments over many years: sometimes indefinitely. The largest risk of relapse occurs within the first year post-discharge from eating disorder therapy treatment. Within the first two years post-discharge, approximately 31% of anorexia patients relapse. Many complications, both physical and psychological, improve or resolve with nutritional rehabilitation and adequate weight gain.

Anorexia nervosa is estimated to occur in approximately 0.3–4.3% of women and 0.2–1% of men in Western countries at some point in their life. The rate of occurrence in other countries is unclear, due to undiagnosis and a lack of awareness of the disorder, though it is likely the disorder still occurs in countries with a beauty standard that values thinness. There is an observation for an increase in the diagnosis of anorexia from the 20th century onwards; it is unclear whether this is due to an actual increase in its frequency or to improved diagnostic capabilities. In 2013, anorexia directly resulted in about 600 deaths globally, up from 400 deaths in 1990. Eating disorders also increase a person's risk of death from a wide range of other causes, including suicide. About 5% of people with anorexia die from complications over a ten-year period, with medical complications and suicide being the primary and secondary causes of death respectively.

== Signs and symptoms ==
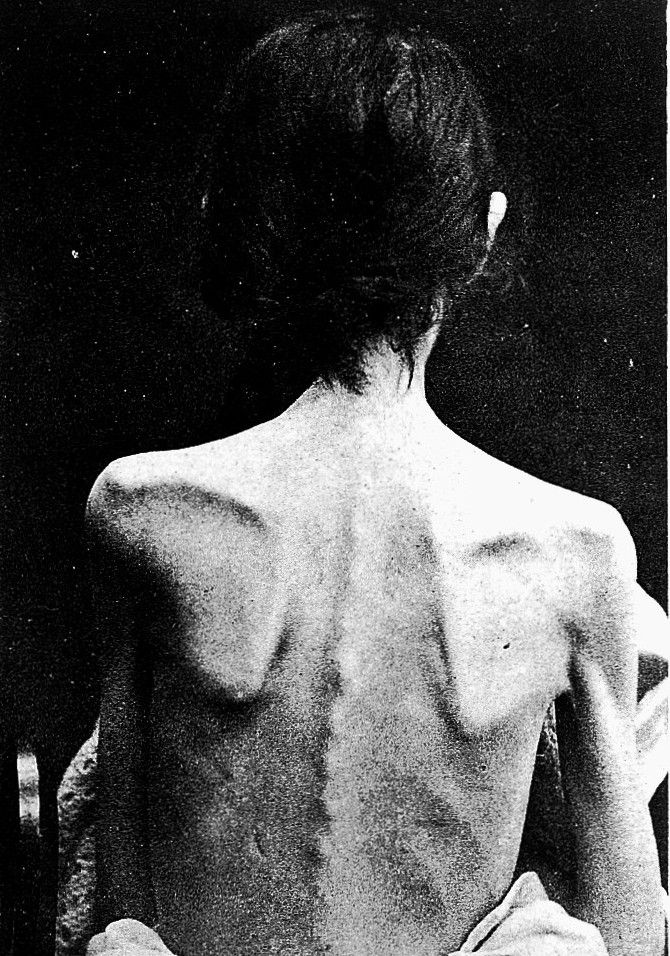
The back of a person with anorexia

Anorexia nervosa is an eating disorder characterized by attempts to lose weight by way of starvation. A person with anorexia may exhibit a number of signs and symptoms, the type and severity of which may vary, or be present without being readily apparent. Although anorexia is often recognized by physical indicators, it is a mental disorder that can occur at any body weight; in cases where body mass index (BMI) remains at a healthy level in adults, but other symptoms are present, the diagnosis may be atypical anorexia nervosa instead.

Anorexia, and the associated malnutrition from self-imposed starvation, causes complications in every major organ system in the body. It can cause permanent changes in the brain due to a lack of essential nutrients in the body. Hypokalemia, a drop in the level of potassium in the blood, is a sign of anorexia: a significant drop in potassium can cause abnormal heart rhythms, constipation, fatigue, muscle damage, and paralysis.

Signs and symptoms may be classified in various categories, including physical, cognitive, affective, behavioral, and perceptual:

=== Physical symptoms ===
- A low BMI for one's age and height (except in cases of atypical anorexia)
- Rapid, continuous weight loss
- Dry hair and skin, hair thinning, as well as hair loss
- Low body temperature (hypothermia)
- Raynaud Phenomenon
- Hypotension or orthostatic hypotension
- Bradycardia or tachycardia
- Chronic fatigue
- Insomnia
- Severe muscle tension, aches and pains
- Absent or irregular menstrual periods in women
- Infertility
- Gastrointestinal disease
- Halitosis (from vomiting or starvation-induced ketosis)
- Abdominal distension
- Russell's Sign; can be a tell-tale sign of self-induced vomiting with scratches on the back of the hand
- Tooth erosion
- Lanugo: soft, fine hair growing over the face and body
- Orange discoloration of the skin, particularly the feet (carotenosis)

=== Cognitive symptoms ===
- An obsession with counting calories and monitoring contents of food
- Preoccupation with food, recipes, or cooking: may cook elaborate dinners for others, but not eat the food themselves, or consume a very small portion in order to distract others from noticing the condition
- Admiration of thinner people
- Thoughts of being fat or not thin enough
- An altered mental representation of one's body
- Impaired theory of mind, exacerbated by lower BMI and depression
- Memory impairment
- Difficulty in abstract thinking and problem solving
- Rigid and inflexible thinking
- Poor self-esteem
- Hypercriticism and perfectionism

=== Affective symptoms ===
- Depression
- Ashamed of oneself or one's body
- Anxiety and anxious disorders
- Rapid mood swings
- Emotional dysregulation
- Alexithymia

=== Behavioral symptoms ===
- Compulsive weighing
- Regular body checking
- Food restriction, both in terms of caloric content and type (for example, macronutrient groups)
- Food rituals, such as cutting food into tiny pieces and measuring it, refusing to eat around others, and hiding or discarding of food
- Purging, which may be achieved through self-induced vomiting, laxatives, diet pills, emetics, diuretics, or exercise
- Excessive exercise or compulsive movement, such as pacing
- Self harming or self-loathing
- Social withdrawal and solitude, resulting from the avoidance of friends, family, and events where food may be present
- Excessive water consumption to create a false impression of satiety
- Excessive caffeine consumption

=== Perceptual symptoms ===
- Unawareness or denial of severity of condition (anosognosia), which may prevent some from seeking recovery
- Perception of self as heavier or fatter than in reality, i.e., body image disturbance
- Altered body schema, i.e., a distorted and unconscious perception of one's body size and shape that influences how the individual experiences their body during physical activities. For example, a patient with anorexia nervosa may genuinely fear that they cannot fit through a narrow passageway. However, due to their malnourished state, their body is significantly smaller than someone who would actually struggle to fit through the same space. In spite of having a small frame, the patient's altered body schema leads them to perceive their body as larger than it is.

=== Interoception ===
Interoception involves the conscious and unconscious sense of the internal state of the body, having an important role in homeostasis and regulation of emotions. Aside from noticeable physiological dysfunction, interoceptive deficits also prompt individuals with anorexia to concentrate on distorted perceptions of multiple elements of their body image. This exists in both people with anorexia and in healthy individuals, due to impairment in interoceptive sensitivity and interoceptive awareness.

Aside from weight loss and external appearance, people with anorexia may also report abnormal bodily functions, such as indistinct feelings of fullness. This is due to miscommunication between internal signals of the body and the brain. Due to impaired interoceptive sensitivity, powerful cues of fullness may be detected prematurely in highly sensitive individuals, which add to decreased calorie consumption and generate anxiety surrounding food intake in anorexia patients. People with anorexia also report difficulty identifying and describing their emotional feelings, and an inability to distinguish emotions from bodily sensations in general (known as alexithymia), likely due to the miscommunication of signals within the body.

Interoceptive awareness and emotion are deeply intertwined. Anorexia patients also exhibit emotional regulation difficulties that ignite emotionally-cued eating behaviors, such as restricting food or excessive exercising. Impaired interoceptive sensitivity and interoceptive awareness can lead anorexia patients to adapt distorted interpretations of weight gain that are cued by physical sensations related to digestion (e.g. fullness). Combined, these interoceptive and emotional elements could together trigger maladaptive and negatively reinforced behavioral responses that contribute to the maintenance of anorexia. In addition to metacognition, people with anorexia also have difficulty with social cognition, including interpreting others' emotions and demonstrating empathy. Abnormal interoceptive awareness and interoceptive sensitivity shown through all of these examples have been observed so frequently in anorexia that they have become key characteristics of the illness.

=== Comorbidity ===
Other psychological issues may factor into anorexia nervosa. Some pre-existing disorders can increase a person's likelihood to develop an eating disorder. Additionally, anorexia can contribute to the development of certain conditions. The presence of psychiatric comorbidity has been shown to affect the severity and type of anorexia symptoms in both adolescents and adults.

Post-traumatic stress disorder (PTSD) remains highly prevalent among patients with anorexia, with comorbid PTSD being associated with more severe eating disorder symptoms. Obsessive–compulsive disorder (OCD) and obsessive–compulsive personality disorder (OCPD) are highly comorbid with anorexia: OCD is linked with more severe symptomatology and worse prognosis. The causality between personality disorders and eating disorders has yet to be fully established. Other comorbid conditions include depression, alcoholism, substance abuse, borderline and other personality disorders, anxiety disorders, attention deficit hyperactivity disorder, and body dysmorphic disorder (BDD). Depression and anxiety are the most common comorbidities, and depression is associated with worse outcomes.

Autism spectrum disorder occurs more commonly among people with eating disorders than in the general population, with about 30% of children and adults with anorexia likely having autism. Zucker et al. (2007) proposed that conditions on the autism spectrum make up the cognitive endophenotype underlying anorexia and appealed for increased interdisciplinary collaboration.

== Causes ==
There is evidence for biological, psychological, developmental, and sociocultural risk factors, but the exact cause of eating disorders is unknown.

=== Genetic ===
Genetic correlations of anorexia with psychiatric and metabolic traits

Anorexia nervosa is highly heritable. Twin studies have shown a heritability rate of 28–58%. First-degree relatives of those with anorexia have roughly 12 times the risk of developing anorexia. Association studies have been performed, studying 128 different polymorphisms related to 43 genes, including genes involved in regulation of eating behavior, motivation and reward mechanics, personality traits and emotion. Consistent associations have been identified for polymorphisms associated with agouti-related peptide, brain derived neurotrophic factor, catechol-o-methyl transferase, SK3, and opioid receptor delta-1. Epigenetic modifications, such as DNA methylation, may contribute to the development or maintenance of anorexia, though clinical research in this area is in its infancy.

A 2019 study found a genetic relationship with mental disorders, such as schizophrenia, OCD, anxiety disorder, and depression, and metabolic functioning with a negative correlation with fat mass, type 2 diabetes, and leptin.

=== Environmental ===
Both prenatal and perinatal obstetric complications may factor into the development of anorexia nervosa, such as preterm birth, maternal anemia, diabetes mellitus, preeclampsia, placental infarction, and neonatal heart abnormalities. Neonatal complications may also have an influence on harm avoidance, one of the personality traits associated with the development of anorexia.

Neuroendocrine dysregulation—the altered signaling of peptides that facilitate communication between the gut, brain and adipose tissue, such as ghrelin, leptin, neuropeptide Y and orexin—may contribute to the pathogenesis of anorexia nervosa by disrupting regulation of hunger and satiety.

People with gastrointestinal diseases may be more at risk of developing disorders of eating practices than the general population, principally with restrictive eating disturbances. An association of anorexia with celiac disease has been found. Individuals with good dietary management may develop anxiety, food aversion, and eating disorders because of concerns around cross contamination of their foods. Some authors suggest that medical professionals should evaluate the presence of unrecognized celiac disease in all people with an eating disorder, especially if they present any gastrointestinal symptoms (such as decreased appetite, abdominal pain, bloating, distension, vomiting, diarrhea or constipation), weight loss, or growth failure. It is also recommended to routinely ask celiac patients about weight or body shape concerns, and dieting or vomiting for weight control to evaluate the possible presence of an eating disorder, especially in women.

Anorexia is more likely to occur in a person's pubertal years. Some explanatory hypotheses for the rising prevalence of eating disorders in adolescence are "increase of adipose tissue in girls, hormonal changes of puberty, societal expectations of increased independence and autonomy that are particularly difficult for anorexic adolescents to meet; [and] increased influence of the peer group and its values."

==== Anorexia as adaptation ====
Studies have hypothesized that disordered eating patterns may also arise secondary to starvation. The results of the Minnesota Starvation Experiment, for example, showed that normal controls will exhibit many of the same behavioral patterns associated with anorexia when subjected to starvation. Similarly, scientific experiments conducted using mice have suggested that other mammals exhibit these same behaviors, especially compulsive movement, when caloric restriction is induced, likely mediated by various changes in the neuroendocrine system. This has given further rise to the hypothesis that anorexia and other restrictive eating disorders may be an evolutionarily advantageous adaptive response to a perceived famine in the environment. Recent research has further expanded this perspective, showing how caloric restriction may be adaptive in volatile or uncertain environments: thus potentially explaining the association between adverse childhood experiences and an increased risk of developing anorexia.

=== Psychological ===
Early theories of the cause of anorexia linked it to childhood sexual abuse or dysfunctional families; evidence is conflicting, and well-designed research is needed. The fear of food is known as sitiophobia or cibophobia, and is part of the differential diagnosis. Other psychological causes of anorexia include low self-esteem, feeling a lack of control, depression, anxiety, and loneliness. People with anorexia are, in general, highly perfectionistic and most have obsessive–compulsive personality traits, which may facilitate sticking to a restricted diet. It has been suggested that patients with anorexia are rigid in their thought patterns and place a high level of importance upon being thin. In the context of anorexia, this cognitive rigidity refers to the diminished ability to adapt one's behavioral approaches in response to changing circumstances. This weaker cognitive flexibility is a result of neurobiological factors, such as structural differences in prefrontal cortex connectivity, that contribute to the persistence of anorexic behaviors.

Although the prevalence rates vary greatly, between 37% and 100%, there appears to be an association between traumatic events and eating disorder diagnosis. Approximately 72% of individuals with anorexia report experiencing a traumatic event prior to the onset of eating disorder symptoms, with the binge-purge subtype of the disorder reporting the highest rates. There are many traumatic events that have been identified as possible risk factors for the development of anorexia, the first of which was childhood sexual abuse.

The prevalence of post-traumatic stress disorder (PTSD) among anorexia patients ranges from 4% to 24%. A complicated symptom profile develops when trauma and anorexia are comorbid; the bodily experience of the individual is changed, and intrusive thoughts and sensations may be experienced. Traumatic events can lead to intrusive and obsessive thoughts, and the symptom of anorexia that has been most closely linked to a PTSD diagnosis is increased obsessive thoughts pertaining to food. Similarly, impulsivity is linked to the purge and binge-purge subtypes of anorexia, trauma, and PTSD. Emotional trauma (e.g., invalidation, chaotic family environment in childhood) may lead to difficulty with emotions, particularly identifying emotions and how physical sensations contribute to the emotional response.

When trauma is perpetrated on an individual, it can lead to feelings of not being safe within their own body: both physical and sexual abuse can lead to an individual seeing their body as belonging to an "other" and not to the "self". Individuals who feel as though they have no control over their bodies due to trauma may use food as a means of control, because the choice of when and how much to eat is an expression of control. Individuals, particularly children experiencing abuse, may feel a loss of control over their life, circumstances, and their own bodies. Particularly sexual abuse, but also physical abuse, can make individuals feel that their body is not a safe place, but rather an object over which another has control. Starvation, in the case of anorexia, may also lead to reduction in the body as a sexual object, making starvation a solution. Food restriction may also be the means by which an individual is trying to communicate the pain they are experiencing.

=== Sociological ===
Anorexia nervosa has been increasingly diagnosed since 1950; the increase has been linked to vulnerability and internalization of body ideals. People in professions where there is a particular social pressure to be thin (such as models and dancers) were more likely to develop anorexia, and those with anorexia have much higher contact with cultural sources that promote weight loss. Internet usage tends to increase exposure to societal practices of the upkeep of slender body types, thus leading many to have symptoms of body dissatisfaction and low body image satisfaction. This trend can also be observed for people who partake in certain sports, such as jockeys and wrestlers. There is a higher incidence and prevalence of anorexia in sports with an emphasis on aesthetics, sports where low body fat is advantageous, and sports in which one has to meet a certain weight for competition. Family and group dynamics can play a role in the perpetuation of anorexia, such as within negative emotional dynamics or overprotective families where blame is frequently experienced among its members. In the face of constant pressure to be thin, often perpetuated by teasing and bullying, feelings of low self-esteem and self-worth can arise, including the perception that one is not "deserving" of food.

=== Media effects ===
Persistent exposure to media that presents thin ideals may constitute a risk factor for body dysmorphia, leading to the development of anorexia. Western cultures that favor thin bodies as the beauty standard often have higher rates of anorexia. Media sources such as magazines, television shows, and social media can contribute to body dissatisfaction and disordered eating globally, by emphasizing slimness prevalent in Western ideals. Among magazines popular with people aged 18 to 24, those with a predominantly male audience were more likely to feature advertisements and articles focused on body shape in relation to body culture, rather than promoting a healthy diet. In addition to the direct effect of media on female body perception, media indirectly affects female body image by giving men a false perception of what a female body is meant to look like. Body dissatisfaction and internalization of body ideals are risk factors for anorexia that threaten the health of both male and female populations, with a predominant negative impact on girls and women.

Another aspect of media contributing to higher rates of eating disorders such as anorexia are websites and communities on social media that stress the importance of attaining the "ideal" body. These communities promote anorexia through the use of religious metaphors, lifestyle demonstrations, and photo galleries or quotes meant to motivate the individual's pursuit of thinness (commonly referred to as "thinspiration", "bone-spiration", and "fitspiration"). These pro-anorexia websites perpetuate the internalization of body ideals and the pressure to attain them.

=== Cultural ===
Cultural attitudes towards body image, beauty, and health also impact the incidence of anorexia nervosa. There is a contrast between Western societies that idolize slimness and certain Eastern traditions that worship gods depicted with larger bodies, and these cultural norms have varying influences on eating behaviors, self-perception, and anorexia in their respective cultures. For example, "fatphobia" (fear of being fat or gaining weight) is a key diagnostic criteria of anorexia in the DSM-5, but studies have not consistently found this aspect of the disorder among anorexic patients in Eastern countries. Thus, fatphobia can be linked to Western cultures, demonstrating how differing cultural perceptions can impact the symptoms and presentation of anorexia in various ways. Collectivist and individualistic values also play a role in the manifestation of symptoms; for example, anorexic patients in China are more likely to display denial or minimization of symptoms, since they are culturally encouraged to preserve group harmony.

There is a need for more research with diverse cultural considerations when looking at the diagnosis and experience of anorexia, since "there are multiple ways in which eating disorders are culturally-reactive but not necessarily culture-bound". For example, in a cross-sectional study on British South Asian and English adolescent anorexia patients, it was found that the patients' symptom profiles differed: South Asians were less likely to exhibit fatphobia as a symptom compared to their English counterparts, instead exhibiting loss of appetite. However, most anorexia patients still presented with distorted body images, implying the possibility of disordered eating and highlighting the need for cultural sensitivity when diagnosing anorexia. Similarly, patients in Hong Kong usually attributed their restricted food intake to somatic symptoms, such as bloating, stomach pain, or lack of appetite, rather than fear of weight gain; however, the occurrence of "fatphobic anorexia" has steadily increased, while "non-fatphobic anxoreia" has decreased.

These cultural differences are also apparent in research on the Caribbean island of Curaçao, which revealed a substantially lower incidence of anorexia overall than that observed in the United States and Western Europe. Specifically, no cases of anorexia were identified among the majority Black population, while the minority multiracial and white populations showed incidence rates similar to those in Western countries. This disparity highlights potential cultural variations in the development of anorexia, particularly when comparing the experiences of Black women in Curaçao to those with higher exposure to Western cultural influences.

Notably, although these cultural distinctions persist, modernization and globalization have been shown to slowly homogenize these attitudes. Anorexia is increasingly tied to the pressures of a global culture that centers Western beauty ideals of thinness; the spread of Western media, fashion, and lifestyle ideals across the globe has begun to shift perceptions and standards of beauty in diverse cultures, contributing to a rise in the incidence of anorexia in places they were once rare. Anorexia, once primarily associated with Western culture, seems more than ever to be linked to the influences of modernity and globalization.

However, unique cultural-specific phenotypes of disordered eating were noted prior to Western influence. For example, restrictive eating patterns were found in Japan as early as the 18th century, and subsequently fewer reports of eating disorders were found between 1868 and 1944, when rapid Westernization occurred. Sex-specific stressors and cultural dynamics could be implicated in this independent development of anorexia nervosa symptomology.

== Mechanisms ==
Evidence from physiological, pharmacological, and neuroimaging studies suggest serotonin (also called 5-HT) may play a role in anorexia. While acutely ill, metabolic changes may produce a number of biological findings in people with anorexia that are not necessarily causative of the anorexic behavior. For example, abnormal hormonal responses to challenges with serotonergic agents have been observed during acute illness, but not recovery. Nevertheless, increased cerebrospinal fluid concentrations of 5-hydroxyindoleacetic acid (a metabolite of serotonin) and changes in anorectic behavior in response to acute tryptophan depletion (tryptophan is a metabolic precursor to serotonin) support their role in anorexia. The activity of the 5-HT_{2A} receptors has been reported to be lower in patients with anorexia in a number of cortical regions, evidenced by lower binding potential of this receptor as measured by PET or SPECT, independent of the state of illness. While these findings may be confounded by comorbid psychiatric disorders, taken as a whole, they indicate the role of serotonin in anorexia. These alterations in serotonin have been linked to traits characteristic of anorexia such as obsessiveness, anxiety, and appetite dysregulation.

Neuroimaging studies investigating the functional connectivity between brain regions have observed a number of alterations in networks related to cognitive control, introspection, and sensory function. Alterations in networks related to the dorsal anterior cingulate cortex may be related to excessive cognitive control of eating-related behaviors. Similarly, altered somatosensory integration and introspection may relate to abnormal body image. A review of functional neuroimaging studies reported reduced activation in the "bottom up" limbic region and increased activation in the "top down" cortical regions, which may play a role in restrictive eating.

Compared to controls, people who have recovered from anorexia show reduced activation in the reward system in response to food, and reduced correlation between self-reported liking of a sugary drink and activity in the striatum and anterior cingulate cortex. Increased binding potential of ^{11}C radiolabelled raclopride in the striatum, interpreted as reflecting decreased endogenous dopamine due to competitive displacement, has also been observed.

Structural neuroimaging studies have found global reductions in both gray matter and white matter, as well as increased cerebrospinal fluid volumes. Regional decreases in the left hypothalamus, left inferior parietal lobe, right lentiform nucleus, and right caudate have also been reported in acutely ill patients. However, these alterations seem to be associated with acute malnutrition and are largely reversible with weight restoration, at least in nonchronic cases in younger people. In contrast, some studies have reported increased orbitofrontal cortex volume in currently ill and recovered patients, although findings are inconsistent. Reduced white matter integrity in the fornix has also been reported.

== Diagnosis ==
A diagnostic assessment includes the person's current circumstances, biographical history, current symptoms, and family history. The assessment also includes a mental state examination, which is an assessment of the person's current mood and thought content, focusing on views on weight and patterns of eating.

=== DSM-5 ===
Anorexia nervosa is classified under the Feeding and Eating Disorders in the fifth revision of the Diagnostic and Statistical Manual of Mental Disorders (DSM-5). There is no specific BMI cut-off that defines low weight required for the diagnosis of anorexia.

The diagnostic criteria for anorexia nervosa (all of which need to be met for diagnosis) are:

- Restriction of energy intake relative to requirements leading to a low body weight. (Criterion A)
- Intense fear of gaining weight or persistent behaviors that interfere with gaining weight. (Criterion B)
- Disturbance in the way a person's weight or body shape is experienced, or a lack of recognition about the risks of the low body weight. (Criterion C)

Relative to the previous version of the DSM (DSM-IV-TR), the 2013 revision (DSM-5) reflects changes in the criteria for anorexia nervosa. Most notably, the amenorrhea (absent menstration) criterion was removed. Amenorrhea was removed for several reasons: it does not apply to males; it is not applicable for females before the age of menstruation, during or after the menopause; or for women of any age taking birth control. Additionally, some women who meet the other criteria for anorexia still report some menstrual activity.

==== Subtypes ====
There are two subtypes of anorexia nervosa:

- Restrictive Type: the patient has not engaged in binging and purging via laxative or diuretic abuse, enemas, or self-induced vomiting – weight loss is mainly achieved through fasting, dieting, and excessive exercise.
- Binge-eating / Purging Type: the patient has engaged in binge-purge cycles in the past few months.

==== Levels of severity ====
The use of the body mass index in the diagnosis of eating disorders has been controversial, largely owing to its oversimplification of health and failure to account for complicating factors, such as body composition or the initial body weight of the patient prior to the onset of anorexia. As such, the DSM-5 does not have a strict BMI cutoff for the diagnosis of anorexia, but it nevertheless uses BMI to establish levels of severity, which it states as follows:

- Mild: BMI of greater than 17
- Moderate: BMI of 16–16.99
- Severe: BMI of 15–15.99
- Extreme: BMI of less than 15

=== ICD-11 ===
Anorexia nervosa is classified under feeding or eating disorders in both the ICD-11 and the DSM-5. Like the DSM-5, the ICD-11 also distinguishes between a binge-purge pattern and a restricting pattern, with further subcodes.

=== Proposed diagnoses ===
Terminal anorexia nervosa (TAN) is a proposed psychiatric diagnosis and is not currently clinically recognized. It may be used to facilitate access to medical assistance in dying (MAID). Patients may be considered for TAN if they are at least 30 years old, have previously and persistently received "high-quality multidisciplinary eating disorder care", and have clearly and consistently expressed that additional treatment would be futile.

=== Investigations ===
Medical tests to check for signs of physical deterioration in anorexia nervosa may be performed by a general physician or psychiatrist.

==== Physical examination ====
- Blinded weight: The patient will strip and put on a surgical gown alone. The patient will step backwards onto the scale as the healthcare provider blocks the reading from the patient's line of vision.
- Orthostatic vitals: The patient lies completely flat for five minutes, and then, the medical provider measures the patient's blood pressure and heart rate. The patient stands up and stays stationary for two minutes. Then, the blood pressure and heart rate are assessed again, making note of any patient symptoms upon standing like dizziness. According to the College of Family Physicians of Canada, a change in orthostatic heart rate greater than 20 beats/minute or a change in orthostatic blood pressure greater than 10mmHg can warrant admission for an adolescent.
- Examination of hands and arms for brittle nails, Russell's sign, swollen joints, lanugo, and self harm.
- Auscultation of the chest for rubs, gallops, thrills, murmurs, and apex beat.
- Examination of the face for puffiness, dental decay, swollen parotid glands, and conjunctival hemorrhage.

==== Blood tests ====
- Complete blood count (CBC): a test of the white blood cells, red blood cells and platelets used to assess the presence of various disorders such as leukocytosis, leukopenia, thrombocytosis and anemia which may result from malnutrition.
- Chem-20: Chem-20, also known as SMA-20, is a group of twenty separate chemical tests performed on blood serum. Tests include protein and electrolytes such as potassium, chlorine and sodium, and tests specific to liver and kidney function.
- Glucose tolerance test: Oral glucose tolerance test (OGTT) used to assess the body's ability to metabolize glucose. Can be useful in detecting various disorders such as diabetes, an insulinoma, Cushing's Syndrome, hypoglycemia and polyendocrine metabolic ovarian syndrome (PMOS).
- Lipid profile: includes cholesterol (including total cholesterol, HDL and LDL) and triglycerides.
- Serum cholinesterase test: a test of liver enzymes (acetylcholinesterase and pseudocholinesterase) useful as a test of liver function and to assess the effects of malnutrition.
- Liver function tests: A series of tests used to assess liver function some of the tests are also used in the assessment of malnutrition, protein deficiency, kidney function, bleeding disorders, and Crohn's Disease.
- Luteinizing hormone (LH) response to gonadotropin-releasing hormone (GnRH): Tests the pituitary glands' response to GnRh, a hormone produced in the hypothalamus. Hypogonadism is often seen in anorexia nervosa cases.
- Creatine kinase (CK) test: measures the circulating blood levels of creatine kinase an enzyme found in the heart (CK-MB), brain (CK-BB) and skeletal muscle (CK-MM).
- Blood urea nitrogen (BUN) test: urea nitrogen is the byproduct of protein metabolism first formed in the liver then removed from the body by the kidneys. The BUN test is primarily used to test kidney function. A low BUN level may indicate the effects of malnutrition.
- BUN-to-creatinine ratio: A BUN to creatinine ratio is used to predict various conditions. A high BUN/creatinine ratio can occur in severe hydration, acute kidney failure, congestive heart failure, and intestinal bleeding. A low BUN/creatinine ratio can indicate a low protein diet, celiac disease, rhabdomyolysis, or cirrhosis of the liver.
- Thyroid function tests: tests used to assess thyroid functioning by checking levels of thyroid-stimulating hormone (TSH), thyroxine (T4), and triiodothyronine (T3).

==== Additional medical screenings ====
- Urinalysis: a variety of tests performed on the urine used in the diagnosis of medical disorders, to test for substance abuse, and as an indicator of overall health
- Electrocardiogram (EKG or ECG): measures electrical activity of the heart. It can be used to detect various disorders such as hyperkalemia.
- Electroencephalogram (EEG): measures the electrical activity of the brain. It can be used to detect abnormalities such as those associated with pituitary tumors.

=== Differential diagnoses ===
A variety of medical and psychological conditions have been misdiagnosed as anorexia nervosa; in some cases the correct diagnosis was not made for more than ten years.

The distinction between binge-purge anorexia, bulimia nervosa and Other Specified Feeding or Eating Disorders (OSFED) is often difficult for non-specialist clinicians. A main factor differentiating binge-purge anorexia from bulimia is the gap in physical weight. Patients with bulimia nervosa are ordinarily at a healthy weight, or slightly overweight. Patients with binge-purge anorexia are commonly underweight. Moreover, patients with the binge-purging subtype may be significantly underweight and typically do not binge-eat large amounts of food. In contrast, those with bulimia nervosa tend to binge-eat large amounts of food. It is not unusual for patients with an eating disorder to "move through" various diagnoses as their behavior and mental state changes over time.

== Treatment ==
Treatment for people with anorexia nervosa should be individualized and tailored to each person's medical, psychological, and nutritional circumstances. Treating this condition with an interdisciplinary team is suggested, so that the different health care professional specialties can help address the different challenges that can be associated with recovery. Treatment for anorexia typically involves a combination of medical, psychological (therapy), and nutritional interventions (diet). The person requires a comprehensive medical assessment to help direct the treatment options, and hospitalization may be needed in some cases. There is no conclusive evidence that any particular treatment approach for anorexia works better than others. In some clinical settings, a specific body image intervention is performed to reduce body dissatisfaction and body image disturbance. Although restoring the person's weight is the primary task at hand, optimal treatment includes and monitors behavioral change in the individual as well.

In general, treatment for anorexia nervosa aims to address three main areas:

- Restoring the person to a healthy weight;
- Treating the psychological disorders related to the illness;
- Reducing or eliminating behaviors or thoughts that originally led to the disordered eating.

=== Psychological support ===
Psychological support, often in the form of cognitive behavioral therapy (CBT), family-based treatment, or psychotherapy aims to change distorted thoughts and behaviors around food, body image, and self-worth, with family-based therapy also being a key approach for younger patients.

==== Family-based therapy ====
Family-based treatment (FBT) may be more successful than individual therapy for adolescents with anorexia nervosa. Various forms of family-based treatment have been proven to work in the treatment of adolescent anorexia including conjoint family therapy (CFT), in which the parents and child are seen together by the same therapist, and separated family therapy (SFT), in which the parents and child attend therapy separately with different therapists. Proponents of family therapy for adolescents with AN assert that it is important to include parents in the adolescent's treatment. Despite the evidence that family-based therapy is effective and the primary choice for treatment in adolescents, the evidence supporting family based therapy for adults is weak.

A four- to five-year follow up study of the Maudsley family therapy, an evidence-based manualized model, showed full recovery at rates up to 90%. The Maudsley model of family therapy is problem focused, and the treatment targets re-establishing regular eating, weight restoration, and the reduction of illness behaviors like purging. The Maudsley model is split into three phases: phase one focuses on the parents implementing weight restoration in the child; phase two transitions control over food back to the individual at an age-appropriate level; and phase three focuses on other issues related to typical adolescent development (e.g., social and other psychological developments) and helps parents learn how to interact with their child. Although this model is recommended by the National Institute of Mental Health (NIMH), critics claim that it has the potential to create power struggles in an intimate relationship and may disrupt equal partnerships.

==== Cognitive behavioral therapy ====
Cognitive behavioral therapy (CBT) is useful in adolescents and adults with anorexia nervosa. One of the most known psychotherapies in the field is CBT-E, an enhanced cognitive-behavior therapy specifically focused on eating disorder psychopathology. Acceptance and commitment therapy is a third-wave cognitive behavioral therapy which has shown promise in the treatment of AN. Cognitive remediation therapy (CRT) is also used in treating anorexia. Schema-Focused Therapy (a form of CBT) was developed by Dr. Jeffrey Young and is effective in helping patients identify origins and triggers for disordered eating.

==== Psychotherapy ====
Psychotherapy for individuals with anorexia is challenging, as they may value being thin, and may seek to maintain control and resist change and recovery. Initially, developing a desire to change is fundamental. There is no strong evidence to suggest one type of psychotherapy over another for treating anorexia in adults or adolescents.

=== Diet ===
Diet is the most essential factor to work on in people with anorexia nervosa and must be tailored to each person's needs. Food variety is important when establishing meal plans as well as foods that are higher in energy density, especially in carbohydrates and dietary fat, which are easier for the undernourished body to break down. Evidence of a role for zinc supplementation during refeeding is unclear. Dieticians work with the medical team to add dietary supplements like iron, every other day, or calcium.

Historically, practitioners have slowly increased calories at a measured pace from a starting point of around 1,200 kcal/day. However, as understanding of the process of weight restoration has improved, an approach that favors a higher starting point and a more rapid rate of increase has become increasingly common. In either approach, the end goal is typically in the range of 3,000 to 3,500 kcal/day.

==== Extreme hunger ====
After experiencing prolonged significant calorie deficits, people often undergo extreme hunger (hyperphagia). Once weight is regained in both fat and muscle mass, their hunger usually returns to normalized levels. This process of regaining weight takes longer for fat-free/muscle mass which leads to a "fat overshoot" or "overshoot weight". This causes patient's body fat levels to be greater than before the disorder. This kind of process for hunger normalization varies between patients and could last anywhere from a few months to multiple years.

==== Refeeding syndrome ====
When a malnourished person is refed too quickly, they may develop refeeding syndrome (RFS), which can be life-threatening. Factors associated with increased risk for RFS include:

- Very low bodyweight;
- Rapid weight loss, regardless of starting bodyweight;
- Medical comorbidities, such as infection or malabsorption;
- Excessive purging behaviours, including self-induced vomiting, laxative abuse, and diuretic abuse.

Two of the most common indicators that RFS is occurring are low phosphate levels and low potassium levels.

In these circumstances, it is recommended to start refeeding more slowly but to build up rapidly, as long as RFS does not occur. Recommendations on energy requirements in the most medically compromised patients vary, from 5–10 kcal/kg/day to 1900 kcal/day. Treatment professionals must balance the risk of RFS with the risk of underfeeding, which can result in poor health outcomes for short- and long-term recovery.

=== Medication ===
Overall, pharmaceuticals have limited benefit for treating anorexia nervosa. However, olanzapine, an antipsychotic, has been shown to result in a modest but statistically significant increase in body weight in AN patients, in addition to a decrease in obsessive thoughts. While the effectiveness of antidepressants in treating anorexia has not been well established, fluoxetine, an SSRI, may also be used during treatment.

Metreleptin is undergoing research for its potential benefit in the treatment of anorexia nervosa. It is hypothesized that the gradual loss of body fat mass and the ensuing low leptin levels influence the psychological components of the disorder. It was shown that short-term metreleptin treatment of patients with anorexia nervosa resulted in a rapid on-set of beneficial cognitive, emotional, and behavioral effects. Among other things, depression, drive for activity, repetitive thoughts of food, inner restlessness, and weight phobia decreased rapidly. Whether metreleptin (or another leptin analogue) is a suitable treatment for anorexia remains to be seen.

=== Hospital admission ===
Patients with anorexia nervosa may be deemed to have a lack of insight regarding the necessity of treatment, and thus may be involuntarily committed to an inpatient facility, such as a hospital, and receive involuntary treatment without their consent. AN has a high mortality rate, and patients admitted to medical units in a severely ill state are at a particularly high risk. Diagnosis can be challenging, risk assessment may not be performed accurately, consent and the need for compulsion may not be assessed appropriately, refeeding syndrome may be missed or poorly treated, and the behavioural and family problems in AN may be missed or poorly managed. Guidelines published by the Royal College of Psychiatrists recommend that medical and psychiatric experts work together in managing severely ill people with AN.

=== Experience of treatment ===
Patients involved in treatment sometimes felt that the treatment focused on biological aspects of body weight and eating behavior change, rather than their perceptions or emotional state. Patients felt that a therapist's trust in them, shown by being treated as a complete person with their own capacities, was significant. Some patients defined recovery from AN in terms of reclaiming a lost identity. Additionally, access to timely treatment can be hindered by systemic challenges within the medical system. Some individuals have reported experiencing delays in treatment, particularly when transitioning from adolescence to adulthood.

Healthcare workers involved in the treatment of anorexia reported frustration and anger with setbacks in treatment and noncompliance, and were afraid of patients dying. Some healthcare workers felt that they did not understand the treatment and that medical doctors were making decisions. They may feel powerless to improve a patient's situation and feel deskilled as a result. Healthcare workers involved in monitoring patients' consumption of food reported feeling watched themselves. Healthcare workers often feel a degree of moral dissonance of not being in control of outcomes, which they may protect against by focusing on individual tasks, avoiding identifying with patients (for example by making their eating behavior very different and not sharing personal information with patients), and blaming patients for their distress. Healthcare workers would inflexibly follow process to avoid responsibility. Healthcare workers attempted to reach balance by gradually giving patients back control, avoiding feeling sole responsibility for outcomes, being mindful of their emotional state, and trying to view eating disorders as external from patients.

== Prognosis ==
Deaths due to eating disorders per million persons in 2012 0–1 1–2 2–3 3–4 4–25

Anorexia nervosa has the highest mortality rate of any psychological disorder. The mortality rate is 11 to 12 times greater than in the general population, and the suicide risk is 56 times higher. Half of women with AN achieve a full recovery, while an additional 20–30% may partially recover. Not all people with anorexia recover completely: about 20% develop anorexia as a chronic disorder. If anorexia is not treated, serious complications such as heart conditions and kidney failure can arise and eventually lead to death. The average number of years from onset to remission of AN is seven for women and three for men. After ten to fifteen years, 70% of people no longer meet the diagnostic criteria, but many still continue to have eating-related issues. People who have autism recover more slowly, probably due to autism's effects on thinking patterns, such as reduced cognitive flexibility.

Alexithymia (inability to identify and describe one's own emotions) influences treatment outcomes. Recovery is also viewed as a spectrum, rather than in absolute terms. According to the Morgan-Russell criteria, individuals can have a good, intermediate, or poor outcome. Even when a person is classified as having a "good" outcome, weight only has to be within 15% of average, and normal menstruation must be present in females. The good outcome also excludes psychological health. Recovery for people with anorexia is undeniably positive, but recovery does not mean a return to normal.

=== Complications ===
Anorexia nervosa can have serious implications if its duration and severity are significant, and if onset occurs before the completion of growth, pubertal maturation, or the attainment of peak bone mass. Complications specific to adolescents and children with anorexia can include growth retardation, as height gain may slow and can stop completely with severe weight loss or chronic malnutrition. In such cases, provided that growth potential is preserved, height increase can resume and reach full potential after normal intake is resumed. Height potential is normally preserved if the duration and severity of illness are not significant or if the illness is accompanied by delayed bone age (especially prior to a bone age of approximately 15 years), as hypogonadism may partially counteract the effects of undernutrition on height by allowing for a longer duration of growth compared to controls. Appropriate early treatment can preserve height potential, and may even help to increase it in some post-anorexic subjects, due to factors such as long-term reduced estrogen-producing adipose tissue levels compared to premorbid levels. In some cases, especially where onset is before puberty, complications such as stunted growth and pubertal delay are usually reversible.

Anorexia causes alterations in the female reproductive system; significant weight loss, as well as psychological stress and intense exercise, typically results in a cessation of menstruation in women who are past puberty. In patients with anorexia, there is a reduction of the secretion of gonadotropin-releasing hormone in the central nervous system, which prevents ovulation. Anorexia can also result in pubertal delay or arrest. Both height gain and pubertal development are dependent on the release of growth hormone (GH) and gonadotropins (LH and FSH) from the pituitary gland. Suppression of gonadotropins in people with anorexia has been documented. Typically, GH levels are high, but levels of IGF-1, the downstream hormone that should be released in response to GH, are low: this indicates a state of "resistance" to GH due to chronic starvation. IGF-1 is necessary for bone formation, and decreased levels in anorexia contribute to a loss of bone density and potentially contribute to osteopenia or osteoporosis. Anorexia can also result in reduction of peak bone mass. Buildup of bone is greatest during adolescence, and if the onset of anorexia occurs during this time and stalls puberty, low bone mass may be permanent.

Hepatic steatosis, or fatty infiltration of the liver, can also occur, and is an indicator of malnutrition in children. Neurological disorders that may occur as complications include seizures and tremors. Wernicke encephalopathy, which results from vitamin B1 deficiency, has been reported in patients who are extremely malnourished: symptoms include confusion, problems with the muscles responsible for eye movements (known as ophthalmoparesis), and abnormalities in walking gait (known as ataxia).

The most common gastrointestinal complications of anorexia are delayed stomach emptying (known as gastroparesis) and constipation, but also include elevated liver function tests, diarrhea, acute pancreatitis, gastroesophageal reflux disease (GERD), difficulty swallowing (dysphagia), and, rarely, superior mesenteric artery syndrome. Acid exposure from GERD and self-induced vomiting can cause dental problems, such as tooth enamel erosion and gum disease. Delayed stomach emptying, or gastroparesis, often develops following food restriction and weight loss; the most common symptom is bloating with gas and abdominal distension, and often occurs after eating. Other symptoms of gastroparesis include early satiety, fullness, nausea, and vomiting. The symptoms may inhibit efforts at eating and recovery, but can be managed by limiting high-fiber foods, using liquid nutritional supplements, or using metoclopramide to increase emptying of food from the stomach. Gastroparesis generally resolves when weight is regained.

==== Cardiac complications ====
Anorexia nervosa increases the risk of sudden cardiac death, though the precise cause is unknown. Cardiac complications include structural and functional changes to the heart. Some of these cardiovascular changes are mild and reversible with treatment, while others may be life-threatening. Cardiac complications can include arrhythmias, abnormally slow heart beat (bradycardia), low blood pressure, atrophy of the heart muscle, reduced heart volume, mitral valve prolapse, myocardial fibrosis, and pericardial effusion.

Abnormalities in conduction and repolarization of the heart that can result from anorexia include QT prolongation, increased QT dispersion, conduction delays, and junctional escape rhythms. Electrolyte abnormalities, particularly hypokalemia and hypomagnesemia, can cause anomalies in the electrical activity of the heart and result in life-threatening arrhythmias. Hypokalemia most commonly results in patients with anorexia when restricting food is accompanied by purging (induced vomiting or laxative use). Hypotension (low blood pressure) is common, and symptoms include fatigue and weakness.

Orthostatic hypotension, a marked decrease in blood pressure when standing from a supine position, may also occur. Symptoms include lightheadedness upon standing, weakness, and cognitive impairment, and may result in fainting or near-fainting. Orthostasis in anorexia indicates worsening cardiac function and may indicate a need for hospitalization. Hypotension and orthostasis generally resolve upon recovery to a normal weight. The weight loss in anorexia also causes atrophy of cardiac muscle: this leads to decreased ability to pump blood, a reduction in the ability to sustain exercise, a diminished ability to increase blood pressure in response to exercise, and a subjective feeling of fatigue. Some individuals may also have a decrease in cardiac contractility.

Cardiac complications can be life-threatening, but the heart muscle generally improves with weight gain, and the heart normalizes in size over weeks to months, with recovery. Atrophy of the heart muscle is a marker of the severity of the disease, and while it is reversible with treatment and refeeding, it is possible that it may cause permanent, microscopic changes to the heart muscle that increase the risk of sudden cardiac death. Individuals with anorexia may experience chest pain or palpitations, which can be a result of mitral valve prolapse. Mitral valve prolapse occurs because the size of the heart muscle decreases while the tissue of the mitral valve remains the same size. Studies have shown rates of mitral valve prolapse of around 20% in those with anorexia, while the rate in the general population is estimated at 2–4%. It has been suggested that there is an association between mitral valve prolapse and sudden cardiac death, but it has not been proven to be causative, either in patients with anorexia or in the general population.

=== Relapse ===
Rates of relapse after treatment range from 30 to 72% over a period of 2–26 months, with a rate of approximately 50% in 12 months after weight restoration. Relapse occurs in approximately a third of people in the hospital and rates are highest in the first 6–18 months after release from an institution. BMI or measures of body fat and leptin levels at discharge were the strongest predictors of relapse, as well as signs of eating psychopathology at discharge. Duration of illness, age, severity, the proportion of AN binge-purge subtype, and presence of comorbidities are also contributing factors.

== Epidemiology ==
Anorexia is estimated to occur in 0.9–4.3% of women and 0.2–0.3% of men in Western countries at some point in their life. About 0.4% of young females are affected in a given year and it is estimated to occur three to ten times less commonly in males. The cause of this disparity is not well-established, but it is thought to be linked to both biological and socio-cultural factors. Rates in most of the developing world are unclear. Often it begins during the teen years or young adulthood. Medical students are a high risk group, with an overall estimated prevalence of 10.4% globally.

The lifetime rate of atypical anorexia nervosa, a form of unspecified feeding or eating disorder in which the person loses a significant amount of weight and is at risk for serious medical complications despite having a higher body-mass index, is much higher at 5–12%. Additionally, a UCSF study showed that severity of illness is independent of current BMI, and "patients with large, rapid, or long-duration of weight loss were more severely ill regardless of their current weight."

While anorexia became more commonly diagnosed during the 20th century, it is unclear if this was due to an increase in its frequency of occurrence or to better diagnostic efforts. Most studies show that the incidence of AN in adult women is fairly constant since at least 1970, while there is some indication that the incidence may have been increasing for girls aged between 14 and 20.

=== Underrepresentation ===
In non-Western countries, including those in Africa (excluding South Africa), eating disorders are less frequently reported and studied compared to Western countries, with available data mostly limited to case reports and isolated studies rather than prevalence investigations. Theories to explain these lower rates of eating disorders, lower reporting, and lower research rates in these countries include the attention to effects of Westernization and culture change on the prevalence of anorexia.

Anorexia among athletes is often overlooked; research emphasizes the importance of taking athletes' diet, weight, and symptoms into account when diagnosing anorexia, instead of just looking at weight and BMI. For athletes, ritualized activities such as weigh-ins place emphasis on gaining and losing large amounts of weight, which may promote the development of eating disorders. Furthermore, the competitive mindset of elite athletes makes them especially vulnerable to anorexia, since the disorder is often linked to a strong desire to maintain control over one's own life. The highly competitive mindset from athletic pursuits can easily translate to the obsessive patterns of disordered eating. Eating becomes "like a game" or "challenge", where the athlete is completely focused on "winning the game"; one elite swimmer with severe anorexia nervosa recalled that "it was always about losing more" and she "never wanted the game to be over".

=== Males ===
While anorexia nervosa is more commonly found in women, it can also affect men, with a lifetime prevalence of 0.3% in men. However, a lack of awareness of eating disorders in males may lead to under-diagnosis and underreporting. This can include a lack of knowledge about what kinds of behaviors males with eating disorders might display, as they differ slightly from those found in females, with a 2009 survey showing that females are more likely to report fasting, body checking, and body avoidance, whereas males are more prone to overeating. Due to this limited knowledge of how anorexia presents in males, it often takes men longer to be diagnosed and receive treatment than women. An additional difference is in the use of supplements to affect body weight, with women being more prone to using diet pills and men being more prone to using anabolic steroids.

Moreover, men who exhibit symptoms of anorexia may not meet the BMI criteria outlined in the DSM-IV, due to having more muscle mass and therefore a higher bodyweight. Consequently, a subclinical diagnosis, such as Eating Disorder Not Otherwise Specified (ED-NOS) in the DSM-IV or Other Specified Feeding or Eating Disorder (OSFED) in the DSM-5, is often made instead.

Men with anorexia may also experience body dysmorphia, reporting their bodies to be twice as large as in actuality, and body dissatisfaction, especially with regard to muscularity and body composition. Men tend to place more emphasis on a muscular build as opposed to pursuing thinness. As in the case of women, men are more prone to develop an eating disorder if their occupation or sport emphasizes having a slim physique or lighter weight, like modeling, dancing, horse racing, wrestling, and gymnastics. Hormonal changes may also be observed in males with anorexia, with marked changes in their serum testosterone, luteinizing hormone, and follicle-stimulating hormone. Such extreme endocrine disturbances can potentially result in infertility.

Anorexic men are sometimes colloquially referred to as manorexic or as having bigorexia.

=== Elderly ===
An increasing trend has been observed of anorexia among the elderly, termed "Anorexia of Aging", which is characterized by behaviors similar to those seen in typical anorexia nervosa, but often accompanied by excessive laxative use. Most geriatric anorexia patients limit their food intake to dairy or grains, whereas an adolescent with anorexia has a more general limitation. The signs and symptoms that go along with anorexia of aging are similar to what is observed in typical anorexia, including sudden weight loss, unexplained hair loss or dental problems, and a desire to eat alone.

There are two types of anorexia that are seen to affect older adults – early onset and late onset. Early onset refers to a recurrence of anorexia in late life in an individual who experienced the disease during their youth. Late onset refers to occurrences of anorexia that begin for the first time later in life.

The stimulus for anorexia in elderly patients is typically a loss of control over their lives, which can be brought on by many events, including moving into an assisted living facility. This is also a time when most older individuals experience a rise in conflict with family members, such as limitations on driving or on personal freedom, which increases the likelihood of anorexia or disordered eating. There can be physical issues in the elderly that lead to anorexia of aging, including a decline in chewing ability, a decline in taste and smell, and a decrease in appetite. Psychological reasons for the elderly to develop anorexia can include depression and bereavement, and may even represent an indirect attempt at suicide. There are also common comorbid psychiatric conditions with anorexia among the elderly, including major depression, anxiety disorder, OCD, bipolar disorder, schizophrenia, and dementia.

There are several medical conditions that can result from anorexia in the elderly, with an increased risk of illness and death resulting from the disorder. There is also a decline in muscle and bone mass as a result of a reduction in protein intake during anorexia. Another result of anorexia in the aging population is irreparable damage to kidneys, heart or colon, and an imbalance of electrolytes.

Many assessments are available to diagnose anorexia among the older population. These assessments include the Simplified Nutritional Assessment Questionnaire (SNAQ) and Functional Assessment of Anorexia/Cachexia Therapy (FAACT). Specific to the geriatric populace, the interRAI system identifies detrimental conditions in assisted living facilities and nursing homes. Even a simple screening for nutritional insufficiencies, such as low levels of important vitamins, can help to identify someone who has anorexia of aging.

Anorexia in the elderly should be identified by the retirement communities but is often overlooked, especially in patients with dementia. Some studies report that malnutrition is prevalent in nursing homes, with up to 58% of residents suffering from it, which can contribute to the difficulty of identifying anorexia in those populations. One of the challenges with assisted living facilities is that they often serve bland, monotonous food, which lessens residents' desire to eat.

The treatment for anorexia of aging is undifferentiated from anorexia treatment for any other age group. Some of the treatment options include outpatient and inpatient facilities, antidepressant medication, and behavioral therapy, such as meal observation and discussing eating habits.

== History ==
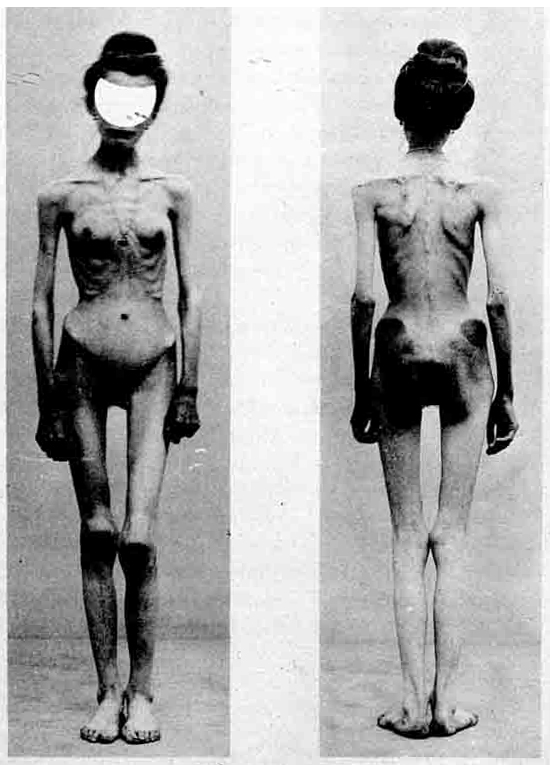
Two images of an anorexic woman published in 1900 in "Nouvelle Iconographie de la Salpêtrière". The case was titled "Un cas d'anorexie hysterique" (A case of hysteric anorexia).

The history of anorexia begins with descriptions of religious fasting, dating from the Hellenistic era and continuing into the medieval period. The medieval practice of self-starvation by women, including some young women, in the name of religious piety and purity is sometimes referred to as anorexia mirabilis. The earliest medical descriptions of anorexic illnesses are generally credited to English physician Richard Morton in 1689.

Etymologically, anorexia is a term of Greek origin: an- (ἀν-, prefix denoting negation) and orexis (ὄρεξις, "appetite"), translating literally to "a loss of appetite". In and of itself, this term does not have a harmful connotation, e.g., exercise-induced anorexia simply means that hunger is naturally suppressed during and after sufficiently intense exercise sessions. It is the adjective nervosa that indicates the functional and non-organic nature of the disorder, but this adjective is also often omitted when the context is clear. Despite the literal translation of anorexia, the feeling of hunger in anorexia nervosa is frequently present and the pathological control of this instinct is a source of satisfaction for the patients.

The term "anorexia nervosa" was coined in 1873 by Sir William Gull, one of Queen Victoria's personal physicians. Gull published a seminal paper providing a number of detailed case descriptions of patients with anorexia nervosa. In the same year, French physician Ernest-Charles Lasègue similarly published details of a number of cases in a paper entitled De l'Anorexie hystérique.

In the late 19th century, anorexia nervosa became widely accepted by the medical profession as a recognized condition, with mentions in the medical literature notably arising from the Salpêtrière clinic in Paris by physicians such as Jean-Martin Charcot. Awareness of the condition was largely limited to the medical profession until the latter part of the 20th century, when German-American psychoanalyst Hilde Bruch published The Golden Cage: the Enigma of Anorexia Nervosa in 1978. Despite major advances in neuroscience, Bruch's theories tend to dominate popular thinking. In 1983, a significant event that further increased public awareness was the death of the popular singer and drummer Karen Carpenter from complications of anorexia, which prompted widespread media coverage of eating disorders.

== See also ==
- Body image
- Eating recovery
- Evolutionary psychiatry
- Idée fixe
- Inedia
- List of people with anorexia nervosa
- List of deaths from anorexia nervosa
- National Association of Anorexia Nervosa and Associated Disorders
- Muscle dysmorphia
- Orthorexia nervosa
- Pro-ana
