= Unspecified feeding or eating disorder =

Unspecified feeding or eating disorder (UFED)
- Specialty: Psychiatry

Unspecified feeding or eating disorder (UFED) is a DSM-5 category of eating disorders that, along with other specified feeding or eating disorder (OSFED), replaced eating disorder not otherwise specified (EDNOS) in the DSM-IV-TR.

UFED is an eating disorder that does not meet the criteria for anorexia nervosa, bulimia nervosa, binge eating disorder, or other eating disorders. People with UFED can have similar symptoms and behaviors to those with anorexia and bulimia, and can face the same risks associated with those disorders.

== Signs and symptoms ==
UFED is a disorder that's characterized by a disturbance or alteration in eating behaviors that leads to a significant impairment in physical or mental functioning, but cannot be defined under another specified feeding and eating disorder diagnosis.

== Diagnosis ==
UFED is diagnosed when a clinician chooses not to specify the reason that criteria aren't met for a specific eating and feeding disorder. This also includes situations where a clinician does not have sufficient information to make a specific diagnosis, such as an emergency room scenario.

== Epidemiology ==
Although EDNOS (formerly called atypical eating disorder) was originally introduced in the DSM-III to capture unusual cases, it accounts for up to 60% of cases in eating disorder specialty clinics. EDNOS is an especially prevalent category in populations that have received inadequate research attention such as young children, males, ethnic minorities, and non-Western groups.

== Treatment ==
When treating any eating disorder, including unspecified disorders, it is important to include a registered dietician or nutritionist working with the treatment team. Even though eating disorders are a psychological diagnosis, psychologists are not certified or licensed in dietetics or nutrition, so it is important that psychologists are not practicing outside their bounds of competence. Medical Nutrition Therapy is vital in the treatment and management of eating disorders. The dietician assists the patient by creating a meal plan that is tailored to their individual needs and treatment goals. The dietician will also provide psychoeducation that challenges nutrition misinformation and will ideally create a space where the patient feels comfortable asking questions.

== See also ==
- Dieting
- Exercise addiction
- Food addiction
- Hypergymnasia
- Orthorexia
- OSFED
