= Orthorexia nervosa =

Proposed eating disorder

Orthorexia nervosa (ON; also known as orthorexia) is a proposed eating disorder characterized by an excessive preoccupation with eating healthy food.

The term was introduced in 1997 by American physician Steven Bratman, who suggested that some people's dietary restrictions intended to promote health may paradoxically lead to unhealthy consequences, such as social isolation, anxiety, loss of ability to eat in a natural, intuitive manner, reduced interest in the full range of other healthy human activities, and, in rare cases, severe malnutrition or even death.

Ursula Philpot, chair of the British Dietetic Association described people with orthorexia nervosa as being "solely concerned with the quality of the food they put in their bodies, refining and restricting their diets according to their personal understanding of which foods are truly 'pure'." This differs from other eating disorders, such as anorexia nervosa and bulimia nervosa, where those affected focus on the quantity of food eaten.

Orthorexia nervosa also differs from anorexia nervosa in that it does not disproportionally affect one gender. Studies have found that orthorexia nervosa is equally found in both men and women with no significant gender differences at all. Furthermore, research has found significant positive correlations between orthorexia nervosa and both narcissism and perfectionism, but no significant correlation between orthorexia nervosa and self-esteem.

Orthorexia nervosa is not recognized as an official diagnosis in the Diagnostic and Statistical Manual of Mental Disorders (DSM-IV or DSM-5), nor in the International Classification of Diseases (ICD-10 or ICD-11). Although proposals have been made for its consideration as a novel mental illness, consensus is not yet clear, and orthorexia's strong overlap with other conditions may indicate that individuals should instead be diagnosed with another restrictive eating disorder.

== Signs and symptoms ==
Symptoms of orthorexia nervosa include "obsessive focus on food choice, planning, purchase, preparation, and consumption; food regarded primarily as source of health rather than pleasure; distress or disgust when in proximity to prohibited foods; exaggerated faith that inclusion or elimination of particular kinds of food can prevent or cure disease or affect daily well-being; periodic shifts in dietary beliefs while other processes persist unchanged; moral judgment of others based on dietary choices; body image distortion around sense of physical "impurity" rather than weight; persistent belief that dietary practices are health-promoting despite evidence of malnutrition."

== Cause ==
While the current research on the causes of orthorexia nervosa is limited, significant evidence supports the idea of associated risk factors. Generally, eating disorders are influenced by a variety of factors including: biological, psychological, and sociocultural influences.

Biological Influences

The biological components relating to orthorexia nervosa specifically have not been directly identified. However, studies of other eating disorders such as anorexia nervosa, bulimia nervosa, and binge eating disorder have noticed several biological influences. These factors include hormone levels, neurotransmitters, and even genetic components. Additionally, researchers have found strong correlations between orthorexia nervosa and obsessive-compulsive disorder.

Psychological Influences

Orthorexic tendencies typically occur in individuals with lower self-esteem, stemming from social comparison. Excessive dieting may also reflect patterns of perfectionism and the need for control. These same tendencies also act as ways to cope with difficult emotions or traumatic experiences. Some have even noticed associations between orthorexia nervosa and substance abuse.

Sociocultural Influences

Similar to anorexia nervosa and bulimia nervosa, orthorexia nervosa typically also stems from social pressures, distorted body image, and desires to be thin. The Tripartite Influence Model identifies parents, peers, and media as key influences on body image and disordered eating.

== Diagnosis ==
In 2016, formal criteria for orthorexia were proposed in the peer-reviewed journal Eating Behaviors by Thom Dunn and Steven Bratman. These criteria are as follows:

Criterion A. Obsessive focus on "healthy" eating, as defined by a dietary theory or set of beliefs whose specific details may vary; marked by exaggerated emotional distress in relationship to food choices perceived as unhealthy; weight loss may ensue, but this is conceptualized as an aspect of ideal health rather than as the primary goal. As evidenced by the following:

1. Compulsive behavior and/or mental preoccupation regarding affirmative and restrictive dietary practices believed by the individual to promote optimum health. (Footnotes to this criterion add: Dietary practices may include use of concentrated "food supplements". Exercise performance and/or fit body image may be regarded as an aspect or indicator of health.)
2. Violation of self-imposed dietary rules causes exaggerated fear of disease, sense of personal impurity and/or negative physical sensations, accompanied by anxiety and shame.
3. Dietary restrictions escalate over time, and may come to include elimination of entire food groups and involve progressively more frequent and/or severe "cleanses" (partial fasts) regarded as purifying or detoxifying. This escalation commonly leads to weight loss, but the desire to lose weight is absent, hidden or subordinated to ideation about healthy food.

Criterion B. The compulsive behavior and mental preoccupation becomes clinically impairing by any of the following:

1. Malnutrition, severe weight loss or other medical complications from restricted diet
2. Intrapersonal distress or impairment of social, academic or vocational functioning secondary to beliefs or behaviors about healthy diet
3. Positive body image, self-worth, identity and/or satisfaction excessively dependent on compliance with self-defined "healthy" eating behavior.

A diagnostic questionnaire has been developed for orthorexia sufferers, similar to questionnaires for other eating disorders, named the ORTO-15. However, Dunn and Bratman critique this survey tool as lacking appropriate internal and external validation.

== Epidemiology ==
Results across scientific findings have yet to find a definitive conclusion to support whether nutrition students and professionals are at higher risk than other population subgroups, due to differing results in the research literature. There are only a few notable scientific works that, in an attempt to explore the breadth and depth of the still vaguely-understood illness, have tried to identify which groups in society are most vulnerable to its onset. This includes a 2008 German study, which based its research on the widespread suspicion that the most nutritionally-informed, such as university nutrition students, are a potential high-risk group for eating disorders, due to a substantial accumulation of knowledge on food and its relationship to health; the idea being that the more one knows about health, the more likely an unhealthy fixation about being healthy can develop. This study also inferred that orthorexic tendencies may even fuel a desire to study the science, indicating that many within this field might suffer from the disorder before commencing the course. However the results found that the students in the study, upon initial embarkation of their degree, did not have higher orthorexic values than other non-nutrition university students, and thus the report concluded that further research is needed to clarify the relationship between food-education and the onset of ON.

Similarly, in a Portuguese study on nutrition tertiary students, the participants' orthorexic scores (according to the ORTO-15 diagnostic questionnaire) actually decreased as they progressed through their course, as well as the overall risk of developing an eating disorder being 4.2 percent, categorised by the authors as a low level. The participants also answered questionnaires to provide insight into their eating behaviours and attitudes, and despite this study finding that nutrition and health-science students tend to have more restrictive eating behaviours, these studies however found no evidence to support that these students have "more disturbed or disordered eating patterns than other students". These two aforementioned studies conclude that the more understanding of food one has is not necessarily a risk factor for ON, explaining that the data gathered suggests dietetics professionals are not at significant risk of it.

However, these epidemiologic studies have been critiqued as using a fundamentally flawed survey tool that inflates prevalence rates. Scholars have questioned both the reliability and validity of the ORTO-15.

Most scientific findings tend to agree, however, young adults and adolescents are extremely susceptible to developing eating disorders. One study found that there was no relationship between BOT score and college major, which may indicate the prevalence of mental health issues and eating disorders on college campuses and that health and science majors are no longer the only ones affected. More studies have also been conducted on the link between increased Instagram use and Orthorexia nervosa. The social media based healthy community has recently grown in popularity especially on platforms such as Instagram. The hashtag #food is one of the top 25 most popular hashtags on Instagram. With young adults and adolescents making up the majority of social media users, exposure to this type of content can lead to developing unhealthy behavior.

== History ==
American physician Steven Bratman described the condition and coined the term "orthorexia nervosa" (Note: Bratman constructed the term from the Greek ortho, for 'right' or 'correct', and the existing condition anorexia nervosa. In both disorders orexis refers literally to 'appetite', and "nervosa" (from Latin) indicates an unhealthy psychological ("nervous") state.) in a 1997 article in the magazine Yoga Journal. He described orthorexia as an unhealthy fixation with what the individual considers to be healthy eating. Beliefs about what constitutes healthy eating commonly originate in one or another exclusionary dietary theory—such as raw foodism or macrobiotics—taken to extremes, leading to disordered eating patterns and psychological or physical impairment. Bratman based this proposed condition on his personal experiences in the 1970s, as well as behaviors he observed among his patients in the 1990s.

Following the publication of the book, in 2004 a team of Italian researchers from La Sapienza University of Rome, published the first empirical study attempting to develop a tool to measure the prevalence of orthorexia, known as the ORTO-15.

In 2015, responding to news articles in which the term orthorexia is applied to people who merely follow a non-mainstream theory of healthy eating, Bratman specified the following: "A theory may be conventional or unconventional, extreme or lax, sensible or totally wacky, but, regardless of the details, followers of the theory do not necessarily have orthorexia. They are simply adherents of a dietary theory. The term 'orthorexia' only applies when an eating disorder develops around that theory." Bratman elsewhere clarifies that with a few exceptions, most common theories of healthy eating are followed safely by the majority of their adherents; however, "for some people, going down the path of a restrictive diet in search of health may escalate into dietary perfectionism." Karin Kratina, PhD, writing for the National Eating Disorders Association, summarizes this process as follows: "Eventually food choices become so restrictive, in both variety and calories, that health suffers – an ironic twist for a person so completely dedicated to healthy eating."

Although orthorexia is not recognized as a mental disorder by the American Psychiatric Association, and it is not listed in the DSM-5, as of January 2016, four case reports and more than 40 other articles on the subject have been published in a variety of peer-reviewed journals internationally. According to a study published in 2011, two-thirds of a sample of 111 Dutch-speaking eating disorder specialists felt they had observed the syndrome in their clinical practice.

According to the Macmillan English Dictionary, the word is entering the English lexicon. The concept of orthorexia as a newly developing eating disorder has attracted significant media attention in the 21st century.

== Orthorexia and other disorders ==
Orthorexia differs from anorexia and bulimia in its relationship to food. Instead of focusing on food intake in an attempt to lose weight and eat less, orthorexia is an "obsession about the quality of food intake" and is fueled by a feeling of achieving perfection and purity by only consuming "healthy" foods.

Orthorexic behaviors can often lead to malnutrition and weight loss, and it is often associated with anorexia nervosa. Studies have also shown that obsessive-compulsive tendencies are linked to the development of orthorexia, and some researchers suggest that orthorexia should be diagnosed as OCD because it is driven by an obsession for attaining a perfect diet.

== See also ==
- Avoidant/restrictive food intake disorder
- Chemophobia
- Clean eating
- Comfort food
- Coping (psychology)
- Diet
- Emotional eating
- Food guide pyramid
- Fruitarianism, can represent or cause orthorexia nervosa in some adaptations
- Macrobiotic diet
