= Purging disorder =

Type of eating disorder

Purging disorder is an eating disorder, more specifically a form of other specified feeding or eating disorder. It is characterised by the DSM-5 as self-induced vomiting, or misuse of laxatives, diuretics, or enemas to forcefully evacuate matter from the body. The lifetime prevalence (percentage of individuals in a population who have experienced the disorder at any point in their lives) of purging disorder has been estimated from 1.1% to 5.3%.

Purging disorder differs from bulimia nervosa (BN) because individuals do not consume a large amount of food (also called a binge) prior to purging.

Some of the signs of this disorder include trips to the bathroom directly after a meal, frequent use of laxatives, and obsession over one's appearance and weight. Other signs, all of which are the result of excessive vomiting, consist of swollen cheeks, popped blood vessels in the eyes, and clear teeth.

Purging disorder is studied far less than other eating disorders hence little information is known about the risk factors, including the effect of gender, race, and class. However, as with most eating disorders, it disproportionately affects women, preoccupation with shape and weight puts this group at elevated risk for eating disorders, including this one. In one study of the risk factors for purging disorder, 77% of the participants who presented with symptoms of purging disorder were female.

It has been argued that purging disorder should be considered a distinct eating disorder, separate from bulimia nervosa.

== Signs, Symptoms and Causes ==
=== Signs ===
Some of the signs of this disorder include inappropriate influence of body shape and weight, recurrent purging to influence body weight or shape and Russell's sign.

=== Symptoms ===
The symptoms include the absence of binging episodes as well as purging behaviours occurring at least once per week for at minimum 3 months.

=== Causes ===
==== Risk factors ====
Some of the risk factors include dieting, thin-ideal internalization and body dissatisfaction.

Genetic

The heritability of some eating disorders has been well established, but to date there are no documented family studies of purging disorder to understand the familial nature of purging disorder.

== Diagnosis ==
The DSM-5 is used as a reference to diagnose Purging Disorder. A patient with Purging disorder will be diagnosed with other specified feeding or eating disorder.

=== Complications ===
Purging behaviors, specifically self-induced vomiting and laxative use are associated with the following medical complications:

- Subconjunctival hemorrhages (small bleeds in the eyes)
- Cuts or scars on the top of the hands (Russell's sign)
- Dental abnormalities such as enamel erosion
- Swelling of the parotid gland
- Mild esophagitis, heartburn, or acid reflux
- Renal (kidney) inflammation

Purging disorder progressing into bulimia nervosa has been observed. However, the reverse situation, bulimia nervosa progressing into purging disorder, is extremely rare. This was observed once in a transgender patient with a severe history of bulimia nervosa but presented with symptoms of purging disorder to an eating disorder treatment facility in New Zealand.

== Treatment ==
Treatment for purging disorder can be multidisciplinary. One approach to treatment is cognitive behavioral therapy.

== Prognosis ==
Children and teenagers with purging disorder have been found to have poorer health-related quality of life than their healthy peers. A small review of 11 cases of purging disorder where death occurred found that only 5 of the 11 deaths could be attributed to the purging disorder. The remaining 6 deaths were a result of suicide.
