= Binge eating disorder =

Eating disorder characterized by overeating

- Periwinkle ribbon for awareness of pulmonary hypertension, eating disorders, and esophageal cancer
- Specialty: Psychiatry, clinical psychology, adolescent medicine
- Symptoms: Eating much faster than normal, eating until feeling uncomfortably full, eating a large amount when not hungry
- Complications: Obesity, tooth decay, diabetes, non-alcoholic fatty liver disease, acid reflux, heartburn, amenorrhea, disruptions in sleep
- Causes: Unclear
- Risk factors: Low self-esteem, family history of eating disorders, childhood abuse or trauma, anxiety, depression, substance use
- Differential diagnosis: Bulimia nervosa
- Medication: Lisdexamfetamine, selective serotonin reuptake inhibitors

Binge eating disorder (BED) is an eating disorder characterized by frequent and recurrent binge eating episodes with associated psychological and social dysfunction, but without the compensatory behaviors common to bulimia nervosa, OSFED, or the binge–purge subtype of anorexia nervosa.

BED is a recently identified condition, distinguished nosologically to separate the binge eating that defines it from the binge eating seen in bulimia nervosa, which involves post-binge purging. Individuals diagnosed with bulimia nervosa or binge eating disorder show similar patterns of compulsive overeating, neurobiological features such as impaired cognitive control and food addiction, as well as biological and environmental risk factors. Some professionals consider BED to be a milder form of bulimia, with the two conditions on the same spectrum.

Binge eating is one of the most prevalent eating disorders among adults, though it receives less media coverage and research attention than anorexia nervosa and bulimia nervosa.

== Signs and symptoms ==
Binge eating is the core symptom of BED; however, not everyone who binge eats meets qualifications for BED. An individual may occasionally binge eat without experiencing many of the negative physical, psychological, or social effects of BED. This may be considered disordered eating rather than a clinical disorder. Precisely defining binge eating can be problematic; however, binge eating episodes in BED are generally described as having the following potential features:

- Eating much faster than normal, perhaps in a short space of time
- Eating until feeling uncomfortably full
- Eating a large amount even when not hungry
- Subjective loss of control over how much or what is eaten
- Planning and allocating specific times for bingeing
- Eating alone or secretly
- Not being able to remember what was eaten after the binge
- Feelings of guilt, shame, or disgust following a food binge
- Body image disturbance

In contrast to bulimia nervosa, binge eating episodes are not regularly followed by activities intended to compensate for the amount of food consumed, such as self-induced vomiting, laxative or enema misuse, or strenuous exercise. BED is characterized more by overeating than dietary restriction. Those with BED often have poor body image and frequently diet, but are unsuccessful due to the severity of their binge eating.

Obesity is common in persons with BED, as are depression, low self-esteem, stress and boredom. Regarding cognitive abilities, individuals showing severe binge eating symptoms may experience small dysfunctions in executive functions. Those with BED are also at risk of non-alcoholic fatty liver disease, menstrual irregularities such as amenorrhea, and gastrointestinal problems such as acid reflux and heartburn.

== Causes ==
As with other eating disorders, binge eating is considered an "expressive disorder": a disorder that is an expression of deeper psychological problems. People who have binge eating disorder have been found to have higher weight bias internalization, which is characterized by low self-esteem, unhealthy eating patterns, and body dissatisfaction. Binge eating disorder commonly develops as a result of or side effect of depression, as it is common for people to turn to comfort foods when they are feeling down.

There was resistance to granting binge eating disorder the status of a fully fledged eating disorder because many perceived binge eating disorder to be caused by individual choices. Previous research has focused on the relationship between body image and eating disorders, and concludes that disordered eating might be linked to rigid dieting practices. In the majority of cases of anorexia, extreme and inflexible restriction of dietary intake leads at some point to the development of binge eating, weight regain, bulimia nervosa, or a mixed form of eating disorder not otherwise specified. When under a strict diet that mimics the effects of starvation, the body may be preparing for a new behavioral pattern, one that involves consuming a large amount of food in a relatively short period of time.

Some studies show that BED aggregates in families and could be genetic. However, very few published studies of the genetics of BED exist. Research suggests that environmental factors and the impact of traumatic events can precipitate binge eating disorder. One study showed that women with binge eating disorder experienced more adverse life events in the year before the onset of the disorder, and that binge eating disorder was positively associated with how frequently negative events occurred. Additionally, the authors found that individuals who had binge eating disorder were more likely to have experienced physical abuse, perceived risk of physical abuse, stress, and body criticism. Other risk factors may include childhood obesity, critical comments about weight, low self-esteem, depression, and physical or sexual abuse in childhood. A systematic review concluded that bulimia nervosa and binge eating disorder are impacted by family separations, losses and big life changes, and negative parent-child interactions A few studies have suggested that there could be a genetic component to binge eating disorder, though other studies have shown more ambiguous results. Studies have shown that binge eating tends to run in families, and a twin study by Cynthia M. Bulik, Patrick F. Sullivan, and Kenneth Kendler has shown a "moderate heritability for binge eating" of 41 percent. Troop and colleagues have shown that eating disorders such as anorexia and bulimia reduce coping abilities, which makes it more likely for those suffering to turn to binge eating as a coping strategy.

"In the U.S, it is estimated that 3.5% of young women and 30% to 40% of people who seek weight loss treatments can be clinically diagnosed with binge eating disorder."

== Diagnosis ==
=== International Classification of Diseases ===
The 2017 update to the American version of the ICD-10 includes binge eating disorder (BED) under F50.81. ICD-11 contain a dedicated entry (6B82), defining BED as frequent, recurrent episodes of binge eating occurring at least once a week or more over several months which are not regularly followed by inappropriate compensatory behaviors aimed at preventing weight gain.

According to the World Health Organization's ICD-11 classification of BED, the severity of the disorder can be classified as mild (1–3 episodes/week), moderate (4–7 episodes/week), severe (8–13 episodes/week) and extreme (>14 episodes/week).

=== Diagnostic and Statistical Manual ===
Initially considered a subject for further research exploration, binge eating disorder was first included in the Diagnostic and Statistical Manual of Mental Disorders (DSM) in 1994, proposed a feature of an eating disorder. In 2013, it gained formal recognition as a psychiatric condition in the DSM-5. Until 2013, binge eating disorder was categorized as an Eating Disorder Not Otherwise Specified, an umbrella category for eating disorders that don't fall under the categories for anorexia nervosa or bulimia nervosa. Before DSM-5, Eating Disorder Not Otherwise Specified, which included BED, was diagnosed more often than both anorexia nervosa and bulimia nervosa. Because it was not a recognized psychiatric disorder in the DSM until 2013, it has been difficult to obtain insurance reimbursement for treatments. The disorder now has its own category under DSM-5, which outlines the signs and symptoms that must be present to classify a person's behavior as binge eating disorder. Studies have confirmed the high predictive value of these criteria for diagnosing BED.

One study found that the method for diagnosing BED is for a clinician who typically diagnose using the DSM-5 criteria or taking the Eating Disorder Examination. The Structured Clinical Interview for DSM (SCID-5) takes no more than 75 minutes to complete and has a systematic approach which follows the DSM-5 criteria. The Eating Disorder Examination is a semi-structured interview that identifies the frequency of binges and associated eating disorder features.

The DSM-5 characterizes diagnosis under several categories—mild, moderate, severe, and extreme—each determined by the number of binges the patient exhibits per week. Mild: 1–3 episodes per week, Moderate: 4–7 episodes per week, Severe: 8–13 episodes per week, Extreme: 14 or more episodes per week

Further, the remission states are classified under the following. Partial Remission: Following a previous diagnosis, the average frequency of binge eating episodes decreases to less than one episode per week for a sustained period. Full Remission: Following a previous diagnosis, none of the criteria have been met for a sustained period.

== Management ==
Counseling and some medication, such as certain stimulants (e.g., lisdexamfetamine), selective serotonin reuptake inhibitors (SSRIs), and GLP-1 receptor agonists, may help people with BED. Some recommend a multidisciplinary approach in the treatment of the disorder.

=== Medication ===
==== Lisdexamfetamine ====
As of July 2024, lisdexamfetamine is the only pharmacotherapy approved by the US Food and Drug Administration (FDA) and the Therapeutic Goods Administration for BED. Evidence indicates that its effectiveness in treating BED may be partially due to a psychopathological overlap with attention deficit hyperactivity disorder, a cognitive-control disorder that also benefits from treatment with lisdexamfetamine.

Medical reviews of randomized controlled trials have established that lisdexamfetamine, administered at doses between 50 and 70 mg, is safe and effective for treating BED. These reviews consistently report fewer weekly binge eating episodes. Furthermore, a meta-analytic systematic review included a 12-month study showing the medication was effective for a long period of time. Two reviews have found lisdexamfetamine to be superior to placebo in several secondary outcomes, including persistent binge eating cessation and reductions in obsessive-compulsive binge eating symptoms, body weight, and triglycerides.

Lisdexamfetamine is a pharmacologically inert prodrug that confers its therapeutic effects for BED after conversion to its active metabolite, dextroamphetamine, which acts in the central nervous system. Dextroamphetamine increases the availability of dopamine and norepinephrine in the prefrontal cortex, which makes major decision-making for the body. Lisdexamfetamine, like all pharmaceutical amphetamines, possesses direct appetite suppressant effects, which may be therapeutically beneficial for BED and its associated comorbidities. Neuroimaging studies involving BED-diagnosed participants suggest that long-term effects in the brain that result in people getting better even after stopping their initial medication

==== Off-label medications ====
Three other classes of medications are also used to treat binge eating disorder: antidepressants, anticonvulsants, and anti-obesity medications. Antidepressant medications of the selective serotonin reuptake inhibitor (SSRI) class have been found to effectively reduce episodes of binge eating and reduce weight. Similarly, anticonvulsant medications such as topiramate and zonisamide may be able to effectively suppress appetite. The long-term effectiveness of medication for binge eating disorder is currently unknown. For BED patients with bipolar mania, risperidone is recommended. If BED patients have bipolar depression, lamotrigine is the appropriate choice.

Trials of antidepressants, anticonvulsants, and anti-obesity medications suggest that these medications are superior to placebo in reducing binge eating. Medications are not considered the treatment of choice because psychotherapeutic approaches, such as CBT, are more effective than medications for binge eating disorder. A meta-analysis concluded that using medications did not reduce binge-eating episodes and BMI posttreatment at 6–12 months. This indicates the possibility of relapse from not taking the medication anymore. Medications also do not increase the effectiveness of psychotherapy, though some patients may benefit from anticonvulsant and anti-obesity medications, such as phentermine/topiramate, for weight loss.

Blocking opioid receptors decreases food intake. Additionally, naltrexone/bupropion together may cause weight loss. Combining these alongside psychotherapies like CBT may lead to better outcomes for BED.

GLP-1 receptor agonist medications such as semaglutide (Ozempic), dulaglutide (Trulicity), and liraglutide (Saxenda) have been used for treating BED in recent years. Often prescribed for lowering appetite and subsequent weight loss in people with diabetes mellitus and obesity, they can successfully stop or reduce obsessive thoughts about food, binging urges, and other impulsive behaviors. Some users, reported sudden improvement in "food noise" - constant unstoppable thoughts about food, even not being physically hungry, which can be a symptom of BED. To this promising treatment is on the up for success, but additional research is needed as of January 2024.

=== Counseling ===
Cognitive behavioral therapy (CBT) treatment has been demonstrated as a more effective form of treatment for BED than behavioral weight loss programs. About 50% of individuals with BED achieve complete remission from binge eating and 68-90% will reduce the amount of binge eating episodes they have. CBT has also been shown to be an effective method to address self-image issues and psychiatric comorbidities (e.g., depression) associated with the disorder. The goal of CBT is to interrupt binge-eating behavior, learn to create a normal eating schedule, change the perception around weight and shape, and develop positive attitudes about one's body. While CBT has been effective in eliminating BED, it most of the time does not result in a person losing weight. Recent reviews have concluded that psychological interventions such as psychotherapy and behavioral interventions are more effective than pharmacological interventions for the treatment of binge eating disorder. A meta-analysis concluded that psychotherapy based on CBT not only significantly improved binge-eating symptomatology but also reduced a client's BMI significantly at posttreatment and longer than 6 and 12 months after treatment. Behavioral weight loss treatment has been proven to be effective as a means to achieve weight loss amongst patients with BED.

=== Surgery ===
Bariatric surgery has also been proposed as another approach to treat BED, and a recent meta-analysis showed that approximately two-thirds of individuals who seek this type of surgery for weight loss purposes have BED. Bariatric surgery recipients who had BED before receiving the surgery tend to have poorer weight-loss outcomes and are more likely to continue to exhibit eating behaviors characteristic of BED.

=== Lifestyle interventions ===
Other BED treatments include lifestyle changes like weight training, peer support groups, and investigation of hormonal abnormalities.

== Prognosis ==
Individuals with BED often have a lower overall quality of life and face social difficulties. Early behavior changes can predict a full recovery for the future.

Individuals who have BED commonly have other conditions such as depression, personality disorder, bipolar disorder, substance abuse, body dysmorphic disorder, kleptomania, irritable bowel syndrome, fibromyalgia, or an anxiety disorder. They may also have history of attempted suicide and reoccurring panic attacks.

While people of a normal weight may overeat occasionally, an ongoing habit of consuming large amounts of food in a short period of time may ultimately lead to weight gain and obesity. The main physical health consequences of this type of eating disorder are brought on by the weight gain resulting from calorie-laden bingeing episodes. Mental and emotional consequences of binge eating disorder include social weight stigma and emotional loss of control. Up to 70% of individuals with BED may also be obese, and therefore obesity-associated morbidities such as high blood pressure and coronary artery disease, type 2 diabetes mellitus, gastrointestinal issues (e.g., gallbladder disease), high cholesterol levels, musculoskeletal problems and obstructive sleep apnea may also be present. One study found a 42% obesity rate in those who have received a BED diagnosis. Additionally, a higher morbid obesity prevalence was observed in this population compared to a population without eating disorders.

== Epidemiology ==
=== General ===
The prevalence of BED in the general population is approximately 1-3%.

BED cases usually occur between the ages of 12.4 and 24.7, but prevalence rates increase until the age of 40.

=== Age ===
Binge eating disorder is the most common eating disorder in adults.

The limited amount of research that has been done on BED shows that rates of binge eating disorder are fairly comparable among men and women. The lifetime prevalence of binge eating disorder has been observed in studies to be 2.0 percent for men and 3.5 percent for women, higher than that of the commonly recognized eating disorders, anorexia nervosa and bulimia nervosa. However another systematic literature review found the prevalence average to be about 2.3% in women and about 0.3% in men. Lifetime prevalence rates for BED in women can range anywhere from 1.5 to 6 times higher than in men. One literature review found that point prevalence rates for BED vary from 0.1 percent to 24.1 percent depending on the sample. This same review also found that the 12-month prevalence rates vary between 0.1 percent to 8.8 percent. Adolescents also have a high risk of binge eating behavior. Incidence rates of 10.1 and 6.6 per 10,000 person years have been observed in male and female adolescents in the U.S., respectively.

=== Sexuality ===
Recent studies found that eating disorders, with the inclusion of BED, are found to be prominent in LGBTQ groups due to higher rates of depression when compared to the general population. This could be due to the stress and discrimination this population experiences. Furthermore, adolescent and young adult sexual minority males binge at higher rates than their heterosexual counterparts.

=== Race and ethnicity ===
Given that the research for BED is not supported on the topic of ethnicity, it makes it difficult to understand how common BED is. However, the racial makeup of BED distinctly varies from anorexia nervosa and bulimia nervosa. BED has the same effect no matter the color of someone's skin. Many studies surround BED being focused on white women. One literature review found information citing no difference between BED prevalence among Hispanic, African American, and White women while other information found that BED prevalence was highest among Hispanics followed by Black individuals and finally White people. A 2021 study has observed "higher rates of BED as compared to other ethnic groups" for African Americans. The likelihood of reporting eating disorder symptoms is also lower in some groups, including African Americans. Asian-Americans also face decreased reporting of ED symptoms. This can be partly attributed to "significantly higher thin-ideal internalization" compared to other ethnic groups.

Migration can also influence BED risk. Mexican-American immigrants have been observed to face a greater risk of BED following migration.

=== Socioeconomic status ===
People with low socioeconomic status often face many problems in the diagnosis and treatment of eating disorders like BED. These barriers include longer clinical waiting times, worse care, and less clinical investigation for individuals that "defy illness stereotypes". The costs associated with specialized mental health care pose another barrier for low socioeconomic status individuals. Furthermore, associated factors such as food insecurity and environmental stress have been shown to contribute to higher rates of eating disorders, such as BED, in these populations. Food security has been found to be a notable predictor of eating disorder behaviors. Low food security has been shown to increase the prevalence and frequency of binge eating. Researchers have been called on to reframe eating-related disorders to better fit low socioeconomic status populations and improve future investigations.

=== Worldwide prevalences ===
BED is not something only to be found in Western countries. Evidence of increasing eating disorder prevalence has been observed in "non-Western countries and among ethnic minorities". Though the research on binge eating disorders tends to be concentrated in North America, the disorder occurs across cultures. Increasing globalization has influenced the prevalence of eating disorders outside of the West. In the US, BED is present in 0.8% of male adults and 1.6% of female adults in a given year.

The prevalence of BED is lower in Nordic countries compared to Europe in a study that included Finland, Sweden, Norway, and Iceland. The point prevalence ranged from 0.4 to 1.5 percent and the lifetime prevalence ranged from 0.7 to 5.8 percent for BED in women.

In a study that included Argentina, Brazil, Chile, Colombia, Mexico, and Venezuela, the point prevalence for BED was 3.53 percent. Therefore, this particular study found that the prevalence for BED is higher in these Latin American countries compared to Western countries.

The prevalence of BED in Europe ranges from <1 to 4 percent.

=== Co-morbidities ===
BED often happens with diabetes, stroke, and heart disease.

People who experience OCD or bipolar disorder have a greater chance of dealing with BED.

Additionally, 30 to 40 percent of individuals seeking treatment for weight loss can be diagnosed with binge eating disorder.

=== Underreporting in men ===
Men often do not report a personal issue of BED. Underreporting could be a result of measurement bias due to how eating disorders are defined. The current definition for eating disorders focuses on thinness. However, eating disorders in men tend to center on muscularity and would therefore warrant a need for a different measurement definition. Overvaluation rates of body weight or shape in adolescent males are significantly lower than their female counterparts (4.9% and 24.2%, respectively). Little is known if this discrepancy is an indicator of later onset of body image distortion in males or a consequence of female-centric diagnostic frameworks for eating disorders.

The lack of representation of men in eating disorder research has been hindered by historical perceptions of eating disorders as a "female phenomenon". Researchers have been called on to address this gap by advancing methods of "identification, assessment, classification, and treatment" for eating disorders in a male-specific context, specifically in young men.

== Frequency ==
BED is the most common eating disorder, with 47% of people with eating disorders having BED, 3% of them have anorexia nervosa, and 12% of them have bulimia nervosa. Over 57% of people with BED are female and it often begins in the late teens or early 20s.

== History ==
The disorder was first described in 1959 by psychiatrist and researcher Albert Stunkard as "night eating syndrome" (NES). The term "binge eating" was coined to describe the same bingeing-type eating behavior but without the exclusive nocturnal component.

There is less research on BED than there is on anorexia or bulimia.

== See also ==
- Prader–Willi syndrome
