= Body image disturbance =

Altered perception of one's body image

- Specialty: Psychiatry, psychology
- Symptoms: Altered body self-perception, body uneasiness, body dissatisfaction, body-checking behavior
- Complications: Eating disorders
- Usual onset: Early adolescence
- Risk factors: Body dissatisfaction, childhood neglect, childhood abuse
- Diagnostic method: EDI-3, body uneasiness test, clinical diagnosis, Visual Size Estimation Task, 3D Morphing
- Differential diagnosis: Body dysmorphic disorder, obsessive–compulsive disorder
- Prevention: Positive body image, good self-esteem, healthy eating behaviors
- Treatment: Psychotherapy Psychiatric rehabilitation

Body image disturbance (BID) is a common symptom in patients with eating disorders and is characterized by an altered perception of one's own body.

The onset is mainly attributed to patients with anorexia nervosa who persistently tend to subjectively discern themselves as average or overweight despite adequate, clinical grounds for a classification of being considerably or severely underweight. The symptom is an altered perception of one's body and a severe state of bodily dissatisfaction characterizing the body image disturbance. It is included among the diagnostic criteria for anorexia nervosa in DSM-5 (criterion C).

The disturbance is associated with significant bodily dissatisfaction and is a source of severe distress, often persisting even after seeking treatment for an eating disorder, and is regarded as difficult to treat. Thus, effective body image interventions could improve the prognosis of patients with ED, as experts have suggested. However, there is no hard evidence that current treatments for body image disturbance effectively reduce eating disorder symptoms. Furthermore, pharmacotherapy is ineffective in reducing body misperception and it has been used to focus on correlated psychopathology (e.g., mood or anxiety disorders). However, to date, research and clinicians are developing new therapies such as virtual reality experiences, mirror exposure, or multisensory integration body techniques, which have shown some extent of efficacy.

== History ==
The scientific study of bodily experiences began at the end of the 19th century. German physiologist Hermann Munk was the first to suggest the existence of a cortical representation of the body, supported by his vivisection experiments on the parietal cortex of dogs. A few years later, Carl Wernicke hypothesized a cortical map capable of collecting and processing sensory inputs from every point of the body. In 1905 Bonnier introduced the term body schema, defining it as the mental representation of the body necessary for the brain to perceive objects near, far, or within the body itself.

Bonnier also described three different partial body pattern alterations, hyperschématie (French; 'an overestimation of body size'), hyposchématie ('an underestimation of body size'), and paraschématie ('a displacement of body parts including internal organs'). Head and Holmes in 1911 expanded the concept of a body schema, introducing the concepts of postural schema and surface schema. They described a patient who could locate the stimuli applied to her body but could not locate her hand in space. They also defined the difference between schema and image. The schema defined as an unconscious representation necessary for movement and localization in space, and the "image" as a conscious body perception.

Therefore, in the history of medicine, distortions in the perception of one's body have mainly occurred in patients with neurological damage or with amputated limbs and a consequence of phantom limb syndrome. In the psychiatric field, the first systematic descriptions of bodily altered perception are already present in Schneider's classification of symptoms of schizophrenia in 1959. The German-American psychiatrist Hilde Bruch was the first physician to describe body image disturbance in eating disorders accurately.

== Characteristics ==
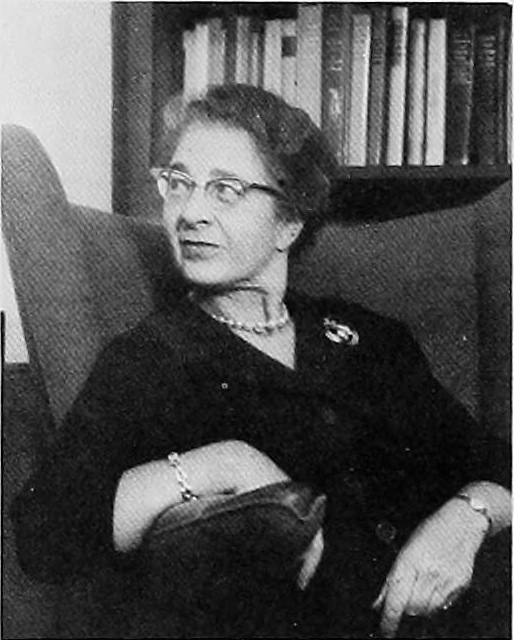
Hilde Bruch was the first to describe the body image disturbance in anorexia nervosa accurately. She has devoted a large part of her career to studying and treating eating disorders.

Hilde Bruch first identified and described body image disturbance in anorexia nervosa. In her article "Perceptual and Conceptual Disturbances in Anorexia Nervosa" she wrote:

What is pathognomic of anorexia is not the severity of the malnutrition per se—equally severe degrees are seen in other malnourished psychiatric patients—but rather the distortion of body image associated with it: the absence of concern about emaciation, even when advanced, and the vigor and stubbornness with which the often gruesome appearance is defended as normal and right, not too thin, and as the only possible security against the dreaded fate of becoming fat.

— Hilde Bruch, Perceptual and Conceptual Disturbances in Anorexia Nervosa, Psychosomatic Medicine, 1962

Body image disturbance is not specific to anorexia nervosa, as it is sometimes present in other eating disorders such as bulimia nervosa and binge eating disorder. Studies published in 2019 on Cortex have shown that it is possible to observe alterations in the perception of one's body in healthy subjects. A slightly altered perception of the body is a normal part of everyone's life and manifests itself more intensely in more vulnerable individuals (e.g., patients with eating disorders). Commonly, body image disturbance is confused with body dysmorphic disorder, an obsessive–compulsive-related disorder with which it shares some features.

Body image disturbance is a multifaceted construct including both perceptual and attitudinal issues. Some of the more common signs are:

- altered body size estimation and altered perception of the body and its shapes;
- mental images of one's body appearing distorted or overweight;
- frequently third-person mental view of one's body;
- negative body-related thoughts;
- frequent body-checking behaviors;
- frequent comparisons between one's own body and the bodies of others;
- emotions of anxiety, shame, and contempt for one's body.

Clinically speaking, a growing body of research suggests that body image disturbance plays a significant role in the onset, maintenance, and relapse of anorexia nervosa, as previously suggested by Bruch in 1962. However, despite increasing evidence, a review by Glashouwer in 2019 stated that the available empirical data are still insufficient and "provide no basis to answer the question whether body image disturbance is a (causal) risk factor for anorexia nervosa". As suggested by the author, this lack of evidence is partly related to terminology problems used in the body image field.

=== In binge eating disorder ===
Body image disorder is a characteristic symptom of anorexia nervosa and bulimia nervosa. In both of these disorders, an excessive focus on body shapes and sizes made the body image disturbance easier to identify, to describe, and study. Much less is known about the disorder in patients with binge eating disorder.

As early as 1993, Spitzer compared obese individuals with and without binge eating disorder (BED) and found that those with BED were more frequently concerned about body shape and weight. Additionally, binge eating disorder patients show more significant concerns about weight and body shape, more intense body dissatisfaction, and more frequent avoidance and body checking behaviors. On the other hand, few studies have investigated the altered body perception in patients with binge eating disorder and the results are conflicting. Some patients tend to overestimate their body shapes, in others, they do not. In some cases the perceptual disturbance manifests itself in a paradoxical way, with an underestimation of the real body shapes and sizes. This difference suggests different phenotypes in binge spectrum; hence, a perceptual disturbance can be considered an aggravation of the binge eating disorder, as claimed by Lewer and colleagues in 2017.

== Epidemiology ==
There are no reliable epidemiological data in the literature for body image disturbance.

There are numerous challenges with diagnosis, the most relevant of which is the unclear definition of body image disturbance within official diagnostic manuals such as the DSM and the ICD, which prevents its identification in the population. Further, there are challenges with diagnostic tools, both for recognition and screening. The altered perception of the body can only be measured through behavioral tasks delivered individually (See section below). It cannot be measured with questionnaires, or other tools typically used for broad-spectrum investigations.

As it is not always present in eating disorders, its prevalence is not comparable to that of anorexia nervosa, bulimia nervosa, and binge eating disorder, and cannot be inferred from them. A negative body image may also be present in other psychiatric conditions such as PTSD, major depression, and body dysmorphic disorder. Taken together this data suggests the possible presence of perceptual disturbances in other pathological conditions not directly related to eating disorders. Therefore, the presence of a body image disturbance in other psychiatric diseases remains speculation, not yet supported by sufficient literature data, as suggested by Scheffers.

== Definition ==
=== DSM-5 ===
Different labels are used in research and clinical settings to describe body image disturbance, generating terminological confusion. Among the most used terms are body image discrepancy, body image self-discrepancy, body image distortion, disturbed body image, disturbances in body estimations, body image disturbance, and negative body image. Sometimes, the term body dissatisfaction is also used to refer to body image disturbance indiscriminately. Moreover, the DSM-5 defines this symptom vaguely: "a disturbance in the way one's body weight or shape is experienced". The lack of a clear definition is problematic from both a clinical and basic research point of view.

=== Multidimensional ===
Despite the terminological problems, during the early 2000s numerous scholars agree that body image disturbance is a multidimensional symptom of various components associated with body image. Body image is a concept formed by the interaction of four body-related components: cognitive, affective, behavioral, and perceptual.

- Cognitive: thoughts and beliefs about one's body and its shape; a conscious mental representation of the body
- Affective: feelings and attitudes related to the body (e.g. bodily satisfaction/dissatisfaction).
- Behavioral: the actions that people perform to check on, modify, or hide their body parts.
- Perceptual: how the mind senses and perceives the body; it includes proprioceptive, interoceptive, tactile, and visual self-perception.

In people with body image disturbance all of these components are altered at the same time.

In 2021, Artoni et al proposed a clearer definition of body image disturbance as part of a study in Eating and Weight Disorders. The authors suggested using the term bodily dissatisfaction when there are alterations in either the affective, cognitive, or behavioral components of body image and strictly reserving the term body image disturbance only when all four components are altered, including perception. In short, they define body image disturbance as the presence of an altered perception of the shape and weight of one's body, which aggravates body dissatisfaction. The term is consistent with the DSM-5 description "a disturbance in the way weight and body shapes are experienced" and it is therefore "preferable to others".

== Components ==
=== Cognitive ===
Patients with body image disturbance exhibit an alteration in how the body's image is stored in their memory—the conscious representation of their bodies. This representation is from a third-person, perspective, more precisely an allocentric representation of the body. This representation is evoked in self-image tasks, such as comparing one's body with others or drawing one's body shapes. However, patients with anorexia nervosa and bulimia nervosa frequently perceive their body as larger than it is in reality.

Patients with anorexia nervosa have negative thoughts about their body, such as "I'm too fat," "I'm ugly," and other negative body-related thoughts. In some cases, however, the ideal internalized body is indicative of unhealthy thinness (e.g., a body without female shapes or one that communicates suffering). An unhealthy body shape could be a critical maintenance factor, generating more attention from family members, reducing the requests and expectations of others, and minimizing sexual attractiveness (especially in patients with sexual trauma).

=== Affective ===
Affective components of body image are the feelings and emotions experienced towards one's body. Body dissatisfaction is frequently present in those with body image disturbance, sometimes related to anxiety and shame when the body is exposed or gazed at in a mirror. In some cases, anger and feelings of aggression towards one's body are reported. Fear is associated with thoughts of getting fat.

Congruent with the self-objectification theory, people with body image disturbance frequently experience the body only as an object to be modified rather than as a subject to take care of.

=== Behavioral ===
The behavioral component of body image disturbance includes different body-checking behaviors such as repeatedly weighing during the day, spending significant time in front of the mirror or avoiding it, frequently taking selfies, checking parts of the body with hands (e.g. measuring the circumference of the wrists, arms, thighs, belly or hips). Other behaviors include avoiding situations in which the body is exposed (for example, when swimming), and wearing very loose and covering clothes. More generally, avoidance of bodily sensations, particularly the interoceptive ones, is reported.

=== Perceptual ===
In body image disturbance, several perceptual domains are altered. Visual perception is the most studied, whereby people often perceive their bodies as larger or smaller than they really are. One explanation for this phenomenon that is gaining support is that visual adaptation and attentional bias play a role. People who are more dissatisfied with their bodies tend to preferentially attend to more idealised, thinner bodies. More attention to thinner bodies results in visual adaptation, such that subsequently viewed bodies (including one's own) appear heavier than they really are.

Research has also found misperceptions in other sensory domains such as haptic, tactile, and affective-touch. Also, the body schema is overextended. Some research suggested that this is related to a general enlarged mental representation of body size. A 2017 study published in a companion journal to Nature highlighted how perceptual disturbance is present in those recovered from anorexia nervosa even without affective-cognitive body concerns. Finally, interoception, the sense of the current state of the body, is problematic in those with eating disorders.

== Onset ==
The age of onset for body image disturbance is often early adolescence, the age in which one's comparison to their peers becomes more significant and leads to a greater sensitivity towards criticism of, or teasing about, one's physical appearance. Furthermore, puberty leads to rapid changes in body size and shape that need to be integrated into one's body image. For this reason, adolescence is considered a critical age, with a greater vulnerability to internalizing ideals of thinness, which may ultimately lead to the development of body dissatisfaction, body image disturbance, or eating disorders. In a 2019 review, Sattler and colleagues analyzed eight on-topic studies. The authors found that most adolescents with anorexia nervosa and bulimia nervosa already had body-checking behaviors, negative body-related emotions and feelings, low body satisfaction, and an altered estimate of their body size compared to healthy controls. Unfortunately, exactly how one passes from initial dissatisfaction with one's body to actual perceptual disorder is still unknown despite its clinical importance. The etiopathogenesis is still unknown and the subject of hypotheses in the clinical and neuroscientific fields.

== Relationship to other concepts ==
=== Body dissatisfaction ===
Body dissatisfaction and body image disturbance are closely related. Personal, interpersonal, cultural, social, and ethnic variables largely influence bodily dissatisfaction, influencing the emergence of painful feelings towards one's body. In addition, social pressure is considered a risk factor for body dissatisfaction. For example, the frequent presence on media of thin female bodies determines, especially in young girls, a daily comparison between their bodies and models and actresses favoring bodily dissatisfaction; comparing an "ideal" and "real" body feed an intense dissatisfaction with one's body and increases the feeling of shame, disgust, and anxiety towards one's body and appearance.

Dissatisfaction with one's body involves only three of the four components of the body image. Those with bodily dissatisfaction can have negative thoughts about one's body (e.g., "I'm ugly" or "I'm too short"). In addition, they may have behaviors related to bodily dissatisfaction (e.g., going on a diet or resorting to cosmetic surgery) . They may also have negative feelings of dissatisfaction with their body and be ashamed of showing it in public. However, all these aspects are not enough to define it as a body image disturbance. In fact, there is no perceptual alteration of one's body. Thus, "body image disturbance" cannot be used interchangeably with "body dissatisfaction", but they are closely related.

=== Body dysmorphic disorder ===
Body image disturbance in anorexia and body dysmorphic disorder (BDD) are similar psychiatric conditions that both involve an altered perception of the body or parts of it but are not the same disorder. Body image disturbance is a symptom of anorexia nervosa (AN) and is present as criterion C in the DSM-5, and alters the perception of weight and shapes of the whole body. Patients with anorexia nervosa believe that they are overweight, perceive their body as being "fat" and misperceive their body's shape. Body dysmorphic disorder, meanwhile, is an obsessive–compulsive-related disorder characterized by disproportionate concern for minimal or absent individual bodily flaws, which cause personal distress and social impairment—patients with body dysmorphic disorder are concerned about physical details, mainly the face, skin, and nose. Thus, both anorexia nervosa and body dysmorphic disorder manifest significant disturbances in body image but are different and highly comorbid. For example, Grant et al reported that 39% of AN patients in their sample had a comorbid diagnosis of body dysmorphic disorder, with concerns unrelated to weight. Cerea et al reported that 26% of their AN sample had a probable BDD diagnosis with non-weight-related body concerns.

While a 2019 review by Phillipou et al in Psychiatry Research suggested that the two disorders could be taken together as "body image disturbances", plural, more in-depth studies are needed to confirm this new classification hypothesis.

==== Similarities ====
Previous studies found that both BDD and eating disorder groups were similar in body dissatisfaction, body checking, body concerns, and levels of perfectionism. Furthermore, both BDD and AN patients report higher intensities of negative emotions, lower intensities of positive emotions, lower self-esteem, and anxiety symptoms. Moreover, research find severe concerns about one's appearance, leading to a continuous confrontation with others' bodies in both diseases. In addition, body image disturbances and body dysmorphic disorder generally onset during adolescence. Finally, alterations in visual processes seems to be present in both disorders, with greater attention to detail, but with greater difficulty in perceiving stimuli holistically. Indeed, neurophysiology and neuroimaging research suggests similarities between BDD and AN patients in terms of abnormalities in visuospatial processing.

==== Differences ====
Despite many similarities, the two disorders also have significant differences. The first is gender distribution. Body image disturbance is much more present in females, unlike BDD, which has a much less unbalanced incidence. Furthermore, those with dysmorphophobia tend to have more significant inhibitions and avoidance of social activities than those with anorexia nervosa. Differences are self-evident when considering the focus of physical concerns and misperception in AN and BDD. BDD patients report concerns and misperception in specific body areas (mainly face, skin, and hair). In patients with AN, the altered perception could involve the arms, shoulders, thighs, abdomen, hips, and breasts, and concerns are about overall body shape and weight; thus leading to an alteration of the entire explicit (body image) and implicit (body schema) mental representation of the body. Furthermore, in anorexia nervosa, not only is visual perception of one's body altered, but both tactile and interoceptive perception are as well.

== Diagnosis ==
Body image disturbance is not yet clearly defined by official disease classifications. However, it appears in the DSM-5 under criterion C for anorexia nervosa and is vaguely described as "a disturbance in the way weight and body shapes are experienced". As a result, diagnosis is usually based on reported signs and symptoms; there are still no biological markers for body image disturbance. Numerous psychometric instruments to measure the cognitive, affective, and behavioral components of one's body image are used in clinical and research settings, helping in assessing the body image's attitudinal components. Recently, research developed other instruments to measure the perceptive component.

=== Attitudinal assessment tools ===
- The Eating Disorder Inventory 3 (EDI-3) represents an improvement of the earlier versions of the EDI, a self-report questionnaire widely used both in research and clinical settings. It consists of 91 questions, and items are rated on a six-point Likert scale (always, usually, sometimes, rarely, never), with higher scores representing more severe symptoms. Precisely, the BD subscale of EDI-3 measures bodily dissatisfaction.
- The Body Uneasiness Test (BUT) is a self-administered questionnaire. It explores several areas in clinical and non-clinical populations: weight phobia, body image-related avoidance behavior, compulsive self-monitoring, detachment and estrangement feelings toward one's own body. Besides, explore specific worries about particular body parts, shapes, or functions. Higher scores indicate significant body uneasiness.
- The Body Image Disturbance Questionnaire investigates different areas related to body image disturbance. For example, it evaluates the parts of the body an individual finds most problematic, the psychological effects of their worries about their body, and effects on their social life and eating behavior.
- The Body Shape Questionnaire is a 34-item self-assessment questionnaire designed to measure the degree of dissatisfaction with the weight and shape of one's body. It includes questions about the fear of weight gain and about whether one has the urge or desire to lose weight.
- The Body Checking Questionnaire measures the frequency of body control behaviors, such as measuring specific body areas, using mirrors to check or avoid body shape, wearing loose-fitting, covering clothing, or checking for bony prominence with one's hands. Higher scores indicate a higher frequency of body checking behaviors.

=== Perceptual assessment tools ===
- BID-CA (Test for Body Image Distortion in Children and Adolescents): Patients with a 180 cm rope simulate the circumference of the different parts of the body, including the hips, thighs, shoulder width and other parts of the body considered phobic. This estimate is compared to the actual patient size. The procedure is validated for children and adolescents but can also be used in adults.
- Visual Size Estimation Task (VSE): patients are placed standing in front of a wall at a distance of about one meter. They place two stickers on the wall that reflect the perceived dimensions of different body parts, such as the width of the shoulders, hips, or waistline. These values are then taken and compared with those measured directly on the patient.
- Tactile Estimation Task (TET): a standard gauge is used for measurement. During the measurement, patients estimate the distance between the two points of the gauge while it is placed on different parts of the body. Several measurements are made and the gauge is oriented in different directions (for example, at the height of the hips, it is placed both horizontally and vertically)
- 3D Morphing: Numerous 3D modeling computer programs allow directly modifying a human body model by increasing or decreasing its size. Patients modify the 3D avatar so that it represents their body image as closely as possible. The model values are then compared with the actual measurements of the patients.

== Multi-sensory perception ==
The perception of one's body is a multi-sensory process that integrates information deriving from different sensory cortices, including the visual, proprioceptive, tactile, interoceptive, and auditory-vestibular areas. All of these areas are involved in the perception of one's body. An important component is the premotor cortex (PMC) and the intraparietal sulcus. These two areas are active during illusory hand perception tasks in both hemispheres.

The somatosensory areas are also involved, in particular the primary somatosensory cortex (S1). An important area is the extrastriate body area located rostrocaudally in the occipital lobe and is specific to human bodies perception. Two other areas of considerable importance in the perception of the body are the insula and the anterior cingulate cortex. The insular cortex is fundamental in the direct perception and integration of bodily signals from different cortical areas and, despite being an area historically delegated to the sole function of perceiving the state of internal organs as proposed by Sherrington in 1911, research advances demonstrate the central role of the insula in several domains, including the recognition that one's body belongs to us. Namely the "body ownership".

== Brain imaging ==
fMRI studies examining brain responses in anorexia nervosa patients to paradigms that include body image tasks have found altered activation across different brain areas, including the prefrontal cortex, precuneus, parietal cortex, insula, amygdala, ventral striatum, extrastriate body area, and fusiform gyrus. However, as Janet Treasure commented, "the research [in the field] is fragmented, and the mechanism of how these areas map onto the functional networks described above needs further study ... the mechanism by which the extremes of body distortion are driven and [their] circuitry is not known yet."

== Prevention ==
The Body Project is an eating disorder prevention program within a dissonant-cognitive framework. The program provides a forum for high school girls and college-age women to confront unrealistic-looking ideals and develop a healthy body image and self-esteem. It has been repeatedly shown to effectively reduce body dissatisfaction, negative mood, unhealthy diet, and disordered eating.

== Treatments ==
=== Of cognition, affect, and behavior ===
Historically, research and clinicians have mainly focused on body image disturbance's cognitive, affective, and behavioral components. Consequently, treatments generally target symptoms such as body checking, dysfunctional beliefs, feelings, and emotions relating to the body. One of the best-known psychotherapies in the field is CBT-E. CBT-E is a cognitive-behavioral therapy that has been enhanced with particular strategies to address the psychopathology of eating disorders. These include reducing negative thoughts and worries about body weight and shape, reducing clinical perfectionism, and body-checking behavior. In 2020 a review has shown that CBT-E effectively reduces core symptoms in eating disorders, including concerns about the body. Despite this, the results of CBT-E are no better than other forms of treatment. A therapy of choice for eating disorders in adults has not yet been identified.

Additionally, two other noteworthy body image treatments are Thomas F. Cash's "Body Image Workbook" and BodyWise. The former is an 8-step group treatment within a classic cognitive-behavioral framework. The latter is a psychoeducational-based treatment improved with cognitive remediation techniques to promote awareness of body image difficulties and to reduce cognitive inflexibility and body dissatisfaction.

=== Of perception ===
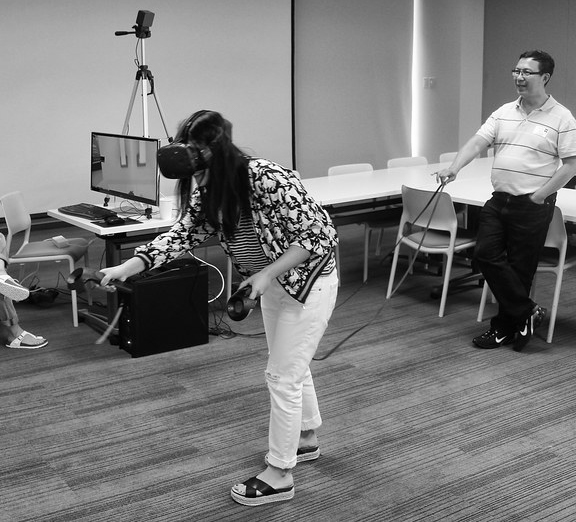
Common VR research setting

Compared to the classic cognitive-behavioral therapeutic paradigms, since the early 2000s, new treatments for body image disturbance have been developed focusing on the disorder's perceptual component. Mirror Exposure is a new cognitive-behavioral technique that aims to reduce experiential avoidance, reduce bodily dissatisfaction, and improve one's misperception of one's body. During the exposure therapy, patients are invited to observe themselves in front of a large full-length mirror. There are different types of mirror exposure: guided exposure; unguided exposure; exposure with mindfulness exercises; and cognitive dissonance-based mirror exposure. To date, few studies have investigated the effects of mirror exposure in patients with body image disturbance. In the International Journal of Eating Disorders, Key et al (2002) conducted a non-randomized trial in a clinical sample and compared a body image group therapy with or without mirror exposure. They found a significant improvement in body dissatisfaction only in the mirror exposure therapy group. Despite the positive evidence, in 2018, a review in Clinical Psychology Review suggests that Mirror Exposure has a low-to-medium effect in reducing body image disturbance and further studies are needed to improve it.

Another treatment for body image disturbance is Virtual Reality (VR) Body Swapping. VR-Body Swapping is a technique that allows generating a body illusion during a virtual reality experience. Specifically, after building a virtual avatar using 3D modeling software, it is possible to generate the illusion that the avatar's body is one's own body. The avatar is a 3D human body model that simulates the actual size of the patient and can be modified directly. Some studies have found that applying this technique to those with anorexia nervosa reduces their misperception of their bodies but provides, at the moment, only a short-term effect.

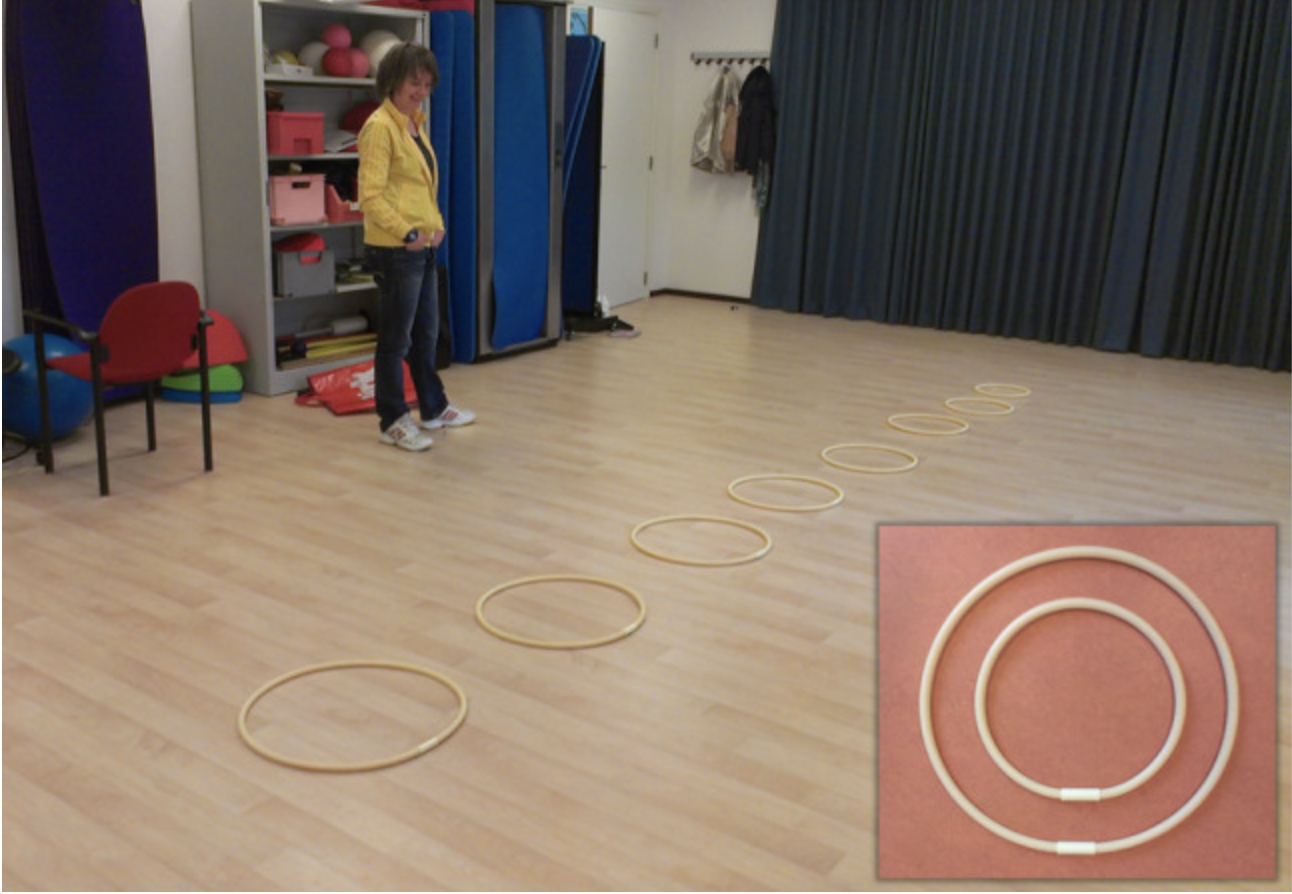
Hoop Training session. In the lower right corner: the perceived circumference of the hips is compared to the real one.

However, other treatments have also been developed to integrate tactile, proprioceptive, and interoceptive perception into one's overall body perception. Hoop Training is a short-term 8-week intervention (10 minutes per session) designed to become aware of and reduce body misperception. During the exercise, several flexible circles of different sizes are placed in front of the patient. First, the patients indicate which of the different circles best fits the circumference of their hips. Once indicated, patients are invited to enter the circle and, raising it, underestimating whether their estimate was accurate or not. The exercise takes place until the patient identifies the correct circumference for her hips. The circle chosen initially can be compared with the one that can coincide with the actual size of the patient. Hoop Training is meant to work on the components cognitive, affective, and perceptive of body image disturbance and the first efficacy data were published in 2019.

Another perceptive treatment is the Body Perception Treatment (BPT) whose first efficacy data were published in 2021. BPT is a specific group intervention for body image disturbance focused on tactile, proprioceptive, and interoceptive self-perceptions during a body-focused experience. During the exercise, patients lie down on their backs in the supine position with closed eyes. Then the therapist guide patients to selectively focus attention on the different body parts in contact with the floor. In order: feet, calves, thighs, back, shoulders, hands, arms, head and the body in its entirety. In addition, patients are invited to pay attention to skin temperature, heart beat and flow of breath. The treatment is consistent with the hypothesized role of interoception in developing body image disturbance by Badoud and Tsakiris in 2017.

Both Hoop Training and Body Perception Treatment showed effective results in pilot studies and were designed to work within a multisensory integration framework. However, they complement, not replace, current standard therapies for eating disorders. However, both are also novelty treatments, and the results have not been replicated in independent studies. Thus, their actual effectiveness will have to be confirmed/disconfirmed by future research. As of the end of 2021 they have not yet been replicated.
