= Developmental homeostasis =

Process of normal development despite circumstances

Developmental homeostasis is a process in which animals and plants develop more or less normally, despite defective genes and deficient environments. It is an organism's ability to overcome certain circumstances in order to develop normally. This can be a circumstance that interferes with either a physical or mental trait. Many species have a specific norm, where those who fit that norm prosper while those who don't, don't survive or find it difficult to thrive. It is important that the animal be able to interact with the other group members effectively. Animals must learn their species' norms while they're young to live a normal, successful life for that species.

Developmental homeostasis determines how a species adapts to live a normal life. Therefore, it has been the focus of many experiments. These experiments are geared and designed to test the threshold for certain species to overcome and prosper despite certain circumstances.

Due to the fact that survival of the species is based on the ability to interact with their own kind in a normal manner, these experiments—which usually interfere with that—walk a fine line for animal rights and what is acceptable. One experiment that researches mental development homeostasis used rhesus monkeys. These experiments showed how young monkeys need physical contact with other monkeys to learn social behaviors and interact with each other effectively. One way physical developmental homeostasis was tested was in the facial symmetry experiment where people were asked to rate which of the faces they saw as better looking. This experiment resulted in the pictures with more symmetrical faces being called better looking. This is not just found in humans but other experiments such as the brush-legged wolf spider and the barn swallow birds. Favored traits give the bearer an advantage in attracting high quality mates.

In species that value developmental homeostasis, both physically and mentally, the ability of one to adapt to social norms seems to increase the likelihood of having a reproductive advantage at being able to attract mates and leave offspring.

== Developmental homeostasis: isolation of monkeys ==
Developmental homeostasis attributes to the way many animals develop. This contains the way they develop normally or abnormally despite faulty genes and an insufficient environment. This property of development reduces the variation around a mean value for a phenotype, and reflects the ability of developmental processes to suppress some outcomes in order to generate an adaptive phenotype more reliably.

=== Effects of social isolation in rhesus monkeys ===
The effects of developmental homeostasis were demonstrated in an experiment conducted in 1966 by Margaret and Harry Harlow. They wanted to test what the consequences of infant rhesus monkeys would be from being separated from their mothers and having little interaction with other monkeys. First, they were separated from their mothers for six to twelve hours after birth and placed with a human made mechanical substitute in which they called the "surrogate mother." These surrogates were made either of a wire cylinder structure or a terry cloth structure and were placed with the babies in a cage. The terry cloth structure was also placed with a nursing bottle. The monkeys preferred and clung to the cloth surrogate mother. In a short period of time the monkeys took on side effects of weight loss and abnormal physical development. Once the monkeys reached an age where they could eat solid foods, they were separated from their cloth mothers for three days. When they were reunited with their mothers, they clung to them and did not wander off. Young rhesus monkeys in their natural habitat normally explore and venture off. Harlow concluded from this that the need for contact comfort was stronger than the need to explore. Being isolated from social interaction also caused negative outcomes later in their life. The surrogate-raised monkeys exhibited depression and aggressive behavior as they would clutch to themselves, rock constantly back and forth, and avoid interaction with others. Not only affecting their social behavior, it also impacted their sexual interacting. The monkeys underwent little if any sexual posturing or reproduction in their lifetime.

To test how much social experience is necessary or needed in normal development, the Harlows performed another experiment where they isolated young rhesus monkeys by limiting the interaction time with other monkeys. They gave them fifteen minutes a day with three other monkeys to interact. In the beginning, the monkeys would attach to each other and begin to play. Normal behavior of these monkeys in their natural habitat is that after the age of one month, they play with other monkeys of their own species and by six months are constantly interacting in groups. Results showed that over time, the monkeys developed relatively normal behavior and that limiting their social interaction as babies did not affect them interacting sexually and socially. They also did not exhibit any abnormal aggression or depression when socializing with other monkeys.

In 1960, Harry Harlow began studying partial and total isolation of infant monkeys by raising them in cages. Partial isolation involved raising monkeys in bare wire cages that allowed them to see, smell, and hear other monkeys, but did not give them the opportunity for physical contact. Total social isolation involved rearing monkeys in isolation chambers that took away any and all contact with other monkeys. The results showed that when the monkeys were placed in partial isolation they displayed various abnormal behaviors such as blank staring, circling in their cages numerous times, and self-mutilation. The cages were placed in several locations. A few of the monkeys remained being tested in solitary confinement for fifteen years.

In the total isolation experiments the baby monkeys were left alone for three, six, twelve, or twenty-four months. The experiments resulted in the monkeys being severely psychologically disturbed and abnormally developed. When first removed from isolation, they usually went into emotional shock by clutching to themselves and rocking multiple times. One of six monkeys isolated for three months refused to eat after release and died five days later. The longer the time in isolation, the more detrimental it was for the monkeys to act socially when placed with other monkeys. Harlow pointed out that no monkey had actually died during isolation. Harlow tried to reintegrate the monkeys who had been isolated for six months by placing them with monkeys who had been reared normally. He stated that it produced “severe deficits in virtually every aspect of social behavior” and that it “achieved only limited recovery of simple social responses.”

== Developmental homeostasis in symmetry and asymmetry ==
Developmental homeostasis plays a role in the development of symmetrical and asymmetrical bodies. This effect in species shows that individuals in species who have symmetrical features are more likely to obtain a mate over one who has asymmetrical features.

=== Symmetry in facial features ===
The symmetry in the facial features of humans could be found as appealing to men and women. This could be due to the ability to find prospective mates in responding positively to either body or facial symmetry. This could be because attributes announce the individual's capacity to overcome challenges to normal development. The human preference for symmetry can be explained by humans looking at mate choice, mainly because symmetry is a reliable indicator in the genetic quality mates look for. The cognitive mechanisms and adaptive significance of facial attractiveness have been an interest of psychologists. Men and women find traits such as averageness, symmetry, and masculinity (in males) or femininity (in females) in faces attractive. It is noted that humans find symmetrical faces more attractive than asymmetrical faces. Disruptions to development caused by mutations or by an inability to secure critical material resources early in life could generate asymmetries in appearance. If body asymmetry reflects sub-optimal development of the brain or other important organs, a preference for symmetrical traits could enable the selective individual to acquire a partner with "good genes" to transfer to their offspring. Disruptions to development could be caused by stress, illness, or genetic factors.

=== Symmetry vs. asymmetry ===
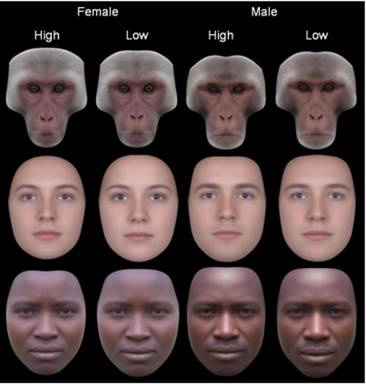
Symmetry of female and male faces. Those with high symmetry appear more attractive than low.

In 1998 a study of facial symmetry and beauty was experimented on by Gillian Rhodes called "Facial symmetry and the perception of beauty". In the experiment, images of human faces were digitally manipulated to show various amounts of symmetry. People were asked to rate the faces, and found that the faces with the most symmetry were the most attractive.

=== Reproductive advantages ===
Developmental homeostasis is present not only in humans, but in animals as well. The choosing of symmetrical features over asymmetrical features have been observed in birds, lizards, Araneae, and even insects. For example, barn swallow females have been reported to prefer males whose long outer feathers are the same length on each side. Symmetrical males gain a reproductive advantage because of the female mate choice.

Another example is the behavior exhibited in the damselfly Lestes viridis, where males with more symmetrical hindwings were mated with more than their unmated rivals with asymmetrical hindwings. These examples show that individuals with high quality features are able to reproduce their large and symmetrical traits, while individuals who have lower quality features suffer costs to produce their asymmetrical traits.

One species that chooses their mates based on body symmetry is the brush-legged wolf spider. Males who have larger tufts on one leg than the other (asymmetrical) tend to be smaller and have poorer fitness than the males who have symmetrical tufts. During courtship, the males wave their hair foreleg tufts, and symmetrical males are chosen over asymmetrical males by the females.
