= Guido Benjamin Pardo-Roques =

Israeli businessman

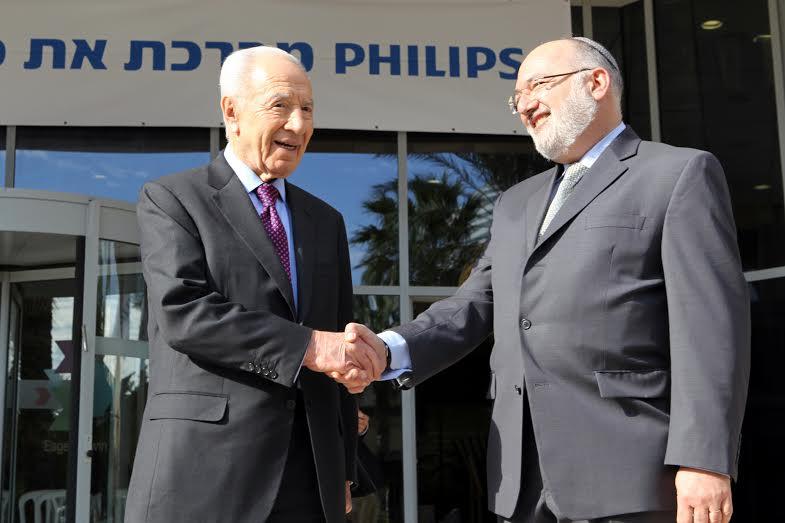
Guido Pardo-Roques, next to Shimon Peres, former President of the State of Israel

Guido Pardo-Roques (Hebrew: גידו פרדו-רוקס; born 31 July 1956) is an Israeli businessman. He is the president and CEO of Philips Israel and CEO of Philips Medical System Technologies which constitutes the Israel Commercial and Industrial branches of the multinational corporation Royal Philips Electronics.

== Biography ==
Guido Pardo-Roques was born in Milan, Italy in 1956. The Pardo-Roques family comes from a Jewish Portuguese ancient ancestry with an extended history in Spain and Portugal.

The family was expelled from Spain in 1492 and migrated to Pisa, Italy, in 1586.

In 1975, Pardo-Roques made aliyah (immigration to Israel). In 1980 he completed his bachelor's degree and in 1986, his Master of Science's degree in Electrical Engineering at the Technion (Israel Institute of Technology). In 2006, Pardo-Roques completed his M.B.A at the University of Haifa.

Pardo-Roques is married to Ketty and has three children.

== Business career ==
In 1980, Guido Pardo-Roques started his career at Elscint, at that time – a young medical company located in Haifa, which represented one of the symbols of Science and technology in Israel at the time. In 1988, he was asked to lead the development of a Spiral computed tomography scanner that will exceed the performances of any other CT scanner available in the market, and which will feature the ability to obtain two body images for each single rotation in. This unique feature, which will be later named Multi-Slice Technology, allows to reduce the dose of radiation exposure, to obtain double spatial resolution, to substantially reduce by half the imaging time and to perform Computed tomography of the heart, cardiac imaging. Hundreds of man-years were invested on the venture between the years 1988–1992. Technological agreements were signed between the company and academic institutions as well as worldwide industrial partners, within the framework of one of the largest multidisciplinary civilian projects at that time. Hundreds of these scanners were supplied to the most prestigious medical institutions across the world – this could be considered as the Israeli Medical Device Ecosystem "Big Bang", part of Israeli Start-Up Nation. Guido Pardo-Roques is the "father" of Multi-Slice Computed Tomography (MSCT). He is Chairman of the Medical Equipment Forum, board member of IAESI, Israel Association of Electronics and Software Industries, board member of IATI, Israel Advanced Technology Industries, member of the Technion Board of Governors.

Pardo-Roques was Project Manager of the CT Twin, the world first Multi-Slice CT scanner launched by Elscint in 1992, for which he was awarded the Rothschild prize for Innovation in 1996. In 1992–2006, he assumed the role of Head of CT R&D for Elscint, Picker and Philips. In 2007, he was appointed CEO of Philips Medical Systems Technologies. In 2012, Pardo-Roques became the president and CEO of Philips Israel.

In 2014, Pardo Roques contributed to the creation of a Healthcare Technological Incubator under the auspices of the Israel Chief Scientist, in the Israel Ministry of Economy with the participation of Philips and Teva (as part of Sanara Ventures investment platform).

== Award and recognition ==
In 1996, Pardo-Roques and his development team were awarded the Rothschild Prize for Innovation, the prize was handed by Ezer Weizman, former President of the State of Israel.

1996 – Rothschild prize for innovation

== See also ==
- Science and technology in Israel
- Economy of Israel
