= Body image (neuroscience) =

Conscious mental representation of one's body

Body image is a complex construct, often used in the clinical context of describing a patient's cognitive perception of their own body. The medical concept began with the work of the Austrian neuropsychiatrist and psychoanalyst Paul Schilder, described in his book The Image and Appearance of the Human Body first published in 1935. The term "body image" was officially introduced by Schilder himself and his widely used definition is: "body image is the picture of our own body we form in our mind, that is to say the way in which the body appears to ourselves". In research with the term "body image" we currently refer to a conscious mental representation of one's own body, which involves affects, attitudes, perceptual components and cognition. On the contrary, the term "body schema" was initially used to describe an unconscious body mental representation fundamental for action. Keizer and colleagues (2013) suggest the following definition: "[body schema is] an unconscious, sensorimotor, representation of the body that is invoked in action". In light of recent scientific developments regarding the multisensory integration of body sensations, the distinction between body image and body schema appears simplistic and probably no longer useful for scientific research and clinical purposes.

== Harms ==
Engaging in social comparisons, particularly upward comparisons to individuals perceived as superior, can negatively affect self-evaluations and body image. Research indicates that exposure to idealized media images, such as models embodying cultural beauty standards, often leads to unfavorable body-image outcomes. Specifically for women, who are more likely to engage in upward appearance comparisons. Individual differences play a crucial role in which appearance comparison tendencies occur. Identifying modifiable risk factors linked to appearance comparisons is crucial for reducing their frequency and preventing body dissatisfaction. The Identity Disruption Model suggests that early adverse experiences, such as abuse or neglect, can disrupt identity development, leading to low self-concept clarity and an increased tendency to compare oneself to others.

== Clinical significance ==
In the clinical setting, body image disturbances are relatively frequent and involve both psychiatric and neurological disorders. Disturbances in the perception of one's body are present in psychiatric disorders such as:

- anorexia nervosa
- bulimia nervosa
- binge eating disorder
- psychotic spectrum disorders
- body dysmorphic disorder
- body integrity dysphoria (not included in DSM-5)

Body image disorders are common in eating disorders and are referred to as "body image disturbance".

=== Anorexia nervosa ===
There are three aspects pertaining to body image distortion in those with Anorexia nervosa. The first is Perception; this refers to the way in which someone views their own body. This is where the EBA and FBA come into play. Both the Extrastriate Body Area (EBA) and the Fusiform Body Area (FBA) in the brain are involved in how we perceive our own bodies. Those with Anorexia nervosa present an impaired functioning in these two brain regions which accounts for their inability to correctly describe their body. The second aspect is Affect; how satisfied or dissatisfied one is with their body. The third and final component is Cognition which alludes to what someone thinks about their own body and how they mentally picture themselves. Both the Affect and Cognition components use the insula in the brain; it creates our sense of "self" and self-awareness. This means that the insula plays a role in how we feel (Affect) and think (Cognition) about ourselves.

Furthermore, The Allocentric Lock Theory states that those with eating disorders, such as Anorexia nervosa, are incapable of retaining new and updated views on their own bodies, therefore are unable to precisely report on their current body.

=== Bulimia nervosa ===
Bulimia nervosa is a form of an eating disorder where one binge eats, and then forces themself to throw up in order to not gain weight. It can be caused by many things, such as stress, pressure, genetics, low self-esteem, obesity, and more. It is difficult to get diagnosed with as people tend to keep it to themselves, additionally, it is more common to get diagnosed with anorexia nervosa, so bulimia nervosa is often overlooked.

=== Binge eating disorder ===
Binge eating disorder is a very serious form of eating disorder. Individuals with binge eating disorder often get the feeling of not being able to stop eating and eating much larger portions of food. Often after these binges, people with BED feel the need to cut back on their eating, but often this just results in more of the feeling to need to binge in the future. It can be caused by a number of things and is a lot of the time caused by a mix of things such as psychological things, environmental things, or biological things.

=== Psychotic spectrum disorders ===
Psychotic spectrum disorder is a group of disorders that all have to do with psychosis. People with psychotic spectrum disorders often have trouble deciphering their thought which can lead to them being unable to tell what is real and what is fake. It is hard to define because each person who experiences it experiences it differently. There are many different types such as schizophrenia, schizophreniform disorder, delusional disorder, and many more. It is unknown for sure what causes psychotic spectrum disorders, but it is thought to be most likely a combination of genetics, brain development, traumas, and/or illnesses.

=== Body dysmorphia disorder ===
Body dysmorphic disorder is a mental disorder in which a person hyper focuses on any possible flaws or defects that they see in themselves that in most cases aren't seen by others. It causes people that have it to care more and focus on body image and appearance. There's no known for sure cause of body dysmorphia, but like many other illnesses, it is most likely caused by a combination of things such as family history, negative experiences, and abnormal brain functions.

=== Body integrity disorder ===
Body integrity dysphoria is a mental disorder in which a person gets the feeling that a certain part of their body no longer belongs on their body. People with this disorder know that the part is useful and healthy, but don't believe that they should be able to use it. It often causes people to try and get amputations or attempt to amputate themselves. There's no known cause of body integrity disorder, but it is thought to have to do with issues regarding the structure of the brain because multiple parts of the brain are involved in body perception.

=== Measurements ===
Attempts by researchers to measure variances in body image include the FAI index, developed in a 2014 study (Zaccagni 2014). The FAI (feel-status minus actual-status inconsistency) index is used to assess someone's weight perception. FAI scores range from -3 to +3: Negative FAI values mean weight status underestimation, positive FAI values mean weight status overestimation and a FAI score of 0 means a realistic perception of one's weight status. The study found that women tend to have positive FAI values (overestimating their weight) while men had negative FAI values (underestimating their weight). Further studies have used the FAI index to study body image among natives and immigrants in Italy and North Africa.

Another study (Zaccagni 2020) developed a refined version of the FAI index, called the FAI^{FAT} index. This index (feel-fat-status minus actual-fat-status inconsistency) was meant to address possible fat status perception inconsistencies by bioelectrical impedance analysis (BIA).

== See also ==
- Body schema
- Gender dysphoria
- Mirror box
- Rubber hand illusion
- Body image—social concept
