= Emaciation =

- Pronunciation: /ɪˌmeɪʃiːˈeɪʃən/, /ɪˌmeɪsiːˈeɪʃən/
- Symptoms: thin limbs, pronounced and protruding bones, sunken eyes, dry skin, thinning hair, a bloated stomach, dry or coated tongue, halitosis, hyponatremia, hypokalemia, anemia, improper function of lymph and the lymphatic system, pleurisy, and edema
- Causes: Malnutrition, starvation, anorexia nervosa

Emaciation is defined as the state of extreme thinness from absence of body fat and muscle wasting usually resulting from malnutrition.

== Characteristics ==
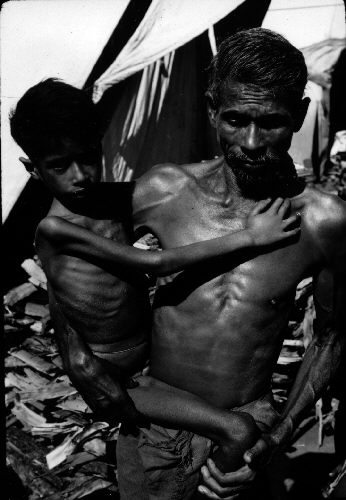
Photo from 1972 of an emaciated child and a man in India with marasmus

Emaciation manifests physically as thin limbs, pronounced and protruding bones, sunken eyes, dry skin, thinning hair, a bloated stomach, and a dry or coated tongue in humans. Emaciation is often accompanied by halitosis, hyponatremia, hypokalemia, anemia, improper function of lymph and the lymphatic system, and pleurisy and edema.

== Causes ==
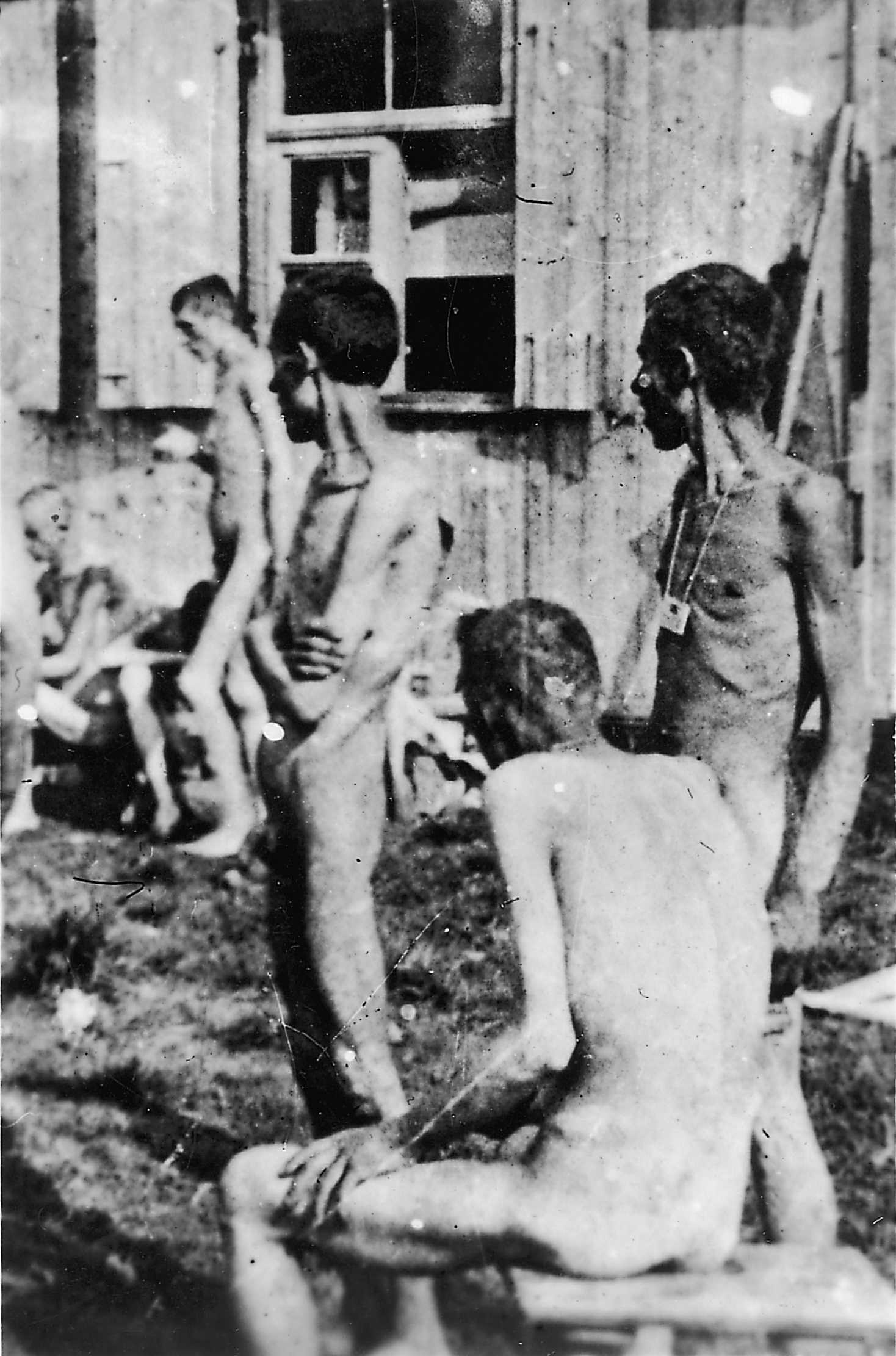
Buchenwald inmates, 16 April 1945, when the camp was liberated

Emaciation is widespread in least developed countries and was a major cause of death in Nazi concentration camps during World War II.

Emaciation can be caused by undernutrition, malaria and cholera, tuberculosis and other infectious diseases with prolonged fever, parasitic infections, many forms of cancer and their treatments, lead poisoning, and eating disorders like anorexia nervosa.

== Controversies ==
A recent upturn of celebrities appearing emaciated has ignited a conversation around "modern emaciation".

Modern emaciation can be defined as: a cultural phenomenon in which extreme thinness is framed as desirable, healthy, disciplined, or aspirational through celebrity culture, social media, fashion, and wellness narratives, potentially obscuring food insecurity, malnutrition, and eating-disorder harms.

Media-driven aesthetics, particularly in the fashion and celebrity industries, have elevated extremely thin body types. Emaciated individuals (particularly celebrities) in modern times are often utilized under thinspiration ideology.

While an "emaciated-look" was extremely prevalent in the 1990's, emaciation among individuals with prominent status has seen a resurgence in the most-recent years; largely due to something dubbed the "Ozempic Epidemic", and otherwise due to societal pressures regarding food scarcity, as well as intentional disordered eating.

Recent analyses, including 2025 critiques, note the proliferation of emaciated physiques in influencer culture, sometimes amplified by weight-loss drugs like Ozempic. This creates social pressures and can exacerbate eating disorders among impressionable populations.

== Other animals ==
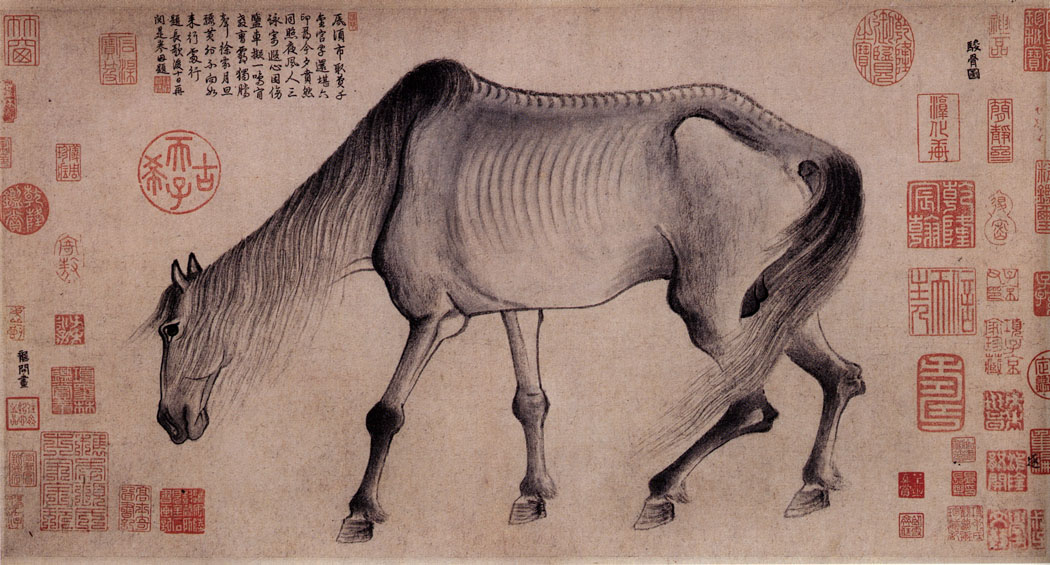
Illustration of an emaciated horse, by Chinese artist Gong Kai

A lack of resources in the habitat, disease, or neglect and cruelty from humans in captivity can result in emaciation in animals. In the rehabilitation of emaciated animals, the specific dietary needs of each animal have to be considered to avoid causing harm.

== See also ==
- Cachexia
- Anorexia
- Underweight
- Malnutrition
- Undernutrition in children
