= Thinspiration =

Anorexia promotion technique

Thinspiration, also known as thinspo, is recognized as photographic content of people (often but not always women) with (often extremely) thin body types, promoting unhealthy eating habits and disorders. Thinspiration blends the words "thin" and "inspiration" as to give motivation to people with eating disorders or people who want to be thin to continue to deprive themselves of food.

== Evolution ==
Thinspiration images were normally shared online in the early 2000s and 2010s on social media websites and forums, specifically in Pro-Ana groups, but not exclusively. Pro-Ana groups are found on WhatsApp group chats, Reddit, and Twitter. These groups promote disordered eating, specifically anorexia, by sharing pictures of their thin bodies and small meal portions, along with tips on how to remain thin. The "Ana" represents "anorexia", while "Pro" represents the reinforcement of disordered eating.

=== Tumblr ===
Tumblr is a blogging website that allowed users to create and repost images, videos, blog posts, forums, and discussions. It was especially popular between 2011 and 2015. Users would upload pictures of themselves, other existing images, or of celebrities that were thin to their blog to idealize this body type. While some people in the images may be naturally thin, some may be suffering from an eating disorder.

=== TikTok ===
Certain tags related to thinspiration were banned from other social media websites to avoid the promotion of eating disorders. Regardless, thinspiration content evolved onto other social media platforms through different formats that many people could not recognize immediately. TikTok, a short form video-sharing social media app, has fallen into the thinspiration loophole with many influencers adhering to the trend, consciously or not.

Thinspiration is often disguised as health and fitness content such as "fitspiration," weight loss journeys, body checking, "clean" eating, and detoxing. Many researchers and online critics claim such content replicates thinspiration and pro-ana material, thereby posing a risk to audiences who are easily influenced (ie: adolescent girls and young women). One such influencer, Liv Schmidt, has been banned from TikTok for a brief period because of her content.

== Idealization of thin body types ==
According to a study conducted by Madison R. Blackburn and Rachel C. Hogg in the United States of America using a sample of 273 women between the ages of 18 and 28 concluded watching only 7 minutes of TikTok content about women's body weight, including "neutral" content with women of a thin build but not discussing body weight, felt a decrease in their body image. This type of content promotes diet culture, and eating disorders. It is viewed as controversial because it affects the self esteem of young women and it is a variation of thinspiration because it can influence consumers to go to drastic measures to attain that body type, possibly in a quick and unhealthy manner.

There has been a resurgence and glamorization of the "Tumblr 2014 aesthetic". This aesthetic can be described as having a dark, grunge-like fashion sense, blue or purple hair colour, and enjoying indie music. This style was the trend during this period and any person who carried this style was considered "cool." Alongside this, a thin body type came with the style. Thinspiration has been popular on Tumblr in 2014. As of 2021, the aesthetic of 2014 Tumblr has been spreading on TikTok.
