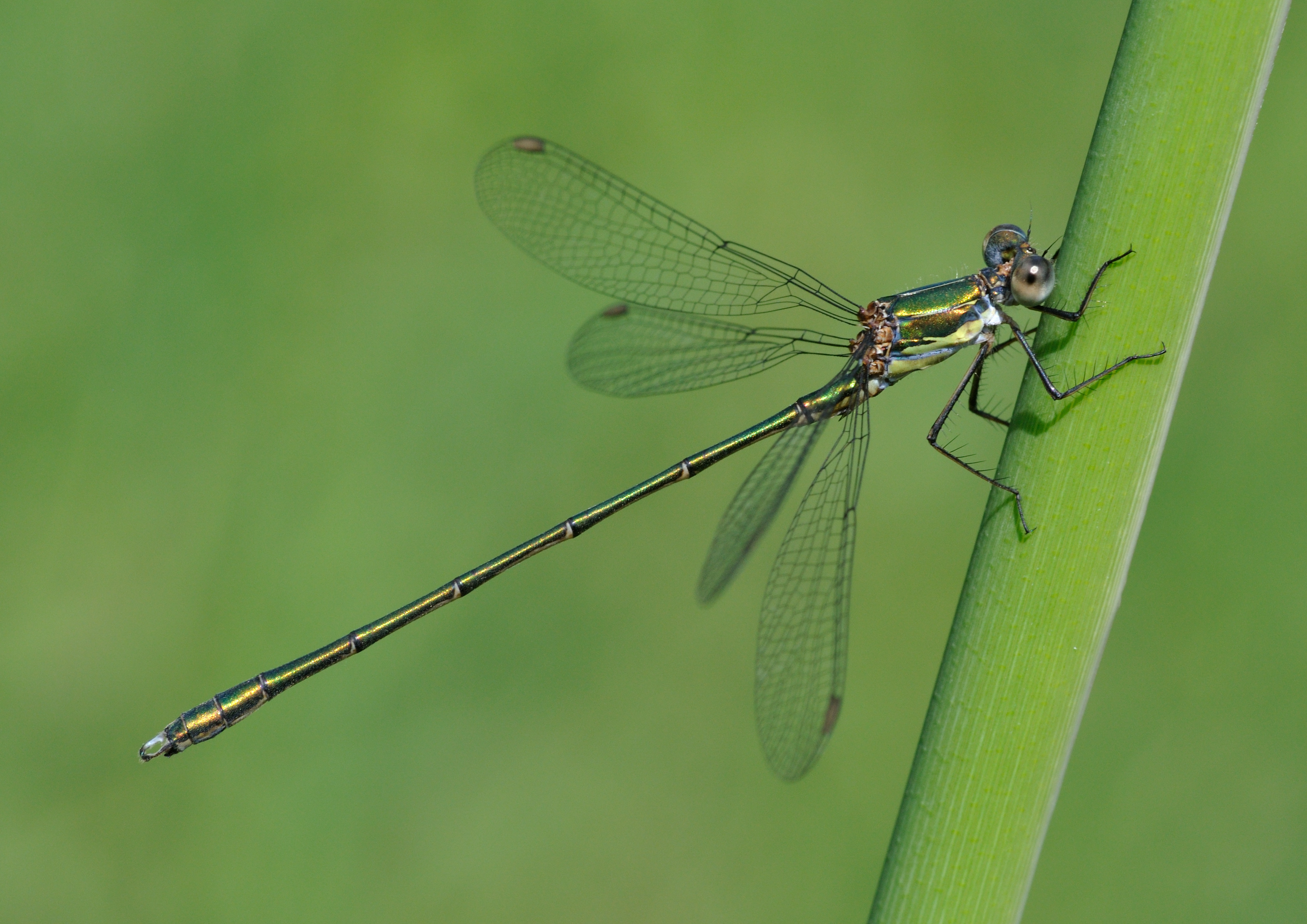
- C. viridis

Scientific classification
- Kingdom: Animalia
- Phylum: Arthropoda
- Class: Insecta
- Order: Odonata
- Suborder: Zygoptera
- Family: Lestidae
- Genus: Chalcolestes; Kennedy, 1920

= Chalcolestes =

Chalcolestes Temporal range: Late Eocene to present

Genus of damselflies

Chalcolestes is a small genus of damselfly in the family Lestidae. They are commonly known as willow spreadwings. They are similar to the spreadwings of the genus Lestes.

The name Chalcolestes comes from Greek: χαλχοσ copper and ληστησ predator.

== Species ==
The genus contains only two species:

| Male | Female | Scientific name | Common name | Distribution |
|---|---|---|---|---|
| | | Chalcolestes parvidens (Artobolevsky, 1929) | Eastern Willow Spreadwing | eastern Mediterranean; on Cyprus, Corsica, Crete and Sicily |
| | | Chalcolestes viridis (Vander Linden, 1825) | Willow Emerald Damselfly, Western Willow Spreadwing | Corsica, Sicily, Mallorca, Menorca and Ibiza, in the Maghreb in North Africa, Turkey and the Middle East |

A single fossil species, †Chalcolestes tibetensis Xia et al., 2022 is known from the Late Eocene of Tibet.
