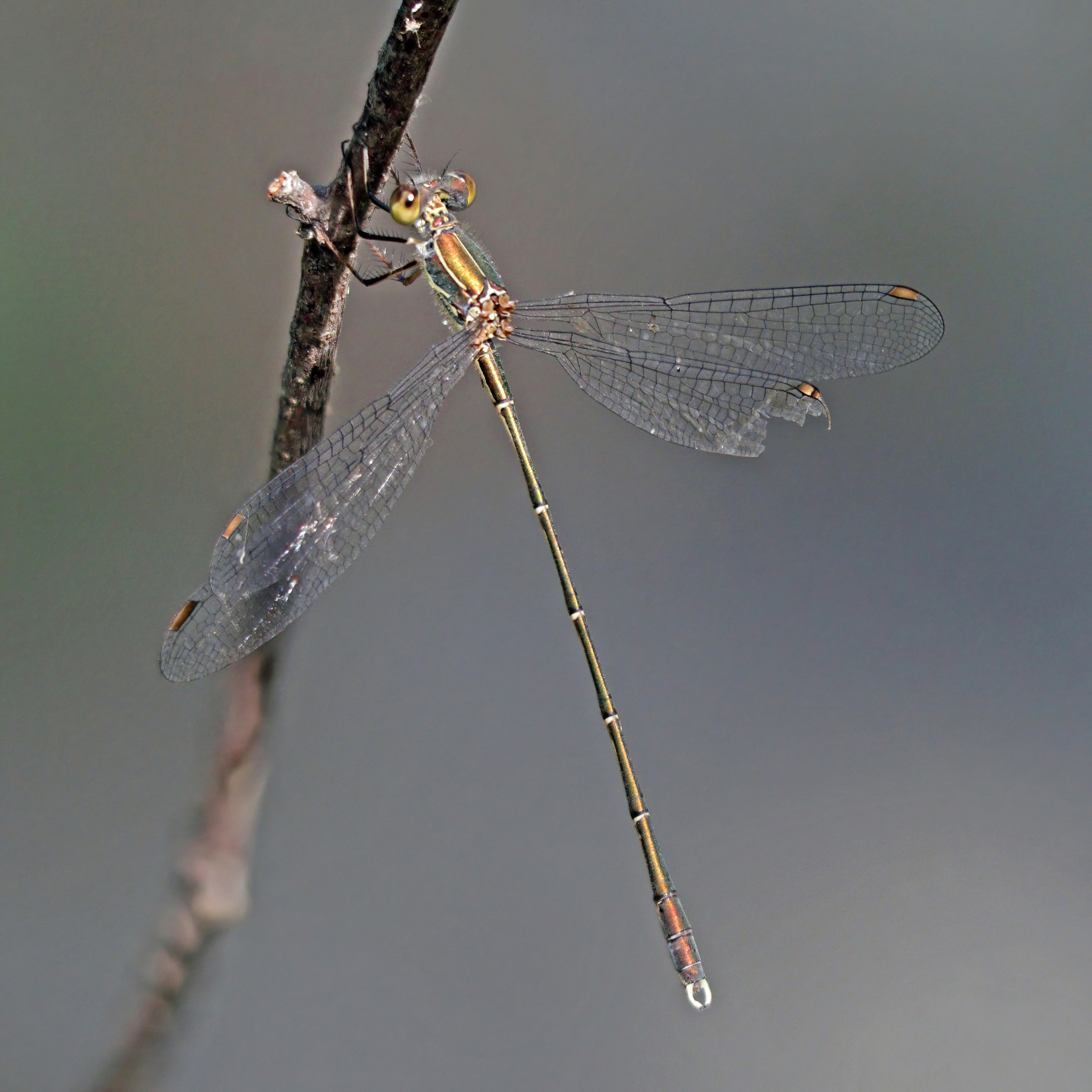
- Male
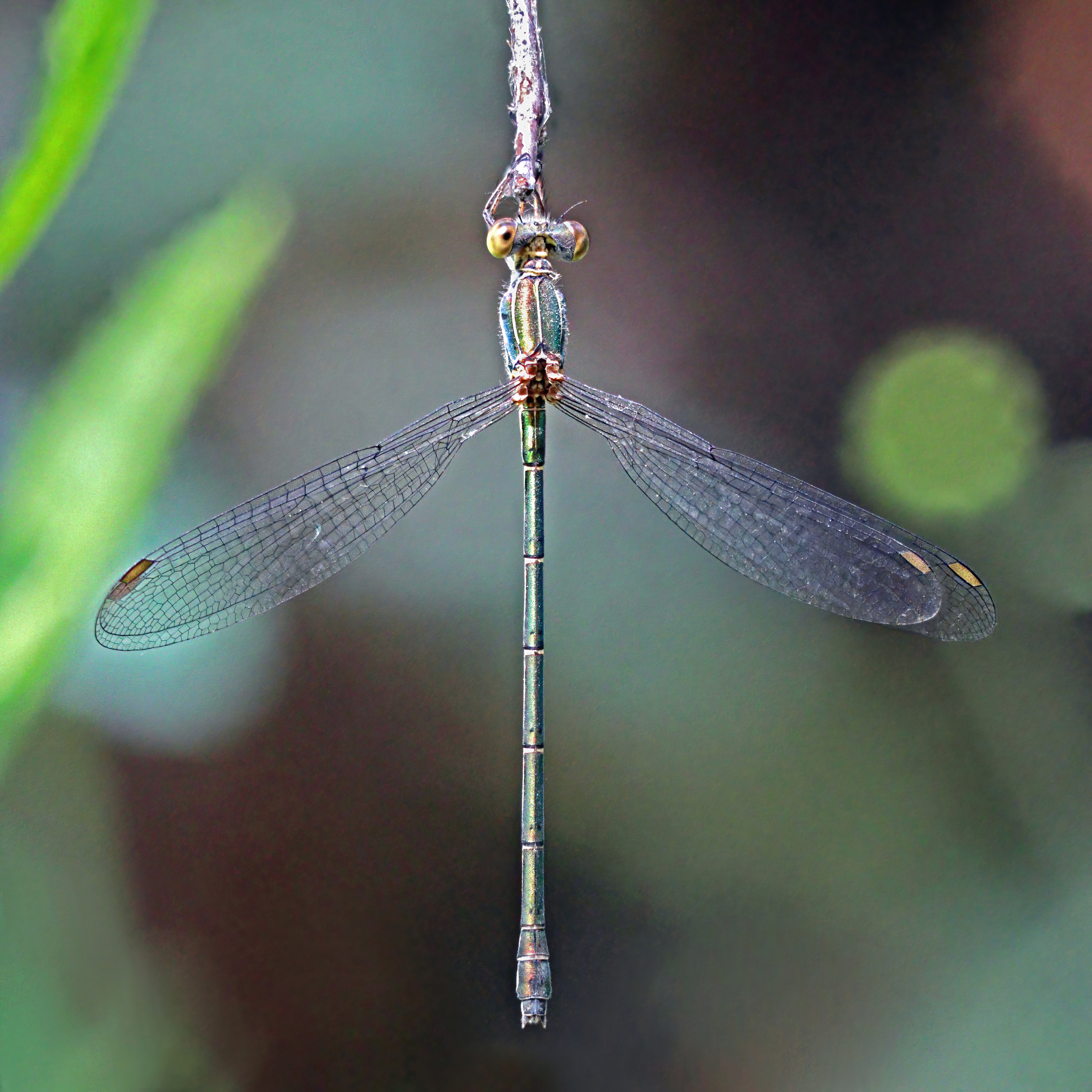
- Female both in Cyprus

Conservation status
- Least Concern (IUCN 3.1)

Scientific classification
- Kingdom: Animalia
- Phylum: Arthropoda
- Class: Insecta
- Order: Odonata
- Suborder: Zygoptera
- Family: Lestidae
- Genus: Chalcolestes
- Species: C. parvidens

Binomial name
- Chalcolestes parvidens (Artobelevski, 1929)

Synonyms
- Lestes parvidens Artobelevski 1929

= Chalcolestes parvidens =

Species of damselfly

Chalcolestes parvidens, formerly Lestes parvidens, is a damselfly of the family Lestidae. It has a metallic green body and at rest it holds its wings away from its body. Its common name in English is the eastern willow spreadwing.

== Taxonomy ==
The genus Chalcolestes is separated from Lestes because of differences in their larvae. C. parvidens is closely related to C. viridis and used to be considered a subspecies of C. viridis, however there are small morphological differences between the two species both as adults and larvae and analysis of proteins from the two species, by electrophoresis, also supports their separation into two species, but they are hard to tell apart in the field.

== Distribution and habitat ==
Chalcolestes parvidens is found in eastern and central Europe, in Croatia, Bulgaria, Greece, Italy, Syria, Jordan, Israel and Turkey. It is found on islands in the eastern Mediterranean; on Cyprus, Corsica, Crete and Sicily. In Italy and the Balkans both C. parvidens and C. viridis occur together. It is only in the last 20 years that odonaterists have been separating C. parvidens from C. viridis so some of the older records for C. viridis will probably be for C. parvidens.

== Identification ==
In the field it is not possible to reliably distinguish C. viridis from C. parvidens. Both species are mainly metallic green, like the Lestes damselflies, but larger and darker. They do not have a powder blue pruinescence which is common in Lestes. The pterostigma is pale brown and outlined in black. The thorax has thin yellow antehumeral areas and broader yellow stripe above a thin black line on each side; the upper edge of the stripe is irregular. Both C. viridis and C. parvidens have a prominent spur-like marking on the side of the thorax.

== Behaviour ==
Flight period is generally from May to November. In Cyprus, the flight season is from early April to January. Behaviour is similar to that described in C. viridis. It hangs with wings spread wide, often in the shade of trees near breeding water. Mature males defend vertical territories in marginal shrubs and small trees where they find and mate with females in the normal damselfly manner forming the wheel position. Egg laying occurs with the pair in tandem, the eggs being laid into incisions in the bark of overhanging branches, not into submerged vegetation as is the case in many damselflies. Egg laying can result in distinct oval galls forming in the shrub's bark. The eggs develop rapidly for a few weeks and then enter a diapause state. In this state the eggs development is very slow and it is in this state that the eggs overwinter. The following spring the eggs hatch, the larvae drop into the water and start to develop. Growth is rapid and adults can emerge in a couple of months. After emerging the adults move away from water to mature. In this stage of their life-cycle which in C. parvidens is quite long, the immature adults cannot breed. The adults need a period of time for their reproductive organs to develop and this non-breeding period also stops the adults breeding too early in the season. If the females lay eggs early in the year the eggs will develop when it is to warm to for them to enter diapause. They might hatch out before winter and the resultant larva will die when winter temperatures occur. When fully mature the adults return to water and start breeding.

== See also ==
- Lestidae
- List of damselflies of the world (Lestidae)
