= Visual adaptation =

Visual adaptation is the temporary change in sensitivity or perception when exposed to a new or intense stimulus, and the lingering afterimage that may result when the stimulus is removed. These continuous small adjustments reflect the neural coding process of the visual system, and exist so the brain can attempt to "normalize" the visual experience.

== Research ==
The aftereffects of exposure to a visual stimulus or pattern causes loss of sensitivity to that pattern and induces stimulus bias. An example of this phenomenon is the "lilac chaser", introduced by Jeremy Hinton. The stimulus here are lilac circles, that once removed, leave green circles that then become the most prominent stimulus. The fading of the lilac circles is due to a loss of sensitivity to that stimulus and the adaptation to the new stimulus. To experience the "lilac chaser" effect, the subject needs to fixate their eyes on the cross in the middle of the image, and after a while the effect will settle in. Visual coding, a process involved in visual adaptation, is the means by which the brain adapts to certain stimuli, resulting in a biased perception of those stimuli. This phenomenon is referred to as visual plasticity; the brain's ability to change and adapt according to certain, repeated stimuli, altering the way information is perceived and processed.

Lilac Chaser from Jeremy Hinton's experiment

The rate and strength of visual adaptation depends heavily on the number of stimuli presented simultaneously, as well as the amount of time for which the stimulus is present. Visual adaptation was found to be weaker when there were more stimuli present. Moreover, studies have found that stimuli can rival each other, which explains why higher numbers of simultaneous stimuli lead to lower stimulus adaptation. Studies have also found that visual adaptation can have a reversing effect; if the stimulus is absent long enough, the aftereffects of visual adaptation will subside. Studies have also shown that visual adaptation occurs in the early stages of processing. While longer stimulus durations can induce perceived aftereffects, even short fixations have been shown to induce rapid adaptation that can bias neural responses and perception at subsequent fixations.

== Face recognition ==
Perceptual adaptation plays a big role in identifying faces. In an experiment conducted by Gillian Rhodes, the effect of face adaptation was investigated, along with whether visual adaptation affects the recognition of faces. The experiment found that perceptual adaptation does, in fact, affect face recognition. Individuals tend to adapt to common facial features as early as after five minutes of looking at them. This suggests that humans adapt to common facial features, leaving neural resources and space to identify uncommon characteristics and features, which is how humans identify specific faces on a case-by-case basis.

Perceptual aftereffects for face recognition occur for several different stimuli, including gender, ethnicity, identity, emotion, and attractiveness of a face. The fact that this distinction occurs, implies that face recognition is a process that happens on a higher level and later on in the visual encoding, rather than early on within visual adaptation. The fact that the aftereffects in face recognition in particular are so strong, suggests that it is for the purpose of regulation of how processes work. This provides a sense of constancy in an individual's perception, while adapting to differences and possible versions of a stimulus allows for constancy and stability, and makes it easier to adapt to variations in a stimulus, while recognizing commonalities. These face perception cues are encoded in an individual's brain for extended periods of time, ensuring consistency over the individual's lifespan. A young person would perceive stimuli the same way as an older individual.

== Body size adaptation ==
Visual aftereffects have also been demonstrated in bodies. Individuals who are exposed to images of low fat (or low muscle) bodies have been shown to perceive subsequently-presented bodies as higher fat (or higher muscle) than they really are (and vice versa). Individuals who are less satisfied with their bodies have been shown to direct more visual attention to thin bodies, resulting in stronger adaptation to thin bodies, suggesting that visual adaptation may provide a mechanism for the association between exposure to thin media portrayals of bodies and body size misperception.

Body size adaptation effects are thought to be higher-level aftereffects.
