= Body checking =

Compulsive inspection of one's body measurements

Body checking is a compulsive behaviour related but not exclusive to various forms of body dysmorphic disorders. It involves frequently collecting various information about one's own body in terms of size, shape, appearance or weight. Frequent expressions of this form of behaviour entails for example mirror checking, trying to feel one's own bones, pinching the abdomen, frequent body weight measurement and comparing one's own body to that of others. Studies have shown that an increased rate of body checking correlates with an overall increased dissatisfaction with the own body.

== Characteristics ==
Compulsive body checking can be observed in many forms. Some of the more common signs are:

- Constant weighing
- Constantly checking oneself in the mirror
- Recording bodily changes
- Measuring body parts
- Comparing the body to other people’s bodies

Compulsive body checking behaviors are considered to overly emphasize the importance of one‘s body and its shape, which often occurs as a symptom in people with obsessive–compulsive disorder and eating disorders like anorexia nervosa and bulimia nervosa. Checking behaviors are common among those groups, because body checking temporarily induces stress relief and thereby reinforces the habit. In the long term it contributes to increased overall body dissatisfaction and can prevent full recovery.

== Components ==
=== Cognitive ===
People who engage in body checking tend to have discrepancies between their own body ideals and their subjective representation of their bodies. The desired body ideals are created by comparing oneself to others and making upward comparisons. These upward comparisons are often perpetrated by the use of social media, where it is easy to find pictures of one's desired body. Since social media pictures are often edited and people try to present themselves perfectly, body ideals are often very extreme and impossible to achieve. Additionally, people with eating disorders have a disturbed image of their body, subjectively perceiving themselves as less attractive than they are.

=== Affective ===
A negative image about one's own body is linked to several negative feelings or emotions, such as anxiety or shame (about the body itself), anger or aggression (at the appearance of oneself or others), and fear (of becoming less attractive). Self-objectification theory can be used to explain these affective responses. People with body image disturbances often look at themselves from a third-person view, reducing their self-worth to the way they look. Some or all of the above emotions can be experienced if their appearances do not match their expectations.

== Diagnosis ==
Body checking becomes problematic when it causes distress, has a negative impact on a person’s mood, causes withdrawal from social interactions, when it disrupts someone's daily functioning at work or outside of it. This can lead to an eating disorder or the worsening of an existing one. A healthcare provider can offer treatment recommendations to help with uncontrollable body checking behavior. The diagnostic assessment for body checking includes asking about personal and family medical history and performing a physical exam. The healthcare provider can refer the person to a psychologist or psychiatrist for further assessment. These mental health professionals can then diagnose a patient with body dysmorphic disorder (BDD) by evaluating the person’s attitude, behavior, and symptoms.

== Treatments ==
Body checking is most commonly a symptom of eating disorders (ED) and body image disturbance (BID). Treatments of EDs and BID involve treatments for body checking. Isolated research regarding body checking treatments without relating disorders is rare, as most individuals experience (severe) body checking in relation to their ED. Treatment of ED is mostly multidisciplinary, containing psychological as well as medical treatments.

Treatments used with body checking are:

- Psychotherapy can be used to treat eating disorders and symptoms such as body checking.
- Family therapy. Improvements of symptoms like body checking in people with EDs after family therapy have been shown in several cases, but there is little evidence yet for the effectiveness of family therapy on EDs.
- Cognitive behavioral therapy is a treatment that aims to teach how to recognise and change harmful thought patterns that lead to negative actions, such as body checking. Regarding EDs and BID, it focuses on reducing negative self-evaluation, body checking behaviour and self-objectification.
- Acceptance and commitment therapy. Pilot studies of acceptance and commitment therapy have shown significant increase in body satisfaction and decrease in body checking in trials with patients with BID.
- Mirror exposure entails organised exposure to body image, typically in forms of standing in front of a mirror. A study investigating in the effects of mirror exposure on BID found significant results regarding a decrease in body checking as a result of mirror exposure.
