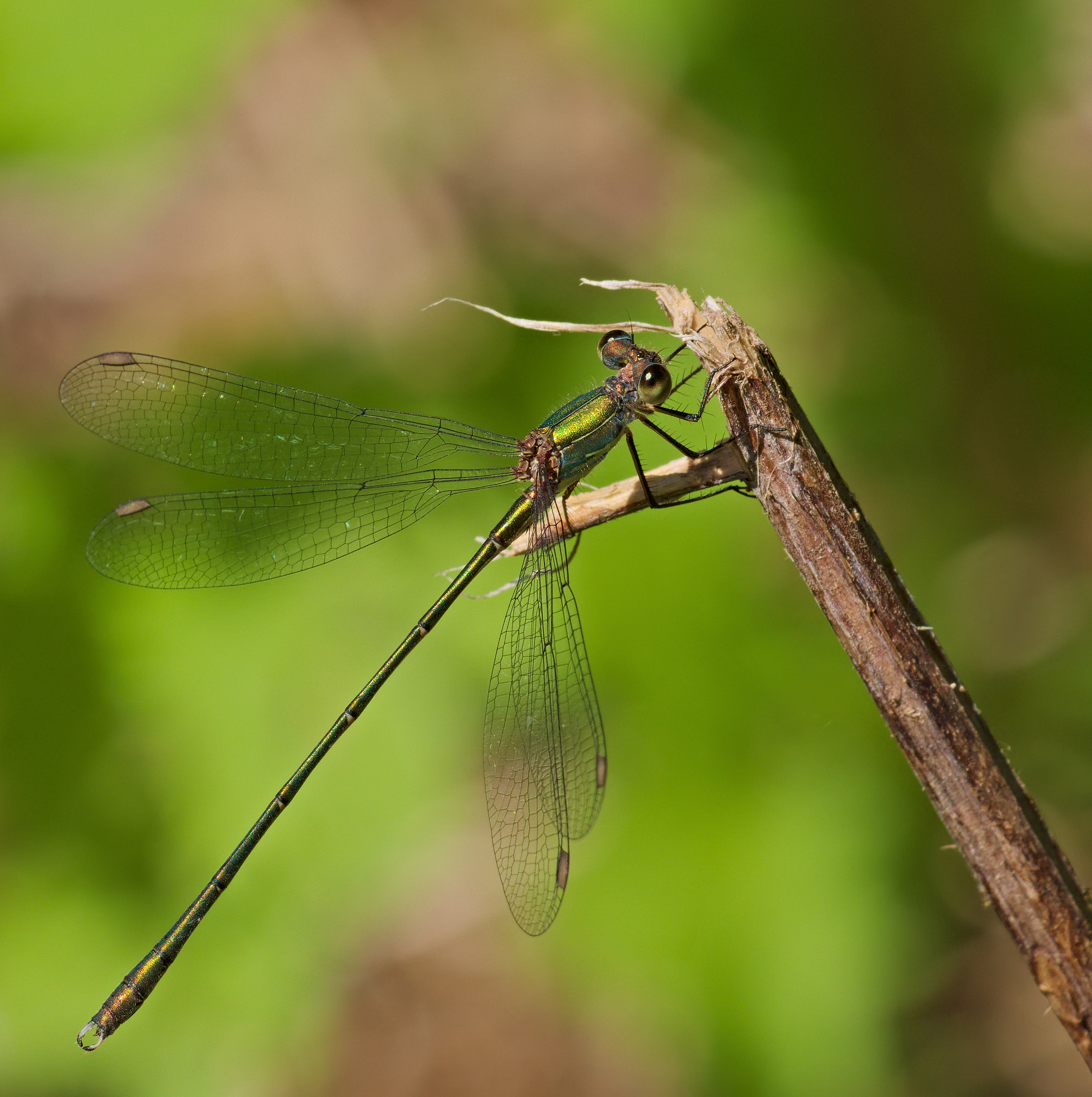

Conservation status
- Least Concern (IUCN 3.1)

Scientific classification
- Kingdom: Animalia
- Phylum: Arthropoda
- Class: Insecta
- Order: Odonata
- Suborder: Zygoptera
- Superfamily: Lestoidea
- Family: Lestidae
- Genus: Chalcolestes
- Species: C. viridis

Binomial name
- Chalcolestes viridis (Vander Linden, 1825)

Synonyms
- Lestes viridis Vander Linden, 1825

= Chalcolestes viridis =

Species of damselfly

Chalcolestes viridis, formerly Lestes viridis, is a damselfly of the family Lestidae. It has a metallic green body and at rest it holds its wings away from its body. Its common name is the willow emerald damselfly, the green emerald damselfly, or the western willow spreadwing. It has an elongated abdomen and pale brown spots on its wings and resides in areas of still water with overhanging trees.

== Taxonomy ==
The genus Chalcolestes is separated from Lestes because of differences in their larvae.

A closely related species C. parvidens used to be considered a sub-species of C. viridis. C. parvidens occurs in Greece, Bulgaria, Croatia and in Italy; near Rome it flies with C. viridis in the same ponds. There are small morphological differences between the two species both as adults and larvae and analysis of proteins from the two species, by electrophoresis, also supports their separation into two species, but they are hard to tell apart in the field. C. parvidens flies earlier in the year than C. viridis.

== Distribution and habitat ==
C. viridis is found across southern and central Europe and in North Africa. In the eastern mediterranean it is replaced by C. parvidens with areas of overlap in Italy and the Balkans. C. viridis is found on many mediterranean islands including Corsica, Sicily, Mallorca, Menorca and Ibiza, in the Maghreb in North Africa, Turkey and the Middle East. However many of the old records for C. viridis in the east of its range could be for C. parvidens. It occurs in still or slow flowing water in ditches, ponds, lakes and canals, with overhanging willows, alders or birches, which are used for breeding. Of all the European Lestes it is the species, along with C. parvidens, that will lay eggs in where there is running water. The adults are often found in the bushes which grow over or alongside water.

=== Status in Britain ===
In Britain, C. viridis is a recent colonist. It was spotted in Britain on just two occasions in the 20th century. From 2009 onwards, it experienced a population boom, centred in East Anglia. By 2024, it had spread to much of eastern England.

== Identification ==
In the field it is not possible to reliably distinguish C. viridis from C. parvidens. Both species are mainly metallic green, like other Lestes damselflies, but larger and darker, and they do not have a powder blue pruinescence which is common in other Lestes. The pterostigma is pale brown and outlined in black. The thorax has thin yellow antehumeral areas and a broader yellow stripe above a thin black line on each side; the upper edge of the stripe is irregular. Both C. viridis and C. parvidens have a prominent spur-like marking on the side of the thorax.

Male – The abdomen is very long. The lower anal appendages are less than half the length of the upper which are a distinctive pale yellow with black tips.

Female – The ovipositor is longer than in Lestes dryas.

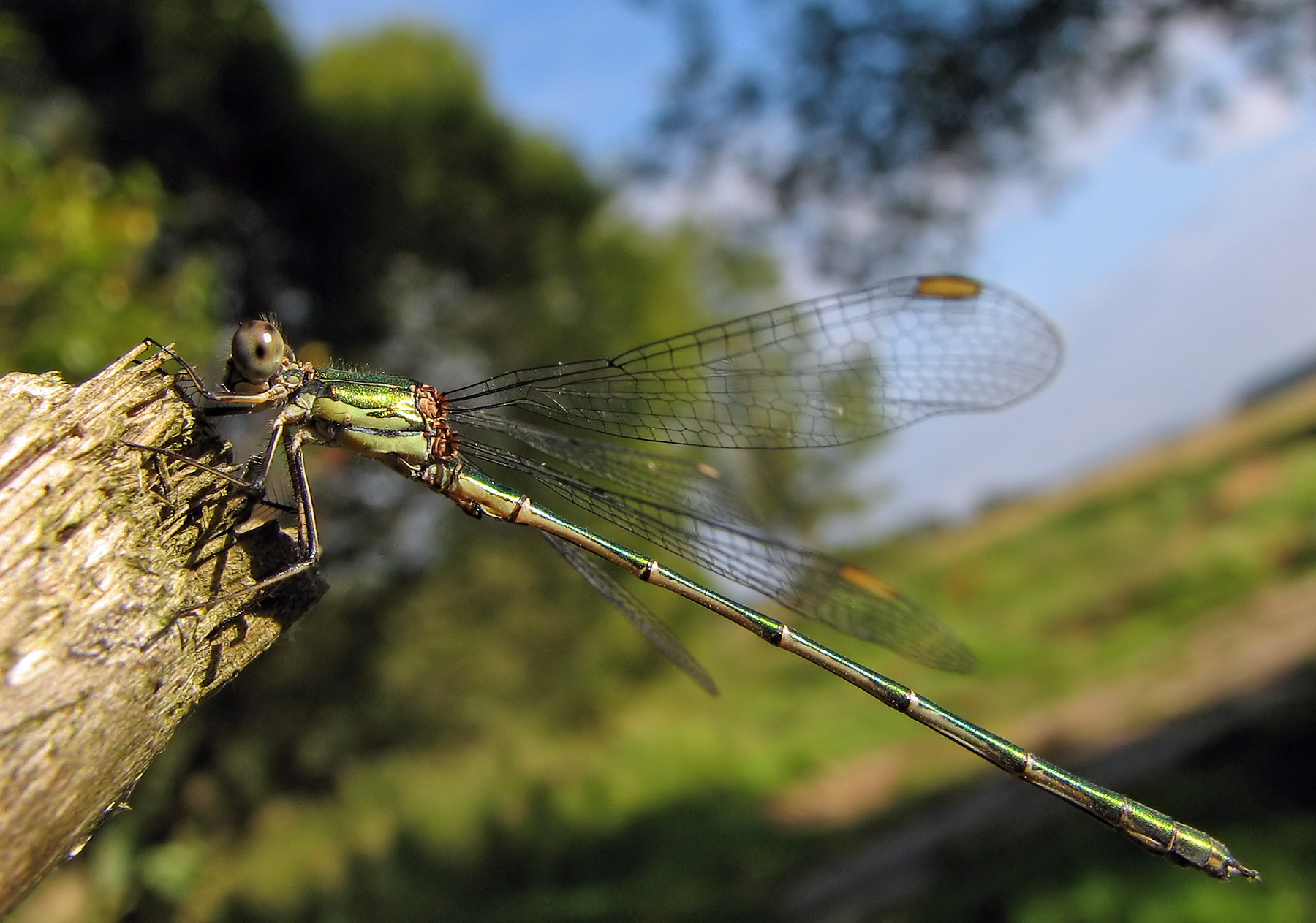
C. viridis male

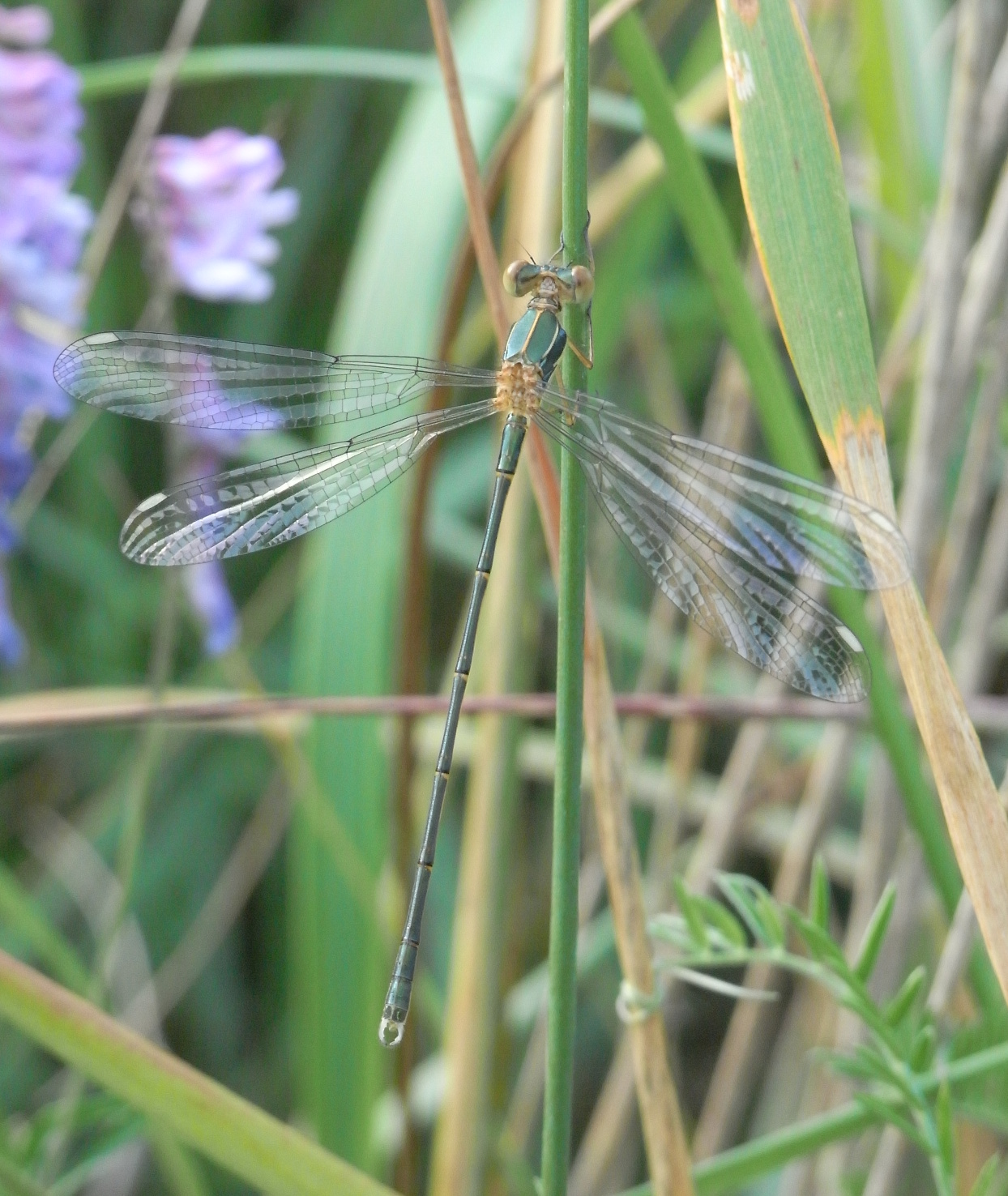
C. viridis teneral male.

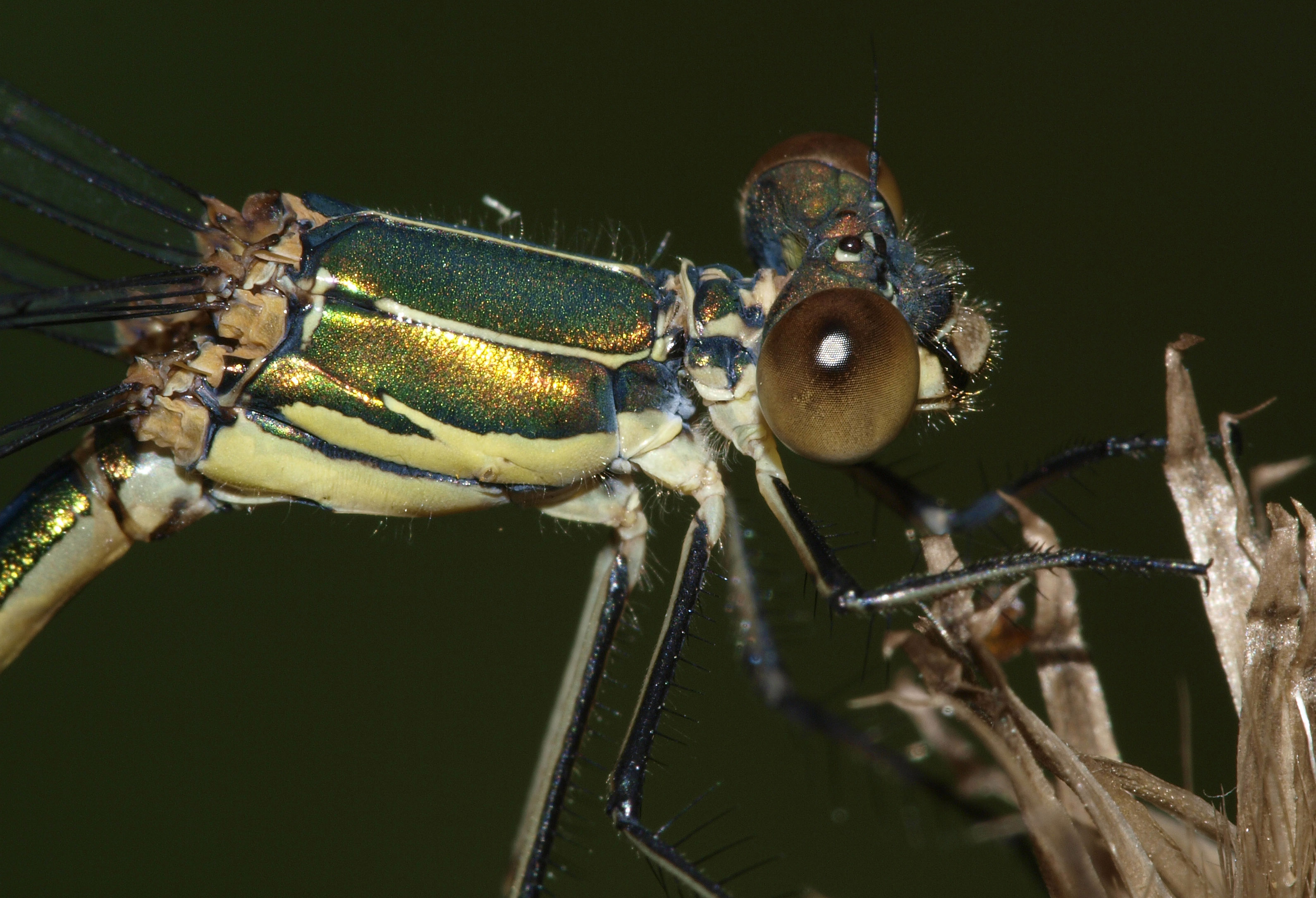
Female

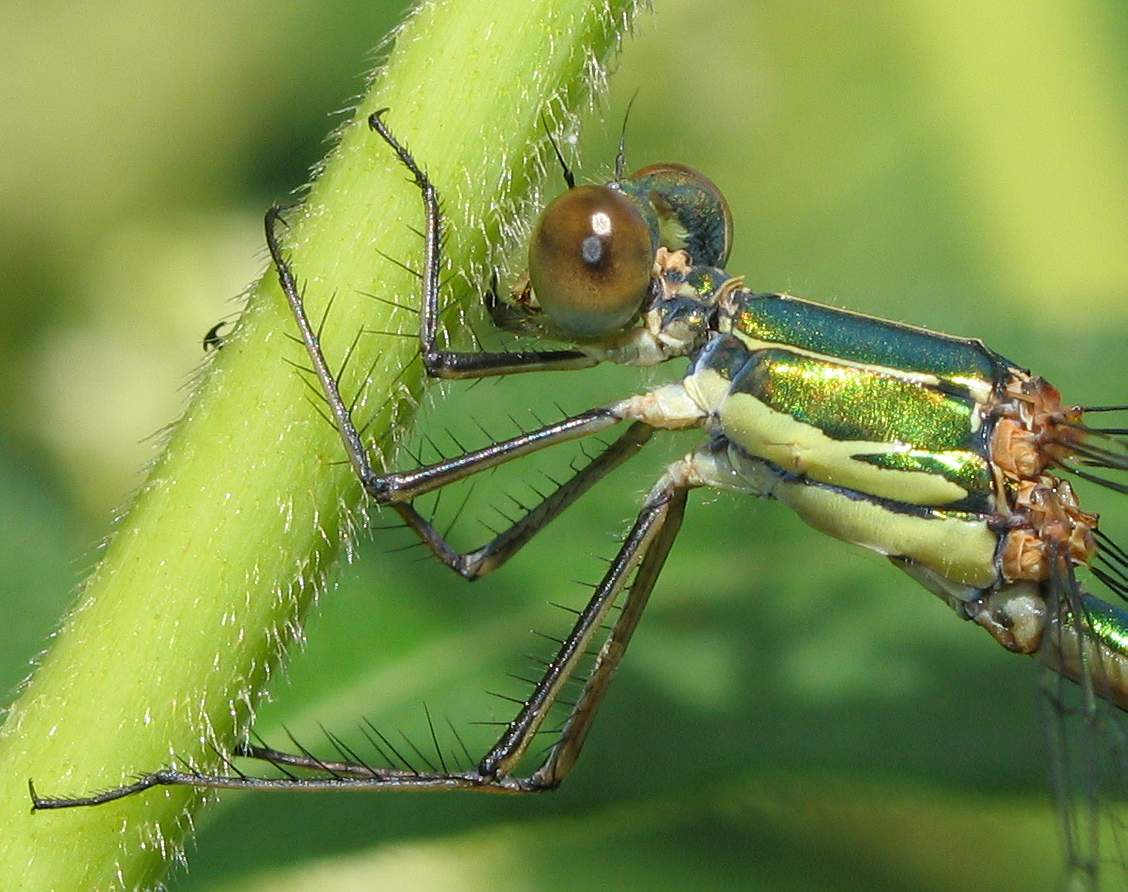
C. viridis showing spur-like mark in thorax.

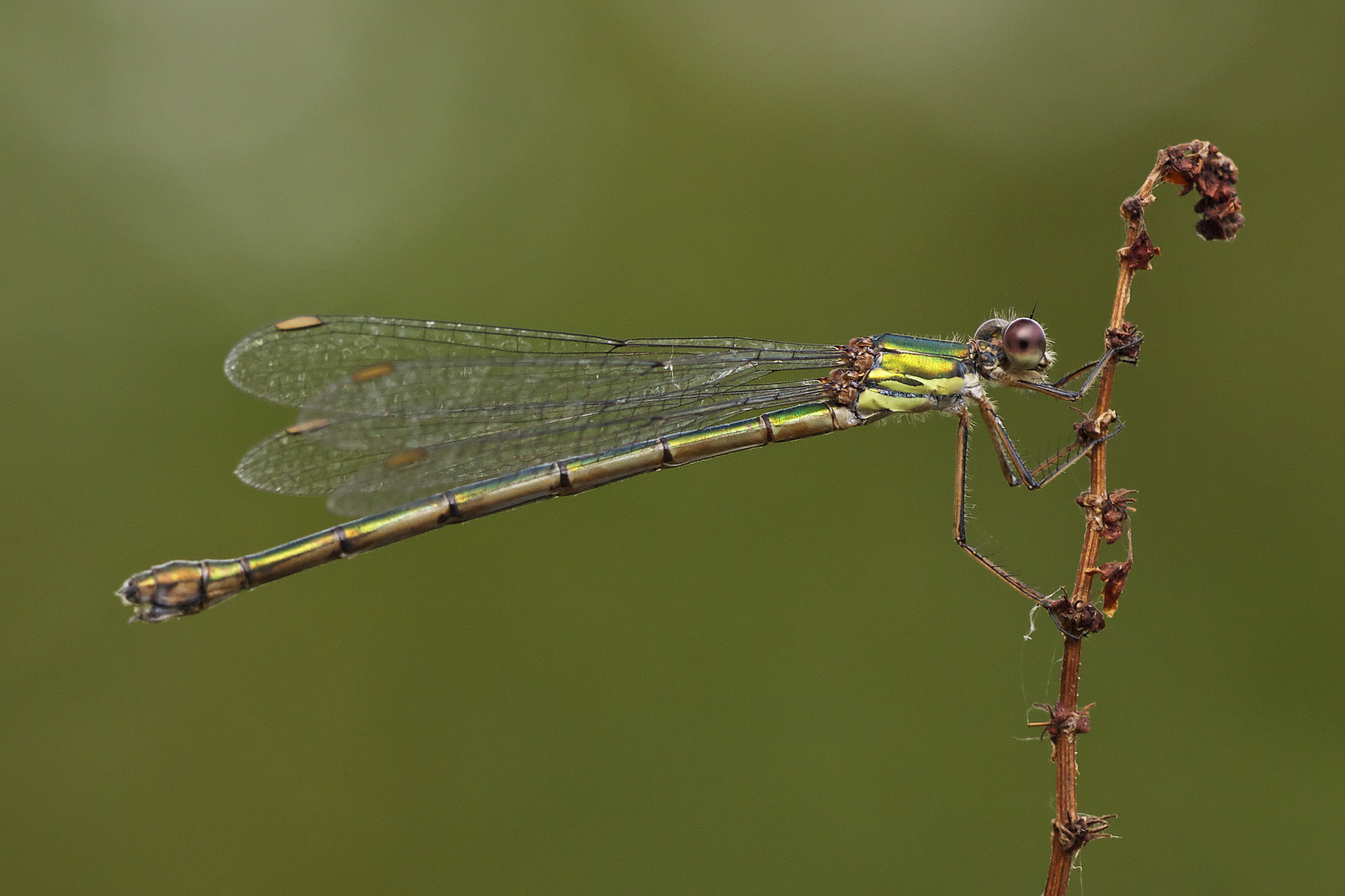
C. viridis female.

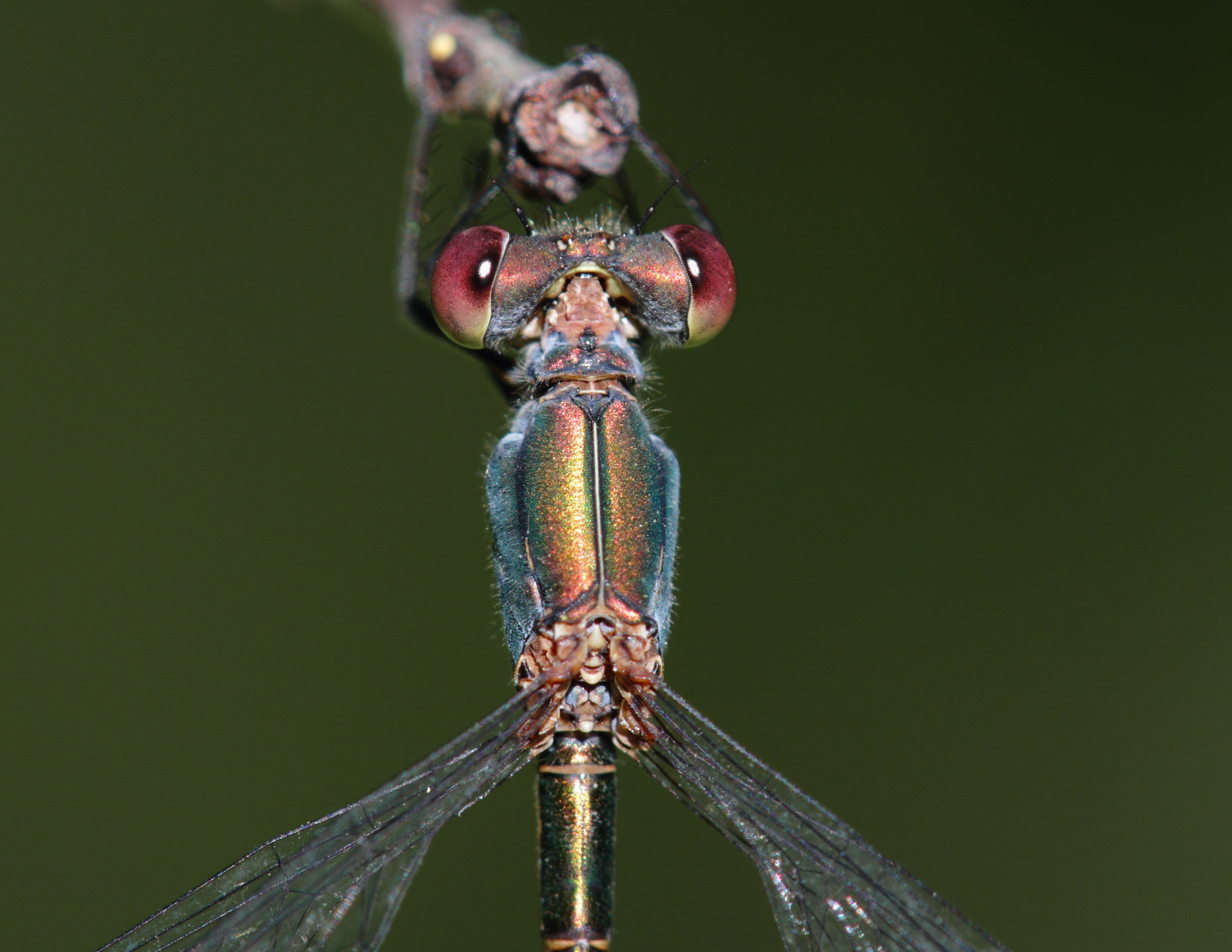
C.viridis female. Closeup.

== Behaviour ==
Flight period is late from August to October although in the southernmost parts of its range it can occur as early as May and persist until November.

Mature males defend vertical territories in marginal shrubs and small trees where they find and mate with females in the normal damselfly manner forming the wheel position. Egg laying occurs with the pair in tandem, the eggs being laid into incisions in the bark of overhanging branches, not into submerged vegetation as is the case in many damselflies. Egg laying can result in distinct oval galls forming in the shrub's bark. The eggs develop rapidly for a few weeks and then enter a diapause state. In this state the eggs development is very slow and it is in this state that the eggs overwinter. The following spring the eggs hatch, the larvae drop into the water and start to develop. Growth is rapid and adults can emerge in a couple of months. After emerging the adults move away from water to mature. In this stage of their life-cycle the immature adults cannot breed. The adults need a period of time for their reproductive organs to develop and this non-breeding period also stops the adults breeding too early in the season. If the females lay eggs early in the year the eggs will develop when it is to warm to for them to enter diapause. They might hatch out before winter and the resultant larva will die when winter temperatures occur. When fully mature the adults return to water and start breeding.

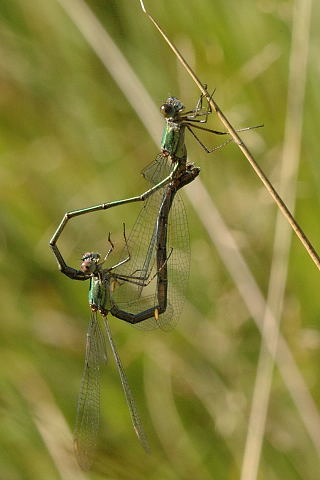
C. viridis in copula

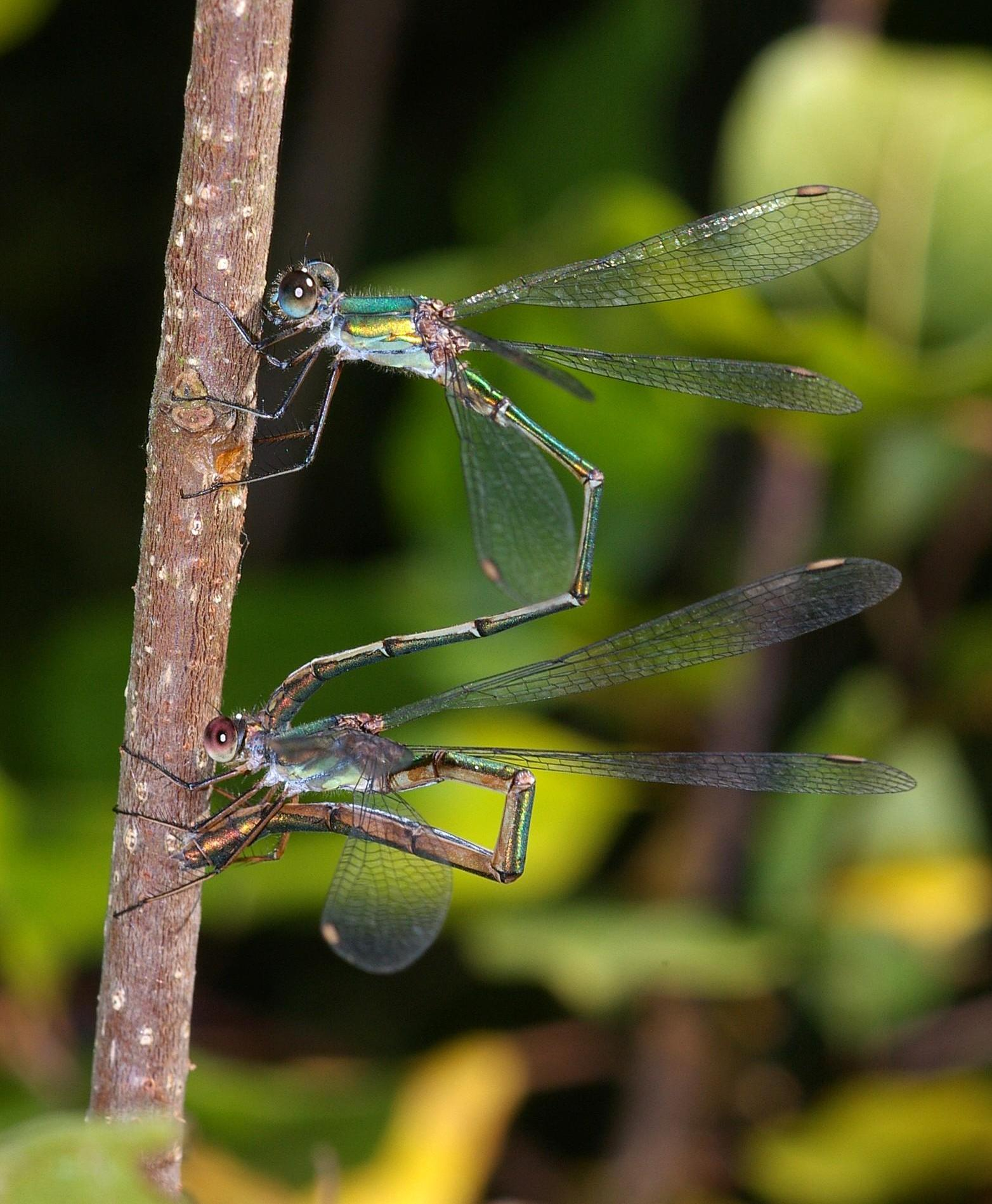
C. viridis egg laying whilst in tandem. The female, bottom is inserting eggs into the twig.

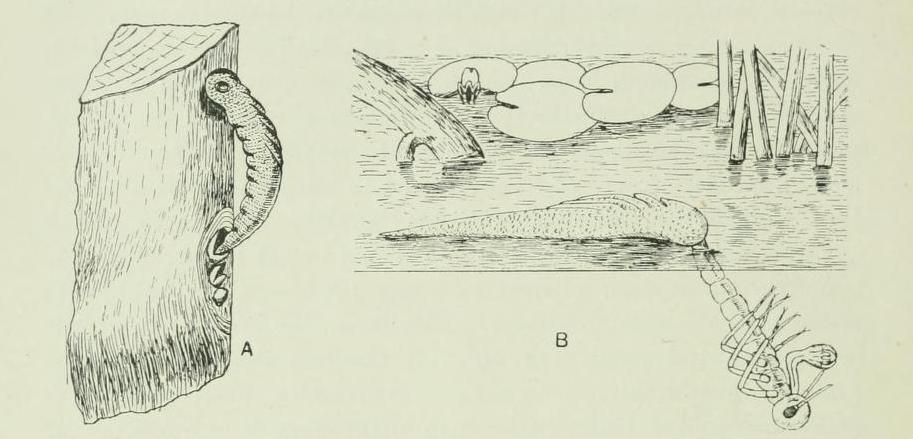
Hatching of C. viridis by Tillyard based on Abbe Pierre (1904)

== See also ==
- List of damselflies of the world (Lestidae)
- Lestidae
- Lestes
