= Gillian Rhodes =

Psychologist in Australia

- Born: 1955 (age 70–71)
- Awards: Fellow of the Academy of the Social Sciences in Australia

Academic background
- Thesis: Mental representations of faces (1986)

Gillian Isobel Rhodes FASSA (born 1955) is an academic psychologist, and is a Winthrop Professor at the University of Western Australia. Rhodes works on facial recognition and perception. She is a Fellow of the Academy of the Social Sciences in Australia. Rhodes was awarded an Australian Research Council Distinguished Outstanding Researcher Award.

== Academic career ==
Rhodes completed a Bachelor's degree at the University of Canterbury, a Master of Science at the University of Auckland, with a thesis on facial perception, followed by a PhD titled Mental representations of faces at Stanford University. Rhodes has worked at the University of Otago and the University of Canterbury in New Zealand, and most recently at the University of Western Australia, where she is a Winthrop Professor.

With Romina Palermo, Rhodes co-led the Person Perception programme of the Australian Research Council Centre of Excellence in Cognition and its Disorders, which ceased work in 2018.

Rhodes works on facial perception, and is particularly interested in the mechanisms through which people perceive faces, how these mechanisms develop during childhood, and how they can differ between individuals. Her work on whether women tell if a man is cheating from his appearance, and the relationship between semen quality and voice depth, received international attention.

== Honours and awards ==
Rhodes is a Fellow of the Academy of the Social Sciences in Australia. She was elected a Fellow of the American Association for Psychological Science in 2011. She received the Golden Jubilee Special Award from the New Zealand Psychological Society in 1998, and in 1992 had been awarded their Hunter Award. Rhodes is an Australian Research Council Distinguished Outstanding Researcher.

== Selected works ==
- Rhodes, Gillian Isobel (2006). "The evolutionary psychology of facial beauty". Annual Review of Psychology. 57: 199–226. doi:10.1146/annurev.psych.57.102904.190208. PMID 16318594. Wikidata Q28284448.
- Palermo, Romina; Rhodes, Gillian Isobel (2006). "Are you always on my mind? A review of how face perception and attention interact". Neuropsychologia. 45 (1): 75–92. doi:10.1016/j.neuropsychologia.2006.04.025. PMID 16797607. Wikidata Q36517409.
- Rhodes, Gillian Isobel; Fiona Proffitt; Jonathon M. Grady; Alex Sumich (1998). "Facial symmetry and the perception of beauty". Psychonomic Bulletin and Review. 5 (4): 659–669. doi:10.3758/bf03208842. Wikidata Q121597657.
- Rhodes, Gillian Isobel; S Brake; Atkinson, Anthony (1993). "What's lost in inverted faces?". Cognition. 47 (1): 25–57. doi:10.1016/0010-0277(93)90061-y. PMID 8482070. Wikidata Q40901866.
- Rhodes, Gillian Isobel; S Brennan; S Carey (1987). "Identification and ratings of caricatures: implications for mental representations of faces". Cognitive Psychology. 19 (4): 473–497. doi:10.1016/0010-0285(87)90016-8. PMID 3677584. Wikidata Q52073398.
- Rhodes, Gillian Isobel; Leigh W. Simmons; Marianne Peters (2005). "Attractiveness and sexual behavior: Does attractiveness enhance mating success?". Evolution and Human Behavior. 26 (2): 186–201. doi:10.1016/j.evolhumbehav.2004.08.014. Wikidata Q56070334.
- Rhodes, Gillian Isobel; Janelle Chan; Leslie A Zebrowitz; Leigh W Simmons (2003). "Does sexual dimorphism in human faces signal health?". Proceedings of the Royal Society B. 270 (Suppl 1): S93-5. doi:10.1098/rsbl.2003.0023. PMC 1698019. PMID 12952647. Wikidata Q24673142.
- Rhodes, Gillian Isobel; Grace Morley; Simmons, Leigh (2012). "Women can judge sexual unfaithfulness from unfamiliar men's faces". Biology Letters. 9 (1) 20120908. doi:10.1098/rsbl.2012.0908. PMC 3565506. PMID 23221873. Wikidata Q36590526.
- Simmons, Leigh; Marianne Peters; Rhodes, Gillian Isobel (2011). "Low pitched voices are perceived as masculine and attractive but do they predict semen quality in men?". PLOS One. 6 (12) e29271. Bibcode:2011PLoSO...629271S. doi:10.1371/journal.pone.0029271. PMC 3244455. PMID 22216228. Wikidata Q30471672.
