= Extrastriate body area =

Area of the brain's visual cortex involved in identifying body parts

Details
- Part of: Extrastriate cortex

The extrastriate body area (EBA) is a subpart of the extrastriate visual cortex involved in the visual perception of human body and body parts, akin in its respective domain to the fusiform face area, involved in the perception of human faces. The EBA was identified in 2001 by the team of Nancy Kanwisher using fMRI.

== Function ==
The extrastriate body area is a category-selective region for the visual processing of static and moving images of the human body and parts of it. It is also modulated even in the absence of visual feedback from the limb movement. It is insensitive to faces and stimulus categories unrelated to the human body. The extrastriate cortex responds not only during the perception of other people's body parts but also during goal-directed movement of the participant's body parts. The extrastriate cortex represents the human body in a more integrative and dynamic manner, being able to detect an incongruence of internal body or action representations and external visual signals. In this way, the EBA might be able to support the disentangling of one's own behavior from another's.

== Experiments and Research ==
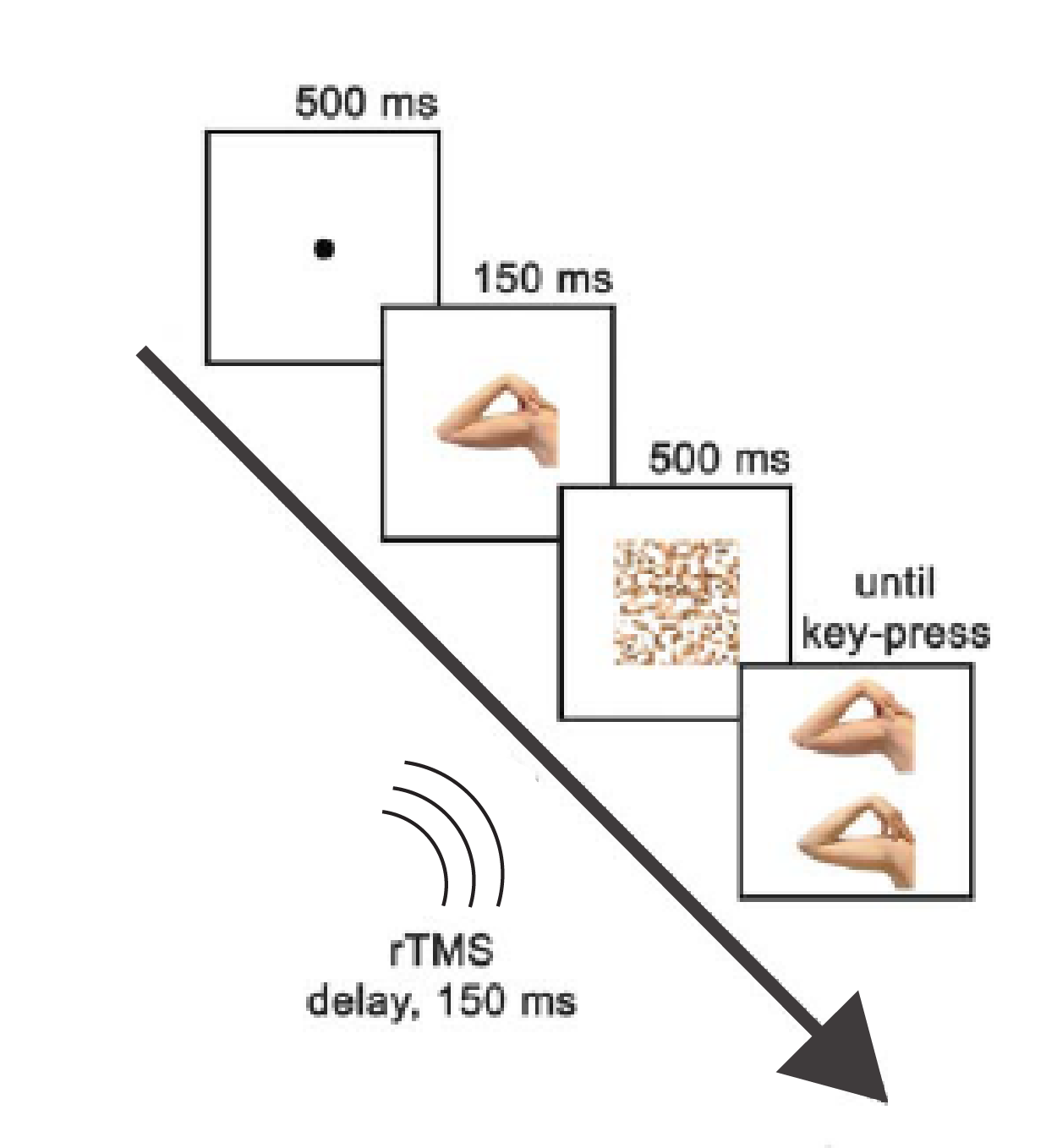
Timeline of the task, study by Urgesi et al. (2004)

As published in the article, “A Cortical Area Selective for Visual Processing of the Human Body,” researcher, Paul E. Downing, Yuhong Jiang, Miles Shuman and Nancy Kanwisher, first discovered the EBA in 2001. The experiment originally intended to find out what area of the brain dealt with the human form and recognition of body parts, as the face had been mapped to a specific area of the brain (Fusiform Face Area, FFA) by Nancy Kanwisher in 1997. What the experiment found was a specific area of the lateral occipitotemporal cortex that responds selectively to visual images of human bodies and body parts, with the exception of faces.

The experiment had subjects view images of different objects, including faces (as a control group), body parts, animals, parts of the face and intimate objects. While viewing the images, the subjects were scanned with an fMRI to see what area of the brain was activated. Through the trials a compilation of the fMRI’s was made. From this compilation image a specific region was determined to have increased activity when shown visual stimuli of body parts and even more activity when viewing whole bodies.

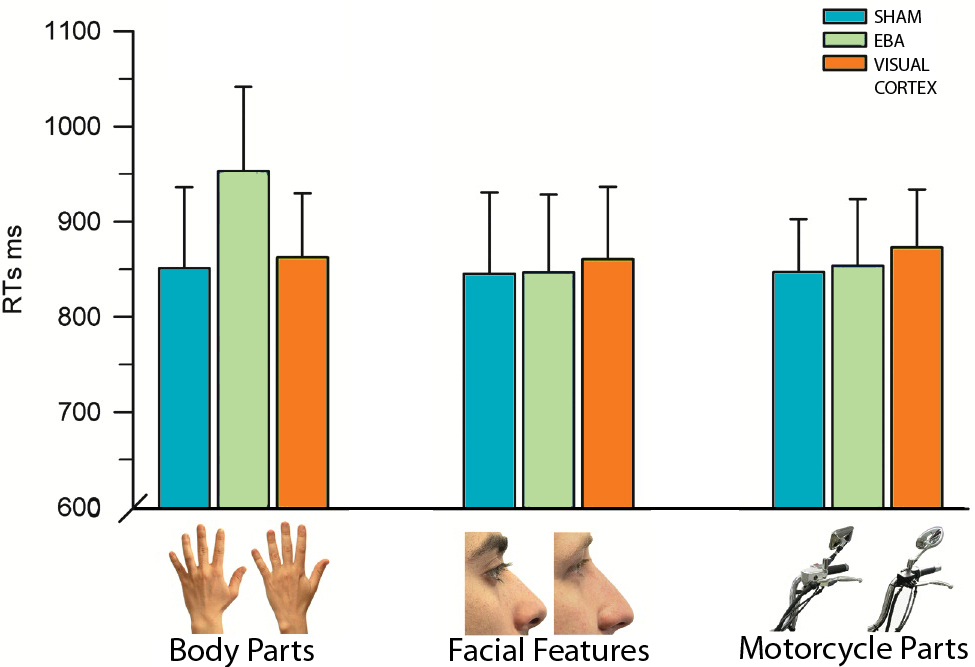
Reaction time graph, study by Urgesi et al. (2004)

There have been no studies involving brain damage to the EBA. Thus far, only scans of brain activity, as well as transcranial magnetic stimulation, have been used to study the EBA. To find the specific functions of the EBA, Comimo Urgesi, Giovanni Berlucchi and Salvatore M. Aglioti used repetitive transcranial magnetic stimulation (rTMS) to disrupt part of the brain, making the brain less responsive in the target area. The study used event-related rTMS to disrupt the EBA, resulting in inactivation of cortical areas. This inactivation caused a slower response time in discriminating body parts. The study used facial features and motorcycle parts as non human parts for control groups. The facial features and motorcycle body parts did not display any change in response time. The neural activity data shows the EBA handles some of the visual processing of human body and parts but is not related to the processing of the face or other objects.

The actual experiment had people make a “two-choice matching-to-sample task. Fourteen right handed participants were required to decide which of two similar upper-limb images matched a single sample previously seen during a tachistoscopic exposure. Photos of face parts and motorcycle parts served as control stimuli in two-matching-to-sample tasks that were comparable to the former task.” rTMS was then applied 150 ms after each sample exposure. The section of the graph, Body Parts, shows the response time while using rTMS. The SHAM category refers to measuring the EBA without rTMS while viewing the images. The Visual Cortex category measures the response of the FFA to be used as the control of the experiment. This measurement of response time, occurring while rTMS was effecting the EBA, further shows that the two areas process visual data of the human form, yet respond to different stimuli. While the magnetic stimulation was temporarily disabling the extrastriate body area, reaction time decreased by about 100 ms. The data from the Sham and Visual Cortex categories on the graph show what was the expected normal results from the experiment. This evidence reveals that applying rTMS to the EBA slowed the response of recognizing images of body parts.
