= Body dysmorphic disorder =

Mental disorder

- Other names: Body dysmorphia, dysmorphic syndrome, dysmorphophobia
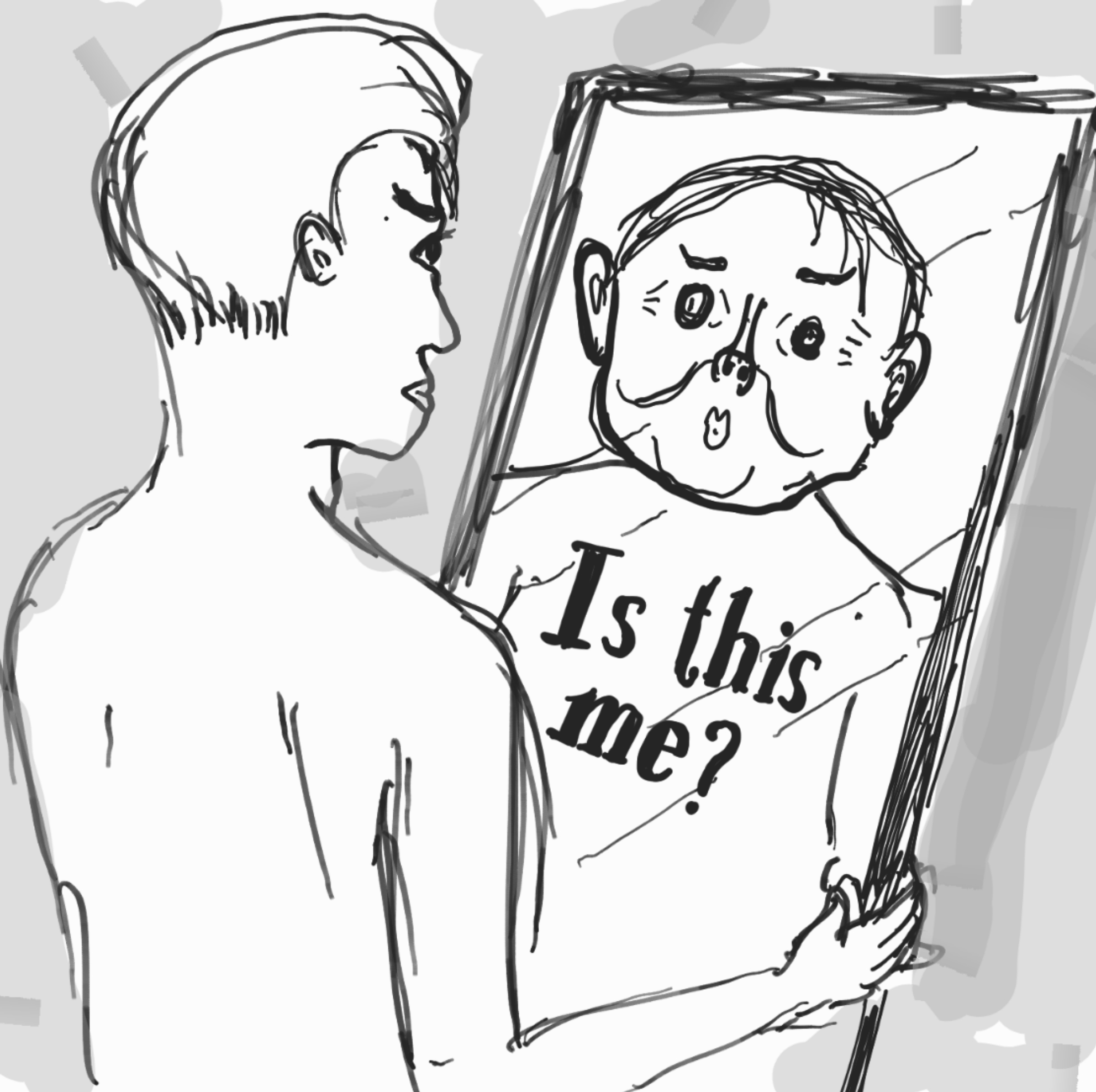
- A cartoon of a patient with body dysmorphia looking in a mirror, seeing a distorted image of himself
- Specialty: Psychiatry, clinical psychology
- Symptoms: Fear of perceived body image flaws, misconceptions about one's own physical appearance, body-checking behavior
- Complications: Suicide, self-harm
- Risk factors: Low self-esteem, traumatic events, media exposure
- Treatment: Cognitive behavioral therapy (CBT)
- Medication: SSRIs

Body dysmorphic disorder (BDD), also known in some contexts as dysmorphophobia or simply dysmorphia, is a mental disorder defined by an overwhelming preoccupation with a perceived flaw in one's physical appearance. In BDD's delusional variant, the flaw is imagined. When an actual visible difference exists, its importance is disproportionately magnified in the mind of the individual. Whether the physical issue is real or imagined, ruminations concerning this perceived defect become pervasive and intrusive, consuming substantial mental bandwidth for extended periods each day. This excessive preoccupation induces severe emotional distress and also disrupts daily functioning and activities. The DSM-5 places BDD within the obsessive–compulsive spectrum, distinguishing it from disorders such as anorexia nervosa.

BDD is estimated to affect up to 2 to 3% of the population. It usually starts during adolescence, and affects men and women at roughly similar rates. The BDD subtype muscle dysmorphia, perceiving the body as too small, affects mostly men. In addition to thinking about it, the sufferer typically checks and compares the perceived flaw repetitively and can adopt unusual routines to avoid social contact that exposes it. Fearing the stigma of vanity, they usually hide this preoccupation. Commonly overlooked even by psychiatrists, BDD has been underdiagnosed. As the disorder severely impairs quality of life due to educational and occupational dysfunction and social isolation, those experiencing BDD tend to have high rates of suicidal thoughts and may attempt suicide.

== Signs and symptoms ==
Dislike of one's appearance is common, but individuals with BDD have extreme misperceptions about their physical appearance. Whereas vanity involves a quest to aggrandize the appearance, BDD is experienced as a quest to merely normalize the appearance. Although delusional in about one of three cases, the appearance concern is usually non-delusional, an overvalued idea.

The bodily area of focus is commonly face, skin, stomach, arms and legs, but can be nearly any part of the body. In addition, multiple areas can be focused on simultaneously. A subtype of body dysmorphic disorder is muscle dysmorphia, also called reverse anorexia and bigorexia. In muscular dysmorphia, patients perceive their body as excessively thin despite being muscular and trained. Many seek dermatological treatment or cosmetic surgery, which typically does not resolve the distress. On the other hand, attempts at self-treatment, as by skin picking, can create lesions where none previously existed.

BDD is a disorder in the obsessive–compulsive spectrum, but involves more depression and social avoidance despite a degree of overlap with obsessive–compulsive disorder (OCD). BDD often associates with social anxiety disorder (SAD). Some experience delusions that others are covertly pointing out their flaws. In some studies, the level of delusionality in people with BDD is higher than those with schizophrenia. Cognitive testing and neuroimaging suggest both a bias toward detailed visual analysis and a tendency toward emotional hyper-arousal.

Most generally, one experiencing BDD ruminates over the perceived bodily defect several hours daily or longer, uses either social avoidance or camouflaging with cosmetics or apparel, repetitively checks the appearance, compares it to that of other people, and might often seek verbal reassurances. One might sometimes avoid mirrors, repetitively change outfits, groom excessively, or restrict eating.

BDD's severity can wax and wane, and flareups tend to yield absences from school, work, or socializing, sometimes leading to protracted social isolation, with some becoming housebound for extended periods. Social impairment is usually greatest, sometimes approaching avoidance of all social activities. Poor concentration and motivation impair academic and occupational performance. The distress of BDD tends to exceed that of major depressive disorder and rates of suicidal ideation and attempts are especially high. For example, studies have reported that up to 69% of people with BDD experience suicidal ideation and 50% attempt suicide.

== Prevalence ==
A large systematic review and meta-analysis estimated the global prevalence of BDD in the general population to be approximately 17%. Prevalence estimates vary by world region, with the highest rates observed in Latin America (31%), followed by Africa (23%), Asia (17%), Europe (14%), North America (12%) and Oceania (10%). BDD is more commonly identified in clinical settings than in community samples, with estimated prevalence rates of 24% among patients seeking plastic surgery, 18% among psychiatric patients and 16% among dermatological patients.

== Causes ==
As with most mental disorders, BDD's cause is likely intricate, altogether biopsychosocial, through an interaction of multiple factors, including genetic, developmental, psychological, social, and cultural. BDD usually develops during early adolescence, although many patients note earlier trauma, abuse, neglect, teasing, or bullying. In many cases, social anxiety earlier in life precedes BDD. Though twin studies on BDD are few, one estimated its heritability at 43%. Yet other factors may be introversion, negative body image, perfectionism, heightened aesthetic sensitivity, and childhood abuse and neglect.

=== Childhood trauma ===
The development of body dysmorphia can stem from trauma caused by parents/guardians, family, or close friends. In a study published in 2021 about the prevalence of childhood maltreatment among adults with body dysmorphia, researchers found that more than 75% of respondents had experienced some form of abuse as children. Indeed, the researchers found that adults who had a history of emotional neglect as children were especially vulnerable to BDD, though other forms of abuse, including physical and sexual abuse, were also identified as significant risk factors. As the children progress into their adult years, they start to visualise the abuse that has been done to their bodies, and start finding ways to hide, cover, or change it so they are not reminded of the trauma that they endured as an adolescent.

=== Social media ===
Constant use of social media and "selfie taking" may translate into low self-esteem and body dysmorphic tendencies. The sociocultural theory of self-esteem states that the messages given by media and peers about the importance of appearance are internalized by individuals who adopt others' standards of beauty as their own. Due to excessive social media use and selfie taking, individuals may become preoccupied about presenting an ideal photograph for the public. Specifically, females' mental health has been the most affected by persistent exposure to social media. Girls with BDD present symptoms of low self-esteem and negative self-evaluation. Due to social media's expectations, a factor of why individuals have body dysmorphia can come from women comparing themselves with media images of ideal female attractiveness, a perceived discrepancy between their actual attractiveness and the media's standard of attractiveness is likely to result. Researchers in Istanbul Bilgi University and Bogazici University in Turkey found that individuals who have low self-esteem participate more often in trends of taking selfies along with using social media to mediate their interpersonal interaction in order to fulfill their self-esteem needs. The self-verification theory, explains how individuals use selfies to gain verification from others through likes and comments. Social media may therefore trigger one's misconception about their physical look. Similar to those with body dysmorphic tendencies, such behavior may lead to constant seeking of approval, self-evaluation and even depression.

In 2019 systematic review using Web of Science, PsycINFO, and PubMed databases was used to identify social networking site patterns. In particular appearance focused social media use was found to be significantly associated with greater body image dissatisfaction. It is highlighted that comparisons appear between body image dissatisfaction and BDD symptomatology. They concluded that heavy social media use may mediate the onset of sub-threshold BDD.

Individuals with BDD tend to engage in heavy plastic surgery use. In 2018, the plastic surgeon Dr. Tijon Esho coined term "Snapchat Dysmorphia" to describe a trend of patients seeking plastic surgeries to mimic "filtered" pictures. Filtered photos, such as those on Instagram and Snapchat, often present unrealistic and unattainable looks that may be a causal factor in triggering BDD.

=== Sociocultural perspective ===
Historically, body dysmorphic disorder was originally coined "dysmorphophobia", a term which was widely applied in research literature among the Japanese, Russians, and Europeans. However, in American literature, the appearance of BDD was still overlooked in the 1980s. It was introduced in the DSM-III by the APA, and the diagnostic criteria were not properly defined, as the non-delusional and delusional factors were not separated. This was later resolved with the revision of the DSM-III, which aided many by providing appropriate treatment for patients. BDD was initially considered non-delusional in European research, and was grouped with "monosymptomatic hypochondriacal psychoses" – delusional paranoia disorders, before being introduced in the DSM-III.

In 1991, the demographics of individuals who experience BDD were primarily single women aged 19 or older. This statistic has not changed over the decades; women are still considered the predominant gender to experience BDD. With the rise of social media platforms, individuals are easily able to seek validation and openly compare their physical appearance to online influences, finding more flaws and defects in their own appearance. This leads to attempts to conceal the defect such as seeking out surgeons to resolve the issue of perceived ugliness.

Universally, it is evident that different cultures place much emphasis on correcting the human body aesthetic, and that this preoccupation with body image is not exclusive to just one society; one example is the binding of women's feet in Chinese culture.

Whilst physically editing the body is not unique to any one culture, research suggests that it is more common throughout Western society and is on the rise. On close observation of contemporary Western societies, there has been an increase in disorders such as Body dysmorphic disorder, arising from ideals around the aesthetic of the human body. Scholars such as Nancy Scheper-Hughes have suggested such demand placed upon Western bodies has been around since the beginning of the 19th century, and that it has been driven by sexuality. Research also shows that BDD is linked to high comorbidity and suicidality rates. Furthermore, it appears that Caucasian women show higher rates of body dissatisfaction than women of different ethnic backgrounds and societies.

Socio-cultural models depict and emphasise the way thinness is valued, and beauty is obsessed over in Western culture, where advertising, marketing, and social media play a large role in manicuring the "perfect" body shape, size, and look. The billions of dollars spent to sell products become causal factors of image conscious societies. Advertising also supports a specific ideal body image and creates a social capital in how individuals can acquire this ideal.

However, personal attitudes towards the body do vary cross-culturally. Some of this variability can be accounted for due to factors such as food insecurity, poverty, climate, and fertility management. Cultural groups who experience food insecurity generally prefer larger-bodied women. However, many societies that have abundant access to food also value moderate to larger bodies. This is evident in a comparative study of body image, body perception, body satisfaction, body-related self-esteem, and overall self-esteem of German, Guatemalan Q'eqchi' and Colombian women. Unlike the German and Colombian women, the Q'eqchi' women in this study live in the jungles of Guatemala and remain relatively removed from modern technology and secure food resources. The study found that the Q'eqchi' women did not have notably higher body satisfaction when compared to the German or Colombian women.

Nevertheless, the Q'eqchi' women also showed the greatest distortion in their own body perception, estimating their physique to be slimmer than it actually was. It is thought this could be due to a lack of access to body monitoring tools such as mirrors, scales, technology, and clothing choices, but in this instance, body distortion does not seem to influence body satisfaction. This has also been shown in groups of lower-income African American women, where the acceptance of larger bodies is not necessarily equivalent to positive body image.

Similar studies have noted a high prevalence of BDD in East Asian societies, where facial dissatisfaction is especially common, indicating that this is not just a Western phenomenon.

== Diagnosis ==
Estimates of prevalence and gender distribution have varied widely via discrepancies in diagnosis and reporting. In American psychiatry, BDD gained diagnostic criteria in the DSM-IV, having been historically unrecognized, only making its first appearance in the DSM in 1987, but clinicians' knowledge of it, especially among general practitioners, is constricted. Meanwhile, shame about having the bodily concern, and fear of the stigma of vanity, makes many hide even having the concern.

Via shared symptoms, BDD is commonly misdiagnosed as social anxiety disorder, obsessive–compulsive disorder, major depressive disorder, or social phobia. Social anxiety disorder and BDD are highly comorbid (within those with BDD, 12–68.8% also have SAD; within those with SAD, 4.8-12% also have BDD), developing similarly in patients -BDD is even classified as a subset of SAD by some researchers. Correct diagnosis can depend on specialized questioning and correlation with emotional distress or social dysfunction. Estimates place the Body Dysmorphic Disorder Questionnaire's sensitivity at 100% (0% false negatives) and specificity at 92.5% (7.5% false positives). BDD is also comorbid with eating disorders, up to 12% comorbidity in one study. Both eating and body dysmorphic disorders are concerned with physical appearance, but eating disorders tend to focus more on weight rather than one's general appearance.

BDD is classified as an obsessive–compulsive disorder in DSM-5. It is important to treat people with BDD as soon as possible because the person may have already been suffering for an extended period of time and as BDD has a high suicide rate, at 2–12 times higher than the national average.

=== Comorbidity ===
BDD is frequently comorbid with anxiety, depression, psychotic, or bipolar spectrum disorders. BDD is particularly associated with anxiety disorders, especially social anxiety disorder, as individuals often fear being judged for their appearance and avoid social interactions. BDD also frequently coexists with depression, with feelings of sadness and hopelessness often arising when obsessing over perceived flaws, sometimes leading to suicidal ideation and the development of MDD.

Although, OCD compulsions can be more varied, BDD-related compulsions typically are centered around appearance, which is what led to its inclusion within the obsessive-compulsive spectrum in the DSM-5 (American Psychiatric Association, 2013). Anorexia nervosa and bulimia nervosa are eating disorders which are commonly observed in individuals with BDD, as altered body image concerns lead to disordered eating behaviors in an attempt to alter perceived flaws.

== Treatment ==
=== Medication and psychotherapy ===
Anti-depressant medication, such as selective serotonin reuptake inhibitors (SSRIs), and cognitive-behavioral therapy (CBT) are considered effective. SSRIs can help relieve obsessive–compulsive and delusional traits, while cognitive-behavioral therapy can help patients recognize faulty thought patterns. A study was done by Dr. Sabine Wilhelm where she and her colleagues created and tested a treatment manual specializing in BDD symptoms that resulted in improved symptoms with no asymptomatic decline. Core treatment elements include psychoeducation and case formulation, cognitive restructuring, exposure and ritual prevention and mindfulness/perceptual retraining. Before treatment, it can help to provide psychoeducation, as with self-help books and support websites.

=== Self-improvement ===
For many people with BDD, cosmetic surgery does not work to alleviate the symptoms of BDD as their opinion of their appearance is not grounded in reality. It is recommended that cosmetic surgeons and psychiatrists work together in order to screen surgery patients to see if they have BDD, as the results of the surgery could be harmful for them.

== History ==
In 1886, Enrico Morselli reported a disorder that he termed dysmorphophobia, which described the disorder as a feeling of being ugly even though there does not appear to be anything wrong with the person's appearance. In 1980, the American Psychiatric Association recognized the disorder, while categorizing it as an atypical somatoform disorder, in the third edition of its Diagnostic and Statistical Manual of Mental Disorders (DSM). Classifying it as a distinct somatoform disorder, the DSM-III's 1987 revision switched the term to body dysmorphic disorder.

Published in 1994, DSM-IV defines BDD as a preoccupation with an imagined or trivial defect in appearance, a preoccupation causing social or occupational dysfunction, and not better explained as another disorder, such as anorexia nervosa. Published in 2013, the DSM-5 shifts BDD to a new category (obsessive–compulsive spectrum), adds operational criteria (such as repetitive behaviors or intrusive thoughts), and notes the subtype muscle dysmorphia (preoccupation that one's body is too small or insufficiently muscular or lean).

The term "dysmorphic" is derived from the Greek word, 'dusmorphíā' – the prefix 'dys-' meaning abnormal or apart, and 'morphḗ' meaning shape. Morselli described people who felt a subjective feeling of ugliness as people who were tormented by a physical deficit. Sigmund Freud (1856–1939), once called one of his patients, a Russian aristocrat named Sergei Pankejeff, "Wolf Man," as he was experiencing classical symptoms of BDD.

== See also ==
- Body integrity dysphoria – Mental disorder characterized by a desire to be physically disabled
- Muscle dysmorphia – Subtype of the body dysmorphic disorder
