= Three-Factor Eating Questionnaire =

Eating behaviour screening tool

The Three-Factor Eating Questionnaire (abbreviated as TFEQ) is a questionnaire often applied in food intake-behavior related research. It goes back to its publication in 1985 by Albert J. Stunkard and Samuel Messick.

The TFEQ contains 51 items (questions) and measures three dimensions of human eating behavior:

- 'cognitive restraint of eating' (Factor I – 21 items)
- 'disinhibition' (Factor II – 16 items)
- 'hunger' (Factor III – 14 items)

Each item scores either 0 or 1 point. The minimum score for factors I-II-III is therefore 0-0-0, the possible maximum score 21-16-14. There exist revised versions of this scale with reduced numbers of items: the TFEQ-R18 with 18 items and the TFEQ-R21 with 21 items.

== See also ==
- Binge Eating Scale
- Body Attitudes Test
- Body Attitudes Questionnaire
- Diagnostic classification and rating scales used in psychiatry
- Eating Disorder Inventory
- Eating Disorder Diagnostic Scale
- Eating Disorder Examination Interview
- Eating Attitudes Test
- SCOFF questionnaire
