= Anorectic Behavior Observation Scale =

Eating disorder questionnaire

The Anorectic Behavior Observation Scale (ABOS) is a thirty-item diagnostic questionnaire devised to be answered by the parents, spouse or other family member of an individual suspected of having an eating disorder. It was developed by Vandereyken et al. in 1992. The ABOS is useful for evaluations of patients with anorexia nervosa (AN) and bulimia nervosa (BN) before, during, and after clinical treatments. It can also be a significant tool for the screening of subjects in early-stage ED.

The validity and reliability of the ABOS have been confirmed by Vandereycken, and the scale shows good internal consistency with Cronbach's α of .81.

== Background ==
Gathering data from parents and caregivers is extremely important because patients with ED often tend to deny or minimize their disorder. The early stage of ED is often not immediately identifiable by the relatives, as the first signals can be misinterpreted as a form of self-control or willpower. People with ED, indeed, tend to adopt secret attitudes, hiding eating behaviours and body shape. That is the reason why a detailed observation of the patient by their caregivers is crucial in the early stage of the disorder.

== Scoring and structure ==
The ABOS consists of 30 items with three possible answers provided per question: "yes" (2 points), "no" (0 points), and "don't know" (1 point). The caregivers should base their rating of the 30 items on observations of the patient during the past month. The score ranges from 0 to 60, with a higher score indicating a higher level of pathology, and the cut-off point is 21.

The questions address three factors:

- Factor 1: Eating behaviour, concern with weight and food, denial of problems
- Factor 2: Bulimic-like behaviour, including bingeing, disposing, furtive eating and purging, and talking about thinness and dieting
- Factor 3: Hyperactivity, eating slowly, chopping food into small pieces.

Cross-cultural differences have been noticed with regard to the content of each factor.

== Limitations ==
The ABOS is a strong tool in the diagnosis of patients with ED, but there are some limitations to consider.

The first main issue has to do with the objectivity of the ABOS. The information provided by the informant with regard to the suspected patient can be influenced by several factors, such as the context or the implicit characteristics of both the parent and the subject. For instance, intra-family conflicts or complex parent-child relationships can impact the information provided by the caregivers. The psychopathology of the parents can also be a misleading factor, especially if they have anxiety and depression.

A second key issue concerns the ABOS as a measurement system. The scale, in fact, indicates the absence or presence of a certain behaviour, but it does not address the frequency of the observed behaviour.

Other issues have emerged from the samples of the studies, in particular with regard to cross-cultural differences. Slightly distinct behaviours, indeed, have been noticed across countries. Consequently, a larger randomizing sample comprehensive of patients from different countries is needed in order to make reliable generalizations.

Evidently, considering the abovementioned limitation, the ABOS should be used together with self-report questionnaires and interviews that assess the patient directly.

== German ==
=== Sample ===
The validity of the German-language version of ABOS was tested with 101 females, in- and outpatients recruited from the Department of Child and Adolescent Psychiatry, Psychosomatics and Psychotherapy, Charité Berlin. Sixty-three patients had AN restricting subtype (ANR), 17 from AN binge-purge subtype (ANBP), and 21 from BN. All ED patients met the DSM-IV criteria for ED and were aged between 12 and 18 years. A control group of 134 people with matching age and socio-economic backgrounds completed the ABOS, which was translated into German by an independent translator.

=== Data analysis ===
Two analyses were conducted to evaluate the scale. Firstly, internal consistency was tested using Cronbach's alpha; secondly, confirmatory factor analysis was conducted to test whether the German data fitted the original version by Vandereycken.

=== Conclusions ===
The results reported a high internal consistency for the total sample and confirmed that the original model fits the German data well. Consequently, the German-language version can be a valid and reliable tool in the diagnosis of eating disorders.

== Japanese ==
=== Sample ===
The validity of the Japanese-language version of ABOS was tested with 102 family members of eating disorder patients, completing the questionnaire. The patients were 80 females and one male, who came out of clinics for the first time. Among them, 21 patients had AN restrictive type (ANR), 42 had AN binge-purge subtype (ANBP), 12 had BN, and 6 had not-specified ED. All ED patients met the DSM-IV criteria for ED and the mean age of patients was 20.8. The questionnaire was translated into Japanese by the back-translation method.

=== Data analysis ===
Two analyses where conducted to test the data. Firstly, a Scree test was applied to determine the number of factors in the Japanese sample; secondly, a confirmatory factor analysis was conducted to observe whether the Japanese data fitted the original version of the ABOS.

=== Conclusions ===
The results illustrated that the original three-factor model fits the Japanese data well. Consequently, the Japanese-language version of the ABOS can be a useful tool in the diagnosis of eating disorders.

However, cross-cultural differences were noted as compared to the original version with regard to the content of each factor. For instance, chopping food in small pieces is not considered a pathological behaviour in Japan because of the ordinary use of chopsticks.

== Spanish ==
=== Sample ===
The validity of the Spanish-language version of the ABOS was tested with 239 caregivers of 143 outpatients diagnosed with and treated for an ED in the Eating Disorders Outpatient Clinic of the Psychiatric Services at the Galdakao-Usansolo Hospital and the Ortuella Mental Health Centre in Bizkaia, Spain. Patients were aged between 16 and 65 and they had AN or BN, according to the DSM-IV criteria. Socio-demographic data were gathered from both the patients and the caregivers and the ABOS was translated into Spanish. Moreover, in the Spanish version, the caregivers also completed the ABOS after 1 year, to observe the changes in the patients' ED over time.

=== Data analysis ===
Three analyses were conducted to test the data. Firstly, a confirmatory factor analysis tested whether the Spanish data fitted the original model; secondly, a Scree test was assessed to determine the number of factors; thirdly, Cronbach's alpha coefficients were computed to evaluate internal consistency. Furthermore, after one year, the newly completed ABOS was compared to the initial one.

=== Conclusions ===
The results showed that the original version fitted the Spanish data well, the three-factor model was confirmed as the most suitable, and the Cronbach's alpha coefficients confirmed internal consistency. In addition, the comparison with the ABOS completed one year later illustrated non-significant changes. A longer follow-up period might therefore be needed.

Overall, however, the Spanish-language version of the ABOS can be a useful tool in the diagnosis of eating disorders.

== EAQP ==
The Eating and Activity Questionnaire for Parents (EAQP) is a short form of the ABOS utilizing 10 items from the original version. It was designed to solve some psychometric issues that had been identified in the ABOS, with regard to variance and distribution. The EAQP reflects the three-factor structure of the ABOS, but the third factor has been changed from "Hyperactivity" to "Level of activity/fitness".

The EAQP is utilized as a screening tool of parents' assessment of their child's eating behavior.

== See also ==
- Binge Eating Scale
- Body Attitudes Test
- Body Attitudes Questionnaire
- Diagnostic classification and rating scales used in psychiatry
- Eating Attitudes Test
- Eating Disorder Inventory
- SCOFF questionnaire
