= Minnesota Eating Behavior Survey =

- Purpose: assessment of eating disorder

The Minnesota Eating Behavior Survey (MEBS) is a 30 item self-report questionnaire used to assess the presence of an eating disorder. It is designed for use with both male and females age 10 to adult. The MEBS was originally designed for use by McGue et al. in the Minnesota Twin Family Study (MTFS) a longitudinal study to assess the onset of psychological pathology including eating disorders among 1,400 twin girls and their parents.

The MEBS includes items taken from the Eating Disorder Inventory (Garner et al. 1983) rewritten in a simpler manner.

== Scoring ==
The MEBS provides a total score based on four subscales; Body Dissatisfaction, Weight Preoccupation, Binge Eating and Compensatory Behavior.

== See also ==
- Body Attitudes Questionnaire
- Body Attitudes Test
- Eating Attitudes Test
- Eating Disorder Examination Interview
- Eating Disorder Inventory
- SCOFF questionnaire
