= Bulimia Test-Revised =

- Purpose: assess presence of bulimia

The Bulimia Test-Revised (BULIT-R) is a 36 item self-report questionnaire to assess the presence of bulimic symptoms. It was devised by Thelen et al. in 1991 the first version was devised by Thelen et al. in 1984. The test has been validated for use in both males and females.

== Scoring ==
The BULIT-R contains 36 multiple choice questions with five possible responses, 28 of which factor into the total score, questions 6,11, 19, 20, 27, 29, 31 and 36 are not scored. Items 2,5,7,8,10, 12, 13, 14, 15, 16, 17, 21, 23, 26, 28, 30, 32, 35 are reversed scored. Scores range from 29 to 140 with those greater than 104 being indicative of bulimia nervosa.

== See also ==
- Body Attitudes Questionnaire
- Eating Attitudes Test
- Eating Disorder Examination Interview
- Eating Disorder Inventory
- SCOFF questionnaire
