= Night Eating Questionnaire =

Measure to assess symptoms of night eating syndrome

The Night Eating Questionnaire (NEQ) is one of the most widely used measures for the assessment of night eating syndrome. The original NEQ was revised several times and its current version was published by Allison and colleagues in 2008. The NEQ has 14 items and responses are recorded on a five-point scale from 0 to 4 with each item having different response labels. Additional items for assessing perceived distress and functional impairment can be used but these are not included in the total score.

== Scoring ==
The NEQ assesses four aspects of night eating syndrome: morning anorexia, evening hyperphagia, mood/sleep, and nocturnal ingestions. Items 1, 4, and 14 are inversely coded, that is, need to be recoded as 0=4, 1=3, 3=1, and 4=0 before computing subscale or total scores. Item 7 includes an additional response option "My mood does not change during the day." which, if selected, is coded with 0. There are two stop criteria: If respondents answer item 9 or item 12 with 0 (never), then all subsequent items are scored as 0. Item 13 asks about nocturnal sleep-related eating disorder and is not included in the total score. Thus, total scores are calculated by adding responses to items 1 to 12 and item 14, so they can range between 0 and 52.

== Interpretation ==
Higher total scores indicate higher night eating syndrome symptomatology. Two cut-off scores have been proposed, a score of 25 has high sensitivity and a score of 30 has high specificity. As the NEQ is intended as a screening measure, the use of diagnostic interviews is recommended to validate a diagnosis of night eating syndrome.

== Reliability ==
The NEQ has acceptable internal reliability (Cronbach's alpha = 0.70) and test–retest reliability (r = 0.77–0.86 across 2–3 weeks).

== Validity ==
Convergent validity has been supported by medium-to-large positive correlations with other measures that assess eating pathology and with food intake after 6 p.m. as assessed with a food diary across 7 days. Discriminant validity has been supported by absent or small correlations with other relevant (but not eating-related) constructs such as morningness–eveningness preference.

== Translated versions ==
The NEQ has been used in several other languages such as Portuguese, Spanish, Hebrew, Arabic, German, Chinese, Italian, French, and Korean

== Modified versions ==
Versions of the NEQ for children and adolescents have been developed.

== Comparison with other measures ==
The NEQ assesses symptoms over an unspecified duration and is meant to screen for night eating symptoms broadly. The Night Eating Symptom Scale is similar to the NEQ but assesses symptoms over the previous 7 days and is meant to be used to monitor progress in treatment. The Night Eating Diagnostic Questionnaire is intended to establish a diagnosis of night eating syndrome rather than to assess a person's symptom severity. In addition to these self-report instruments, the Night Eating Syndrome History and Inventory is a semistructured clinical interview that is used to establish a diagnosis of night eating syndrome in addition to gathering information on symptom severity, distress and impaired functioning due to night eating, and precipitating factors.
