= Disordered eating =

Set of behaviors

Disordered eating describes a variety of abnormal eating behaviors that, by themselves, do not warrant diagnosis of an eating disorder.

Disordered eating includes behaviors that are common features of eating disorders, such as:

- Chronic restrained eating
- Compulsive eating
- Binge eating, with associated loss of control
- Self-induced vomiting

Disordered eating also includes behaviors that are not characteristic of a specific eating disorder, such as:

- Irregular, chaotic eating patterns
- Ignoring physical feelings of hunger and satiety (fullness)
- Use of diet pills
- Emotional eating
- Night eating
- Secretive food concocting: the consumption of embarrassing food combinations, such as mashed potatoes mixed with sandwich cookies. See also Food craving § Pregnancy and Nocturnal sleep-related eating disorder § Symptoms and behaviors

== Potential causes of disordered eating ==
Disordered eating can represent a change in eating patterns caused by other mental disorders (e.g. clinical depression), or by factors that are generally considered to be unrelated to mental disorders (e.g. extreme homesickness).

Certain factors among adolescents tend to be associated with disordered eating, including perceived pressure from parents and peers, nuclear family dynamic, body mass index, negative affect (mood), self-esteem, perfectionism, drug use, and participation in sports that focus on leanness. These factors are similar among boys and girls alike. However, the reported incidence rates of disordered eating are consistently and significantly higher in female than male participants. 61% of females and 28% of males reported disordered eating behaviors in a study of over 1,600 adolescents.

=== Nuclear family environment ===
The nuclear family dynamic of an adolescent plays a large part in the formation of their psychological, and thus behavioral, development. A research article published in the Journal of Adolescence concluded that, “…while families do not appear to play a primary causal role in eating pathology, dysfunctional family environments and unhealthy parenting can affect the genesis and maintenance of disordered eating.”

One study explored the connection between the disordered eating patterns of adolescents and the poor socioemotional coping mechanisms of guardians with mental disorders. It was found that in homes of parents with mental health issues (such as depression or anxiety), the children living in these environments self-reported experiencing stressful home environments, parental withdrawal, rejection, unfulfilled emotional needs, or over-involvement from their guardians. It was hypothesized that this was directly related to adolescent study participants also reporting poor emotional awareness, expression, and regulation in relation to internalized/externalized eating disordered habits. Parental anxiety/depression could not be directly linked to disordered eating, but could be linked to the development of poor coping skills that can lead to disordered eating behaviors.

Another study specifically investigated whether a parental's eating disorder could predict disordered eating in their children. It was found that rates of eating disorder appearances in children with either parent having a history of an eating disorder were much higher than those with parents without an eating disorder. Reported disordered eating peaked between ages 15 and 17 with the risk of eating disorder occurrences in females 12.7 times greater than of that in males. This is, "of particular interest as it has been shown that maternal ED [eating disorders] predict disordered eating behaviour in their daughters." This suggests that poor eating habits result as a coping mechanism for other direct issues presented by an unstable home environment.

=== Social stresses ===
Additional stress from outside the home environment influence disordered eating characteristics. Social stresses from peer environments, such as feeling out of place or discriminated against, has been shown to increase feelings of body shame and social anxiety in studies of minority groups that lead to a prevalence of disordered eating.

A study published in the International Journal of Eating Disorders used data from the Massachusetts Youth Risk Behavior Surveys from 1999 to 2013 to examine how disordered eating has trended in heterosexual versus LGB (lesbian, gay, bisexual) youth. The data from over 26,000 surveys investigated the practices of purging, fasting, and using diet pills. It was found that, "sexual minority youth report disproportionately higher prevalence of disordered eating compared to heterosexual peers: up to 1 in 4 sexual minority youth report…patterns of disordered eating…" In addition, the gap between the number of LGB females and heterosexual females controlling weight in unhealthy ways has continued to widen.

The concept this study proposed to explain this disparity comes from the minority stress theory. This states that unhealthy behaviors are directly related to the distal stress, or social stress, that minorities experience. These stressors could include rejection or pressure by peers, and physical, mental, and emotional harassment.

A study published in Psychology of Women Quarterly explored the connection between social anxiety stresses and eating disordered habits more in depth in women in the LGBTQ community who were also racial minorities. Over 450 women ranked their interactions with everyday discrimination, their LGBTQ identity, social anxiety, their objectified body consciousness, and an eating disorder inventory diagnostic scale. The findings of the compilation of survey responses indicated that increased discrimination led to proximal minority stress, leading to feelings of social anxiety and body shame, which could be directly associated with binge eating, bulimia, and other signs of disordered eating. It has also been suggested that being a “double” or “triple” minority who experiences discrimination towards multiple characteristics contributes to more intense psychological distress and maladaptive coping mechanisms.

=== Athletic influences ===
Disordered eating among athletes, particularly female athletes, has been the subject of much research. In one study, women with disordered eating were 3.6 times as likely to have an eating disorder if they were athletes. In addition, female collegiate athletes who compete in heavily body-conscious sports like gymnastics, swimming, or diving are shown to be more at risk for developing an eating disorder. This is a result of the engagement in sports where weekly repeated weigh-ins are standard, and usually required by coaches.

A study published in Eating Behaviors examined the pressure of mandated weigh-ins on female collegiate athletes and how that pressure was dealt with in terms of weight management. After analyzing over 400 survey responses, it was found that athletes reported increased uses of diet pills/laxatives, consuming less calories than needed for their sport, and following nutrition information from unqualified sources. 75% of the weighed athletes reported using a weight-management method such as restricting food intake, increasing exercise, eating low fat foods, taking laxatives, vomiting, and other.

These habits were found to be worse in athletes that were weighed in front of their peers than those weighed in private. In addition, especially in gymnasts, preoccupation and anxiety about gaining weight and being weighed, and viewing food as the enemy were prevalent mindsets. This harmful mindset continued even after the gymnasts were retired from their sport: "Although retired, these gymnasts were still afraid to step onto a scale, were anxious about gaining weight…suggesting that the negative effects of being weighed can linger…[and] suggest[ing] that the weight/ fitness requirements acted as a socio-cultural pressure that would substantially increase the women’s risk of developing an eating disorder in the future."

Disordered eating, along with amenorrhea and bone demineralization, form what clinicians refer to as the female athletic triad, or FAT. In contribution to these eating disorders that these female athletes develop, Results in the lack of nutrition. This can lead to the loss of several or more consecutive periods which then leads to calcium and bone loss, putting the athlete at great risk of fracturing bones and damaging tissues. Each of these conditions is a medical concern as they create serious health risks that may be life-threatening to the individual. While any female athlete can develop the triad, adolescent girls are considered most at risk because of the active biological changes and growth spurts that they experience, rapidly changing life circumstances that are observed within the teenage years, and peer and social pressures.

=== Social media ===
Researchers have said the most pervasive and influential factor controlling body image perception is the mass media. One study examined the impact of celebrity and peer Instagram images on women's body image as, “comparisons will be most readily made with individuals who are perceived as being similar” to the target as there is more of a relationship between the two parties. The participants in this study, 138 female undergraduate students ages 18–30, were shown 15 images each of attractive celebrities, attractive unknown peers, and travel destinations. The participant's reactions were observed and visual scales were used to measure mood and dissatisfaction before and after viewing the images. The findings of this experiment determined that negative mood and body dissatisfaction rankings were greater after being exposed to the celebrity and peer images, with no difference between celebrity versus peer images. The media is especially dangerous for females at risk for developing body image issues, and disordered eating, because the sheer number of possible comparisons become larger. Nutrition fraud has also become prevalent on social media, with some users spreading "misleading claims for food and nutrition products. These products can include traditional foods, dietary supplements, dietary products, food substances, diet plans and devices." This can lead to those influenced at a greater risk for developing body image issues, or disordered eating. With many looking to the internet for nutrition and medical help, the large amount of false information circulating on platforms is very concerning for users.

== See also ==
- Night eating syndrome
- Overeaters Anonymous
