= Scoff =

Scoff or SCOFF may refer to:

- Scoff, a colloquial term for the act of eating, usually quickly
- "Scoff" a song by Nirvana on their album Bleach
- Scoff, a colloquial term for fellatio
- SCOFF questionnaire, a questionnaire for screening eating disorders
- Scoff, to express disgust or dismay at someone's bad behaviour or something else dismaying
