= Diabulimia =

Eating disorder for people with diabetes

- Other names: ED-DMT1, eating disorder-diabetes mellitus type 1, type 1 eating disorder
- Specialty: Psychiatry
- Symptoms: restricting insulin, hyperglycaemia, diabetic ketoacidosis
- Complications: hyperglycaemia, diabetic ketoacidosis, other symptoms of hyperglycaemia
- Duration: variable, can last years
- Causes: body dysmorphia
- Risk factors: existing eating disorder (such as anorexia nervosa or bulimia nervosa)
- Differential diagnosis: type 1 diabetes without an eating disorder
- Treatment: cognitive behavioural therapy
- Prognosis: reduced life expectancy
- Frequency: 40% of men and 20% of women with type 1 diabetes
- Deaths: on the increase

Diabulimia (a portmanteau of diabetes and bulimia), also known as ED-DMT1 (eating disorder-diabetes mellitus type 1) in the US or T1ED (type 1 eating disorder) in the UK, is an eating disorder in which people with type 1 diabetes deliberately give themselves less insulin than they need or stop taking it altogether for the purpose of weight loss. Diabulimia is not recognized as a formal psychiatric diagnosis in the DSM-5. Because of this, some in the medical or psychiatric communities use the phrases "disturbed eating behavior" or "disordered eating behavior" (DEB in both cases) and disordered eating (DE) are quite common in medical and psychiatric literature addressing patients who have type 1 diabetes and manipulate insulin doses to control weight along with exhibiting bulimic behavior.

Diabulimia is caused by a range of factors relating to body image, the regular use of insulin, and emotional well-being. Insulin can cause weight gain, and a person who restricts insulin may lose weight. Insulin restriction can lead to the common symptoms of uncontrolled hyperglycemia, which risks complications and a shorter life expectancy. Treatment involves cognitive behavioral therapy, and other support services offered by a multidisciplinary team who work both in diabetes medicine and on eating disorders.

Diabulimia is most common in young people, and most of the severe cases tend to occur in women. Research into effective management strategies is ongoing, with a growing medical consensus on the importance of early intervention with specialist teams. People with diabulimia often suffer both from clinicians and from friends and family, partly due to the lack of understanding of the condition.

== Signs and symptoms ==
A person with diabulimia, especially if not treated early, can result in negative effects on the body. Of diabetics who have a DEB, some intentionally misuse insulin to control weight. This may also involve irregular eating patterns.

Suspension of insulin combined with overeating can result in ketoacidosis. Multiple hospitalizations for ketoacidosis or hyperglycemia are cues to screen for an underlying emotional conflict.

=== Short term ===
The short-term symptoms of diabulimia are:

- Frequent and excessive urination
- Frequent and excessive thirst
- Frequent and excessive hunger
- High blood glucose levels (often over 600 mg/dL or 33 mmol/L)
- Weakness
- Fatigue
- Large amounts of glucose in the urine (glycosuria)
- Inability to concentrate
- Electrolyte disturbance
- Severe ketonuria, and, in DKA, severe ketonemia
- Low sodium levels

=== Medium term ===
These are the medium-term symptoms of diabulimia. They are prevalent when diabulimia has not been treated and hence also include the short-term symptoms.

- Muscle atrophy
- GERD
- Indigestion
- Severe weight loss
- Proteinuria
- Moderate to severe dehydration
- Edema with fluid replacement
- High cholesterol
- A1c of 9.0 or higher

=== Long term ===
If a person with type 1 diabetes who has diabulimia has the disease for more than a short time—usually due to alternating phases during which insulin is injected properly and relapses during which they have diabulimia—then the following longer-term symptoms can be expected:

- Delayed puberty (and dysmenorrhoea or amenorrhoea in women) in young people
- Severe kidney damage: high blood sugar can overwork the kidneys, eventually leading to kidney failure and the need for a kidney transplant
- Severe neuropathy (nerve damage to hands and feet)
- Extreme fatigue
- Edema (during blood sugars controlled phases)
- Heart problems
- Retinal damage and subsequent vision problems
- High cholesterol (hypercholesterolaemia)
- Osteoporosis
- Death

== Causes ==
=== Diabulimia ===
Diabulimia is caused by a range of factors relating to body image, the regular use of insulin, and emotional well-being. The long-term management of type 1 diabetes often involves dietary restrictions for control of blood sugar level, which can raise a negative attention to diet. There is often a focus on the fact that insulin can cause weight gain, and that not using insulin can cause weight loss. For example, a person with type 1 diabetes may have experienced weight loss before the diagnosis, followed by weight gain when beginning treatment with insulin. This may lead to increased body dissatisfaction and preoccupation with weight loss. This increases the risk of eating disorders such as anorexia nervosa and bulimia nervosa. The vast majority of people with diabulimia are aware of the negative side effects that hyperglycemia can cause.

Skipping insulin can lead to weight loss without side effects at first, but the risk of side effects gets progressively worse - by this time, it is more difficult to change behavior. Weight gain can cause individuals to fear insulin as it is often seen as the root of their low self-esteem. Low self-esteem can lead to depression or anxiety about body image that contributes to difficulty with diabetes management.

Often, individuals often think diabulimia is less common than it is and do not know how difficult it is to overcome. Unlike vomiting or starving, there is sometimes no clear action or willpower involved. Often, individuals will refuse to believe in the diagnosis or the long-term effects.

== Prognosis ==
Diabulimia appears to lower life expectancy compared to other patients with type 1 diabetes, with the mean age of death around 45 (13 years lower than that for type 1 diabetes without an eating disorder). This reduced life expectancy is correlated with the severity of eating disorder behaviors.

== Treatment ==
Treatment for diabulimia has two goals: stabilizing diabetes by increasing insulin intake and addressing the underlying eating disorder. The standard approach for the treatment of two complex conditions involves a multidisciplinary team of professionals. This team may include an endocrinologist, a psychiatrist, a psychologist, and a dietician.

There are several treatment centers in the United States that have programs specifically designed for the co-morbidity of diabetes and eating disorders. There is one non-profit in the U.S. devoted to the education, support, and advocacy for people with diabetes and eating disorders. DBH runs a 24 hour toll-free crisis hotline +1.425.985.364 open 365 days a year.

=== Eating Disorder ===
To address the underlying eating disorder psychosocial interventions such as cognitive behavioral therapy, motivational therapy, problem-solving therapy, coping skills training, and family behavior therapy have all been shown to improve treatment adherence and achieve good glycemic control. It has been observed that addressing psychological needs improves HbA1c by 0.5%–1% in adults with T2DM. Useful therapies may involve cognitive behavioral therapy. Cognitive behavioral therapy focuses on changing unhealthy thinking surrounding the use of insulin.

Family involvement and family therapy is helpful for long-term maintenance of good behaviors with taking insulin. A positive mindset to recovery, and connection with others who have experienced diabulimia, increases the probability of successful recovery.

=== Insulin ===
Individuals diagnosed with type 1 diabetes typically need to administer insulin on a daily basis, frequently four to five injections throughout the day. The methods of insulin injection vary, including the use of a syringe and needle, an insulin delivery pen, or an insulin pump.

Finding the optimal insulin dose to effectively lower one's blood glucose to the desired levels may take some time, even with the assistance of healthcare professionals. This process involves careful adjustment and monitoring to achieve the best outcomes for managing diabetes.

Even with treatment, relapse is common (some estimate over 50% relapse within six years), requiring long-term reassessment for early intervention.

== Epidemiology ==
Diabulimia is most common in women, and in people between 15 and 30 years old. Around 40% of men with type 1 diabetes may have skipped insulin injection at least once, and around 20% of women. Some studies have found that up to 60% of people with type 1 diabetes deliberately restrict insulin at some point.

Many articles and studies further conclude that diabetic females have, on average, higher body mass index (BMI) than their nondiabetic counterparts. Girls and young adult women with higher BMIs are also shown to be more likely to have disordered eating behavior (DEB). Many authoritative articles show that preteen and teenage girls with type 1 diabetes have significantly higher rates of eating disorders of all types than do girls without diabetes.

== History ==
Diabulimia is not currently recognised in the DSM-5. Current diagnoses are based on the idea of insulin restriction being a feature of existing anorexia nervosa and bulimia nervosa. Diabulimia is gaining notability within scientific research. In 2019, NHS England began trialling specialist diabulimia clinics. Whilst access to eating disorder clinics is improving, access to specialist diabulimia services is not widely available.

== Society and culture ==
A lack of recognition of diabulimia by clinicians leads to generally negative medical interactions. There is also a lack of public awareness. A lack of medical understanding creates social stigma. Because diabulimia tends not to involve significant eating restriction like anorexia nervosa, or purging as in bulimia nervosa, some do not recognise the significance of diabulimia. A BBC documentary in 2017 caused a significant increase in requests for specialist medical training for diabulimia, and improved public awareness.

== See also ==
- Diabetes mellitus
- Bulimia nervosa
- Eating disorder
