= Freshman 15 =

Weight gained during first year at university

The term "Freshman 15" is an expression commonly used in the United States and Canada to refer to weight gain during a student's first year of college. Although the "fifteen" refers to a 15 lb (6.8 kg) weight gain, the expression can apply to weight gain in general. In Australia and New Zealand it is sometimes referred to as "First Year Fatties", "Fresher Spread", or "Fresher Five", the latter referring to a gain of 5 kg (11 lb).

Despite the term's popularity, research has consistently found that the typical first-year gain is far smaller than fifteen pounds: most studies converge on an average of roughly 2 to 4 lb (0.9 to 1.8 kg), and only about 5 to 10 percent of students actually gain fifteen pounds or more during the first year. Accordingly, reviewers have frequently characterized the "Freshman 15" as a media-driven health myth, while still noting that the first year of university is a genuine period of vulnerability for rapid, modest weight gain and for the establishment of long-term diet and exercise habits.

== Origin and usage of the term ==
The earliest known print use of the phrase dates to the August 1989 issue of Seventeen magazine, which carried the cover line "Fighting the Freshman 15". The alliterative phrase was quickly taken up by other media outlets through the 1990s, and became the subject of numerous advice articles, campus wellness campaigns, and orientation materials aimed at incoming students. Variations such as the "Freshman 5" and "Freshman 10" emerged alongside it, reflecting both regional usage and growing skepticism about the fifteen-pound figure.

A 2008 systematic review of the phrase's "information trail", published in the Health Information and Libraries Journal, traced how the claim circulated between the popular press and the research literature—each citing the other—and concluded that the fifteen-pound figure had persisted largely despite, rather than because of, the available evidence.

== Research findings ==
Actual measured gains have consistently fallen well short of fifteen pounds. Research into the subject has shown that on average, a college student gains from 2 to 3 lb (0.9 to 1.4 kg) of weight during the first year.

- One of the earliest investigations, a 1985 study by Melbourne Hovell and colleagues following university women over three years, found that students were at greater risk of excess weight gain than a matched community sample of non-students—suggesting that the college environment itself promotes gain, even though the absolute amounts are modest.
- A study that weighed 60 first-year students at Cornell University during their first week and again twelve weeks later found a mean gain of 1.9 kg (4.2 lb), among the larger estimates in the literature; the researchers calculated that this corresponded to a daily energy surplus of only about 174 kcal.
- Nicole L. Mihalopoulos and colleagues at a private university in the Northeastern United States followed 125 first-year students (average age 18.4) living on campus: about half gained weight, 15 percent lost weight, and only 5 percent gained fifteen pounds or more.
- A 2009 meta-analysis by Rachel Vella-Zarb and Frank Elgar, pooling 24 studies and 3,401 participants published between 1985 and 2008, estimated a mean gain of 3.86 lb (1.75 kg). Potential contributors to gain included recent dieting, high baseline body weight, and psychological stress—prompting the paper's wry title, "The 'Freshman 5'".
- A larger 2015 meta-analysis (22 studies, 5,549 students, several countries) found a pooled mean gain of 1.36 kg (3.0 lb) over roughly the first five months; 60.9 percent of students gained weight, those who gained averaged 3.38 kg (7.5 lb), about 9.3 percent gained at least 15 lb (6.8 kg), and most of the gain occurred in the first term.

=== The Ohio State University national study ===
The largest investigation of the claim used data from 7,418 young people participating in the U.S. National Longitudinal Survey of Youth 1997. Jay Zagorsky of Ohio State University's Center for Human Resource Research and Patricia Smith of the University of Michigan–Dearborn found that women gained an average of 2.4 lb (1.1 kg) and men an average of 3.4 lb (1.5 kg) in the freshman year; no more than 10 percent of freshmen gained fifteen pounds or more, and a quarter of freshmen actually lost weight. The gain was only about a half-pound (around 200 grams) more than that of same-aged peers who were not in college, and of all the factors examined—dormitory living, full-time enrollment, institutional type, and drinking patterns—only heavy drinking (six or more drinks on at least four days per month) was significantly associated with extra weight, and even then it accounted for less than a pound of additional gain. "The 'freshman 15' is a media myth," Zagorsky said. "It is not college that leads to weight gain—it is becoming a young adult." The researchers also cautioned that uncritical repetition of the phrase, "even if it is being used just as a catchy, alliterative figure of speech, may contribute to the perception of being overweight, especially among young women".

== Presumed causes ==
Proposed causes of first-year weight gain include increased alcohol intake, consumption of fat- and carbohydrate-rich foods, malnutrition, stress, disrupted sleep, and decreased levels of exercise, often interacting in an environment of newfound independence from parental oversight.

=== Dining halls ===
Buffet-style, all-you-can-eat dining facilities are the most frequently blamed environmental factor. In the Cornell study described above, regression models fitted to students' behavioral questionnaires attributed about 20 percent of the variance in weight gain to eating in the all-you-can-eat dining halls, with snacking and high-fat "junk food" consumption accounting for another 20 percent; a second model incorporating initial weight attributed 47 percent of the variance to junk-food intake, meal frequency, and number of snacks. Evening snacking, weekend meals, and recent dieting (since dieters tend to regain weight) also predicted gain. Nutritionists note that a sustained surplus as small as 100–200 kcal per day—roughly a soft drink or a dessert serving—is sufficient to explain typical first-semester gains.

=== Alcohol consumption ===
Alcohol contributes to weight gain directly and indirectly. Alcoholic drinks are calorically dense—an average beer contains roughly 150 kcal, so five beers supply around 750 kcal, about a third of a day's energy requirement, before any accompanying food is counted—and regular drinking reliably adds excess calories. The Ohio State national study identified heavy episodic drinking as the only behavioral factor significantly associated with freshman weight gain. Surveys suggest students involved in fraternities and sororities tend to have the highest alcohol-consumption rates on campus, and about one in four college students report academic consequences from drinking, including missing classes, falling behind, and receiving lower grades.

Researchers have found that people who consumed drinks of higher alcohol strength ate significantly more than others, preferring fatty and salty foods, and reported stronger urges to snack. A 2018 study of 286 students at a large public university in the Midwest dubbed this pattern the "drunchies" (drunk munchies): on drinking nights, students were far more likely to eat before bed, overwhelmingly choosing pizza and salty snacks over healthier options, with similarly poor choices reported for the following day's meals. Consistent with this, a National Institute on Alcohol Abuse and Alcoholism analysis compared Healthy Eating Index scores with alcohol intake among roughly 3,000 participants in the National Health and Nutrition Examination Survey, measuring consumption by frequency, quantity, and average daily volume; it found that diet quality declined as alcohol quantity increased—diet quality was poorest among the heaviest drinkers and best among those who drank infrequently or lightly.

Regular heavy drinking can also produce vitamin and mineral deficiencies that disturb appetite regulation and contribute to malnutrition-related weight problems:

- Folate helps to create and maintain new cells. Alcohol interferes with its intake, absorption, transport, storage, and release.
- Vitamin B_{12} is required to make DNA and maintain healthy nerve and red blood cells. Alcohol has been shown to decrease B_{12} levels.
- Vitamin A is needed for vision, regulation of the immune system, bone growth, reproduction, cell division, and differentiation. Alcohol decreases levels of this vitamin and increases toxicity when consumed in large amounts.
- Calcium is needed for blood vessel and muscle function, for the secretion of certain hormones and enzymes, and for sending messages through the nervous system. Alcohol consumption can cause loss of calcium through urinary excretion.

=== Stress and night eating ===
A study by Jatturong R. Wichianson and colleagues at the University of Southern California found a direct relationship between eating late at night (night eating syndrome, NES) and stress levels among college students. Using standardized measures of NES and perceived stress, they found that students with higher stress levels were significantly more likely to engage in night eating, which the authors attributed to poorer coping and adaptation to the demands of college life. Late-night eating is itself correlated with weight gain in first-year populations, and psychological stress has been identified in meta-analysis as one of the predictors of freshman weight gain.

=== Other contributing factors ===
Commentators and researchers have proposed a cluster of related factors that typically coincide in the first year: sharply reduced physical activity after the end of school sports, irregular and shortened sleep, unstructured schedules, round-the-clock food availability, late-night delivery food, and—for many students—the first occasion of choosing all of their own meals with no parental oversight. Because individual changes are often small, their combined effect can go unnoticed until the accumulated surplus registers on the scale.

== By gender ==
The Mihalopoulos study, which surveyed male and female first-year students living on campus, had hypothesized that women would gain more than men; instead, men gained an average of 3.4 lb (1.5 kg) and women an average of 1.7 lb (0.77 kg) in the freshman year, a result consistent with most subsequent research. The Ohio State national data likewise showed larger gains for men (3.4 lb or 1.5 kg versus 2.4 lb or 1.1 kg), while the 2015 meta-analysis found no statistically significant sex difference (1.43 kg (3.2 lb) for men versus 1.34 kg (3.0 lb) for women). The authors of the Mihalopoulos study concluded that although large gains are uncommon—only 5 percent of their sample gained fifteen pounds or more—the freshman year carries real potential for weight gain that, if sustained, can contribute to overweight and obesity later in life. Zagorsky has similarly noted that anxiety about the "Freshman 15" falls disproportionately on young women despite the data showing they gain less than men.

== Longer-term significance ==
Even modest first-year gains matter because they tend not to be reversed. Longitudinal data indicate that weight keeps accumulating after the freshman year: in the Ohio State analysis, the typical woman gained 7 to 9 lb (3.2 to 4.1 kg) and the typical man 12 to 13 pounds (5.4 to 5.9 kg) over four years of college, and gain continued at roughly 1.5 lb (0.7 kg) per year after graduation—a trajectory that, as Zagorsky observed, leads to obesity over time regardless of starting weight. A U.S. study tracking body composition from freshman through senior year reported an average four-year gain of 3.0 kg (6.6 lb), larger in men (5.9 kg or 13 lb) than women (1.7 kg or 3.7 lb) and accompanied by increased body-fat percentage, and a five-year Belgian study found comparable continuing changes in weight and body composition across the university years. Public-health researchers therefore treat the first year of university less as a fifteen-pound emergency than as a critical window in which durable eating, drinking, and exercise habits are established.

== Prevention ==
Recommendations commonly offered by campus health services and nutrition researchers include taking smaller portions and making a single trip through buffet lines; emphasizing fruit, vegetables, and protein at meals; limiting sugary drinks and alcohol; keeping healthy snacks on hand to displace late-night junk food; maintaining regular physical activity; protecting sleep; and using campus resources such as nutrition counseling, recreation facilities, and stress-management services. Experts also caution that excessive worry about the "Freshman 15" can itself be counterproductive by encouraging unhealthy dieting and poor body image, and note that ordinary weight gain in the late teens and early twenties is, to a degree, a normal part of development for students and non-students alike.

== See also ==
- Freshman
- Obesity
- Night eating syndrome
- Binge drinking

== Bibliography ==
- Brown, C. (March 2008). "The information trail of the 'Freshman 15' - a systematic review of a health myth within the research and popular literature". Health Information and Libraries Journal. 25 (1): 1–12. doi:10.1111/j.1471-1842.2007.00762.x. PMID 18251907.
