= Binge Eating Scale =

- Purpose: assessment of eating behavior

The Binge Eating Scale is a sixteen item questionnaire used to assess the presence of binge eating behavior indicative of an eating disorder. It was devised by J. Gormally et al. in 1982 specifically for use with obese individuals. The questions are based upon both behavioral characteristics (e.g., amount of food consumed) and the emotional, cognitive response, guilt or shame.

== Scoring ==
Each question has 3–4 separate responses assigned a numerical value. The score range is from 0–46:

- Non-binging; less than 17
- Moderate binging; 18–26
- Severe binging; 27 and greater

== See also ==
- Binge eating disorder
- Bulimia nervosa
- Eating disorders
