= Albert Stunkard =

American psychiatrist

- Born: February 7, 1922; New York City, US
- Died: July 12, 2014 (aged 92); Bryn Mawr, Pennsylvania, US
- Education: Yale University (BA); Columbia University (MD)
- Known for: Studies on binge eating disorder and night eating syndrome

Albert J. ("Mickey") Stunkard (February 7, 1922 – July 12, 2014) was an American psychiatrist. He is known for his first descriptions of binge eating disorder and night eating syndrome in the 1950s.

== Life ==
Albert Stunkard was born in Manhattan, New York City, as the son of biologist Horace Stunkard. He studied medicine at Yale University and received his bachelor's degree in 1943. He received his MD from Columbia University in 1945. During World War II, he served as a physician in the United States Army in Japan. He was a lifelong student of D. T. Suzuki.

From 1973 to 1977 he was the head of the psychiatric department at Stanford University. Yet, he spent the majority of his career as a psychiatrist and researcher at the University of Pennsylvania.

== Death ==
He died on July 12, 2014, in his Bryn Mawr, Pennsylvania, home from pneumonia. He is generally considered as one of the most famous pioneers in obesity research. His work in 1959 is regarded as the beginning of pessimism about long-term weight management.

There is a chair professorship at the Perelman School of Medicine at the University of Pennsylvania named for Stunkard. Holders of the chair have included Thomas A. Wadden.

== Selected publications ==
- Albert J. Stunkard, Andrew Baum (Eds.): Perspectives in Behavioral Medicine – Eating, Sleeping, and Sex. 1st edition. Psychology Press, Hove, UK 1989, ISBN 978-0805802801
- Thomas A. Wadden, Albert J. Stunkard (Eds.): Obesity: Theory and Therapy. 2nd edition. Raven Press, New York 1993, ISBN 978-0881678840.
- Kelly C. Allison, Albert J. Stunkard, Sara L. Thier: Overcoming Night Eating Syndrome. New Harbinger Publications, Oakland 2004, ISBN 978-1572243279
- Thomas A. Wadden, Albert J. Stunkard (Eds.): Handbook of Obesity Treatment. 1st edition. The Guilford Press, New York 2004, ISBN 978-1593850944
- Jennifer D. Lundgren, Kelly C. Allison, Albert J. Stunkard (Eds.): Night Eating Syndrome: Research, Assessment, and Treatment. 1st edition. The Guilford Press, New York 2012, ISBN 978-1462506309.
