= Eating Disorder Examination Interview =

Semi-structured clinical interview

- Purpose: assessment of eating disorder

The Eating Disorder Examination Interview (EDE) devised by Cooper & Fairburn (1987) is a semi-structured interview conducted by a clinician in the assessment of an eating disorder.

== EDE ==
The EDE is a semi-structured interview conducted by a trained clinician to assess the psychopathology associated with the diagnosis of an eating disorder. The EDE is rated through the use of four subscales and a global score. The four subscales are:

- Restraint
- Eating concern
- Shape concern
- Weight concern

The questions concern the frequency in which the patient engages in behaviors indicative of an eating disorder over a 28-day period. The test is scored on a 7-point scale from 0–6. With a zero score indicating not having engaged in the questioned behavior.

=== EDE-Q ===
The Eating Disorder Examination Questionnaire (EDE-Q) was adapted from the EDE. The EDE-Q is a 28 item self-report questionnaire. It retains the format of the EDE including the 4 subscales and global score. It also concerns behaviors over a 28-day time period and retains the scoring system of 0–6, with 0 indicating no days, 1=1–5 days, 2=6–12 days, 3=13–15 days, 4=16–22 days, 5=23–27 days and 6= every day.

=== Eating Disorder Examination Child version (Edition 17.0D/C.1) ===
The Child version is based on the adult EDE-17.0D and is designed for children and adolescents ages 8 and older. The current version is adjusted to the DSM-5 and reflects the latest changes to eating disorders criteria. The Child EDE is a semi-structured interview that has to be administered by a trained clinician.

The child version contains a few adjustments reflecting considerations to make it more developmentally appropriate for children. Some of the questions are presented as tasks to help children express more abstract concepts and ideas. Consideration is also given to children's limited autonomy regarding their eating and feeding habits. In addition, the parents are asked to fill out a diary describing activities over the past 28 days prior to the interview to assist the child in recalling events of the past weeks to allow better reporting.

== See also ==
- Body Attitudes Questionnaire
- Body Attitudes Test
- Eating Attitudes Test
- Eating Disorder Inventory
- SCOFF questionnaire
