= Nocturnal sleep-related eating disorder =

Other specified feeding or eating disorder
- Other names: Sleep-related eating disorder (SRED), sleep eating, somnambulistic eating
- Specialty: Psychiatry, sleep medicine

Nocturnal sleep-related eating disorder (NSRED) is a combination of a parasomnia and an eating disorder. It is a non-rapid eye movement sleep (NREM) parasomnia. It is described as being in a specific category within somnambulism or a state of sleepwalking that includes behaviors connected to a person's conscious wishes or wants. Thus many times NSRED is a person's fulfilling of their conscious wants that they suppress; however, this disorder is difficult to distinguish from other similar types of disorders.

== Signs and symptoms ==
Several studies have found that those affected by NSRED all have different symptoms and behaviors specific to them, yet they also all have similar characteristics that doctors and psychologists have identified to distinguish NSRED from other combinations of sleep and eating disorders such as night eating syndrome. Winkelman says that typical behaviors for patients with NSRED include: "Partial arousals from sleep, usually within 2 to 3 hours of sleep onset, and subsequent ingestion of food in a rapid or 'out of control' manner." They also will attempt to eat bizarre amalgamations of foods and even potentially harmful substances such as glue, wood, or other toxic materials. In addition, Schenck and Mahowald noted that their patients mainly ate sweets, pastas, both hot and cold meals, improper substances such as "raw, frozen, or spoiled foods; salt or sugar sandwiches; buttered cigarettes; and odd mixtures prepared in a blender."

During the handling of this food, patients with NSRED distinguish themselves, as they are usually messy or harmful to themselves. Some eat their food with their bare hands while others attempt to eat it with utensils. This occasionally results in injuries to the person as well as other injuries. After completing their studies, Schenck and Mahowald said, "Injuries resulted from the careless cutting of food or opening of cans; consumption of scalding fluids (coffee) or solids (hot oatmeal); and frenzied running into walls, kitchen counters, and furniture." A few of the more notable symptoms of this disorder include large amounts of weight gain over short periods of time, particularly in women; irritability during the day, due to lack of restful sleep; and vivid dreams at night. It is easily distinguished from regular sleepwalking by the typical behavioral sequence consisting of "rapid, 'automatic' arising from bed, and immediate entry into the kitchen." In addition, throughout all of the studies done, doctors and psychiatrists discovered that these symptoms are invariant across weekdays, weekends, and vacations as well as the eating excursions being erratically spread throughout a sleep cycle. Most people with this disease retain no control over when they arise and consume food in their sleep. Although some have been able to restrain themselves from indulging in their unconscious appetites, some have not and must turn to alternative methods of stopping this disorder. It is important for trained physicians to recognize these symptoms in their patients as quickly as possible, so those with NSRED may be treated before they injure themselves.

== Diagnosis ==
=== Criteria ===
The diagnostic criteria utilized by the International Classification of Sleep Disorders-Third Edition (ICSD-3) include some dysfunctional eating when the person wake up during the main sleep period, eating unusual or toxic food, negative health consequences. The patient could be injured during these episodes and he might not be conscious and won't remember them. This criterion differentiates SRED from Night eating syndrome(NES). Patients with NES are conscious during the episode.

=== Differential diagnosis ===
NSRED is closely related to night eating syndrome (NES) except for the fact that those with NES are completely awake and aware of their eating and bingeing at night while those with NSRED are sleeping and unaware of what they are doing. NES is primarily considered an eating disorder while NSRED is primarily considered a parasomnia; however, both are a combination of parasomnia and eating disorders since those with NES usually have insomnia or difficulty sleeping and those with NSRED experience symptoms similar to binge eating. Some even argue over whether NES and NSRED are the same or distinct disorders. Even though there have been debates over these two disorders, specialists have examined them to try to determine the differences. Dr. J. Winkelman noted several features of the two disorders that were similar, but he gave one important factor that make these disorders different. In his article "Sleep-Related Eating Disorder and Night Eating Syndrome: Sleep Disorders, Eating Disorders, Or both", Winkelman said, "Both [disorders] involve nearly nightly binging at multiple nocturnal awakenings, defined as excess calorie intake or loss of control over consumption." He also reported that both disorders have a common occurrence of approximately one to five percent of adults, have been predominantly found in women, with a young adult onset, have a chronic course, have a primary morbidity of weight gain, sleep disruption, and shame over loss of control over food intake, have familial bases, and have been observed to have comorbid depression and daytime eating disorders. However, Winkelman said, "The most prominent cited distinction between NES and SRED is the level of consciousness during nighttime eating episodes." Therefore, these two disorders are extremely similar with only one distinction between them. Doctors and psychologists have difficulty differentiating between NES and NSRED, but the distinction of a person's level of consciousness is what doctors chiefly rely on to make a diagnosis. One mistake that is often made is the misdiagnosis of NSRED for NES. However, even though NSRED is not a commonly known and diagnosed disease, many people with it in differing ways while doctors work to find a treatment that works for everyone; several studies have been done on NSRED, such as the one conducted by Schenck and Mahowald. These studies, in turn, provide the basic information on this disorder including the symptoms, behaviors, and possible treatments that doctors are using today.

== Treatment ==
For those patients who have not been able to stop this disorder on their own, doctors have been working to discover a treatment that will work for everyone. One treatment that Schenck and Mahowald studied consisted of psychotherapy combined with "environmental manipulation". This was usually done separately from the weight-reducing diets. However, during this study only 10 percent of the patients were able to lose more than one third of their initial excess weight, which was not a viable percentage. In addition, they reported that many of the patients experienced "major depression" and "severe anxiety" during the attempted treatments. This was not one of the most successful attempts to help those with NSRED.

However, Dr. R. Auger reported on another trial treatment where patients were treated utilizing pramipexole. Those conducting the treatment noticed how the nocturnal median motor activity was decreased, as was assessed by actigraphy, and individual progress of sleep quality was reported. Nevertheless, Augur also said, "27 percent of subjects had RLS (restless legs syndrome, a condition known to respond to this medication), and number and duration of waking episodes related to eating behaviors were unchanged." Encouraged by the positive response verified in the above-mentioned trial treatment, doctors and psychiatrists conducted a more recent study described by Auger as "efficacy of topiramate [an antiepileptic drug associated with weight loss] in 17 consecutive patients with NSRED." Out of the 65 percent of patients who continued to take the medication on a regular basis, all confirmed either considerable development or absolute remission of "night-eating" in addition to "significant weight loss" being achieved. This has been one of the most effective treatments discovered so far, but many patients still had NSRED. Therefore, other treatments were sought after.

Such treatments include those targeted to associated sleep disorders with the hope that it would play an essential part of the treatment process of NSRED. In Schenck and Mahowald's series, combinations of cardibopa/L-dopa, codeine, and clonazepam were used to treat five patients with RLS and one patient with somnambulism and PLMS (periodic limb movements in sleep). These patients all were with NSRED as well as these other disorders, and they all experienced a remission of their NSRED as a result of taking these drugs. Two patients with OSA (obstructive sleep apnea) and NSRED also reported as having a "resolution of their symptoms with nasal continuous positive airway pressure (nCPAP) therapy." Clonazepam monotherapy was also found to be successful in 50 percent of patients with simultaneous somnambulism. Dopaminergic agents such as monotherapy were effective in 25 percent of the NSRED subgroup. Success with combinations of dopaminergic and opioid drugs, with the occasional addition of sedatives, also was found in seven patients without associated sleep disorders. In those for whom opioids and sedatives are relatively contraindicated (e.g., in those with histories of substance abuse), two case reports were described as meeting with success with a combination of bupropion, levodopa, and trazodone. Notably, hypnotherapy, psychotherapy, and various behavioral techniques, including environmental manipulation, were not effective on the majority of the patients studied. Nevertheless, Auger argue that behavioral strategies should complement the overall treatment plan and should include deliberate placement of food to avoid indiscriminate wandering, maintenance of a safe sleep environment, and education regarding proper sleep hygiene and stress management. Even with their extensive studies, Schenck and Mahowald did not find the success as Auger found by treating his patients with topiramate.

== History ==
The first case of NSRED was reported in 1955, but over the next 36 years, only nine more reports were made of this syndrome. Seven of these reports were single-case studies and the other two instances were seen during objective sleep studies, all done by psychiatrists and doctors. Schenck and Mahowald were the first to a major study on this disorder. They started their study of NSRED in 1985 and continued until 1993 with several cases among a total of 38 other various sleep-related disorders. Many of the cases they observed had symptoms that overlapped with those of NES, but this study was the first to discover that NSRED was different from NES in the fact that those with NSRED were either partially or completely unaware of their actions at night while those with NES were aware. Schenck and Mahowald also discovered that none of the patients had any eating instability before their problems at night while sleeping. In their 1993 report, they summarized the major findings with the idea that women encompass at least two thirds of the patients and that the majority of these patients had become overweight. They also discovered that while the patients' night-eating normally started during early adulthood, this wasn't always the case as it started as early as childhood to as late as middle adulthood. These patients not only had NSRED, but many of them had also had other nighttime behaviors such as sleep terrors for several years. This revolutionized the way people saw NSRED. With the technological age growing and more people becoming obese, Schenck and Mahowald's discovery of NSRED causing a large weight increase helped doctors more easily identify this disorder. As seen in Table 1 below, almost half of Schenck and Mahowald's patients were significantly obese. According to body mass index's criteria, no patient was emaciated. Schenck and Mahowald said, "virtually all patients had accurate non-distorted appraisals of their body size, shape, and weight. Furthermore, unlike the patients in Stunkard's series, none of our patients had problematic eating in the evening between dinner and bedtime; sleep onset insomnia was not present; and sleep latency was usually brief, apart from several patients with RLS." After realizing what was wrong with them, many of Schenck and Mahowald's patients with NSRED restricted their day eating and over exercised. This table summary identifies the first initial findings concerning NSRED, and it shows how NSRED is a random malady that affects many different types of people in individual ways.

== See also ==
- Night eating syndrome
