= Eating disorder =

Mental illness

- Specialty: Neurology, psychiatry, clinical psychology, gastroenterology if caused by GI illness, phoniatrics if caused by dysphagia, dentistry if caused by very bad breath
- Symptoms: Abnormal eating habits that negatively affect physical or mental health
- Complications: Anxiety disorders, depression, substance abuse, arrhythmia, heart failure and other heart problems, acid reflux (gastroesophageal reflux disease or GERD), gastrointestinal problems, low blood pressure (hypotension), organ failure and brain damage, osteoporosis and tooth damage, severe dehydration and constipation, stopped menstrual cycles (amenorrhea), infertility, stroke
- Types: Anorexia, bulimia, binge eating disorder, pica, rumination disorder, avoidant/restrictive food intake disorder, night eating syndrome
- Causes: Multiple
- Risk factors: Gastrointestinal disorders, history of sexual abuse, bullying, social media, being a dancer or gymnast
- Treatment: Counseling, proper diet, normal amount of exercise, medications

An eating disorder (ED) is a mental disorder defined by abnormal eating behaviors that adversely affect a person's physical or mental health. These behaviors may include eating too much food or too little food, as well as body image issues. Types of eating disorders include anorexia, where the person has an intense fear of gaining weight, thus restricts food and/or over exercises to manage this fear; bulimia, where individuals eat a large quantity (binging) then try to rid themselves of the food (purging), in an attempt to not gain any weight; binge eating disorder, where the person suffering keeps eating large amounts in a short period of time typically while not being hungry, often leading to weight gain; pica, where the patient eats non-food items; rumination syndrome, where the patient regurgitates undigested or minimally digested food; avoidant/restrictive food intake disorder (ARFID), where people have a reduced or selective food intake due to some psychological reasons; and a group of other specified feeding or eating disorders. Anxiety disorders, depression and substance abuse are common among people with eating disorders. These disorders do not include obesity. People often experience comorbidity between an eating disorder and OCD.

The causes of eating disorders are not clear, although both biological and environmental factors appear to play a role. Cultural idealization of thinness is believed to contribute to some eating disorders. Individuals who have experienced sexual abuse are also more likely to develop eating disorders. Some disorders such as pica and rumination disorder occur more often in people with intellectual disabilities.

Treatment can be effective for many eating disorders. Treatment varies by disorder and may involve counseling, dietary advice, reducing excessive exercise, and the reduction of efforts to eliminate food. Medications may be used to help with some of the associated symptoms. Hospitalization may be needed in more serious cases. About 70% of people with anorexia nervosa and 50% of people with bulimia recover within five years. Only 10% of people with eating disorders receive treatment, and of those, approximately 80% do not receive the proper care. Many are sent home weeks earlier than the recommended stay and are not provided with the necessary treatment. Recovery from binge eating disorder is less clear and estimated at 20% to 60%. Both anorexia nervosa and bulimia nervosa increase the risk of death.

Estimates of the prevalence of eating disorders vary widely, reflecting differences in gender, age, and culture as well as methods used for diagnosis and measurement. In the developed world, anorexia nervosa affects about 0.4% and bulimia affects about 1.3% of young women in a given year. Binge eating disorder affects about 1.6% of women and 0.8% of men in a given year. According to one analysis, the percent of women who will have anorexia nervosa at some point in their lives may be up to 4%, or up to 2% for bulimia and binge eating disorders. Rates of eating disorders appear to be lower in less developed countries. Anorexia nervosa and bulimia occur nearly ten times more often in females than males. The typical onset of eating disorders is in late childhood to early adulthood. Rates of other eating disorders are not clear.

== Classification ==
=== ICD and DSM diagnoses ===
These eating disorders are specified as mental disorders in standard medical manuals, including the ICD-10 and the DSM-5.

- Anorexia nervosa (AN) is the restriction of energy intake relative to requirements, leading to significantly low body weight in the context of age, sex, developmental trajectory, and physical health. It is accompanied by an intense fear of gaining weight or becoming fat, as well as a disturbance in the way one experiences and appraises their body weight or shape. There are two subtypes of AN: the restricting type, and the binge-eating/purging type. The restricting type describes weight loss/weight suppression being attained through dieting, fasting, and/or excessive exercise, with an absence of binge/purge behaviors. The binge-eating/purging type describes presentations in which the individual with the condition has engaged in recurrent episodes of binge-eating and purging behavior, such as self-induced vomiting, misuse of laxatives, and diuretics.
  - Pubertal and post-pubertal females with anorexia nervosa often experience amenorrhea, that is, the loss of menstrual periods, due to the extreme weight loss these individuals face. Although amenorrhea was a required criterion for a diagnosis of anorexia nervosa in the DSM-IV, it was dropped in the DSM-5 due to its exclusive nature, as male, post-menopause women, or individuals who do not menstruate for other reasons would fail to meet this criterion. Females with bulimia may also experience amenorrhea, although the cause is not clear.
- Bulimia nervosa (BN) is characterized by recurrent binge eating followed by compensatory behaviors such as purging (self-induced vomiting, eating to the point of vomiting, excessive use of laxatives/diuretics, excessive exercise, and/or fasting). However, unlike anorexia nervosa, body weight is maintained at or above a minimally normal level. Severity of BN is determined by the number of episodes of inappropriate compensatory behaviors per week.
- Binge eating disorder (BED) is characterized by recurrent episodes of binge eating without use of inappropriate compensatory behaviors that are present in BN and AN binge-eating/purging subtype. Binge eating episodes are associated with eating much more rapidly than normal, eating until feeling uncomfortably full, eating large amounts of food when not feeling physically hungry, eating alone because of feeling embarrassed by how much one is eating, and/or feeling disgusted with oneself, depressed, and/or very guilty after eating. For a BED diagnosis to be given, marked distress regarding binge eating must be present, and the binge eating must occur an average of once a week for 3 months. Severity of BED is determined by the number of binge eating episodes per week.
- Pica is the persistent eating of nonnutritive, nonfood substances in a way that is not developmentally appropriate or culturally supported. Although substances consumed vary with age and availability, paper, soap, hair, chalk, paint, and clay are among the most commonly consumed in those with a pica diagnosis. There are multiple causes for the onset of pica, including iron-deficiency anemia, malnutrition, and pregnancy, and pica often occurs in tandem with other mental health disorders associated with impaired function, such as intellectual disability, autism spectrum disorder, and schizophrenia. In order for a diagnosis of pica to be warranted, behaviors must last for at least one month.
- Rumination disorder encompasses the repeated regurgitation of food, which may be re-chewed, re-swallowed, or spit out. For this diagnosis to be warranted, behaviors must persist for at least one month, and regurgitation of food cannot be attributed to another medical condition. Additionally, rumination disorder is distinct from AN, BN, BED, and ARFID, and thus cannot occur during the course of one of these illnesses.
- Avoidant/restrictive food intake disorder (ARFID) is a feeding or eating disturbance, such as a lack of interest in eating food, avoidance based on sensory characteristics of food, or concern about aversive consequences of eating, that prevents one from meeting nutritional energy needs. It is frequently associated with weight loss, nutritional deficiency, or failure to meet growth trajectories. Notably, ARFID is distinguishable from AN and BN in that there is no evidence of a disturbance in the way in which one's body weight or shape is experienced. The disorder is not better explained by lack of available food, cultural practices, a concurrent medical condition, or another mental disorder.
- Other Specified Feeding or Eating Disorder (OSFED) is an eating or feeding disorder that does not meet full DSM-5 criteria for AN, BN, or BED. Examples of otherwise-specified eating disorders include atypical anorexia nervosa, who meet all criteria for AN except being underweight despite substantial weight loss; atypical bulimia nervosa, who meet all criteria for BN except that bulimic behaviors are less frequent or have not been ongoing for long enough; purging disorder; and night eating syndrome.
- Unspecified Feeding or Eating Disorder (USFED) describes feeding or eating disturbances that cause marked distress and impairment in important areas of functioning but that do not meet the full criteria for any of the other diagnoses. The specific reason the presentation does not meet criteria for a specified disorder is not given. For example, an USFED diagnosis may be given when there is insufficient information to make a more specific diagnosis, such as in an emergency room setting.

=== Other ===
- Compulsive overeating, which may include habitual "grazing" of food or episodes of binge eating without feelings of guilt.
- Diabulimia, which is characterized by the deliberate manipulation of insulin levels by diabetics in an effort to control their weight.
- Drunkorexia, which is commonly characterized by purposely restricting food intake in order to reserve food calories for alcoholic calories, exercising excessively in order to burn calories from drinking, and over-drinking alcohol in order to purge previously consumed food.
- Food maintenance, which is characterized by a set of aberrant eating behaviors of children in foster care.
- Night eating syndrome, which is characterized by nocturnal hyperphagia (consumption of 25% or more of the total daily calories after the evening meal) with nocturnal ingestions, insomnia, loss of morning appetite and depression.
- Nocturnal sleep-related eating disorder, which is a parasomnia characterized by eating, habitually out-of-control, while in a state of NREM sleep, with no memory of this the next morning.
- Gourmand syndrome, a rare condition occurring after damage to the frontal lobe. Individuals develop an obsessive focus on fine foods.
- Orthorexia nervosa, a term used by Steven Bratman to describe an obsession with a "pure" diet, in which a person develops an obsession with avoiding unhealthy foods to the point where it interferes with the person's life.
- Klüver-Bucy syndrome, caused by bilateral lesions of the medial temporal lobe, includes compulsive eating, hypersexuality, hyperorality, visual agnosia, and docility.
- Prader-Willi syndrome, a genetic disorder associated with insatiable appetite and morbid obesity.
- Pregorexia, which is characterized by extreme dieting and over-exercising in order to control pregnancy weight gain. Prenatal undernutrition is associated with low birth weight, coronary heart disease, type 2 diabetes, stroke, hypertension, cardiovascular disease risk, and depression.
- Muscle dysmorphia is characterized by appearance preoccupation that one's own body is too small, too skinny, insufficiently muscular, or insufficiently lean. Muscle dysmorphia affects mostly males.
- Purging disorder. Recurrent purging behavior to influence weight or shape in the absence of binge eating. It is more properly a disorder of elimination rather than eating disorder.

== Symptoms and long-term effects ==
Symptoms and complications vary according to the nature and severity of the eating disorder:

Possible complications
acne	xerosis	amenorrhoea	tooth loss, cavities
constipation	diarrhea	water retention and/or edema	lanugo
telogen effluvium	cardiac arrest	hypokalemia	death
osteoporosis	electrolyte imbalance	hyponatremia	brain atrophy
pellagra	scurvy	kidney failure	suicide

Associated physical symptoms of eating disorders include weakness, fatigue, sensitivity to cold, reduced beard growth in men, reduction in waking erections, reduced libido, weight loss and growth failure.

Frequent vomiting, which may cause acid reflux or entry of acidic gastric material into the laryngoesophageal tract, can lead to unexplained hoarseness. As such, individuals who induce vomiting as part of their eating disorder, such as those with anorexia nervosa binge-eating/purging type, or those with purging-type bulimia nervosa, are at risk for acid reflux.

Polyendocrine metabolic ovarian syndrome (PMOS) is the most common endocrine disorder to affect women. Though often associated with obesity it can occur in normal weight individuals. PMOS has been associated with binge eating and bulimic behavior.

Other possible manifestations are dry lips, burning tongue, parotid gland swelling, and temporomandibular disorders.

=== Psychopathology ===
The psychopathology of eating disorders centers around body image disturbance, such as concerns with weight and shape; self-worth being too dependent on weight and shape; fear of gaining weight even when underweight; denial of how severe the symptoms are; and a distortion in the way the body is experienced.

The main psychopathological features of anorexia nervosa were outlined in 1982 as problems in body perception, emotion processing and interpersonal relationships. Women with eating disorders have greater body dissatisfaction. This impairment of body perception involves vision, proprioception, interoception and tactile perception. There is an alteration in integration of signals in which body parts are experienced as dissociated from the body as a whole. Bruch once theorized that difficult early relationships were related to the cause of anorexia nervosa and how primary caregivers can contribute to the onset of the illness.

A prominent feature of bulimia is dissatisfaction with body shape. However, this dissatisfaction is not of diagnostic significance, as it is sometimes present in individuals with no eating disorder. This highly labile feature can fluctuate depending on changes in shape and weight, the degree of control over eating, and mood. In contrast, having overvalued ideas about shape and weight in general is a necessary diagnostic feature for anorexia nervosa and bulimia nervosa.

=== Pro-ana subculture ===
Pro-ana refers to the promotion of behaviors related to the eating disorder anorexia nervosa. Several websites promote eating disorders, and can provide a means for individuals to communicate in order to maintain eating disorders. Members of these websites typically feel that their eating disorder is the only aspect of a chaotic life that they can control. These websites are often interactive and have discussion boards where individuals can share strategies, ideas, and experiences, such as diet and exercise plans that achieve extremely low weights. A study comparing the personal web-blogs that were pro-eating disorder with those focused on recovery found that the pro-eating disorder blogs contained language reflecting lower cognitive processing, used a more closed-minded writing style, contained less emotional expression and fewer social references, and focused more on eating-related contents than did the recovery blogs.

== Causes ==
There is no single cause of eating disorders.

Many people with eating disorders also have body image disturbance and a comorbid body dysmorphic disorder (BDD), leading them to an altered perception of their body. Studies have found that a high proportion of individuals diagnosed with body dysmorphic disorder also had some type of eating disorder, with 15% of individuals having either anorexia nervosa or bulimia nervosa. This link between body dysmorphic disorder and anorexia nervosa stems from the fact that both BDD and anorexia nervosa are characterized by a preoccupation with physical appearance and a distortion of body image. Individuals with both conditions often experience extreme distress about perceived physical flaws that may not exist or are greatly exaggerated. This obsessive focus on appearance can lead to repetitive behaviors such as mirror checking, excessive exercising, or restrictive eating in an attempt to 'fix' the imagined flaws.

There are also many other possibilities such as environmental, social and interpersonal issues that could promote and sustain these illnesses. Also, the media are oftentimes blamed for the rise in the incidence of eating disorders due to the fact that media images of idealized slim physical shape of people such as models and celebrities motivate or even force people to attempt to achieve slimness themselves. The media are accused of distorting reality, in the sense that people portrayed in the media are either naturally thin and thus unrepresentative of normality or unnaturally thin by forcing their bodies to look like the ideal image by putting excessive pressure on themselves to look a certain way. While past findings have described eating disorders as primarily psychological, environmental, and sociocultural, further studies have uncovered evidence that there is a genetic component.

=== Genetics ===
Numerous studies show a genetic predisposition toward eating disorders. Twin studies have found a slight instances of genetic variance when considering the different criterion of both anorexia nervosa and bulimia nervosa as endophenotypes contributing to the disorders as a whole. An individual who is a first degree relative of someone who has had or currently has an eating disorder is seven to twelve times more likely to have an eating disorder themselves. Twin studies also show that at least a portion of the vulnerability to develop eating disorders can be inherited, and there is evidence to show that there is a genetic locus that shows susceptibility for developing anorexia nervosa. About 50% of eating disorder cases are attributable to genetics. Other cases are due to external reasons or developmental problems. There are also other neurobiological factors at play tied to emotional reactivity and impulsivity that could lead to binging and purging behaviors.

Epigenetics mechanisms are means by which environmental effects alter gene expression via methods such as DNA methylation; these are independent of and do not alter the underlying DNA sequence. They are heritable, but also may occur throughout the lifespan, and are potentially reversible. Dysregulation of dopaminergic neurotransmission due to epigenetic mechanisms has been implicated in various eating disorders. Other candidate genes for epigenetic studies in eating disorders include leptin, pro-opiomelanocortin (POMC) and brain-derived neurotrophic factor (BDNF).

There has found to be a genetic correlation between anorexia nervosa and OCD, suggesting a strong etiology. First and second relatives of probands with OCD have a greater chance of developing anorexia nervosa as genetic relatedness increases.

=== Psychological ===
Eating disorders are classified as Axis I disorders in the Diagnostic and Statistical Manual of Mental Health Disorders (DSM-IV) published by the American Psychiatric Association. There are various other psychological issues that may factor into eating disorders, some fulfill the criteria for a separate Axis I diagnosis or a personality disorder which is coded Axis II and thus are considered comorbid to the diagnosed eating disorder. Axis II disorders are subtyped into 3 "clusters": A, B and C. The causality between personality disorders and eating disorders has yet to be fully established. Some people have a previous disorder which may increase their vulnerability to developing an eating disorder. Some develop them afterwards. The severity and type of eating disorder symptoms have been shown to affect comorbidity. There has been controversy over various editions of the DSM diagnostic criteria including the latest edition, DSM-5, published in 2013.

Comorbid Disorders
Axis I	Axis II
depression	obsessive–compulsive personality disorder
substance abuse, alcoholism	borderline personality disorder
anxiety disorders	narcissistic personality disorder
obsessive–compulsive disorder	histrionic personality disorder
Attention-deficit hyperactivity disorder	avoidant personality disorder

==== Cognitive attentional bias ====
Attentional bias may have an effect on eating disorders. Attentional bias is the preferential attention toward certain types of information in the environment while simultaneously ignoring others. Individuals with eating disorders may develop disordered schemata which focus on body size and eating, and these schemata may bias judgements, thoughts, and behaviours in a manner that is self-destructive or maladaptive. Information contained within those schemata is thought to be given the highest level of importance and overvalued among other cognitive structures. People who have eating disorders tend to pay more attention to stimuli related to food. For people struggling to recover from an eating disorder or addiction, this tendency to pay attention to certain signals while discounting others can make recovery that much more difficult.

Studies have utilized the Stroop task to assess the probable effect of attentional bias on eating disorders. This may involve separating food and eating words from body shape and weight words. Such studies have found that anorexic subjects were slower to colour name food related words than control subjects. Other studies have noted that individuals with eating disorders have significant attentional biases associated with eating and weight stimuli.

=== Personality traits ===
There are various childhood personality traits associated with the development of eating disorders, such as perfectionism and neuroticism. These personality traits are found to link eating disorders and OCD. During adolescence these traits may become intensified due to a variety of physiological and cultural influences such as the hormonal changes associated with puberty, stress related to the approaching demands of maturity and socio-cultural influences and perceived expectations, especially in areas that concern body image. Eating disorders have been associated with a fragile sense of self and with disordered mentalization. Many personality traits have a genetic component and are highly heritable. Maladaptive levels of certain traits may be acquired as a result of anoxic or traumatic brain injury, neurodegenerative diseases such as Parkinson's disease, neurotoxicity such as lead exposure, bacterial infection such as Lyme disease or parasitic infection such as Toxoplasma gondii as well as hormonal influences. While studies are still continuing via the use of various imaging techniques such as fMRI; these traits have been shown to originate in various regions of the brain such as the amygdala and the prefrontal cortex. Disorders in the prefrontal cortex and the executive functioning system have been shown to affect eating behavior.

=== Celiac disease ===
People with gastrointestinal disorders may be more risk of developing disordered eating practices than the general population, principally restrictive eating disturbances. An association of anorexia nervosa with celiac disease has been found. The role that gastrointestinal symptoms play in the development of eating disorders seems rather complex. Some authors report that unresolved symptoms prior to gastrointestinal disease diagnosis may create a food aversion in these persons, causing alterations to their eating patterns. Other authors report that greater symptoms throughout their diagnosis led to greater risk. It has been documented that some people with celiac disease, irritable bowel syndrome or inflammatory bowel disease who are not conscious about the importance of strictly following their diet, choose to consume their trigger foods to promote weight loss. On the other hand, individuals with good dietary management may develop anxiety, food aversion and eating disorders because of concerns around cross contamination of their foods. Some authors suggest that medical professionals should evaluate the presence of an unrecognized celiac disease in all people with eating disorder, especially if they present any gastrointestinal symptom (such as decreased appetite, abdominal pain, bloating, distension, vomiting, diarrhea or constipation), weight loss, or growth failure; and also routinely ask celiac patients about weight or body shape concerns, dieting or vomiting for weight control, to evaluate the possible presence of eating disorders.

=== Environmental influences ===
==== Child maltreatment ====
Child abuse which encompasses physical, psychological, and sexual abuse, as well as neglect, has been shown to approximately triple the risk of an eating disorder. Sexual abuse appears to double the risk of bulimia; however, the association is less clear for anorexia nervosa. The risk for individuals developing eating disorders increases if the individual grew up in an invalidating environment where displays of emotions were often punished. Abuse that has also occurred in childhood produces intolerable difficult emotions that cannot be expressed in a healthy manner. Eating disorders come in as an escape coping mechanism, as a means to control and avoid overwhelming negative emotions and feelings. Those who report physical or sexual maltreatment as a child are at an increased risk of developing an eating disorder.

==== Social isolation ====
Social isolation has been shown to have a deleterious effect on an individual's physical and emotional well-being. Those that are socially isolated have a higher mortality rate in general as compared to individuals that have established social relationships. This effect on mortality is markedly increased in those with pre-existing medical or psychiatric conditions, and has been especially noted in cases of coronary heart disease. "The magnitude of risk associated with social isolation is comparable with that of cigarette smoking and other major biomedical and psychosocial risk factors." (Brummett et al.)

Social isolation can be inherently stressful, depressing and anxiety-provoking. In an attempt to ameliorate these distressful feelings an individual may engage in emotional eating in which food serves as a source of comfort. The loneliness of social isolation and the inherent stressors thus associated have been implicated as triggering factors in binge eating as well.

Waller, Kennerley and Ohanian (2007) argued that both bingeing–vomiting and restriction are emotion suppression strategies, but they are just utilized at different times. For example, restriction is used to pre-empt any emotion activation, while bingeing–vomiting is used after an emotion has been activated.

==== Parental influence ====
Parental influence has been shown to be an intrinsic component in the development of eating behaviors of children. This influence is manifested and shaped by a variety of diverse factors such as familial genetic predisposition, dietary choices as dictated by cultural or ethnic preferences, the parents' own body shape, how they talk about their own body, and eating patterns, the degree of involvement and expectations of their children's eating behavior as well as the interpersonal relationship of parent and child. It is also influenced by the general psychosocial climate of the home and whether a nurturing stable environment is present. It has been shown that maladaptive parental behavior has an important role in the development of eating disorders. As to the more subtle aspects of parental influence, it has been shown that eating patterns are established in early childhood and that children should be allowed to decide when their appetite is satisfied as early as the age of two. A direct link has been shown between obesity and parental pressure to eat more.

Coercive tactics in regard to diet have not been proven to be efficacious in controlling a child's eating behavior. Affection and attention have been shown to affect the degree of a child's finickiness and their acceptance of a more varied diet.

Adams and Crane (1980), have shown that parents are influenced by stereotypes that influence their perception of their child's body. The conveyance of these negative stereotypes also affects the child's own body image and satisfaction. Hilde Bruch, a pioneer in the field of studying eating disorders, asserts that anorexia nervosa often occurs in girls who are high achievers, obedient, and always trying to please their parents. Their parents have a tendency to be over-controlling and fail to encourage the expression of emotions, inhibiting daughters from accepting their own feelings and desires. Adolescent females in these overbearing families lack the ability to be independent from their families, yet realize the need to, often resulting in rebellion. Controlling their food intake may make them feel better, as it provides them with a sense of control.

Negative parental body-talk, meaning when a parent comments on their own weight, shape or size, is strongly correlated with disordered eating in their children. Children whose parents engage in self-talk about their weight frequently are three times as likely to practice extreme weight control behaviors such as disordered eating, than children who do not overhear negative parental body-talk. Additionally, negative body-talk from mothers is explicitly correlated with disordered eating in adolescent girls.

==== Peer pressure ====
In various studies such as one conducted by The McKnight Investigators, peer pressure was shown to be a significant contributor to body image concerns and attitudes toward eating among subjects in their teens and early twenties.

Eleanor Mackey and co-author, Annette M. La Greca of the University of Miami, studied 236 teen girls from public high schools in southeast Florida. "Teen girls' concerns about their own weight, about how they appear to others and their perceptions that their peers want them to be thin are significantly related to weight-control behavior", says psychologist Eleanor Mackey of the Children's National Medical Center in Washington and lead author of the study. "Those are really important."

According to one study, 40% of 9- and 10-year-old girls are already trying to lose weight. Such dieting is reported to be influenced by peer behavior, with many of those individuals on a diet reporting that their friends also were dieting. The number of friends dieting and the number of friends who pressured them to diet also played a significant role in their own choices.

Elite athletes have a significantly higher rate in eating disorders. Female athletes in sports such as gymnastics, ballet, diving, etc. are found to be at the highest risk among all athletes. Women are more likely than men to acquire an eating disorder between the ages of 13 and 25. About 0–15% of those with bulimia and anorexia are men.

Other psychological problems that could possibly create an eating disorder such as Anorexia Nervosa are depression, and low self-esteem. Depression is a state of mind where emotions are unstable causing a person's eating habits to change due to sadness and no interest of doing anything. According to PSYCOM "Studies show that a high percentage of people with an eating disorder will experience depression." Depression is a state of mind where people seem to refuge without being able to get out of it. A big factor of this can affect people with their eating and this can mostly affect teenagers. Teenagers are big candidates for Anorexia for the reason that during the teenage years, many things start changing and they start to think certain ways. According to Life Works an article about eating disorders "People of any age can be affected by pressure from their peers, the media and even their families but it is worse when you're a teenager at school."

==== Cultural pressure ====
===== Western perspective =====
There is a cultural emphasis on thinness which is especially pervasive in western society. A child's perception of external pressure to achieve the ideal body that is represented by the media predicts the child's body image dissatisfaction, body dysmorphic disorder and an eating disorder. "The cultural pressure on men and women to be 'perfect' is an important predisposing factor for the development of eating disorders". Further, when women of all races base their evaluation of their self upon what is considered the culturally ideal body, the incidence of eating disorders increases.

Socioeconomic status (SES) has been viewed as a risk factor for eating disorders, presuming that possessing more resources allows for an individual to actively choose to diet and reduce body weight. Some studies have also shown a relationship between increasing body dissatisfaction with increasing SES. However, once high socioeconomic status has been achieved, this relationship weakens and, in some cases, no longer exists.

The media plays a major role in the way in which people view themselves. Countless magazine ads and commercials depict thin celebrities. Society has taught people that being accepted by others is necessary at all costs. This has led to the belief that in order to fit in one must look a certain way. Televised beauty competitions such as the Miss America Competition contribute to the idea of what it means to be beautiful because competitors are evaluated on the basis of their opinion.

In addition to socioeconomic status being considered a cultural risk factor so is the world of sports. Athletes and eating disorders tend to go hand in hand, especially the sports where weight is a competitive factor. Gymnastics, horse back riding, wrestling, body building, Nordic skiing and dancing are just a few that fall into this category of weight dependent sports. Eating disorders among individuals that participate in competitive activities, especially women, often lead to having physical and biological changes related to their weight that often mimic prepubescent stages. Oftentimes as women's bodies change they lose their competitive edge which leads them to taking extreme measures to maintain their younger body shape. Men often struggle with binge eating followed by excessive exercise while focusing on building muscle rather than losing fat, but this goal of gaining muscle is just as much an eating disorder as obsessing over thinness. The following statistics taken from Susan Nolen-Hoeksema's book, (ab)normal psychology, show the estimated percentage of athletes that struggle with eating disorders based on the category of sport.

- Aesthetic sports (dance, figure skating, gymnastics) – 35%
- Weight dependent sports (judo, wrestling) – 29%
- Endurance sports (cycling, swimming, running) – 20%
- Technical sports (golf, high jumping) – 14%
- Ball game sports (volleyball, soccer) – 12%

Although most of these athletes develop eating disorders to keep their competitive edge, others use exercise as a way to maintain their weight and figure. This is just as serious as regulating food intake for competition. Even though there is mixed evidence showing at what point athletes are challenged with eating disorders, studies show that regardless of competition level all athletes are at higher risk for developing eating disorders that non-athletes, especially those that participate in sports where thinness is a factor.

Pressure from society is also seen within the homosexual community. Gay men are at greater risk of eating disorder symptoms than heterosexual men. Within the gay culture, muscularity gives the advantages of both social and sexual desirability and also power. These pressures and ideas that another homosexual male may desire a mate who is thinner or muscular can possibly lead to eating disorders. The higher eating disorder symptom score reported, the more concern about how others perceive them and the more frequent and excessive exercise sessions occur. High levels of body dissatisfaction are also linked to external motivation to working out and old age; however, having a thin and muscular body occurs within younger homosexual males than older.

Most of the cross-cultural studies use definitions from the DSM-IV-TR, which has been criticized as reflecting a Western cultural bias. Thus, assessments and questionnaires may not be constructed to detect some of the cultural differences associated with different disorders. Also, when looking at individuals in areas potentially influenced by Western culture, few studies have attempted to measure how much an individual has adopted the mainstream culture or retained the traditional cultural values of the area. Lastly, the majority of the cross-cultural studies on eating disorders and body image disturbances occurred in Western nations and not in the countries or regions being examined.

While there are many influences to how an individual processes their body image, the media does play a major role. Along with the media, parental influence, peer influence, and self-efficacy beliefs also play a large role in an individual's view of themselves. The way the media presents images can have a lasting effect on an individual's perception of their body image. Eating disorders are a worldwide issue and while women are more likely to be affected by an eating disorder it still affects both genders (Schwitzer 2012). The media influences eating disorders whether shown in a positive or negative light, it then has a responsibility to use caution when promoting images that projects an ideal that many turn to eating disorders to attain.

To try to address unhealthy body image in the fashion world, in 2015, France passed a law requiring models to be declared healthy by a doctor to participate in fashion shows. It also requires re-touched images to be marked as such in magazines.

There is a relationship between "thin ideal" social media content and body dissatisfaction and eating disorders among young adult women, especially in the Western hemisphere. New research points to an "internalization" of distorted images online, as well as negative comparisons among young adult women. Most studies have been based in the U.S., the U.K, and Australia, these are places where the thin ideal is strong among women, as well as the strive for the "perfect" body.

In addition to mere media exposure, there is an online "pro-eating disorder" community. Through personal blogs and Twitter, this community promotes eating disorders as a "lifestyle", and continuously posts pictures of emaciated bodies, and tips on how to stay thin. The hashtag "#proana" (pro-anorexia), is a product of this community, as well as images promoting weight loss, tagged with the term "thinspiration". According to social comparison theory, young women have a tendency to compare their appearance to others, which can result in a negative view of their own bodies and altering of eating behaviors, that in turn can develop disordered eating behaviors.

When body parts are isolated and displayed in the media as objects to be looked at, it is called objectification, and women are affected most by this phenomenon. Objectification increases self-objectification, where women judge their own body parts as a mean of praise and pleasure for others. There is a significant link between self-objectification, body dissatisfaction, and disordered eating, as the beauty ideal is altered through social media.

Although eating disorders are typically under diagnosed in people of color, they still experience eating disorders in great numbers. It is thought that the stress that those of color face in the United States from being multiply marginalized may contribute to their rates of eating disorders. Eating disorders, for these women, may be a response to environmental stressors such as racism, abuse and poverty.

===== African perspective =====
In the majority of many African communities, thinness is generally not seen as an ideal body type and most pressure to attain a slim figure may stem from influence or exposure to Western culture and ideology. Traditional African cultural ideals are reflected in the practice of some health professionals; in Ghana, pharmacists sell appetite stimulants to women who desire to, as Ghanaians stated, "grow fat". Girls are told that if they wish to find a partner and birth children they must gain weight. On the contrary, there are certain taboos surrounding a slim body image, specifically in West Africa. Lack of body fat is linked to poverty and HIV/AIDS.

However, the emergence of Western and European influence, specifically with the introduction of such fashion and modelling shows and competitions, is changing certain views among body acceptance, and the prevalence of eating disorders has consequently increased. This acculturation is also related to how South Africa is concurrently undergoing rapid, intense urbanization. Such modern development is leading to cultural changes, and professionals cite rates of eating disorders in this region will increase with urbanization, specifically with changes in identity, body image, and cultural issues. Further, exposure to Western values through private Caucasian schools or caretakers is another possible factor related to acculturation which may be associated with the onset of eating disorders.

Other factors which are cited to be related to the increasing prevalence of eating disorders in African communities can be related to sexual conflicts, such as psychosexual guilt, first sexual intercourse, and pregnancy. Traumatic events which are related to both family (i.e. parental separation) and eating related issues are also cited as possible effectors. Religious fasting, particularly around times of stress, and feelings of self-control are also cited as determinants in the onset of eating disorders.

===== Asian perspective =====
The West plays a role in Asia's economic development via foreign investments, advanced technologies joining financial markets, and the arrival of American and European companies in Asia, especially through outsourcing manufacturing operations. This exposure to Western culture, especially the media, imparts Western body ideals to Asian society, termed Westernization. In part, Westernization fosters eating disorders among Asian populations. However, there are also country-specific influences on the occurrence of eating disorders in Asia.

====== China ======
In China as well as other Asian countries, Westernization, migration from rural to urban areas, after-effects of sociocultural events, and disruptions of social and emotional support are implicated in the emergence of eating disorders. In particular, risk factors for eating disorders include higher socioeconomic status, preference for a thin body ideal, history of child abuse, high anxiety levels, hostile parental relationships, jealousy towards media idols, and above-average scores on the body dissatisfaction and interoceptive awareness sections of the Eating Disorder Inventory. Similarly to the West, researchers have identified the media as a primary source of pressures relating to physical appearance, which may even predict body change behaviors in males and females.

====== Fiji ======
While colonised by the British in 1874, Fiji kept a large degree of linguistic and cultural diversity which characterised the ethnic Fijian population. Though gaining independence in 1970, Fiji has rejected Western, capitalist values which challenged its mutual trusts, bonds, kinships and identity as a nation. Similar to studies conducted on Polynesian groups, ethnic Fijian traditional aesthetic ideals reflected a preference for a robust body shape; thus, the prevailing 'pressure to be slim,' thought to be associated with diet and disordered eating in many Western societies was absent in traditional Fiji. Additionally, traditional Fijian values would encourage a robust appetite and a widespread vigilance for and social response to weight loss. Individual efforts to reshape the body by dieting or exercise, thus traditionally was discouraged.

However, studies conducted in 1995 and 1998 both demonstrated a link between the introduction of television in the country, and the emergence of eating disorders in young adolescent ethnic Fijian girls. Through the quantitative data collected in these studies there was found to be a significant increase in the prevalence of two key indicators of disordered eating: self-induced vomiting and high Eating Attitudes Test- 26. These results were recorded following prolonged television exposure in the community, and an associated increase in the percentage of households owning television sets. Additionally, qualitative data linked changing attitudes about dieting, weight loss and aesthetic ideas in the peer environment to Western media images. The impact of television was especially profound given the longstanding social and cultural traditions that had previously rejected the notions of dieting, purging and body dissatisfaction in Fiji. Additional studies in 2011 found that social network media exposure, independent of direct media and other cultural exposures, was also associated with eating pathology.

====== Hong Kong ======
From the early- to-mid- 1990s, a variant form of anorexia nervosa was identified in Hong Kong. This variant form did not share features of anorexia nervosa in the West, notably "fat-phobia" and distorted body image. Patients attributed their restrictive food intake to somatic complaints, such as epigastric bloating, abdominal or stomach pain, or a lack of hunger or appetite. Compared to Western patients, individuals with this variant anorexia nervosa demonstrated bulimic symptoms less frequently and tended to have lower pre-morbid body mass index. This form disapproves the assumption that a "fear of fatness or weight gain" is the defining characteristic of individuals with anorexia nervosa.

====== India ======
In the past, the available evidence did not suggest that unhealthy weight loss methods and eating disordered behaviors are common in India as proven by stagnant rates of clinically diagnosed eating disorders. However, it appears that rates of eating disorders in urban areas of India are increasing based on surveys from psychiatrists who were asked whether they perceived eating disorders to be a "serious clinical issue" in India. One notable Indian psychiatrist and eating disorder specialist Dr Udipi Gauthamadas is on record saying, "Disturbed eating attitudes and behaviours affect about 25 to 40 percent of adolescent girls and around 20 percent of adolescent boys. While on one hand there is increasing recognition of eating disorders in the country, there is also a persisting belief that this illness is alien to India. This prevents many sufferers from seeking professional help."

23.5% of respondents believed that rates of eating disorders were rising in Bangalore, 26.5% claimed that rates were stagnant, and 42%, the largest percentage, expressed uncertainty. It has been suggested that urbanization and socioeconomic status are associated with increased risk for body weight dissatisfaction. However, due to the physical size of and diversity within India, trends may vary throughout the country.

==== American perspective ====
===== Black and African American =====
Historically, identifying as African American has been considered a protective factor for body dissatisfaction. Those identifying as African American have been found to have a greater acceptance of larger body image ideals and less internalization of the thin ideal, and African American women have reported the lowest levels of body dissatisfaction among the five major racial/ethnic groups in the US.

However, recent research contradicts these findings, indicating that African American women may exhibit levels of body dissatisfaction comparable to other racial/ethnic minority groups. In this way, just because those who identify as African American may not internalize the thin ideal as strongly as other racial and ethnic groups, it does not mean that they do not hold other appearance ideals that may promote body shape concerns. Similarly, recent research shows that African Americans exhibit rates of disordered eating that are similar to or even higher than their white counterparts.

===== Native American =====
Native American women are more likely than white women to both experience a fear of losing control over their eating and to abuse laxatives and diuretics for weight control purposes. They have comparable rates of binge eating and other disordered weight control behaviors in comparison to other racial groups.

===== Latinos =====
Disproportionately high rates of disordered eating and body dissatisfaction have been found in Hispanics in comparison to other racial and ethnic groups. Studies have found significantly more laxative use in those identifying as Hispanic in comparison to non-Hispanic white counterparts. Specifically, those identifying as Hispanic may be at heightened risk of engaging in binge eating and bingeing/purging behaviors.

=== Food insecurity ===
Food insecurity is defined as inadequate access to sufficient food, both in terms of quantity and quality, in direct contrast to food security, which is conceptualized as having access to sufficient, safe, and nutritious food to meet dietary needs and preferences. Notably, levels of food security exist on a continuum from reliable access to food to disrupted access to food.

Multiple studies have found food insecurity to be associated with eating pathology. A study conducted on individuals visiting a food bank in Texas found higher food insecurity to be correlated with higher levels of binge eating, overall eating disorder pathology, dietary restraint, compensatory behaviors and weight self-stigma. Findings of a replication study with a larger, more diverse sample mirrored these results, and a study looking at the relationship between food insecurity and bulimia nervosa similarly found greater food insecurity to be associated with elevated levels of eating pathology.

=== Trauma ===
One study has found that binge-eating disorder may stem from trauma, with some female patients engaging in these disorders to numb pain experienced through sexual trauma. There are various forms of trauma that individuals may have experienced, leading them to cope through an eating disorder. When in pain, individuals may attempt to exert control over this aspect of their lives, perceiving it as their only means of managing their life.

=== Sexual Orientation and Gender Identity ===
Sexual orientation, gender identity and gender norms influence people with eating disorders. Some eating disorder patients have implied that enforced heterosexuality and heterosexism led many to engage in their condition to align with norms associated with their gender identity. Families may restrict women's food intake to keep them thin, thus increasing their ability to attain a male romantic partner. Non-heterosexual male adolescents are consistently at higher risk of developing disordered eating than their heterosexual peers for various body image concerns, including worries about weight, shape, muscle tone, and definition. Eating disorders in trans and non-binary adolescents are complicated in that some eating disorder symptoms may affirm gender identity in transitioning patients, complicating treatment. For example, loss of menstruation in birth-assigned females or a slender frame in birth-assigned males may align with their gender identity during transition.

Physicians may fail to diagnose eating disorders in transitioning/transitioned patients mainly because the complex dynamic between gender identity and disordered eating is misunderstood. Furthermore, the leading driving factor of eating disorders in gender diverse patients is gender dysphoria given that both conditions are aligned with dissatisfaction with one's body. It is possible that disordered eating behaviors may be utilized as a way to change the body to better fit into the aspects of a wanted gender identity. Despite this connection, gender dysphoria often goes undetected likely due to limited provider training and lack of gender affirming care practices, eventually leading to an under diagnosis or misdiagnoses of eating disorders within transgender individuals.

Additionally, in treatment, approaches to aid are often not appropriately designed for transgender individuals. For example, patients oftentimes are given standardized calorie recommendations that overlook patients' concerns as well as go against the sufficient amount of calorie intake needed.

== Mechanisms ==
- Biochemical: Eating behavior is a complex process controlled by the neuroendocrine system, of which the Hypothalamus-pituitary-adrenal-axis (HPA axis) is a major component. Dysregulation of the HPA axis has been associated with eating disorders, such as irregularities in the manufacture, amount or transmission of certain neurotransmitters, hormones or neuropeptides and amino acids such as homocysteine, elevated levels of which are found in AN and BN as well as depression.
  - Serotonin: a neurotransmitter involved in depression also has an inhibitory effect on eating behavior.
  - Norepinephrine is both a neurotransmitter and a hormone; abnormalities in either capacity may affect eating behavior.
  - Dopamine: which in addition to being a precursor of norepinephrine and epinephrine is also a neurotransmitter which regulates the rewarding property of food.
  - Neuropeptide Y also known as NPY is a hormone that encourages eating and decreases metabolic rate. Blood levels of NPY are elevated in patients with anorexia nervosa, and studies have shown that injection of this hormone into the brain of rats with restricted food intake increases their time spent running on a wheel. Normally the hormone stimulates eating in healthy patients, but under conditions of starvation it increases their activity rate, probably to increase the chance of finding food. The increased levels of NPY in the blood of patients with eating disorders can in some ways explain the instances of extreme over-exercising found in most anorexia nervosa patients.
- Leptin and ghrelin: leptin is a hormone produced primarily by the fat cells in the body; it has an inhibitory effect on appetite by inducing a feeling of satiety. Ghrelin is an appetite inducing hormone produced in the stomach and the upper portion of the small intestine. Circulating levels of both hormones are an important factor in weight control. While often associated with obesity, both hormones and their respective effects have been implicated in the pathophysiology of anorexia nervosa and bulimia nervosa. Leptin can also be used to distinguish between constitutional thinness found in a healthy person with a low BMI and an individual with anorexia nervosa.
- Gut bacteria and immune system: studies have shown that a majority of patients with anorexia nervosa and bulimia nervosa have elevated levels of autoantibodies that affect hormones and neuropeptides that regulate appetite control and the stress response. There may be a direct correlation between autoantibody levels and associated psychological traits. Later study revealed that autoantibodies reactive with alpha-MSH are, in fact, generated against ClpB, a protein produced by certain gut bacteria e.g. Escherichia coli. ClpB protein was identified as a conformational antigen-mimetic of alpha-MSH. In patients with eating disorders plasma levels of anti-ClpB IgG and IgM correlated with patients' psychological traits
- Infection: PANDAS is an abbreviation for the controversial Pediatric Autoimmune Neuropsychiatric Disorders Associated with Streptococcal Infections hypothesis. Children with PANDAS are postulated to "have obsessive-compulsive disorder (OCD) and/or tic disorders such as Tourette syndrome, and in whom symptoms worsen following infections such as strep throat". (NIMH) PANDAS and the broader PANS are hypothesized to be a precipitating factor in the development of anorexia nervosa in some cases, (PANDAS AN).
- Lesions: studies have shown that lesions to the right frontal lobe or temporal lobe can cause the pathological symptoms of an eating disorder.
- Tumors: tumors in various regions of the brain have been implicated in the development of abnormal eating patterns.
- Brain calcification: a study highlights a case in which prior calcification of the right thalamus may have contributed to development of anorexia nervosa.
- Somatosensory homunculus: is the representation of the body located in the somatosensory cortex, first described by renowned neurosurgeon Wilder Penfield. The illustration was originally termed "Penfield's Homunculus", homunculus meaning little man. "In normal development this representation should adapt as the body goes through its pubertal growth spurt. However, in AN it is hypothesized that there is a lack of plasticity in this area, which may result in impairments of sensory processing and distortion of body image". (Bryan Lask, also proposed by VS Ramachandran)
- Obstetric complications: There have been studies done which show maternal smoking, obstetric and perinatal complications such as maternal anemia, very pre-term birth (less than 32 weeks), being born small for gestational age, neonatal cardiac problems, preeclampsia, placental infarction and sustaining a cephalhematoma at birth increase the risk factor for developing either anorexia nervosa or bulimia nervosa. Some of this developmental risk as in the case of placental infarction, maternal anemia and cardiac problems may cause intrauterine hypoxia, umbilical cord occlusion or cord prolapse may cause ischemia, resulting in cerebral injury, the prefrontal cortex in the fetus and neonate is highly susceptible to damage as a result of oxygen deprivation which has been shown to contribute to executive dysfunction, ADHD, and may affect personality traits associated with both eating disorders and comorbid disorders such as impulsivity, mental rigidity and obsessionality. The problem of perinatal brain injury, in terms of the costs to society and to the affected individuals and their families, is extraordinary. (Yafeng Dong, PhD)
- Symptom of starvation: Evidence suggests that the symptoms of eating disorders are actually symptoms of the starvation itself, not of a mental disorder. In a study involving thirty-six healthy young men that were subjected to semi-starvation, the men soon began displaying symptoms commonly found in patients with eating disorders. In this study, the healthy men ate approximately half of what they had become accustomed to eating and soon began developing symptoms and thought patterns (preoccupation with food and eating, ritualistic eating, impaired cognitive ability, other physiological changes such as decreased body temperature) that are characteristic symptoms of anorexia nervosa. The men used in the study also developed hoarding and obsessive collecting behaviors, even though they had no use for the items, which revealed a possible connection between eating disorders and obsessive–compulsive disorder.

== Diagnosis ==
There are many medical disorders that mimic eating disorders and comorbid psychiatric disorders. Early detection and intervention can assure a better recovery and can improve the quality of life of these patients. In the past 30 years, eating disorders have become increasingly conspicuous and it is uncertain whether the changes in presentation reflect a true increase. Anorexia nervosa and bulimia nervosa are the most clearly defined subgroups of a wider range of eating disorders. Many patients present with subthreshold expressions of the two main diagnoses: others with different patterns and symptoms.

As eating disorders, especially anorexia nervosa, are thought of as being associated with young, white females, diagnosis of eating disorders in other races happens more rarely. In one study, when clinicians were presented with identical case studies demonstrating disordered eating symptoms in Black, Hispanic, and white women, 44% noted the white woman's behavior as problematic; 41% identified the Hispanic woman's behavior as problematic, and only 17% of the clinicians noted the Black woman's behavior as problematic (Gordon, Brattole, Wingate, & Joiner, 2006).

=== Medical ===
The diagnostic workup typically includes complete medical and psychosocial history and follows a rational and formulaic approach to the diagnosis. Neuroimaging using fMRI, MRI, PET and SPECT scans have been used to detect cases in which a lesion, tumor or other organic condition has been either the sole causative or contributory factor in an eating disorder. "Right frontal intracerebral lesions with their close relationship to the limbic system could be causative for eating disorders, we therefore recommend performing a cranial MRI in all patients with suspected eating disorders" (Trummer M et al. 2002), "intracranial pathology should also be considered however certain is the diagnosis of early-onset anorexia nervosa. Second, neuroimaging plays an important part in diagnosing early-onset anorexia nervosa, both from a clinical and a research prospective".(O'Brien et al. 2001).

=== Psychological ===
Eating Disorder Specific Psychometric Tests
Eating Attitudes Test	SCOFF questionnaire
Body Attitudes Test	Body Attitudes Questionnaire
Eating Disorder Inventory	Eating Disorder Examination Interview

After ruling out organic causes and the initial diagnosis of an eating disorder being made by a medical professional, a trained mental health professional aids in the assessment and treatment of the underlying psychological components of the eating disorder and any comorbid psychological conditions. The clinician conducts a clinical interview and may employ various psychometric tests. Some are general in nature while others were devised specifically for use in the assessment of eating disorders. Some of the general tests that may be used are the Hamilton Depression Rating Scale and the Beck Depression Inventory. longitudinal research showed that there is an increase in chance that a young adult female would develop bulimia due to their current psychological pressure and as the person ages and matures, their emotional problems change or are resolved and then the symptoms decline.

Several types of scales are currently used – (a) self-report questionnaires –EDI-3, BSQ, TFEQ, MAC, BULIT-R, QEWP-R, EDE-Q, EAT, NEQ – and other; (b) semi-structured interviews – SCID-I, EDE – and other; (c) clinical interviews unstructured or observer-based rating scales- Morgan Russel scale The majority of the scales used were described and used in adult populations. From all the scales evaluated and analyzed, only three are described at the child population – it is EAT-26 (children above 16 years), EDI-3 (children above 13 years), and ANSOCQ (children above 13 years). It is essential to develop specific scales for people under 18 years of age, given the increasing incidence of ED among children and the need for early detection and appropriate intervention. Moreover, the urgent need for accurate scales and telemedicine testing and diagnosis tools are of high importance during the COVID-19 pandemic (Leti, Garner & al., 2020).

=== Differential diagnoses ===
There are multiple medical conditions which may be misdiagnosed as a primary psychiatric disorder, complicating or delaying treatment. These may have a synergistic effect on conditions which mimic an eating disorder or on a properly diagnosed eating disorder.

- Lyme disease is known as the "great imitator", as it may present as a variety of psychiatric or neurological disorders including anorexia nervosa.
- Gastrointestinal diseases, such as celiac disease, Crohn's disease, peptic ulcer, eosinophilic esophagitis or non-celiac gluten sensitivity, among others. Celiac disease is also known as the "great imitator", because it may involve several organs and cause an extensive variety of non-gastrointestinal symptoms, such as psychiatric and neurological disorders, including anorexia nervosa.
- Addison's disease is a disorder of the adrenal cortex which results in decreased hormonal production. Addison's disease, even in subclinical form may mimic many of the symptoms of anorexia nervosa.
- Gastric adenocarcinoma is one of the most common forms of cancer in the world. Complications due to this condition have been misdiagnosed as an eating disorder.
- Hypothyroidism, hyperthyroidism, hypoparathyroidism and hyperparathyroidism may mimic some of the symptoms of, can occur concurrently with, be masked by or exacerbate an eating disorder.
- Toxoplasma seropositivity: even in the absence of symptomatic toxoplasmosis, toxoplasma gondii exposure has been linked to changes in human behavior and psychiatric disorders including those comorbid with eating disorders such as depression. In reported case studies the response to antidepressant treatment improved only after adequate treatment for toxoplasma.
- Neurosyphilis: It is estimated that there may be up to one million cases of untreated syphilis in the US alone. "The disease can present with psychiatric symptoms alone, psychiatric symptoms that can mimic any other psychiatric illness". Many of the manifestations may appear atypical. Up to 1.3% of short term psychiatric admissions may be attributable to neurosyphilis, with a much higher rate in the general psychiatric population. (Ritchie, M Perdigao J,)
- Dysautonomia: a wide variety of autonomic nervous system (ANS) disorders may cause a wide variety of psychiatric symptoms including anxiety, panic attacks and depression. Dysautonomia usually involves failure of sympathetic or parasympathetic components of the ANS system but may also include excessive ANS activity. Dysautonomia can occur in conditions such as diabetes and alcoholism.

==== Psychological disorders which may be confused with an eating disorder, or be co-morbid with one ====
- Emetophobia is an anxiety disorder characterized by an intense fear of vomiting. A person so impacted may develop rigorous standards of food hygiene, such as not touching food with their hands. They may become socially withdrawn to avoid situations which in their perception may make them vomit. Many who have emetophobia are diagnosed with anorexia nervosa or self-starvation. In severe cases of emetophobia they may drastically reduce their food intake.
- Phagophobia is an anxiety disorder characterized by a fear of eating, it is usually initiated by an adverse experience while eating such as choking or vomiting. Persons with this disorder may present with complaints of pain while swallowing.
- Body dysmorphic disorder (BDD) is listed as an obsessive-compulsive disorder that affects up to 2% of the population. BDD is characterized by excessive rumination over an actual or perceived physical flaw. BDD has been diagnosed equally among men and women. While BDD has been misdiagnosed as anorexia nervosa, it also occurs comorbidly in 39% of eating disorder cases. BDD is a chronic and debilitating condition which may lead to social isolation, major depression and suicidal ideation and attempts. Neuroimaging studies to measure response to facial recognition have shown activity predominately in the left hemisphere in the left lateral prefrontal cortex, lateral temporal lobe and left parietal lobe showing hemispheric imbalance in information processing. There is a reported case of the development of BDD in a 21-year-old male following an inflammatory brain process. Neuroimaging showed the presence of a new atrophy in the frontotemporal region.
- Gender dysphoria is a psychiatric diagnosis that is often a result of the psychological distress that arises within the differences of sex at birth and gender identity. Distress can manifest in different ways including discomfort with one's physical sex characteristics or a desire to be recognized as a different gender as well as treated as such. According to the American Psychiatric Association, the diagnosis is not based only on gender diversity, but instead on the significant distress that accompanies these individuals. Gender dysphoria can occur at different stages of life and its intensity can vary amongst individuals. Although, not all transgender individuals experience gender dysphoria.

== Prevention ==
Prevention aims to promote a healthy development before the occurrence of eating disorders. It also intends early identification of an eating disorder before it is too late to treat. Children as young as ages 5–7 are aware of the cultural messages regarding body image and dieting. Prevention comes in bringing these issues to the light. The following topics can be discussed with young children (as well as teens and young adults).

- Emotional Bites: a simple way to discuss emotional eating is to ask children about why they might eat besides being hungry. Talk about more effective ways to cope with emotions, emphasizing the value of sharing feelings with a trusted adult.
- Say No to Teasing: another concept is to emphasize that it is wrong to say hurtful things about other people's body sizes.
- Intuitive Eating: emphasize the importance of listening to one's body. That is, eat when you are hungry, pay attention to fullness, and choose foods that make you feel good. Children intuitively grasp these concepts. Additionally, parents can reinforce intuitive eating by removing value judgments of food as "good" or "bad" from conversations about food.
- Positive Body Talk: family members can help prevent eating disorders by not making negative comments about themselves, and by speaking positively about all body types, without euphemism or shame involved. When children hear family members complain that they are fat or about the proportions of their bodies, this influences their own body image and is a contributing factor to the development of eating disorders.
- Fitness Comes in All Sizes: educate children about the genetics of body size and the normal changes occurring in the body. Discuss their fears and hopes about growing bigger. Focus on fitness and a balanced diet.

Internet and modern technologies provide new opportunities for prevention. Online programs have the potential to increase the use of prevention programs. The development and practice of prevention programs via online sources make it possible to reach a wide range of people at minimal cost. Such an approach can also make prevention programs to be sustainable.

Parents can do a lot for their children at a young age to impede them from ever seeing themselves in the eyes of an eating disorder. The parents who are actively engaged in their children's lives' often contribute to fostering a stronger sense of self-love in them.

== Treatment ==
Treatment varies according to type and severity of eating disorder, and often more than one treatment option is utilized. Various forms of cognitive behavioral therapy have been developed for eating disorders and found to be useful. If a person is experiencing comorbidity between an eating disorder and OCD, exposure and response prevention, coupled with weight restoration and serotonin reuptake inhibitors has proven effective. Other forms of psychotherapies can also be useful. Research additionally indicates that mindfulness-based interventions can be effective for different types of eating disorders.

Family doctors play an important role in early treatment of people with eating disorders by encouraging those who are also reluctant to see a psychiatrist. Treatment can take place in a variety of different settings such as community programs, hospitals, day programs, and groups. The American Psychiatric Association (APA) recommends a team approach to treatment of eating disorders. The members of the team are usually a psychiatrist, therapist, and registered dietitian, but other clinicians may be included.

That said, some treatment methods are:

- Cognitive behavioral therapy (CBT), which postulates that an individual's feelings and behaviors are caused by their own thoughts instead of external stimuli such as other people, situations or events; the idea is to change how a person thinks and reacts to a situation even if the situation itself does not change. See Cognitive behavioral treatment of eating disorders.
  - Acceptance and commitment therapy: a type of CBT
  - Cognitive behavioral therapy enhanced (CBT-E): the most widespread cognitive behavioral psychotherapy specific for eating disorders
  - Cognitive remediation therapy (CRT), a set of cognitive drills or compensatory interventions designed to enhance cognitive functioning.
  - Exposure and Response Prevention: a type of CBT; the gradual exposure to anxiety provoking situations in a safe environment, to learn how to deal with the uncomfortableness
- The Maudsley anorexia nervosa treatment for adults (MANTRA), which focuses on addressing rigid information processing styles, emotional avoidance, pro-anorectic beliefs, and difficulties with interpersonal relationships. These four targets of treatment are proposed to be core maintenance factors within the Cognitive-Interpersonal Maintenance Model of anorexia nervosa.
- Dialectical behavior therapy
- Family therapy including "conjoint family therapy" (CFT), "separated family therapy" (SFT) and Maudsley Family Therapy.
- Behavioral therapy: focuses on gaining control and changing unwanted behaviors.
- Interpersonal psychotherapy (IPT)
- Cognitive Emotional Behaviour Therapy (CEBT)
- Nutrition counseling and Medical nutrition therapy
- Self-help and guided self-help have been shown to be helpful in AN, BN and BED; this includes support groups and self-help groups such as Eating Disorders Anonymous and Overeaters Anonymous. Having meaningful relationships are often a way to recovery. Having a partner, friend or someone else close in your life may lead away from the way of problematic eating according to professor Cynthia M. Bulik.
- psychoanalytic psychotherapy
- Inpatient care
- Specialist Supportive Clinical Management (SSCM)

There are few studies on the cost-effectiveness of the various treatments. Treatment can be expensive; due to limitations in health care coverage, people hospitalized with anorexia nervosa may be discharged while still underweight, resulting in relapse and rehospitalization. Research has found comorbidity between an eating disorder (e.g., anorexia nervosa, bulimia nervosa, and binge eating) and OCD does not impact the length of the time patients spend in treatment, but can negatively impact treatment outcomes.

For children with anorexia nervosa, the only well-established treatment is the family treatment-behavior. For other eating disorders in children, however, there is no well-established treatments, though family treatment-behavior has been used in treating bulimia.

A 2019 Cochrane review examined studies comparing the effectiveness of inpatient versus outpatient models of care for eating disorders. Four trials including 511 participants were studied but the review was unable to draw any definitive conclusions as to the superiority of one model over another.

=== Barriers to treatment ===
A variety of barriers to eating disorder treatment have been identified, typically grouped into individual and systemic barriers. Individual barriers include shame, fear of stigma, cultural perceptions, minimizing the seriousness of the problem, unfamiliarity with mental health services, and a lack of trust in mental health professionals. Systemic barriers include language differences, financial limitations, lack of insurance coverage, inaccessible health care facilities, time conflicts, long waits, lack of transportation, and lack of child care. These barriers may be particularly exacerbated for those who identify outside of the skinny, white, affluent girl stereotype that dominates in the field of eating disorders, such that those who do not identify with this stereotype are much less likely to seek treatment.

Conditions during the COVID-19 pandemic may have increased the difficulties experienced by those with eating disorders, and the risk that otherwise healthy individuals may develop eating disorders. The pandemic was a stressful life event for people during the time, increasing anxiety and isolation, disrupting normal routines, creating economic strain and food insecurity, and making it more difficult and stressful to obtain needed resources including food and medical treatment. The COVID-19 pandemic in England exposed a dramatic rise in demand for eating disorder services which the English NHS struggled to meet. The National Institute for Health and Care Excellence and NHS England both advised that services should not impose thresholds using body mass index or duration of illness to determine whether treatment for eating disorders should be offered, but there were continuing reports that these recommendations were not followed.

In terms of access to treatment, therapy sessions generally switched from in-person to video calls during the pandemic. This may have actually helped people who previously had difficulty finding a therapist with experience in treating eating disorders, for example, those who live in rural areas. Studies suggest that virtual (telehealth) CBT can be as effective as face-to-face CBT for bulimia and other mental illnesses. To help patients cope with conditions during the pandemic, therapists may have had to particularly emphasize strategies to create structure where little is present, build interpersonal connections, and identify and avoid triggers.

=== Medication ===
Orlistat is used in obesity treatment. Olanzapine seems to promote weight gain as well as the ability to ameliorate obsessional behaviors concerning weight gain. zinc supplements have been shown to be helpful, and cortisol is also being investigated.

Two pharmaceuticals, Prozac and Vyvanse, have been approved by the FDA to treat bulimia nervosa and binge-eating disorder, respectively. Olanzapine has also been used off-label to treat anorexia nervosa. Studies are also underway to explore psychedelic and psychedelic-adjacent medicines such as MDMA, psilocybin and ketamine for anorexia nervosa and binge-eating disorder.

== Outcomes ==
For anorexia nervosa, bulimia nervosa, and binge eating disorder, there is a general agreement that full recovery rates range between 50% and 85%, with larger proportions of people experiencing at least partial remission. It can be a lifelong struggle or it can be overcome within months.

- Relapse: An individual who is in remission from BN and EDNOS (Eating Disorder Not Otherwise Specified) is at a high risk of falling back into the habit of self-harm. Factors such as high stress regarding their job, pressures from society, as well as other occurrences that inflict stress on a person, can push a person back to what they feel will ease the pain. A study tracked a group of selected people that were either diagnosed with BN or EDNOS for 60 months. After the 60 months were complete, the researchers recorded whether or not the person was having a relapse. The results found that the probability of a person previously diagnosed with EDNOS had a 41% chance of relapsing; a person with BN had a 47% chance.
- Attachment insecurity: People who are showing signs of attachment anxiety will most likely have trouble communicating their emotional status as well as having trouble seeking effective social support. Signs that a person has adopted this symptom include not showing recognition to their caregiver or when he/she is feeling pain. In a clinical sample, it is clear that at the pretreatment step of a patient's recovery, more severe eating disorder symptoms directly corresponds to higher attachment anxiety. The more this symptom increases, the more difficult it is to achieve eating disorder reduction prior to treatment.
- Impaired Decision Making: Studies have found mixed results on the relationship between eating disorders and decision making. Researchers have continuously found that patients with anorexia nervosa were less capable of thinking about long-term consequences of their decisions when completing the Iowa Gambling Task, a test designed to measure a person's decision-making capabilities. Consequently, they were at a higher risk of making hastier, harmful choices.

Anorexia nervosa symptoms include the increasing chance of getting osteoporosis. Thinning of the hair as well as dry hair and skin are also very common. The muscles of the heart will also start to change if no treatment is inflicted on the patient. This causes the heart to have an abnormally slow heart rate along with low blood pressure. Heart failure becomes a major consideration when this begins to occur. Muscles throughout the body begin to lose their strength. This will cause the individual to begin feeling faint, drowsy, and weak. Along with these symptoms, the body will begin to grow a layer of hair called lanugo. The human body does this in response to the lack of heat and insulation due to the low percentage of body fat.

Bulimia symptoms include heart problems like an irregular heartbeat that can lead to heart failure and death may occur. This occurs because of the electrolyte imbalance that is a result of the constant binge and purge process. The probability of a gastric rupture increases. A gastric rupture is when there is a sudden rupture of the stomach lining that can be fatal. The acids that are contained in the vomit can cause a rupture in the esophagus as well as tooth decay. As a result, to laxative abuse, irregular bowel movements may occur along with constipation. Sores along the lining of the stomach called peptic ulcers begin to appear and the chance of developing pancreatitis increases.

Binge eating symptoms include high blood pressure, which can cause heart disease if it is not treated. Many patients recognize an increase in the levels of cholesterol. The chance of being diagnosed with gallbladder disease increases, which affects an individual's digestive tract.

=== Outcomes in Pregnancy ===
Miscarriages: Pregnant women with a binge eating disorder have shown to have a greater chance of having a miscarriage compared to pregnant women with any other eating disorders. According to a study done, out of a group of pregnant women being evaluated, 46.7% of the pregnancies ended with a miscarriage in women that were diagnosed with BED, with 23.0% in the control. In the same study, 21.4% of women diagnosed with Bulimia Nervosa had their pregnancies end with miscarriages and only 17.7% of the controls.

Eating disorders of all types are associated with increased risk of adverse outcomes, including intrauterine growth restriction, preterm birth, low birth weight, and labor complications.

=== Risk of death ===
Death rates from eating disorders, OWID

Eating disorders result in about 7,000 deaths a year as of 2010, making them the mental illnesses with the highest mortality rate. Anorexia nervosa has a risk of death that is increased about 5 fold with 20% of these deaths as a result of suicide. Rates of death in bulimia and other disorders are similar at about a 2 fold increase.

The mortality rate for those with anorexia nervosa is 5.4 per 1000 individuals per year. Roughly 1.3 deaths were due to suicide. A person who is or had been in an inpatient setting had a rate of 4.6 deaths per 1000. Of individuals with bulimia about 2 persons per 1000 persons die per year and among those with EDNOS about 3.3 per 1000 people die per year.

== Epidemiology ==
It is a common misconception that eating disorders are restricted only to women, and this may have skewed research disproportionately to study female populations. Lifetime eating disorder prevalence is 8.4% for women, 2.2% for men. Additionally, lifetime prevalence is 10.5% in trans men and 8.1% in trans women in the United States. and In the developed world, binge eating disorder affects about 1.6% of women and 0.8% of men in a given year. Anorexia nervosa affects about 0.4% and bulimia affects about 1.3% of young women in a given year. Up to 4% of women have anorexia nervosa, 2% have bulimia, and 2% have binge eating disorder at some point in time. Anorexia nervosa and bulimia nervosa occur nearly ten times more often in females than males. Typically, they begin in late childhood or early adulthood. Rates of other eating disorders are not clear. Rates of eating disorders appear to be lower in less developed countries.

In the United States, twenty million women and ten million men have an eating disorder at least once in their lifetime.

=== Anorexia Nervosa ===
Lifetime prevalence of anorexia nervosa ranges from 0.1-3.6% in women from 0-0.3% of men. The incidence of female cases is low in general medicine or specialized consultation in town, ranging from 4.2 and 8.3/100,000 individuals per year. The incidence of AN ranges from 109 to 270/100,000 individuals per year. Mortality varies according to the population considered. AN has one of the highest mortality rates among mental illnesses. The rates observed are 6.2 to 10.6 times greater than those observed in the general population for follow-up periods ranging from 13 to 10 years. Standardized mortality ratios for anorexia nervosa vary from 1.36% to 20%.

=== Bulimia ===
Lifetime prevalence of bulimia nervosa ranges from 0.3–4.6% in women and 0.1–1.3% in men. About 2-3% of women are currently affected in the United States. New cases occur in about 12 per 100,000 population per year. The standardized mortality ratios for bulimia is 1% to 3%.

=== Binge eating disorder ===
Lifetime rates of BED range from 0.6–5.8% for women and 0.3–2.0% in men. Reported rates vary from 1.3 to 30% among subjects seeking weight-loss treatment. Based on surveys, 0.1-1% of people are affected by BED in a given year. BED is more common among females than males. There have been no published studies investigating the effects of BED on mortality, although it is comorbid with disorders that are known to increase mortality risks.

== Economics ==
- Since 2017, the number of cost-effectiveness studies regarding eating disorders appears to be increasing in the past six years.
- In 2011 United States dollars, annual healthcare costs were $1,869 greater among individuals with eating disorders compared to the general population. The added presence of mental health comorbidities was also associated with higher, but not statistically significant, costs difference of $1,993.
- In 2013 Canadian dollars, the total hospital cost per admission for treatment of anorexia nervosa was $51,349 and the total societal cost was $54,932 based on an average length of stay of 37.9 days. For every unit increase in body mass index, there was also a 15.7% decrease in hospital cost.
- For Ontario, Canada patients who received specialized inpatient care for an eating disorder both out of country and in province, annual total healthcare costs were about $11 million before 2007 and $6.5 million in the years afterwards. For those treated out of country alone, costs were about $5 million before 2007 and $2 million in the years afterwards.

== Evolutionary perspective ==
Evolutionary psychiatry as an emerging scientific discipline has been studying mental disorders from an evolutionary perspective. If eating disorders have evolutionary functions or if they are new modern "lifestyle" problems is still debated.

== See also ==
- Eating disorders in Chinese women
- Eating disorder not otherwise specified
- Fatphobia
- Feeding disorder
