= Body Attitudes Test =

- Purpose: assessment of eating disorder

The Body Attitudes Test (BAT) was developed by Probst et al. in 1995. It was designed for the assessment of multiple eating disorders in women. The BAT measures an individual's subjective body experience and attitudes towards one's own body. It is a questionnaire composed of twenty items which yields four different factors that evaluate the internal view of the patient's own body.

== Purpose ==
The BAT is used to evaluate self-reported outlooks women with eating disorders have pre-, during, and post-treatment. It has been proven to highlight the psychological changes experienced throughout the rehabilitation process and is a useful way to gauge adherence and success of treatment.

This test also has the ability to differentiated between clinical and non-clinical subjects and between anorexics and bulimics. Studies have shown that patients with restrictive anorexia have lower BAT scores, whereas patients with bulimia nervosa score higher.

== History ==
Michel Probst and colleagues began creating the BAT in 1984 and eventually published this questionnaire in 1995, with the goal of finding a new tool to evaluate how women with eating disorders view their own body. The BAT was originally written in Dutch and then translated to many languages. This test was administered widely to both patients and control subjects, including women already diagnosed with eating disorders, women participating in Weight Watchers, and healthy women with no eating disorder diagnosis. To ensure the validity of this test, Probst and colleagues compared the results of the BAT to other tools already in use to evaluate women with eating disorders. These other evaluations include the Body Shape Questionnaire (BSQ), the Eating Disorder Inventory (EDI), and the Eating Attitudes Test (EAT).

== Test ==
The BAT is a self-reported questionnaire consisting of 20 questions. Patients are asked to score each statement 0–5, 0 meaning they do not relate to the statement at all, and 5 meaning the statement frequently describes their sentiment. The following are examples of questions asked in the assessment:

1. I feel displeased when comparing my body to others.
2. I do not recognize my body as my own.
3. My body is too wide.
4. I am pleased with my body shape.
5. I feel the need to lose weight.
6. I see my breasts as too big.
7. I feel the need to conceal my body in looser clothing.
8. I avoid my reflection because it upsets me.
9. I do not struggle with relaxing.
10. I feel like every aspect of my body is broad.
11. My body negatively weighs on me.
12. There is a dissonance between my body and I.
13. At times, I feel like my body is swollen.
14. I feel threatened by my physical appearance.
15. I take great pride in my body size.
16. I feel like I look pregnant.
17. I always feel very tense.
18. I tend to be jealous of other people's looks.
19. Aspects of my physical appearance scare me.
20. I often scrutinize my own reflection.

The answers to these questions are then analyzed and provide information regarding four factors that evaluate the patient's subjective view on their body:

- negative appreciation of body size
- lack of familiarity with one's own body
- general body dissatisfaction
- rest factor

== See also ==
- Body Attitudes Questionnaire
- Eating Disorder Diagnostic Scale
- SCOFF questionnaire
