= Night eating syndrome =

Eating disorder

- Specialty: Psychiatry
- Complications: Obesity
- Frequency: 1–2% (general population), approximately 10% of overweight individuals

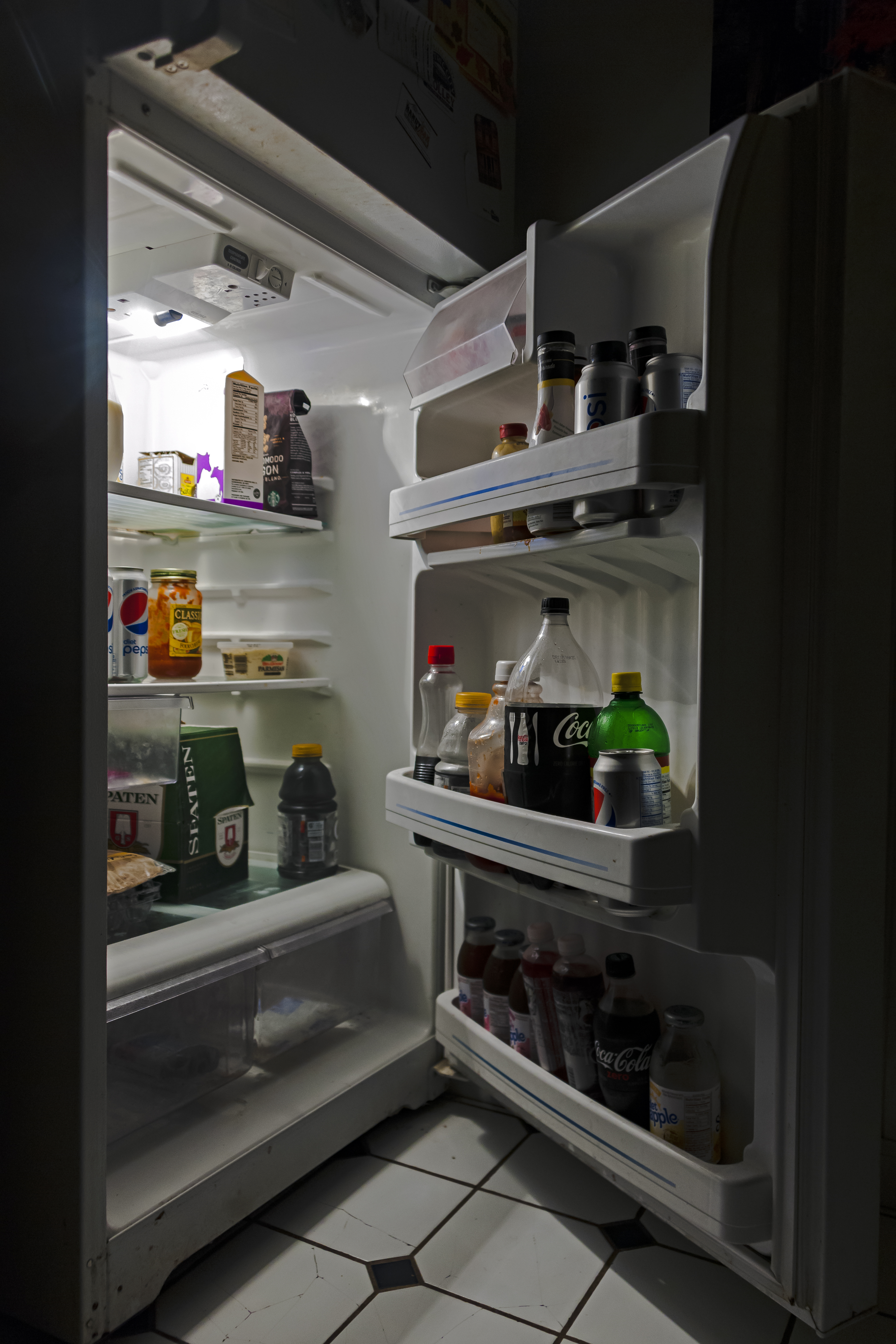
Open refrigerator at night

Night eating syndrome (NES) is classified as an Other Specified Feeding or Eating Disorder (OSFED) under the Diagnostic and Statistical Manual of Mental Disorders, Fifth Edition (DSM-5). It involves recurrent episodes of night eating after awakening from sleep or after the evening meal. Awareness and recall of the eating is present, which is a key characteristic that differentiates the disorder from Sleep-Related Eating Disorder (SRED). Although there is some degree of comorbidity with binge eating disorder (BED), it differs from binge eating in that the amount of food consumed in the night is not necessarily objectively large nor is a loss of control over food intake required. The syndrome causes significant distress or functional impairment and cannot be better explained by external influences such as changes in the sleep-wake cycle, social norms, substance use, medication, or another mental or medical disorder.

== History ==
NES was originally described by Albert Stunkard in 1955 and is currently included in the other specified feeding or eating disorder (OSFED) category of the DSM-5. Most of the updated literature relating to NES has been published in recent years due to its recent changes in the DSM-5.

== Epidemiology ==
NES affects both men and women, between 1 and 2% of the general population, and approximately 10% of obese individuals. Newer research suggests that the overall prevalence of NES ranges from 2.8% to 15.2% in clinical patients with eating disorders, obesity, and/or bariatric surgery.

Previously, the age of onset was typically in early adulthood (spanning from late teenage years to late twenties) and was often long-lasting, with children rarely reporting NES. However, newer studies have suggested that age is not a risk factor for NES, yet this evidence is still lacking.

Other social-demographic factors such as income, gender, education level, children, living with a romantic partner, and smoking levels do not have an effect on NES. Furthermore, there have been contradictory conclusions on whether a higher BMI is a risk factor of NES, or if it is simply a consequence of night eating behavior.

There has been no specific statistics regarding NES and mortality.

== Comorbidities ==
NES has a substantial association with medical diagnoses such as obesity, sleep apnea, hypercholesterolemia, polyendocrine metabolic ovarian syndrome (PMOS), and diabetes mellitus type II (T2DM), and psychiatric diagnoses such as binge eating disorder, anorexia nervosa, bulimia nervosa, generalized anxiety disorder, major depressive disorder, and substance use disorders.

In contrast to eating disorders like anorexia nervosa, NES does not necessarily depend on a person's Body Mass Index (BMI). It can occur in individuals with a weight considered normal for their age and height but is most commonly observed and studied in those with obesity. In fact, NES has been found to be a risk factor for an earlier onset of obesity. NES is most commonly comorbid with excess weight; as many as 28% of individuals seeking gastric bypass surgery were found to have NES in one study. Night eating syndrome has also been associated with diabetic complications.

Many people with NES also experience depressed mood, post-traumatic stress disorder, and anxiety disorders. People with NES have been shown to have higher scores for depression and low self-esteem. NES may also have an association with personality traits, such as harm avoidance, self-directedness, and impulsivity.

It has been demonstrated that nocturnal levels of the hormones melatonin and leptin are decreased. Individuals tend to have poorer sleep quality and higher levels of insomnia.

Often times, people with NES are unaware of their condition due to it often being overshadowed by other comorbidities.

== Diagnosis ==
Specific research diagnostic criteria have been proposed outside of the DSM-5 and include:

(A) Evening hyperphagia (consumption of 25% or more of the total daily calories after the evening meal) and/or nocturnal awakening and ingestion of food two or more times per week.

(B) Awareness of the night eating to differentiate it from the parasomnia sleep-related eating disorder (SRED).

(C) Three of five associated symptoms must also be present: lack of appetite in the morning, urges to eat at night, belief that one must eat in order to fall back to sleep at night, depressed mood, and/or difficulty sleeping.

(D) The eating pattern causes significant distress or interferes with daily functioning.

(E) The disordered pattern of eating has been maintained for at least 3 months.

(F) The pattern is not attributable to substance use, medical conditions, medication, or another psychiatric disorder.

=== Testing ===
When an eating disorder (ED) is suspected, health professionals should test using a validated tool: the Night Eating Questionnaire (NEQ), the Night Eating Diagnostic Questionnaire (NEDQ), the Eating Disorder Examination Questionnaire (EDE-Q), the Night Eating Syndrome History and Inventory (NESHI), or the Eating Among Teens Survey (EAT-II).

== Differential diagnosis ==
BED and NES are often considered similar due to their prevalence in individuals with obesity and association with depressive symptoms. However, key distinctions are highlighted, particularly in eating patterns. While BED usually involves a loss of control over eating with large meal portions, NES is usually characterized by controlled, smaller snacks eaten at unusual times, such as late at night or after dinner. Another key difference between the two disorders is that depressive symptoms fully mediated the link between BED and food insecurity, whereas for NES, depressive symptoms only partially mediated this relationship.

The relationship between NES and SRED is in need of further clarification. A significant debate in the literature concerns the classification of NES as an eating disorder, particularly due to its symptom overlap with SRED. Both NES and SRED involve nightly binge eating, weight gain, and sleep disturbances. Both conditions are more common in women and often coexist with mood disorders. Some researchers argue that the similarities between these disorders suggest they may, in fact, be the same condition viewed from different perspectives. The primary distinction noted is the level of consciousness during night eating episodes: NES patients are fully aware of their eating, whereas SRED patients may have partial or no awareness. There is debate as to whether these should be viewed as separate diseases, or part of a continuum.

== Treatment ==
A few treatment modalities are available for NES patients. These include pharmacotherapy, bariatric surgery, bright light therapy (BLT), and progressive muscle relaxation (PMR). In randomised control trials, medications have shown mixed results in reducing night eating symptoms, with sertraline demonstrating the most significant improvements. Bariatric surgery has been found to reduce NES-related dysfunction in post-operative functioning. Exposing NES participants to 10,000 lux light for 60 minutes each morning over 14 consecutive sessions was shown to reduce their NES symptoms, improve mood, and alleviate insomnia. Research also showed a 30% decrease in food intake after dinner among participants who practiced PMR, along with a reduction in depressive and anxiety symptoms.

Due to NES sharing similarities with mood disorders, SRED, and EDs, NES management may benefit from targeting disordered eating patterns, emotional regulation, and poor sleeping habits. Furthermore, research shows that a considerable proportion of adults with pre-existing T2DM having a clinical ED. Thus, the impact of newer appetite-suppressing diabetes treatments, along with the growing use of very low-calorie diets and bariatric surgery in T2DM management, further underscores the importance of screening for and diagnosing NES early.

Consuming foods containing serotonin has been suggested to aid in the treatment of NES, but other research indicates that diet by itself cannot appreciably raise serotonin levels in the brain. A few foods (for example, bananas) contain serotonin, but they do not affect brain serotonin levels. Various foods contain tryptophan, but the extent to which they affect brain serotonin levels must be further explored scientifically before conclusions can be drawn.

Considering the complexity of NES, treatment should be tailored to each individual, integrating psychoeducation on diet, nutrition, and sleep with psychotherapy to achieve effective outcomes.

== See also ==
- Nocturnal sleep-related eating disorder
