= Eating Attitudes Test =

Questionnaire of symptoms and concerns characteristic of eating disorders

The Eating Attitudes Test (EAT, EAT-26), created by David Garner, is a widely used 26-item, standardized self-reported questionnaire of symptoms and concerns characteristic of eating disorders. The EAT is useful in assessing "eating disorder risk" in high school, college and other special risk samples such as athletes. EAT has been extremely effective in screening for anorexia nervosa in many populations.

The EAT-26 can be used in non-clinical as well as clinical settings not specifically focused on eating disorders. It can be administered in group or individual settings by mental health professionals, school counselors, coaches, camp counselors, and others with interest in gathering information to determine if an individual should be referred to a specialist for evaluation for an eating disorder. It is ideally suited for school settings, athletic programs, fitness centers, infertility clinics, pediatric practices, general practice settings, and outpatient psychiatric departments.

The EAT-26 uses a six-point scale based on how often the individual engages in specific behaviors. The questions may be answered: Always, Usually, Often, Sometimes, Rarely, and Never. Completing the EAT-26 yields a "referral index" based on three criteria: 1) the total score based on the answers to the EAT-26 questions; 2) answers to the behavioral questions related to eating symptoms and weight loss, and 3) the individual's body mass index (BMI) calculated from their height and weight. Generally, a referral is recommended if a respondent scores "positively" or meets the "cut off" scores or threshold on one or more criteria.

Permission to use the EAT-40 or EAT-26 can be obtained from David Garner through the EAT-26 website . Instructions, scoring, and interpretive information can be obtained from the EAT-26 website at no charge. Completion of the EAT-26 with anonymous feedback on the EAT-26 website is possible .

== Development and history ==
The original version of the EAT (EAT-40) was published in 1979, with 40 items each rated on a 6-point Likert scale. In 1982, Garner and colleagues modified the original version to create an abbreviated 26-item test. The items were reduced after a factor analysis on the original 40-item data set revealed 26 independent items. Since then, the EAT has been translated into many different languages and has gained widespread international as a tool to screen for eating disorders. Both the original paper and the subsequent 1982 publication are 3rd and 4th on the list of the 10 most cited articles in the history of the journal Psychological Medicine , a prominent peer-reviewed journal in the fields of psychology and psychiatry.

The EAT was developed for a study examining possible sociocultural factors contributing to the increased prevalence of anorexia nervosa and other milder variants of the disorder. This original study examined groups of highly competitive dance students and fashion models, who by career choice must focus increased attention and control over their body shapes. The EAT was used as a standardized measure of disturbed "eating attitudes" typical of anorexia nervosa. The study showed that significantly more dance students and fashion models scored above a cutoff score compared to those in a female non-clinical sample of college women. These findings were seen as support for the theory that sociocultural factors, emphasizing thinness as a marker for beauty and success for women, play a role in the increased incidence of anorexia nervosa observed in the "Twiggy era" of the 1970s and 1980s. The sociocultural hypothesis does not seem controversial today, but in the early 1980s, there was almost no mention of culture as a possible contributing factor in eating disorders. In 1998, the EAT was adopted by the National Eating Disorder Screening program based on recognition of a need for screening large populations of college and high school students for the purpose of early identification of anorexia nervosa related symptoms.

The EAT-26 is recommended as the first step in a two-stage screening process. Accordingly, individuals who score higher than a 20 should be referred to a qualified professional to determine if they meet the diagnostic criteria for an eating disorder. The EAT-26 is not designed to make a diagnosis of an eating disorder and should not be used in place of a professional diagnosis or consultation. The EAT should only be used as a screener for general eating disorders, as research has not shown it to be a valid instrument in making specific diagnoses.

== Limitations ==
The EAT suffers from the same problems as other self-report inventories, in that scores can be easily exaggerated or minimized by the person completing them. Like all questionnaires, the way the instrument is administered can have an effect on the final score. If a patient is asked to fill out the form in front of other people in a clinical environment, for instance, social expectations have been shown to elicit a different response compared to administration via a postal survey.

As the EAT was originally developed to screen subjects at high risk for anorexia nervosa (AN), it remains controversial whether its present items and scoring cut-off are well-suited to diagnosing other eating disorders. Although the EAT can adequately diagnose undifferentiated eating disorders in clinical settings, it may not fare well in settings unequipped to address major eating disorders.

While the EAT-26 has demonstrated good internal consistency, its test-retest reliability remains uncertain. The stability of an EAT-26 score has been demonstrated to be moderate over two years, but vulnerable to fluctuations over four years. This may be due to changes in an individual's eating behaviors and attitudes over time naturally or in response to receiving eating disorder treatment.

Another area of debate is the cut-off score of 20 first proposed by David Garner and colleagues to diagnose anorexia nervosa. High false-positive rates and low predictive power for screening for AN and bulimia nervosa (BN) in non-clinical settings have been reported. Use of the EAT-26 as a screening tool could also result in high false-negative rates in individuals with binge eating disorder (BED) or eating disorders not otherwise specified (EDNOS). Such rates may be due to changes over time in the DSM and ICD criteria for eating disorders from which the items in the EAT are based. Another explanation may be the EAT's inability to distinguish subthreshold forms of abnormal eating behavior from clinical eating disorders. Lowering the cut-off score to 11 has been demonstrated to improve sensibility and sensitivity rates in individuals with BN, BED, and EDNOS and presents a promising solution to the aforementioned issue.

== See also ==
=== Other assessments ===
- Body Attitudes Questionnaire
- Body Attitudes Test
- Eating Disorder Inventory
- SCOFF questionnaire
