= SCOFF questionnaire =

The SCOFF questionnaire utilizes an acronym in a simple five question test devised for use by non-professionals to assess the possible presence of an eating disorder. It was devised by Morgan et al. in 1999. The original SCOFF questionnaire was devised for use in the United Kingdom, thus the original acronym needs to be adjusted for users in the United States and Canada. The "S" in SCOFF stands for "Sick" which in British English means specifically to vomit. In American English and Canadian English it is synonymous with "ill". The "O" is used in the acronym to denote "one stone". A "stone" is an Imperial unit of weight which made up of 14 lbs (equivalent to 6.35 kg). The letters in the full acronym are taken from key words in the questions:

- Sick
- Control
- One stone (14 lbs/6.5 kg)
- Fat
- Food

== Scoring ==
One point is assigned for every "yes"; a score greater than two (≥2) indicates a possible case of anorexia nervosa or bulimia nervosa.

== See also ==
- Body Attitudes Questionnaire
- Body Attitudes Test
- Eating Attitudes Test
- Eating Disorder Examination Interview
- Eating Disorder Inventory
- Minnesota Eating Behavior Survey
