= Body Attitudes Questionnaire =

- Purpose: assessment of eating disorder

The Ben-Tovim Walker Body Attitudes Questionnaire (BAQ) is a 44 item self-report questionnaire divided into six subscales that measures a woman's attitude towards her own body. The BAQ is used in the assessment of eating disorders. It was devised by D.I. Ben-Tovim and M.K. Walker in 1991.

== Sub-scales ==
The six subscales measured by the BAQ are:

1. Overall fatness
2. Self disparagement
3. Strength
4. Salience of weight
5. Feelings of attractiveness
6. Consciousness of lower body fat

== Foreign-language versions ==
=== Portuguese version ===
The BAQ was the first body attitudes scale to be translated into Portuguese. The validity of the Portuguese language version was proven in a test conducted on a cohort of Brazilian women who speak Portuguese as their native language. The test-retest reliability was 0.57 and 0.85 after a one-month interval. The test was conducted by Scagliusi et al.

=== Japanese version ===
The BAQ was translated into Japanese and tested on 68 males and 139 females in Japan and 68 Japanese males living in Australia (Kagawa et al.) The scores were assessed against 72 Australian men using the English-language version as well as scores from previous female Australian participants. There was a significant difference between the Japanese and Australian groups (p,0.05). The BAQ was deemed adequate for use in both Japanese males and females.

== See also ==
- Body Attitudes Test
- Bulimia Test-Revised
- Eating Attitudes Test
- Eating Disorder Inventory
- SCOFF questionnaire
