= 12th Shorty Awards =

Awards show for short-form social web media content

- Awarded for: Honoring the best of social media
- Date: May 3, 2020
- Location: Online only
- Hosted by: J. B. Smoove

Television/radio coverage
- Network: Periscope; YouTube

The 12th Shorty Awards were held on May 3, 2020 via an online live stream event. The event was originally scheduled to be held at 1515 Broadway Theater in New York City, however, due to the COVID-19 pandemic, the event was held virtually. The digital show was hosted by American actor and comedian J. B. Smoove, and Fetty Wap provided a musical performance. The show was streamed on Periscope and YouTube with presenters including Lindsey Vonn, Bobby Berk and Jaime Camil.

== Influencer finalists and winners ==
The full nominations were announced on January 21, 2020 before voting and academy rankings determined the finalists. The finalists were announced on March 10, 2020. Winners were announced at the ceremony on May 3, 2020.

Winners are listed first and in boldface.

=== Arts & Entertainment ===
**Best Actor**: **Rebel Wilson**; Angela Bassett; Brie Larson; Billy Porter; Hunter Schafer; Naomi Scott; Sophie Turner	**Best Celebrity**: **Zendaya**; Adam Sandler; Beyoncé; Demi Lovato; Jennifer Aniston; Jonathan Van Ness
**Best in Comedy**: **Trevor Noah**; Aidy Bryant; Lamorne Morris; Randall Park; Trevor Wallace; Wanda Sykes	**Best in Dance**: **Benny the Bull**; Ghetto Spiderman; Harper Watters; Izzy and Easton; Kings United; Sherrie Silver
**Best in Music**: **Twice**; Billie Eilish; Celine Dion; Lil Nas X; Lizzo; Missy Elliott	**Best in Sports**: **Megan Rapinoe**; Alex Rodriguez; Allyson Felix; Coco Gauff; Simone Manuel; Zion Williamson

=== Content of the Year ===
**Emoji of the Year**: **Boooooring**; Australian Flag; Just a little bit; Sloth; Otter chillin'; Assisted Walking	**GIF of the Year**: **And I Oop**; Dog Yes; Idris Elba on Hot Ones; Lady Gaga Eye Roll; Marsai Martin at the BET Awards; Tesla's Bulletproof Window
**Instagram of the Year**: **Lizzo post AMAs**; John Mayer's bottle cap kick; Now we're Friends on Instagram too!; Ramen can fix anything; Will Smith getting to 50M followers; World Record Egg Post	**Meme of the Year**: **Woman Yells at Cat**; Grogu Sipping Tea; Gonna tell my kids...; Gummy Adele; Mr. Sandman Challenge; OK Boomer

=== Creative & Media ===
**Best Animal**: MAYA THE SAMOYED; Puddin; Reagandoodle; Tito the Raccoon; Venus the Two Face Cat; Waffles the Cat	**Best in Art**: **Dave Pollot**; Adam Hillman; Mike Bennett Art; Pablo Rochat; Positively Present; strawberrypuffcake
**Best in Beauty**: **Nikita Dragun**; Ariel Tejada; Cohl's World; Jessica Vu; Kheris Rogers; Letícia F Gomes	**Best in Fashion**: **Aquaria**; Adut Akech; Carmen Carrera; Edgar Artis; Menswear Dog; Tabria Majors
**Best in Food**: **Juns Kitchen**; Amirah Kassem; Erik Lamkin; Naturally.Jo; Sam the Cooking Guy; Y.Na	**Best in Health & Wellness**: **Wheels2Walking**; Chloe Ting; Diary of a Fit Mommy; Massy Arias; Megan Jayne Crabbe; The Sad Ghost Club
**Best in House & Home**: **Our Faux Farmhouse**; Bobby Berk; Farah Merhi; Joanna Gaines; Ryan Serhant; Studio McGee	**Best Journalist**: **Mona Chalabi**; Caitlin Dickerson; Hannah Morales; Mina Kimes; Stephen A. Smith; Yamiche Alcindor
**Best LGBTQ+ Account**: **Rose and Rosie**; Dom and Nick; Edison Fan; Jammidodger; Rain Dove; Ty Turner	**Best in Lifestyle**: **Les Do Makeup**; Chachi Gonzales; Cherry Wallis; Color Me Courtney; Jose Zuniga; Raven Navera
**Best in Meme/Parody Account**: **Thoughts of Dog**; Comments By Celebs; DILFs of Disneyland; PigeonsDoingThings; sonny5ideup; Subway Creatures	**Best in Parenting/Family**: **The Bramfam**; Team 2 Moms; The Bucket List Family; The McClure Family; The Rush Fam; Through Our Eyes
**Best in Weird**: **Jack Stauber**; Buttered Side Down; Caitlin Doughty; Jan Erichsen; Pro Bird Rights; The Nekci Menij Show

=== Team Internet ===
**Breakout YouTuber**: **Supercar Blondie**; Jennelle Eliana; Jordyn Woods; Niko Omilana; Noah Schnapp; Talia Mar	**Instagrammer of the Year**: **Wolfgang**; Adam Waheed; Laetitia Ky; Poorly Drawn Lines; Strange Planet; World Record Egg
**TikToker of the Year**: **Avani Gregg**; Brittany Broski; Emmy; Howie Mandel; Just Sul; theewilliam45	**Twitch Streamer of the Year**: **MrFreshAsian**; AnneMunition; dakotaz; LilyPichu; Loeya; Maria Lopez
**Best YouTube Comedian**: **Morgan Adams**; CalebCity; Eddy Burback; Kiera Bridget; Sarah Schauer; Scott Cramer; Emily Fan	**Best YouTube Ensemble**: **Kian and JC**; Dope or Nope; Montoya Twinz; Sam and Colby; Squirmy and Grubs; YouTwoTV
**Best YouTube Musician**: **Pomplamoose**; BlackGryph0n; Catie Turner; LLusion; Sam Tsui; SethEverman	**YouTuber of the Year**: **MrBeast**; ContraPoints; Eugenia Cooney; Jeffree Star; Vereena Sayed; Wengie

=== Tech & Innovation ===
**Best in Activism**: **Greta Thunberg**; Amanda Nguyen; Bindi & Robert Irwin; Oluwaseun Ayodeji Osowobi; Paul Nicklen and Cristina Mittermeier; Shaymaa Ismaa'eel	**Best in Gaming**: **NoisyButters**; Azzyland; bugha; Gloom; LazarBeam; VanossGaming
**Best Podcaster**: **Emma Chamberlain**; Conan O'Brien; Gabe Dunn; Jack Wagner and Brandon Wardell; Jenna Fischer and Angela Kinsey; MKBHD; Nikole Hannah-Jones	**Best in Travel**: **Haley Dasovich**; Carrie DeJong; Eva Zu Beck; Fearless & Far; Maryjane; VagaBrothers

=== Phenom Award ===
The Phenom Award is given to those that used social media to make a significant impact benefiting the community. The following received the 2020 Phenom Award:

- Jameela Jamil
- P. K. Subban
- Eugene Lee Yang
