= Burback =

Burback is a surname. It is an Americanized form of the German surname Burbach. Notable people with the surname include:

- Eddy Burback (born 1996), American comedian
