= Eugenia Cooney =

American internet personality (born 1994)

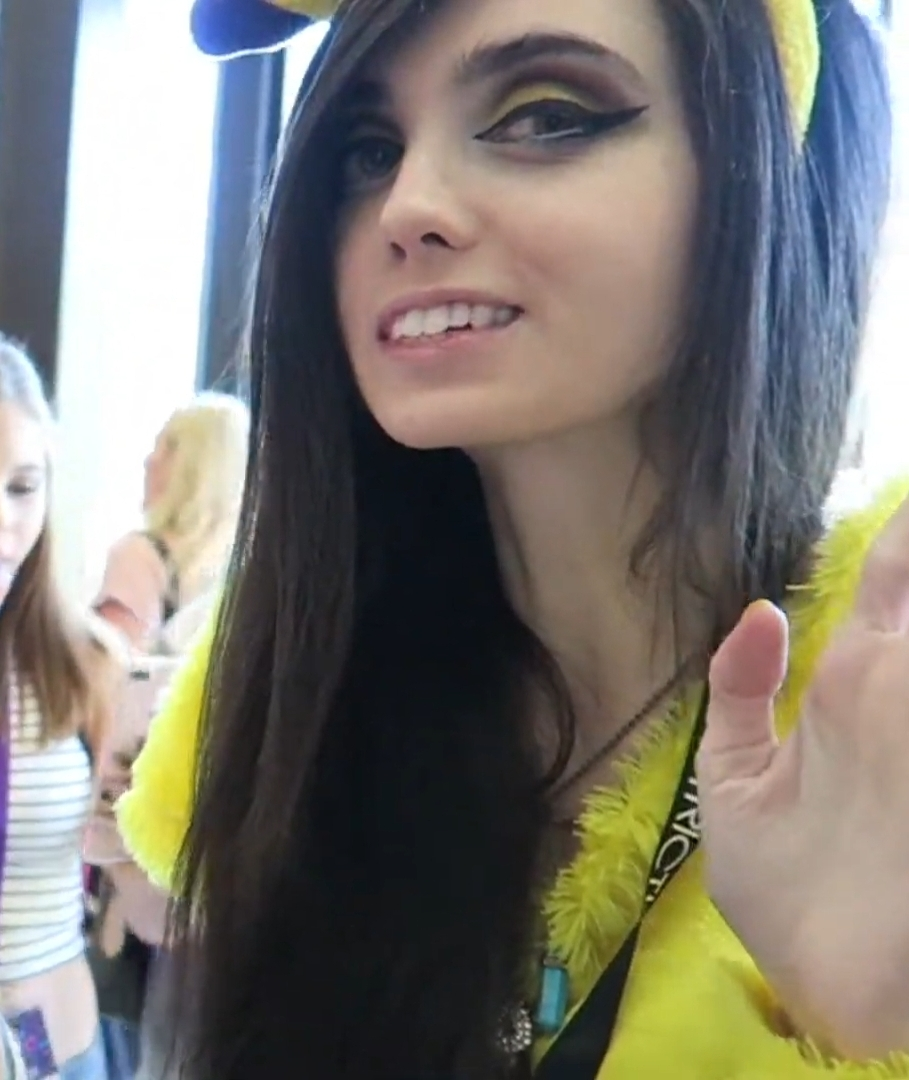
- Cooney in 2017
- Born: Colleen Cooney; July 27, 1994 (age 32); Boston, Massachusetts, U.S.
- Education: Connections Academy
- Occupations: YouTuber; Twitch streamer; social media influencer
- Years active: 2011–present

Twitch information
- Channel: eugeniacooney
- Followers: 467 thousand

YouTube information
- Channel: Eugenia Cooney
- Subscribers: 2.13 million
- Views: 275 million
- Last updated: August 2, 2025

Eugenia Sullivan Cooney (born Colleen Cooney; July 27, 1994) is an American YouTuber, Twitch streamer and Internet personality. She began livestreaming on broadcasting service YouNow and created a YouTube channel in 2011, which has more than 2 million subscribers. Cooney's content mainly involves clothing hauls, beauty, emo and gothic looks, cosplay, and vlogs of her daily life.

== Early life ==
Cooney was born Colleen Cooney on July 27, 1994, in Boston, Massachusetts. Her first name was changed to Eugenia several months after her birth. During her childhood, Cooney had few friends and was often the victim of bullying at school, which caused her to switch schools multiple times and begin attending an online school after her first year of high school. She transferred to Connections Academy and graduated in 2012. Cooney briefly pursued modeling in New York. After being asked to remove her online presence and feeling overcontrolled, Cooney decided to focus on her online career.

== Career ==
Cooney began her online presence on June 17, 2011, by livestreaming on broadcasting service YouNow, creating her YouTube channel later that year. Her first three videos amassed over 7.5 million views. Cooney's YouTube content mainly consists of clothing hauls, vlogs about her daily life, cosplay outfits, and makeup tutorials. She began livestreaming on Twitch in 2018, where she had over 400,000 followers as of 2022. She is known for her emo style, characterized by her "extraordinarily long, dark hair, gothic lace dresses, and bold, multi-colored makeup looks."

On November 16, 2018, Cooney starred in the video for Niki DeMar's song "Anthem for the Judged". She was nominated and a finalist for "YouTuber of the Year" for the 12th annual Shorty Awards in 2020.

Cooney has faced criticism and allegations that her content encourages eating disorders among viewers, with critics raising concern about her influence on her young fans. Cooney is a popular figure in online pro-ana communities, where her videos and images are used as thinspiration, although she does not explicitly promote anorexia. In 2015, viewers began expressing concern about her weight loss. In 2016, a Change.org petition titled "Temporarily Ban Eugenia Cooney off of YouTube" went viral and received 18,000 signatures, although it was later removed for "violating community guidelines". In response to the petition, Cooney denied having a problem and said that she did not intend to be a bad influence.

In July 2019, Cooney appeared as the subject of an hour-long YouTube documentary video by Shane Dawson titled "The Return of Eugenia Cooney", in which she confirmed that she had an eating disorder and detailed her recovery process for the first time. She noted several friends had gotten her help at the time. The video was viewed over 27 million times in a month. The reaction to "The Return of Eugenia Cooney" was mixed, with some viewers and mental health experts raising concerns about the future of her treatment, as well as the possible impact on Dawson's mostly young, female audience.

After Dawson's documentary released, Cooney resumed posting videos. She was initially praised when she returned, with people commending her for being honest about her health. As a result, Cooney was nominated for YouTuber of the Year at the 2020 Shorty Awards. Despite being initially praised for opening up about her struggle with an eating disorder, Cooney was soon criticized again for appearing to relapse. In early 2021, another petition was started on Change.org to age-restrict, or entirely remove, Cooney's YouTube channel and social media accounts, claiming that she promotes eating disorders.

Cooney resides with her family in Greenwich, Connecticut, and had a residence in Los Angeles, California.

== Awards and nominations ==
Year	Award show	Category	Result	Ref.
2020	Shorty Awards	YouTuber of the Year	Nominated	

== See also ==
- List of people from Boston, Massachusetts
- List of YouTubers
