= List of people with bulimia nervosa =

This is a list of notable people who have had bulimia nervosa. Often simply known as bulimia, this is an eating disorder which is characterized by consuming a large amount of food in a short amount of time, followed by an attempt to rid oneself of the calories consumed, usually by self-induced vomiting, laxatives, diuretics or excessive exercise. Eating disorders are known to be more common in people whose occupations involve significant focus on appearance, like athletes or celebrities.

== Music ==
- Paula Abdul, American singer
- Lily Allen, British singer-songwriter
- Melanie C, Spice Girls singer
- Lady Gaga, American singer
- Geri Halliwell, Spice Girls singer
- Elton John, British musician
- Demi Lovato, American singer and actor
- Katharine McPhee, American singer
- Alanis Morissette, Canadian-American musician
- Tove Lo, Swedish musician
- Shelby Starner, American singer-songwriter
- Lynda Thomas, Mexican musician
- Amy Winehouse, British singer-songwriter (1983–2011)

== Crime ==
- Andrea Yates, American insanity acquittee
- Salvador Ramos (Perpetrator of the 2022 Uvalde school shooting); died on May 24, 2022.

== Other ==
- Russell Brand, British comedian
- Candace Cameron Bure, American actress and producer
- Lord Byron, British poet (1788-1824)
- David Coulthard, British Formula One racing driver
- Katie Couric, American television journalist
- Diana, Princess of Wales, British royal family, (1961–1997)
- Michelle Duggar, American reality television star from 19 Kids and Counting
- Jocelyn Golden, author
- Marya Hornbacher, American author
- John Prescott, British politician
- Richard Simmons, American fitness instructor and television personality (1948–2024)
- Shane Dawson, American YouTube personality
- Bryony Gordon, English journalist
- Freddie Flintoff, British cricketer
- Jane Fonda, American actress
- Jennette McCurdy, American writer and former actress
- Camila Mendes, American actress
- Zoe Kravitz, American actress
- Lily Collins, American actress
- Lindsay Lohan, American actress
- Richa Chadha, Indian actress
- David Von Erich, American professional wrestler (1958-1984)
- Jaiden Animations, American YouTube personality

== See also ==
- List of people with anorexia nervosa
