= Amateur Hour =

Amateur Hour may refer to:

- Amateur live performances of comedy, music or poetry at an open mic night
- Major Bowes Amateur Hour, 1934–1952, a radio talent show in the US
- The Original Amateur Hour, 1948–1970, a television talent show in the US
- Australia's Amateur Hour, 1940–1958, a radio and television talent show in Australia
- Amateur Hour (song), a 1974 song by the band Sparks.
- Amateur Hour (album), a 2014 comedy album by Bob Odenkirk and Brandon Wardell
- Amateur Hour, a 2022 song by the band Eels from their album Extreme Witchcraft
