= Gerald Russell =

British psychiatrist (1928–2018)

- Born: 12 January 1928
- Died: 26 July 2018 (aged 90); London, UK
- Education: University of Edinburgh
- Occupation: Psychiatrist
- Known for: Describing Bulimia nervosa, an eating disorder
- Title: Professor of Psychiatry, Dean of the Institute of Psychiatry
- Children: 3 sons

Gerald Francis Morris Russell (12 January 1928 – 26 July 2018) was a British psychiatrist. In 1979 he published one of the first descriptions of bulimia nervosa, and Russell's sign has been named after him.

== Early life and education ==
Russell's father was a diplomate who worked at the British Embassy in Belgium. Russell went to school in Brussels. At the onset of World War II the family moved to the UK. He then attended George Watson's College, Edinburgh, and qualified as a medical doctor with MBChB from the University of Edinburgh in 1950. In 1957 Russell gained a PhD in neurology from the University of Edinburgh. Russell was advised to complete training by temporarily working in psychiatry. While at London's Maudsley Hospital he met the psychiatrist Aubrey Lewis and "was completely won over by the way that Lewis thought about and practised psychiatry" and became a psychiatrist too.

== Career ==
From 1971 to 1979 Russell was a professor and consultant psychiatrist at the Royal Free Hospital, London. During this time he noticed patients who were overeating, followed by self-induced vomiting or using purgatives or both and a morbid fear of becoming fat, which did not fit the classic description of anorexia nervosa. He called it bulimia nervosa.

From 1979 to 1993 he was a professor at the Institute of Psychiatry at the Maudsley Hospital, London, where he set up an eating disorder unit, which has been named after him.

He used family therapy as a treatment for eating disorders and -in one of the earliest and most influential critical assessments of its efficacy- evaluated it in a controlled trial. From 1993 onward he worked at Priory Hosp Hayes Grove, Bromley, Kent.

== Personal life ==
Russell married Margaret née Taylor on 8 September 1950, and they had three sons, born 1951, 1956 and 1957. His hobbies included art galleries, photography, and music. He died of cancer in London, on 26 July 2018, aged 90 years.
