= Edison Fan =

Chinese New Zealand model and entrepreneur

- 樊野
- Born: Fan Hua (樊离花); November 1, 1982 (age 43); Nanjing, China
- Other names: Fan Ye (樊野), RMIUC
- Citizenship: New Zealand
- Occupations: Model; actor; entrepreneur; civil engineer
- Years active: 2011–present
- Height: 1.81 m (5 ft 11 1/2 in)
- Spouse: Josh Taylor (m. 2012; div. 2015)
- Children: Frederic Y. Fan

Edison Ye Fan (Note: Chinese: 樊野) (born Hua Fan; (Note: Chinese: 樊离花) November 1, 1982) is a Chinese New Zealand model, internet personality, and entrepreneur. He is one of China's biggest openly gay influencers, with more than 1 million followers on Weibo and more than 700,000 followers on Instagram.

== Early and personal life ==
Fan was born in Nanjing, China, and moved to New Zealand as a teenager. During his childhood, he enjoyed learning traditional Chinese painting and ballet; but his parents, both of whom are doctors, preferred that he studied science. He graduated from the University of Auckland with a degree in civil engineering.

After moving to New Zealand, watching Ellen DeGeneres' stand-ups gave him confidence about his sexual orientation; and he eventually came out to his family at the age of 22.

Fan married (Note: Since 2005, New Zealand's law has allowed homosexual couples to enter into partnerships through civil unions and hold a "commitment ceremony" similar to a wedding. Same-sex marriage in New Zealand was legalised in August 2013.) his British boyfriend Josh Taylor in October 2012. They had met in June 2011, and decided to get married after 6 months of knowing each other. They were featured on the cover of Element Magazine #6 - The Love Issue (Feb/Mar 2014). The couple got divorced in February 2015.

Fan has a mixed-race son, who was born via surrogacy in November 2017. In June 2024, Edison got engaged to Korean model Huyve Seo (also known as Rob Seo) in Paris.

== Career ==
While in university, Fan signed part-time to a local modeling agency after being inspired by the show America's Next Top Model. After graduating, he worked as a civil engineer for many years.

In 2012, he began to achieve Internet fame on Chinese social media after posting selfies and vlogs. In October 2014, he was contacted to be one of the fashion judges on I Supermodel, and he got to be a guest judge for six episodes. After this opportunity, he moved to China in March 2015, as that is where most of his fanbase was. In the same year he appeared in the debate variety show, U Can U Bibi (Qi Pa Shuo). In the episode discussing whether gay men and lesbians should come out to their parents, he shared his coming out story. His popularity from the show led to gigs in Chinese dramas and movies in the following years.

As a model, he did a photo shoot for Charlie by Matthew Zink in January 2015, and was featured in the August 2015 issue of Male Model Scene magazine. He was also featured on Style by SCMP in July 2020. He has modeled for Tom Ford, Diesel, Calvin Klein, and Schwarzkopf.

Edison Fan on the cover of YELLOW by Zoen Lam (2019)

In 2016, Fan was approached by a Chinese company to design menswear, but citing too much competition he convinced them to do sportswear, and subsequently OMG (On My Game) Sportswear was launched. After a conversation with an agent who told Fan to stop posting "sexy pictures" because luxury brands won't sponsor him and he'd end up only selling Speedos and underwear, he got the idea of founding U-Touch Underwear, which was launched in July 2019 targeting gay men. An unpublished coffee table book "celebrating the beauty of Asian men" by photographer Zoen Lam, titled "YELLOW" to reclaim the term, featured 50 topless Asian men wearing U-Touch underwear, with Fan on the cover.

== Public image ==
Fan used the moniker "RMIUC", short for "rape me if you can", drawing inspiration from the movie Catch Me If You Can. He clarified that it refers to the stand taken by unfearing minds against rape, but his fans tended to read this in a more sexually suggestive way. RMIUC, called R da ("Master R") by his fans, had a channel named Master R's Channel on Tudou; and it had a video series called The Josh & Eddie Show with his then boyfriend Josh Taylor. The most well-known video in the series was The Josh & Eddie Show—Ep13—20 Days to Go, which quickly went viral after it was posted days before their wedding in October 2012.

Oscar Tianyang Zhou's paper "Chinese Top, British Bottom": Becoming a Gay Male Internet Celebrity in China (2019) discusses how the interracial relationship of RMIUC and J.T. was discursively constructed as "Chinese top, British bottom" among the Chinese BL fandom— as opposed to the stereotypical pattern of dominant White top vs submissive Chinese bottom— which transformed RMIUC into a masculinist and nationalistic gay icon.

As one of China's few openly gay public figures, Fan has been criticised by his Chinese fans for not speaking out about the LGBTQ+ community enough. He was also met with backlash when he voiced his support for BLM in 2020; some criticised him for only doing the bare minimum, while others attacked him for not speaking out on other issues. According to him, he does feel compelled to speak up on important things, but sometimes he just doesn't have "anything inspirational to say."

Fan, who was a finalist in the LGBTQ+ Account category at the 12th Annual Shorty Awards, had said in an interview, "We all have our ways of supporting the community, and I do it through showcasing my life candidly."

== Bibliography ==
- To Be Continued (2012), Fan's autobiography
- Love/The Play (2013), a romance novel
