= An ASMR Album =

Studio album by Brandon Wardell
- Released: June 1, 2018
- Genres: ASMR; comedy; acid jazz
- Length: 24:45
- Label: Nice Life
- Producer: Ricky Reed

Brandon Wardell chronology
Amateur Hour (2014)	An ASMR Album (2018)

An ASMR Album is the debut studio album by American comedian, Brandon Wardell. The album was released on June 1, 2018.

== Background ==
The album was first announced on May 3, 2018, while the entire concept of the album originally was revealed to be an entire joke. Producer Ricky Reed said that he and Wardell started the process as a "dumb idea" which manifested into the album. Reed said, of the album, and its recording process that it turned "into a gonzo journey through his brain complete with a time traveling plot twist and interludes played by a tiny band that sounds like ants playing jazz on acid".

In an interview with Paste, Wardell was interested in doing an autonomous sensory meridian response (ASMR) album, strictly because of the originality of it. Wardell said that to his knowledge, no musician or comedian has ever done an ASMR album before, so he wanted to be the first. Wardell further said of making the album "it’s not a good idea, but no one’s done it before. It’s just me whispering my jokes mostly. Imagine me whispering and also I’m giving you a scalp massage while I say it."

== Track listing ==
All lyrics are written by Brandon Wardell.

No.	Title	Length
1.	"Ground Rules"	2:25
2.	"I'm Your Dad"	4:24
3.	"Dad Hair"	3:40
4.	"Make Some Noise"	1:46
5.	"Haircut"	0:59
6.	"The Legendary Tiny Band"	1:44
7.	"Sex Perverts"	2:55
8.	"Crowd Work"	3:11
9.	"Autonomous Sensory Meridian Response"	2:52
10.	"Art"	1:38
Total length:		24:45

== Critical reception ==
Professional ratings
Review scores
Source	Rating
Pitchfork	5.7/10

In a mixed review, Larry Fitzmaurice of Pitchfork gave the album a 5.7/10. Fitzmaurice described the album as an "uneven listen, even for the most logged-on".
