= List of people with anorexia nervosa =

This is a list of notable people who had anorexia nervosa. Often simply known as anorexia, this is an eating disorder which is characterized by an obsessive fear of gaining weight, weight loss, and distorted body image. People with anorexia usually restrict their caloric intake and limit types of food they eat. Some people are also known to exercise excessively, purge with laxatives or vomiting and/or binge eat. Eating disorders are known to be more common in people whose occupations involve significant focus on appearance, like athletes or celebrities.

== Dance and sport ==
- Molly Bartrip (English footballer)
- Christy Henrich (American gymnast); died in July 1994, aged 22
- Gelsey Kirkland (American ballet dancer)
- Yulia Lipnitskaya (Russian figure skater)
- Tina Nordlund (Swedish footballer)

== Music ==
- Estelle Bennett (American singer, formerly of The Ronettes); died in February 2009, aged 67
- Karen Carpenter (American singer, formerly of The Carpenters); died in February 1983, aged 32
- Melanie C (British singer, formerly of the Spice Girls)
- Nicole Dollanganger (Canadian singer)
- Richey Edwards (Welsh lyricist and rhythm guitarist of the Manic Street Preachers); disappeared in February 1995, aged 27
- Caleb Followill (American musician, Kings of Leon)
- Daniel Johns (Australian rock musician)
- Dolores O'Riordan (Irish singer/songwriter, The Cranberries); died in January 2018, aged 46
- Diana Ross (American singer)
- Monica Sintra (Portuguese singer)
- Jade Thirlwall (British singer from the girl band Little Mix)
- Florence Welch (British singer, Florence and the Machine)

== Literature ==
- Jennifer Egan (American novelist)
- Louise Glück (American poet); died in October 2023, aged 80
- Michael Krasnow (American author); died in October 1997, aged 28, author of My Life as a Male Anorexic
- Marya Hornbacher (American author), author of Wasted: A Memoir of Anorexia and Bulimia

== Media ==
- Isabelle Caro (French model); died in November 2010, aged 28
- Lily Collins (American Actress)
- Lily-Rose Depp (French-American actress)
- Sarah Jane Dias (Indian actress)
- Elisa Donovan (American actress)
- Nikki DuBose (American model and actress)
- Susan Dey (American actress)
- Jaiden Dittfach (Jaiden Animations) (American YouTuber)
- Christopher Eccleston (British actor)
- Jenny Eclair (British comedian)
- Sally Field (American actress)
- Calista Flockhart (American actress)
- Jane Fonda (American actress)
- Tracey Gold (American actress)
- Nikki Grahame (British television personality); died in April 2021, aged 38
- Lucy Hale (American actress of the show Pretty Little Liars)
- Felicity Huffman (American actress)
- Angelina Jolie (American actress)
- Stacy London (Fashion stylist from What Not to Wear)
- Evanna Lynch (Irish actress from the Harry Potter movies)
- Jennette McCurdy (American writer and former actress)
- Paula Meronek (American reality TV personality)
- Barbara Niven (American actress)
- Mary-Kate Olsen (American actress)
- Billie Piper (British actress, singer)
- Dennis Quaid (American actor)
- Gilda Radner (American actress)
- Crystal Renn (American model)
- Christina Ricci (American actress)
- Portia de Rossi (Australian actress)
- Richard Simmons (American fitness guru, actor, and comedian); died in July 2024, aged 76
- Brittany Snow (American actress)

== Crime ==
- Adam Lanza (Perpetrator of the 2012 Sandy Hook Elementary school shooting); died on December 2012, aged 20
- Salvador Ramos (Perpetrator of the 2022 Uvalde school shooting); died on May 24, 2022.

== Other public figures ==
- Allegra Versace (heiress to the Versace fashion brand, daughter of Donatella Versace)
- Victoria, Crown Princess of Sweden (heiress to the Swedish royal throne)
- Shelli Yoder (American politician)
- Empress Elisabeth of Austria (Empress of Austria and Queen of Hungary)

== See also ==
- List of people with bulimia nervosa
- List of deaths from anorexia nervosa
