= Chloe Ting =

Australian YouTuber and fitness personality

- Born: 9 April 1986 (age 40); Brunei
- Occupations: YouTuber; personal trainer

YouTube information
- Channel: Chloe Ting
- Years active: 2011–present
- Genre: Fitness
- Subscribers: 26 million
- Views: 3.48 billion
- Last updated: Apr 2026
- Website: www.chloeting.com

Chloe Ting (born 9 April 1986) is an Australian fitness YouTuber. She is known as the most subscribed fitness content creator on YouTube, and for her workout programs, particularly her "Two Week Shred Challenge" which went viral on TikTok and YouTube during the COVID-19 pandemic in 2020.

== Early life and education ==
Ting was born in Brunei and moved to Melbourne, Australia at age 16. She has a Bachelor of Commerce from Monash University and later obtained a Master of Philosophy from the same institution. Ting is also a NASM Certified Personal Trainer.

== Career ==
Prior to starting a YouTube channel, Ting worked as an actuarial analyst. She has published a thesis on financial markets and was a Presenter & Chairperson at the Australasian Finance & Banking Conference.

=== YouTube ===
Ting began her self-titled YouTube channel in 2011 while she was still working in statistics. She started posting videos from March 2016, when she was 30 years old. Originally, her content discussed fashion and travel, but by 2017, her channel became entirely focused on fitness. Her August 2019 video, "Get Abs in Two Weeks", went viral after other bloggers and vloggers tried the workouts depicted therein. As of September 2023, that video has 517 million views.

During summer 2020 when many were in quarantine due to COVID-19, Ting's "Two Week Shred Challenge" rose to popularity on the video-sharing application TikTok. In December 2020, YouTube released their official report for top trending videos and creators in 2020, with Ting appearing in charts worldwide across the US, UK, and Asia. Digital Journal determined that Ting was the most-influential at home workout content creator.

As of February 2024, Ting's YouTube channel has over 25 million subscribers.

=== Defamation lawsuit ===
In 2021, Ting filed a defamation lawsuit against an individual and a company who made defamatory comments and content about her and her channel. In August 2023, Ting published a video titled "Finally talking about it." where she revealed that the legal proceedings concluded in her favour and that she had received settlement sum payouts from both parties.

== Personal life ==
Ting is known to suffer from small intestinal bacterial overgrowth. Ting's video production partner and boyfriend was Adrian. Chloe and Adrian broke up around April 2020.

In 2021, Ting left Melbourne and moved to Singapore. In 2023, Ting left Singapore for New York.

== Awards ==
In 2020, Ting won a Streamy Award at the 2020 Streamy Awards for the Health and Wellness category. Ting was also a finalist in the Health & Wellness (Creative & Media) category at the 2020 Shorty Awards and a finalist in the category Best Online Entertainment at the 2020 AACTA Awards.

In 2021, Ting was nominated in the Health and Wellness category at the 2021 Streamy Awards.
