= Russell's sign =

Medical sign

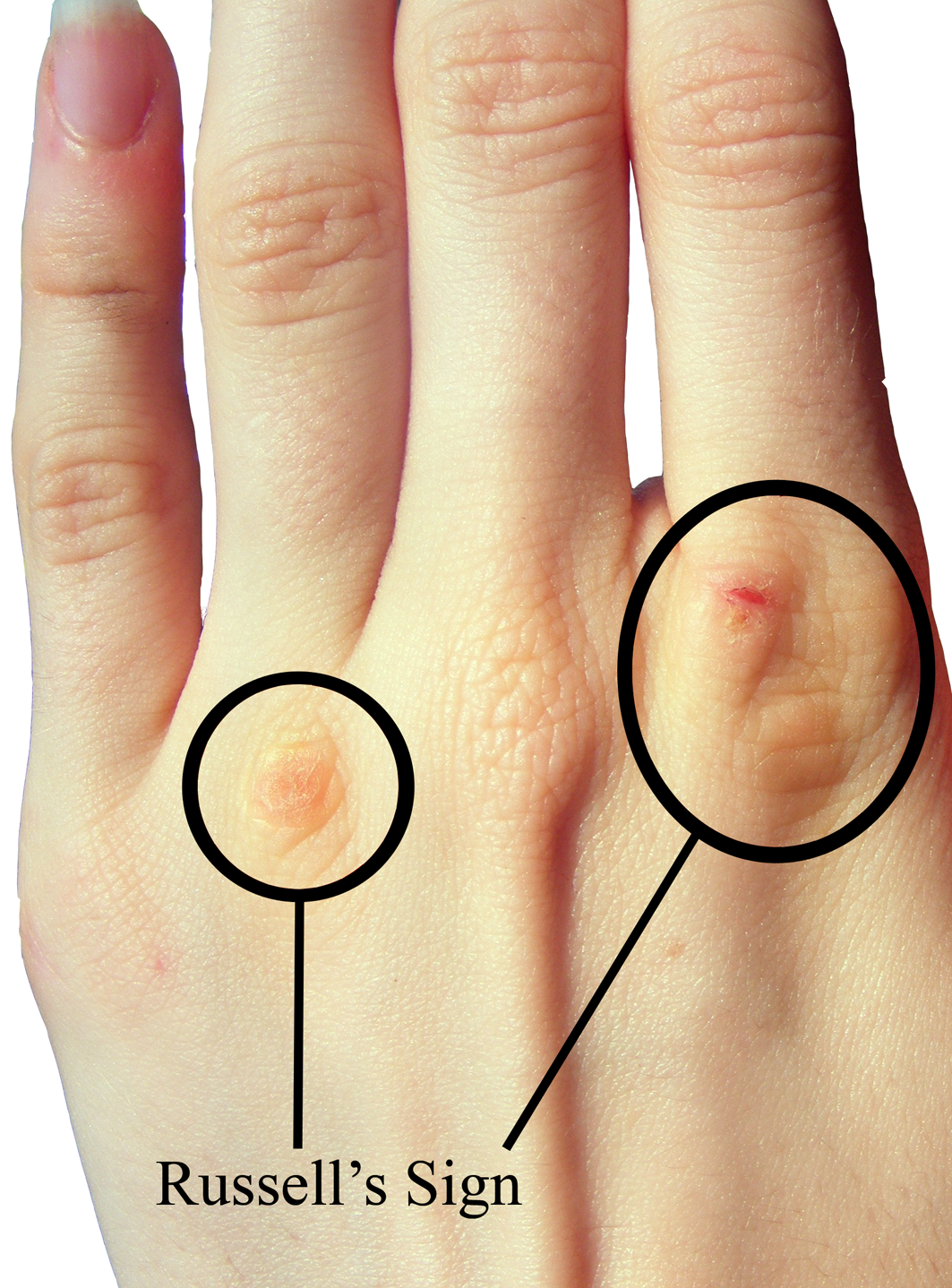
- Specialty: Psychiatry, clinical psychology
- Causes: The most common causes of Russell’s sign are bulimia, purging disorder, and anorexia nervosa.
- Differential diagnosis: Indirect sign of bulimia nervosa, purging disorder, or anorexia nervosa

Russell's sign, named after British psychiatrist Gerald Russell, is a sign defined as calluses on the knuckles or back of the hand due to repeated self-induced vomiting over long periods of time. The condition generally arises from the patient's knuckles making contact with the incisor teeth during the act of inducing the gag reflex at the back of the throat with their fingers.

This type of scarring is considered one of the physical indicators of a mental illness, and Russell's sign is primarily found in patients with an eating disorder such as bulimia nervosa, purging disorder, or anorexia nervosa. It is almost always associated with eating disorders and is the most characteristic skin condition indicative of purging.

People who are capable of "handsfree purging", or the induction of vomiting by the willful opening of the esophageal sphincter in a manner similar to belching, while contracting the stomach muscles, do not have Russell's sign. People who use a fork, spoon, or foreign object to stimulate the gag reflex may not display Russell's sign.
