= Yeah, But Still =

American comedy podcast

Yeah, But still
- Genre: Comedy, Popular culture, Politics

Cast and voices
- Hosted by: Brandon Wardell; Jack Wagner

Music
- Opening theme: Make Me Wanna Die by White Reaper

Production
- Length: 60–80 minutes

Publication
- No. of episodes: 500 (as of March 2023)
- Original release: November 5, 2017 – March 1, 2023

Reception
- Ratings: 4.7 stars (495 ratings)(Spotify)
- Cited for: 12th Shorty Awards (nominated)

Related
- Website: www.yeahbutstillpod.com

Yeah, But Still was an American podcast hosted by Jack Wagner and Brandon Wardell. The podcast was typically recorded at Wagner's house in Los Angeles, although there have been a few recorded performances at other venues, notably at the Kennedy Center. Yeah, But Still has been covered in the press by Rolling Stone, Paper, and XFDR; Rolling Stone listed Yeah, But Still as part of their "Best New Comedy Podcasts of 2018" list. They praised the podcast for giving a glimpse into the lives of its hosts with an exclusive lens previously only accessible to Hollywood insiders. Paper focused on the comedic value inherent in the unstructured conversations between Wagner and Wardell. XFDR focused on the show's credibility as a source of insider knowledge in the field of popular internet meme culture.

Jack Wagner has practiced investigative journalism in some episodes. One such investigation was featured in the two-part series The Calamari Algorithm which was a probe regarding certain business practices of Dave & Buster's.

Yeah, But Still announced the show would end with Episode 500 via the show's official Twitter account. The final episode aired on March 4, 2023, concluding the podcast.

Jack Wagner, inspired by the Halloween specials, launched Otherworld in 2022, "...a podcast that shares true stories from people who have experienced something paranormal, supernatural, or unexplained.." The original YBS Halloween Special, along with exclusive interviews, episodes, and content, is available via the Otherworld Patreon.

Co-host Brandon Wardell and frequent guest and comedian, Jamel Johnson, launched The Brandon Jamel Show (BJS) podcast shortly after Yeah, But Still came to an end. Previously released premium episodes of the show are also available via their Patreon.
