= Dream Home Makeover =

- Genre: Reality television
- Country of origin: United States
- Original language: English
- No. of seasons: 4
- No. of episodes: 24

Production
- Running time: 22–29 minutes

Original release
- Network: Netflix
- Release: October 16, 2020 – December 9, 2022

Dream Home Makeover is a 2020 reality television series. The first season was released on Netflix on October 16, 2020, the second season on January 1, 2021, and the third season on July 27, 2022. The fourth and final season was released on December 9, 2022.

== Premise ==
Dream Home Makeover follows Shea and Syd McGee (of Studio McGee) as they help dreams come true for real families looking to update their home tailored to their own unique style. A typical episode has the couple working with a client on a renovation project in their home. The budget outlined by the clients range greatly, as some projects are just a single room while others are entire homes. Tying the episodic renovation storylines together, the show also acts as a documentary of the McGees; viewers get an intimate look into the McGees' personal life as they run Studio McGee, raise their three young daughters, and often make renovations on their own dream home.

According to "10 Fun Facts From Dream Home Makeover," the firm says: "our show was completely unscripted!"

== Episodes ==
Season	Episodes	Originally released
1	6	October 16, 2020
2	6	January 1, 2021
3	6	July 27, 2022
4	6	December 9, 2022

=== Season 1 (2020) ===
No. overall	No. in season	Title	Original release date
1	1	"Forever Home"	October 16, 2020
Let's get together. Aspiring to entertain year-round, a couple asks the McGees to bring both brightness and moodiness to a large, underutilized space.
2	2	"Manor House Designs"	October 16, 2020
Couple goals: Shea adds her impeccable touch to her neighbors' luxe, expansive new home. Meanwhile, Studio McGee celebrates its fifth anniversary.
3	3	"Movie Room Remake"	October 16, 2020
It's moving day for the McGees. Can Shea turn their new house into a real home? Later, a London transplant yearns for the home theater of his dreams.
4	4	"Los Angeles Hideaway"	October 16, 2020
After working remotely on a total remodel of an LA midcentury home, the McGees visit the spot for the first time to mix the clients' opposing styles.
5	5	"Historic Home Renovation"	October 16, 2020
Time to revive an old soul. Shea reimagines the loft of a converted barn from 1851 as a fresh family room. But historic homes can hold surprises.
6	6	"Renovating Kitchen"	October 16, 2020
Shea takes on a family dream home with a catch: a cramped kitchen. With the clock ticking, the transformation begins with improved flow and function.

=== Season 2 (2021) ===
No. overall	No. in season	Title	Original release date
7	1	"Luxury Estate"	January 1, 2021
Score! Shea shoots for a cozy, custom feel when it comes to one of her biggest projects: a home with a basketball court for an ex-NBA player's family.
8	2	"Midcentury Makeover"	January 1, 2021
Midcentury modern enthusiasts Omar and Josh hope to turn their guest house into a stylish studio for mom, inspiring Shea to revamp the entire space.
9	3	"Bath Hideaway"	January 1, 2021
Footloose in Lehi, Utah, Shea puts the funk into function and turns a nightmarish bathroom into a dreamy spa refuge for a couple with six kids.
10	4	"Restoring History"	January 1, 2021
Out with the linoleum, in with the charm. Shea updates the kitchen of a 1908 historic home while preserving the cheery character for a young family.
11	5	"Mountain Retreat Makeover"	January 1, 2021
A couple's cabin calls for both bohemian and modern vibes, so Shea lightens the fireplace and welcomes the outdoors in with glass and greenery.
12	6	"Bedroom Oasis"	January 1, 2021
Aloha is in the air as Syd celebrates his birthday and Shea sidesteps cheesiness and aims to please a client seeking a Hawaii-inspired bedroom.

=== Season 3 (2022) ===
No. overall	No. in season	Title	Original release date
13	1	"A Dream Kitchen Come True"	July 27, 2022
Shea and Syd McGee tackle a dated kitchen in an otherwise gorgeous home with ocean views, making a splash with open shelves, integrated appliances and a chic sink.
14	2	"Open Concept Space"	July 27, 2022
A client seeks a bedroom remodel, and, moved by the woman's charity work, Shea decides to give her the surprise of her life.
15	3	"The Dream in Dream Home"	July 27, 2022
Back on Syd's sunny home turf, the McGees help some of their earliest clients build a SoCal dream home complete with a wine room and a secret passage.
16	4	"Basement Transformation"	July 27, 2022
In Draper, Utah, a family of five looks to level up the basement, while Syd and Shea prepare for their new baby.
17	5	"Primary Suite Renovation"	July 27, 2022
First-time parents ask the McGees to transform their San Francisco "purple palace" into a multigenerational residence and work-from-home oasis.
18	6	"Living Room Brought to Life"	July 27, 2022
Shea draws inspiration from nature to create a formal yet kid-friendly living room for an outdoorsy family with a heartrending story.

=== Season 4 (2022) ===
No. overall	No. in season	Title	Original release date
19	1	"Kitchen Expansion"	December 9, 2022
Shea and Syd create a drool-worthy kitchen remodel for one of their own team members — complete with a custom range hood and butler's pantry.
20	2	"The Mother of all Remodels"	December 9, 2022
A mom and son hope to bring modernity to their home while keeping some granny-chic elements. But Shea finds a chicken motif that needs to fly the coop.
21	3	"Playroom Update"	December 9, 2022
A family wants their toy room to be sophisticated enough to double as a guest room. Shea finds a way to install playful touches, like a climbing wall.
22	4	"From Living Room to Library"	December 9, 2022
Shea ushers Little House on the Prairie charm back into an 1885 pioneer home that had lost its original character to renovations over the decades.
23	5	"Family Trailer Rebuild"	December 9, 2022
Syd has a surprise for Shea: he bought an Airstream! Out of her comfort zone, Shea imagines one tricked-out trailer — but is her vision even possible?
24	6	"Primary Bath Reconnected"	December 9, 2022
Sick of their "his-and-hers" bathrooms, a Salt Lake City couple asks Shea to knock down the wall between them... as well as add a splashy new feature.

== Release ==
Dream Home Makeover was released on October 16, 2020, on Netflix.
