= Element Magazine =

Asian men's online magazine

- Edison Fan and his then husband Josh Taylor on the cover of Element Magazine #6 - The Love Issue (Feb/Mar 2014)
- Editor-in-chief: Noel Ng
- Categories: Fashion, Lifestyle
- Frequency: Bi-Monthly
- Publisher: Hiro Mizuhara
- First issue: March 2013
- Company: Epic Media Pte Ltd.
- Country: Singapore
- Based in: Singapore
- Language: English
- Website: elementmag.asia

Element Magazine is an Asian men's online magazine that focuses on fashion and lifestyle. Its coverage includes art, grooming, music, entertainment, social issues and travel. It is published bi-monthly in Singapore by Epic Media.

== History ==
Element Magazine has been described as the first alternative high-fashion and lifestyle men's journal with featured stories connected to the Asian LGBTQI community in particular, and it is launched and based in Singapore. The magazine was established by Noel Ng and Hiro Mizuhara in March 2013. The decision to launch the magazine on digital platforms enabled the publishers to side-step Singapore's regulation of print media and meant it had no need to obtain a media license. It uses an Internet host server in the United States. Normative and positive depictions of gay people in mainstream media are currently banned in Singapore by the Media Development Authority (MDA). The magazine boasts an average digital circulation of more than 15,000 since its launch. It is also the organizer of Asia Pink Awards, a regional Awards event that celebrates those campaigning for LGBTQI acceptance in Asia

== Editorial ==
Element Magazine often promotes and features sexual health related contents and campaigns besides fashion and lifestyle. In 2013, it launched a visual campaign to promote HIV/AIDS awareness in World AIDS Day 2013.
