= Jan Hakon Erichsen =

Norwegian contemporary artist

- Born: June 23, 1978 (age 48)
- Education: Oslo Academy of Fine Arts
- Website: janhakon.com

Jan Hakon Erichsen (born June 23, 1978) is a Norwegian contemporary artist. He is known for his short "destruction videos", often featuring balloons being popped.

== Work ==
Erichsen has become well known for his "destruction videos", which he began making in late 2017. Now, he typically posts one video a day on Instagram. The videos most commonly depict elaborate methods of popping balloons, but other recurring themes include crushing dry pasta and taco shells, destroying household items, and wearing bizarre "hats" made from food. Items often used in the videos include balloons, dry pasta, bananas, cacti, and knives, of which Erichsen has said he owns "somewhere between 500 and 1000".

Erichsen's influences include Chris Burden, 1960s and 1970s performance art, punk rock, and horror films.

In 2019, a 2-minute compilation of Erichsen's balloon popping videos went viral on Twitter, accumulating 9.5 million views in 24 hours and hundreds of thousands of likes and reetweets. He was nominated for a Shorty Award in 2020, in the category of "Best in Weird".

== Personal life ==
Erichsen lives in Oslo with his girlfriend and two teenage children. While working out in April 2020, Erichsen fell on a "knife sculpture" he had built for a video, requiring 25 stitches and multiple trips to the hospital.
