= Jocelyn Golden =

American author and bulimia awareness activist

Jocelyn Golden wrote Learning To Be Me - My Twenty-Three-Year Battle with Bulimia (ISBN 1583484825) in October 2005. It has gained attention as being one of the most in-depth accounts of extreme bulimia. Her battle from the age of 13 involved two surgeries including losing her large intestine. Today she writes and speaks on the subject of bulimia and related issues.
