= Dakotaz =

American Twitch streamer and YouTuber

dakotaz
- Born: Brett Hoffman; July 13, 1986 (age 40); Dearborn, Michigan, U.S.

Twitch information
- Channel: dakotaz
- Years active: 2013–present
- Games: Fortnite: Battle Royale; Among Us; Valorant
- Followers: 4.7 million

YouTube information
- Channel: Dakotaz
- Years active: 2013–present
- Subscribers: 2.74 million
- Views: 295 million
- Last updated: May 7, 2024

Brett Hoffman (born July 13, 1986), better known as dakotaz, is an American Twitch streamer and YouTuber from Dearborn, Michigan who plays Fortnite: Battle Royale as well as other titles. While he has streamed other games in the past, including Fortnite almost exclusively, he now plays a variety including Valorant. He also uses the tag "Dark", or the abbreviated "DK".

== Career ==
Hoffman began streaming The War Z then called Infestation: Survivor Stories. He later moved on to H1Z1 and PlayerUnknown's Battlegrounds. Hoffman created his YouTube channel in January 2013.

Hoffman's channels grew exponentially after the release of Fortnite and credits his gameplay and personality for his growth in popularity. He joined Team SoloMid (TSM) in January 2018 and left the team one year later, he is currently signed with Loaded. He first showed his face in 2018 after hitting one million subscribers. By the end of 2018, he was the sixth most viewed channel on Twitch with 50 million views.

In 2020, Hoffman raised $21,000 for Australian Fire Relief. Later that year he renewed his sponsorship with Twitch. He said he would be showing his face more often than he did in the past.

As of 2026, Hoffman primarily livestreams and plays Fortnite. He is an active member of the Morning Lobby, an Among Us group.

== Personal life ==
He has a twin brother who also streams Fortnite under the alias Hofmvn. Hoffman currently lives in Orlando, Florida.
