= Studio McGee =

Interior design and home decor firm

Studio McGee Inc.
- Company type: Private
- Industry: Interior design; Product design; E-commerce
- Founded: 2014
- Headquarters: Salt Lake City, Utah
- Key people: Shea McGee (Chief Creative Officer); Syd McGee (CEO)
- Brands: Studio McGee; McGee & Co.
- Number of employees: 76 (2020)
- Website: https://studio-mcgee.com/

Studio McGee Inc. is an interior design and home decor company. Founded by couple Shea and Syd McGee in 2014, Studio McGee came to prominence through social media and developed a signature style that the company would later dub "New Heritage." Starting in 2020 with their Emmy-nominated Netflix show Dream Home Makeover, the company attracted an even wider audience, leading to ongoing partnerships with Target and Kohler, and publishing two New York Times bestselling books.

== History ==
Studio McGee co-founder, Shea McGee, was raised in Texas. She graduated from Brigham Young University with a degree in public relations. She met her husband, Syd, in Utah while he was attending Utah Valley University. The couple married and moved to Southern California, where Syd was originally from. Shea became interested in design and enrolled in classes at a community college in California.

After documenting the design and renovation of their first Los Angeles home on Instagram and attracting a following, the McGee's used the momentum to start an interior design firm called Studio McGee in 2014. They sold their home and reinvested the money to established the business in Salt Lake City, Utah, living in rental houses in the city over the next few years while the business grew.

In 2016, the company established the product design and e-commerce brand McGee & Co. That same year, they launched a YouTube channel to expand their content creation.

== Design style ==
Studio McGee is known for its self-described "New Heritage" style. Shea McGee has described her company's signature look as "all about mixing styles – juxtaposing modern and traditional, old and new, and layering lots of textures."

== Partnerships ==
In 2020, Studio McGee launched a line of home furnishings in partnership with Target. The company acquired an investment from investment firm Strand Equity Partners. In 2023, the studio partnered with Kohler to launch a collection of bathroom and kitchen furnishings. That year, Shea McGee also launched an interior design course on the Masterclass platform.

== Media ventures ==
The McGees were initially hesitant to break into the TV business. After an unsatisfying experience with a production company that wanted the couple to conform to "the quintessential husband-and-wife design construction duo," Studio McGee began talks with Netflix in 2018 to create a TV series. Filming lasted from August 2019 through July 2020. The reality series Dream Home Makeover premiered on Netflix on October 16, 2020 and lasted four seasons.

Shea and Syd McGee released a memoir and design book, Make Life Beautiful, on October 27, 2020. The book became a New York Times bestseller on November 15 of that year. In 2023, the Shea McGee released The Art of Home, her company's first coffee table design book, making the New York Times bestseller list on October 1.

== Awards and recognition ==
By 2020, Studio McGee had acquired 1.3 million followers on Instagram and 235,000 YouTube subscribers.

Studio McGee was nominated for a Shorty Award in 2020. Studio McGee's Netflix show, Dream Home Makeover, was nominated for Outstanding Instructional and How-To Program at the 49th Daytime Emmy Awards in 2021.
