= Eating recovery =

Rehabilitation from eating disorders

Eating recovery refers to the full spectrum of care that acknowledges and treats the multiple etiologies of anorexia nervosa and bulimia, including the biological, psychological, social and emotional causes of the disorder, through a comprehensive, integrated treatment regimen. When successful, this regimen restores the individual to a healthy weight and arms them with the skills and resources needed to maintain a sustainable recovery. Although there are a variety of treatment options available to the eating disorders patient, the intensive and multi-faceted program followed in eating recovery is the appropriate option for individuals who require intensive support and are able to commit to treatment in an inpatient, residential or full-day hospital setting.

Eating recovery has been associated with increased likelihood of a sustained post-treatment recovery. This carefully orchestrated treatment curriculum incorporates the following tenets to help patients cultivate an understanding of disease-management skills and how to implement those lessons into their post-treatment lives.

== Biological/medical treatment ==
Eating disorders are physically and emotionally destructive. Most individuals with an eating disorder require ongoing medical treatment throughout their recovery. According to the Eating Disorder Foundation, early diagnosis and intervention significantly enhance chances of recovery, while eating disorders that are not identified or treated in their early stages can become chronic, debilitating and life-threatening.

For most people with eating disorders, the medical complications associated with the disease can be successfully treated with a combination of ongoing medical care and monitoring, nutritional counseling and medication. The Eating Disorder Foundation recommends people with eating disorders seek a recovery option that involves clinicians from different health disciplines, such as nursing, nutrition and mental health, a treatment philosophy consistent with the tenets of eating recovery.

Medical issues associated with eating disorders. Extremely medically compromised patients who are at a very low weight will require a more intensive medical intervention. Anorexia patients with a very low body weight (BMI < 13) may need to be stabilized due to medical complications caused by starvation, including liver failure or heart problems. Bulimia patients may need to manage edema, hypokalemia or esophagitis.

Poor nutrition affects the brain’s chemicals and functionality. As a result, extremely low weight patients will have difficulty responding to cognitive therapy without first gaining weight. Medically supervised weight restoration is necessary before psychotherapy or many pharmaceuticals can affect the patient’s behavioral health.

Misdiagnosis of the medical complications of eating disorders is common due to the unique physiology of these patients. Eating disorders can slow a resting heart rate and lower a "normal" body temperature range. For this reason, patients should seek specialized care from a doctor experienced in treating eating disorders.

== Mindfulness ==
During the process of eating recovery, patients integrate mindfulness into every area of their treatment. Mindfulness is a mental state, characterized by concentrated awareness of one's thoughts, actions or motivations. Being "present" in every element of treatment, including meals, therapy sessions, classes or medical treatment helps patients become more receptive to different points of view. It also helps them become less reactive to emotions, instead focusing only on activities occurring in the present moment.

Mindfulness training focused on eating, body image and body awareness can lead the way to health, and recovery by enabling individuals to consciously experience and observe their internal mental and bodily events as well as those external events that are perceived directly through the senses. In eating recovery, mindfulness helps patients calm their minds and understand their self-defeating emotions or mood-dependent behaviors and instead cultivate healthy coping skills.

Mindfulness facilitates two key techniques—mentalizing and building self-awareness

Mentalization in eating recovery takes the concept of mindfulness one step further, often thought of as mindfulness of mind. Mentalization describes a person's ability to understand the mental state of themself and others based on overt behavior. Mentalization is a core challenge among people with eating disorders, and its lack can result in severe emotional fluctuations, impulsivity, and vulnerability to interpersonal and social interactions, particularly in the midst of emotional interaction.

In eating recovery, patients work with their therapists to mentalize, or identify, their own emotions while understanding that others may hold differing points of view. The ability to understand emotions and see situations from more than one viewpoint reduces anxiety and minimizes the need to rely on an eating disorder as a coping mechanism.

Self-awareness refers to an individual's ability to become aware of their own subconscious thinking. Absence of self-awareness is frequently seen in eating disorder patients, causing them to react to situations, feelings and other stimuli emotionally rather than rationally.

By practicing mindful self-awareness, eating recovery learn to examine their thoughts, feelings, memories and bodily sensations from an objective point of view. Patients are encouraged to let go of self-centered thinking to achieve a state wherein individuals are able to observe their thoughts and understand their subconscious motivations—sexual, material, emotional, intellectual, and spiritual. This comprehension builds calmness and patience, minimizing the need to rely on an eating disorder as a coping mechanism.

== Motivation ==
Motivation is the set of reasons that determines why and how individuals engage in particular behaviors. In eating recovery, the goal is to shift patients from emotion-motivated behavior to values-motivated behavior through self-directedness and the construction of values awareness. Patients learn to identify their own core values and direct themselves in behaviors that align with their value systems, while limiting behaviors that do not.

Driving self-directedness. Self-directedness is a dimension of a person's character which has to do with the ability of an individual to control, regulate, and adapt their behavior to the situation at hand in accordance with their own goals, purposes, and values. An individual's inability to curtail eating disorder behaviors stems from low self-directedness. Eating recovery focuses on helping patients engage in self-directed behavior by giving their actions meaning within a values context.

Building values awareness. Self-directedness is difficult, if not impossible, without awareness of core values. Values provide the context for actions and feelings. Without awareness of values, people are often swayed by their emotional responses which may or may not serve their long-range goals and purposes. Under the sway of emotions, eating disorder behavior may become impulsive, "automatic", and mindless.

In eating recovery, clinicians and therapists assist patients in identifying their core values. This approach allows patients to see the "big picture" and engage in behaviors that align with their core values while avoiding behaviors of a conflicting nature.

== Mood management ==
Chronic anxiety is a key trait of individuals with eating disorders, their lives consumed with coping with the emotions that result from anxiety. These emotion-driven moods often elicit negative coping behaviors and narrow the patient's awareness of coping options. These impulsive behaviors can drive mindless, rigid, stereotyped responses such those seen with eating disorders.

In eating recovery, cognitive behavioral therapy and dialectical behavioral therapy are employed to interrupt negative cycles of behavior and replace them with positive, purposeful coping mechanisms.

Cognitive behavioral therapy' or CBT is a psychotherapeutic approach utilized in eating recovery that aims to influence dysfunctional emotions, behaviors and cognitions through a goal-oriented, systematic procedure. Cognitive-behavioral therapy is used to treat the mental and emotional elements of an eating disorder, helping patients change their attitudes about food, eating, and body image, correct poor eating habits, and prevent relapse.

Dialectical behavioral therapy or DBT combines standard cognitive-behavioral techniques for emotion regulation and reality-testing with concepts of mindful awareness, distress tolerance, and acceptance in the treatment of eating disorders. Influenced by Buddhist meditative practice, DBT includes the following key elements: behaviorist theory, dialectics, cognitive therapy, and, DBT's central component, mindfulness.

== Seeking recovery ==
According to the Eating Disorder Foundation, eating disorders are serious and complex illnesses that require the attention of trained professionals. Although those with the disease may have the desire, it is almost impossible for "self treatment" to be effective; in fact, trying to go it alone will likely result in repeated failures. Early detection and intervention has been proven to increase the chance of full recovery. It is essential for the person with the illness to get a professional assessment first, from a practitioner trained in eating recovery.
