= Brandon Wardell (comedian) =

American comedian (born 1992)

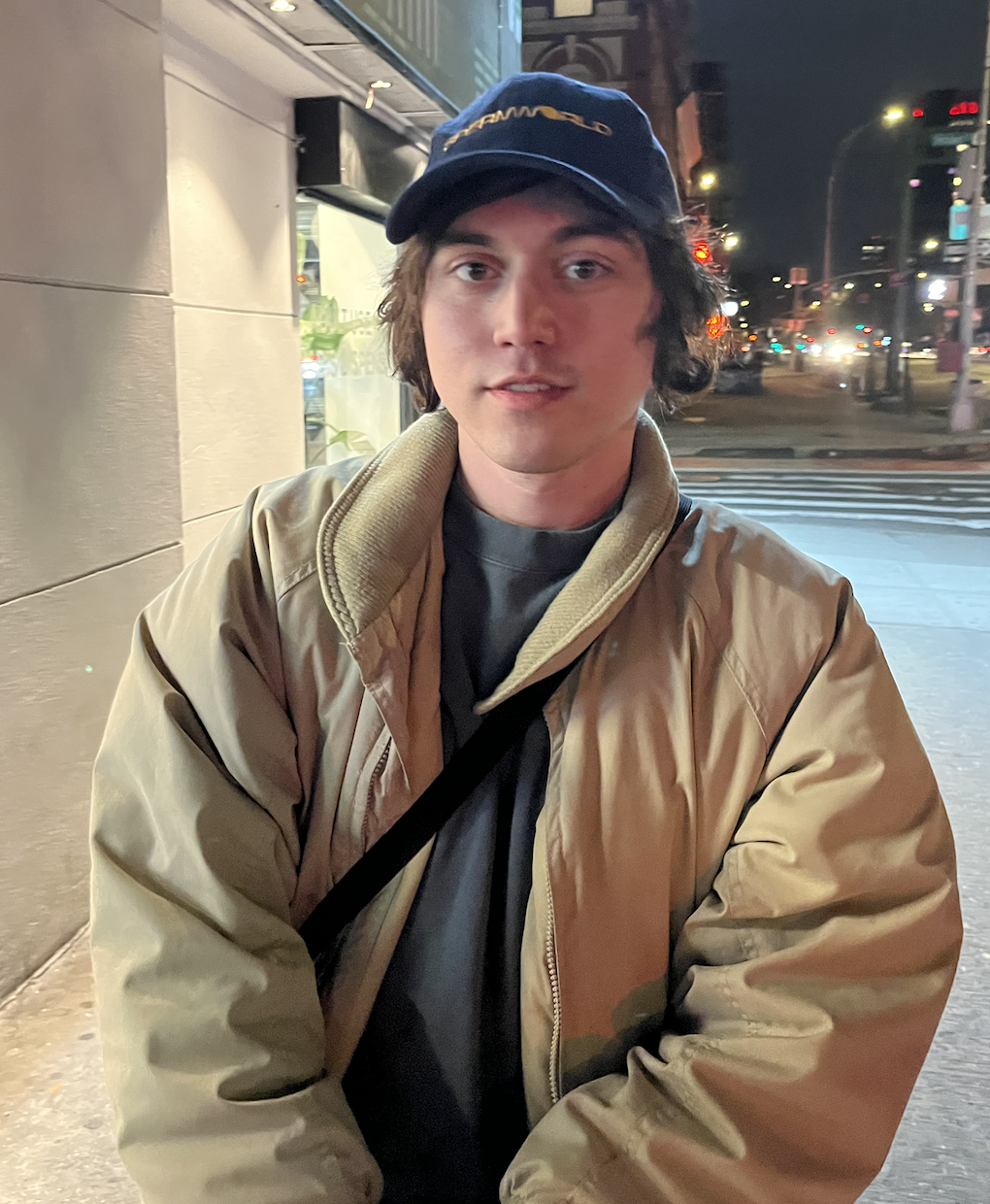
- Wardell in 2024
- Born: Brandon Scott Wardell; September 5, 1992 (age 34); Seattle, Washington, U.S.

Comedy career
- Years active: 2010–present
- Medium: Stand up; television; music
- Genres: Alternative comedy; observational comedy
- Subjects: Adolescence; narcissism; current events; internet culture
- Website: brandonwardell.net

Brandon Scott Wardell (born September 5, 1992) is an American comedian and writer.

== Early life ==
Brandon Wardell was born in the Seattle area before moving to Northern Virginia when he was a child. His mother was born in Manila, Philippines, to a Spanish father and Filipino mother. He grew up in Fairfax, Virginia and attended Robinson Secondary School. Wardell was a frequent contributor on the ToonZone forum in his youth. After attending Robinson, Wardell briefly attended Virginia Commonwealth University in Richmond, Virginia, but ultimately dropped out to pursue a career in comedy. Wardell has type 1 diabetes.

== Career ==
Wardell's career began at the age of 17 in early 2010 doing open mics before being invited to comedy hours in the Washington, D.C. region. Garnering local success, Wardell was scouted to perform at SXSW in Austin, Texas and the Bridgetown Comedy Festival in Portland, Oregon in the Spring 2012, eventually leading him to be featured in The Washington Post in October 2012.

In mid-2013, an agent in Los Angeles noticed Wardell through the Washington Post article, and scouted Wardell to be part of his organization. After spending two weeks at VCU, Wardell accepted the terms, dropped out of VCU, and moved to Los Angeles to further pursue comedy.

After Wardell appeared on several podcasts, his work was noticed by Bob Odenkirk, who featured Wardell on his late 2014 live comedy album, Amateur Hour, in which Wardell is featured on the opening four tracks.

While the album was well received, Wardell's performance received negative reviews, with many fans and critics questioning Wardell's presence on the album. One critic panned his performance, saying that Wardell starts the album off with a "thud" and "unmemorable bits". A writer for The A.V. Club found it "strange" that Wardell was included on the album.

In 2015, he toured with Bo Burnham. He then became the host of Comedy Central's Snapchat series "Hot Takes." On January 27, 2016, he made his TV debut appearing on the Comedy Central show @midnight.

In addition to stand-up, Wardell has written articles for Vice, The Washington Post, and Four Pins. In November 2017, Wardell began recording a podcast entitled Yeah, But Still with co-host Jack Wagner.

In 2016, Wardell received internet fame for popularizing the "dicks out for Harambe" meme. In 2021, Wardell reportedly signed with the Creative Artists Agency (CAA).

He has also canvassed for the Democratic Socialists of America.

== Performance credits ==
=== Discography ===
- An ASMR Album (2018)

==== Featured ====
- Amateur Hour with Bob Odenkirk (2014)

=== Filmography ===
- Boys I Used to Babysit (2015)
- Filthy Preppy Teen$ (2015)
- What Would Diplo Do? (2017)
- Do You Want to See a Dead Body? (2017)
- Like and Subscribe (2018)
- Twelve Forever (2019)
- I Think You Should Leave with Tim Robinson (2019-2023)
- Easter Sunday (2022)
- Drugstore June (2024)
- Universal Basic Guys (2024-)
- Wonder Man (2026)
