= Instagram egg =

Picture of an egg posted on Instagram

The egg photo posted to Instagram

The Instagram egg is a photo of an egg posted by the account @world_record_egg on the social media platform Instagram. It became a global phenomenon and an internet meme within days of its publication on 4 January 2019. It is the second most-liked Instagram post and was the most-liked Instagram post from 14 January 2019 until 20 December 2022, when it was overtaken by Lionel Messi's post showing him and his teammates celebrating after Argentina won the 2022 FIFA World Cup. The owner of the account was revealed to be Chris Godfrey, a British advertising creative, who later worked with his two friends Alissa Khan-Whelan and CJ Brown on a Hulu commercial featuring the egg, intended to raise mental health awareness.

== Background ==
The photo was originally taken by Serghei Platanov, who then posted it to Shutterstock on 23 June 2015 with the title "eggs isolated on white background".

== History ==
On 4 January 2019, the @world_record_egg account was created, and posted an image of a bird egg with the caption, "Let's set a world record together and get the most liked post on Instagram. Beating the current world record held by Kylie Jenner (18 million)! We got this." Jenner's previous record, the first photo of her daughter Stormi, had garnered a total of 18.4 million likes.

The post quickly reached 18.4 million likes in just under 10 days, becoming the most-liked Instagram post at the time. It then continued to rise over 45 million likes in the next 48 hours, surpassing the "Despacito" music video and taking the world record for the most-liked online post (on any media platform) in history. (Note: A source from 14 January 2019 says that with over 25 million likes, the only online post with more likes than the egg is the "Despacito" YouTube music video with 31 million likes; however, the egg as of 23 December 2022 has 58.4 million likes.)

After the account became verified on 14 January 2019, the post rose in popularity and likes, which snowballed into coverage in various media outlets.

By 18 March 2019, the post had accumulated over 53.3 million likes, nearly three times the previous record of 18.4 million. It posted frequent updates for a few days in the form of Instagram Stories.

Alongside the like tally, as of January 2023 the post has 3.8 million comments.

Several individuals tried to claim that they were the account's creator, the claims being dismissed by "the egg" on Instagram direct messages. (Note: One of Instagram star Supreme Patty's crew members drunkenly bragged to a TMZ reporter that Supreme Patty was behind the account. Marketer Ishan Goel also called several news outlets claiming the egg and its success.) On 3 February 2019, the creator of the Instagram egg was revealed by Hulu and The New York Times to be Chris Godfrey, a British advertising creative. Alissa Khan-Whelan, his colleague, was also outed.

On 18 January 2019, the account posted a second picture of an egg, almost identical to the first one apart from a small crack at the top left. As of 25 February 2019, the post accumulated 11.8 million likes. On 22 January 2019, the account posted a third picture of an egg, this time having two larger cracks. In less than 25 minutes, the post accumulated 1 million likes, and by 25 February 2019, it had accumulated 9.5 million likes. On 29 January 2019, a fourth picture of an egg was posted to the account which has another large crack on the right hand side, attracting 7.6 million likes by 25 February 2019. On 1 February 2019, a fifth picture of an egg was posted with stitching like that of a football, referencing the upcoming Super Bowl. That post had accumulated 6.5 million likes by 25 February 2019. The account promised that it would reveal what was inside the egg on 3 February, on the subscription video on demand service Hulu.

The Hulu Instagram egg reveal was used to promote an animation about a mental health campaign. A caption from the clip read, "Recently I've started to crack, the pressure of social media is getting to me. If you're struggling too, talk to someone." The video was later posted on the @world_record_egg Instagram account, and this post received over 33 million views by May 2019. As of May 2020, it had received over 41 million views.

On 16 July 2019, Chris Godfrey (the creator of the account) was listed as one of the top 25 most influential people on the internet, according to Time.

On 20 December 2022, the record for the most-liked Instagram post was surpassed by a post from Argentine footballer Lionel Messi, showing him and his teammates celebrating after winning the 2022 FIFA World Cup with their national team. The world record egg responded to being overtaken in likes by Messi with "Today [Lionel Messi] has taken the crown, for now. But I'm still left with one question… Who is the greatest of all time – Cristiano Ronaldo or Leo Messi?"

The account sold to Dubai-based investor Mustafa El Fishawy in April 2024 for an undisclosed seven-figure sum. Reed Smith, who advised Godfrey, Brown, and Khan-Whelan in the transaction, stated they opted to sell it to "focus on new ventures." On 3 June, @world_record_egg posted an egg with the flag of Palestine in support of the country during the Gaza war; the post's caption described it as an "Egg for Peace" and hoped to "set a new world record together and get the most liked post on Instagram for a good cause."

== Reception ==
In response to breaking the world record for the most-liked Instagram post, the account's owner wrote "This is madness. What a time to be alive." Hours later, Jenner posted a video on Instagram of her cracking open an egg and pouring its yolk onto the ground, with the caption: "Take that little egg."

Pundits pontificated on the meaning of the egg picture's dominance over social media's "first family". As Vogue observed, tapping a heart pictogram is easy, and eggs are "lovable". More pointedly:

[T]he attention economy is a scam based on requiring little to no labor from both producer and consumer despite commanding the most space, and therefore value, in our digital lives... but it very well could be: As a metaphor for the fragility of the influencer ecosystem, the egg has broken the Internet.

The significance of the event and its massive republishing are a topic of discussion. (Note: "You can roll your eyes and say, great, the world is falling apart and we are talking about an egg. Or you could say that we're talking about an egg because the world is falling apart. It's bleak out there, and the egg is a feel-good story, a kind of social media rags-to-riches tale.")

A University of Westminster researcher of internet memes compared it to the movement to name a scientific research vessel in the United Kingdom as Boaty McBoatface.

The Instagrammer's success is a rare victory for the unpaid viral campaign on social media. "There is a bit of an anti-celebrity revolt here – 'look what we can do with a simple egg'"

The researcher suggests that the accomplishment of becoming such a widely heralded unpaid viral post may become increasingly rare, as social networks rely more on paid and business promotion.

The post's spread has been characterized as a populist backlash against "consumerism" and is seen by some as a triumph of community over celebrity. However, propelled by their popular success, the creators promised to release 'egg-centric' memorabilia.

Hundreds of games based on the Instagram egg have appeared on Apple's App Store. The creators of the Instagram egg also reached a deal to promote Hulu.

== See also ==
- List of Internet phenomena
