= Bulimia =

Eating disorder

Bulimia nervosa
- Other names: Bulimia
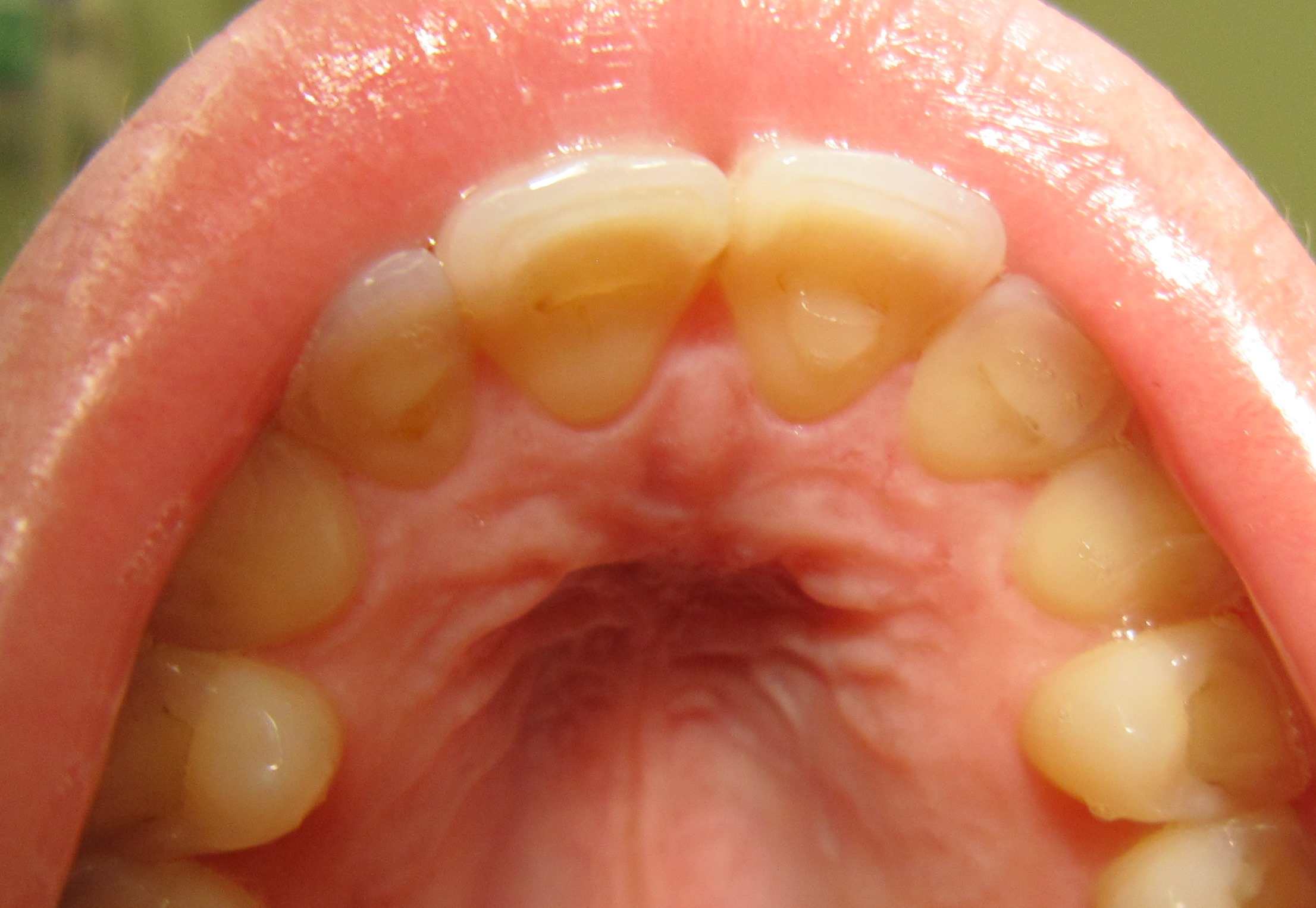
- Loss of enamel (acid erosion) from the inside of the upper front teeth as a result of bulimia
- Specialty: Psychiatry, clinical psychology
- Symptoms: Eating a large amount of food in a short amount of time followed by vomiting or the use of laxatives, often normal weight
- Complications: Breakdown of the teeth, depression, anxiety, substance use disorders, suicide
- Causes: Genetic and environmental factors
- Diagnostic method: Based on person's medical history
- Differential diagnosis: Anorexia nervosa, binge eating disorder, Kleine-Levin syndrome, borderline personality disorder
- Treatment: Cognitive behavioral therapy
- Medication: Selective serotonin reuptake inhibitors, tricyclic antidepressant
- Prognosis: Half recover over 10 years with treatment
- Frequency: 3.6 million (2015)

Bulimia nervosa (/bʊliːmiənɜːrvoʊsə/) (BN), also known simply as bulimia, is an eating disorder characterized by binge eating (eating large quantities of food in a short period of time, often feeling out of control) followed by compensatory behaviors, such as self-induced vomiting, abuse of diuretics or laxatives to prevent weight gain.

Bulimia is more common among those who have a close relative with the condition. The percentage risk that is estimated to be due to genetics is between 30% and 80%. Other risk factors for the disease include psychological stress, cultural pressure to attain a certain body type, poor self-esteem, and obesity. Living in a culture that commercializes or glamorizes dieting, and having parental figures who fixate on weight are also risks.

Diagnosis is based on a person's medical history; however, this is difficult, as people are usually secretive about their binge eating and purging habits. Further, the diagnosis of anorexia nervosa takes precedence over that of bulimia. Other similar disorders include binge eating disorder, Kleine–Levin syndrome, and borderline personality disorder.

== Signs and symptoms ==
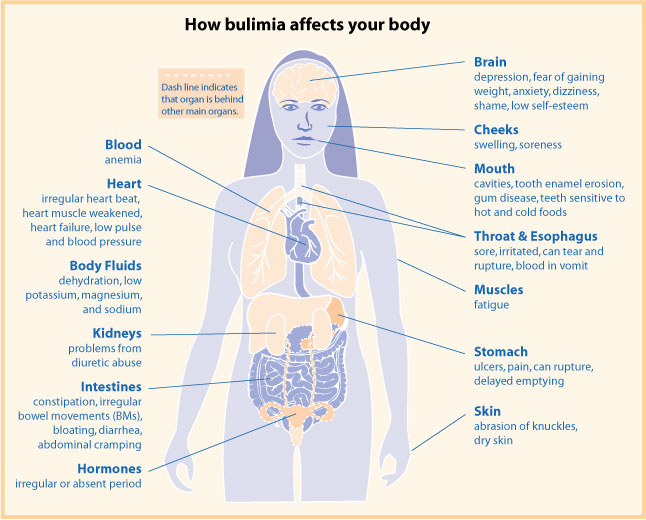
How bulimia affects the body

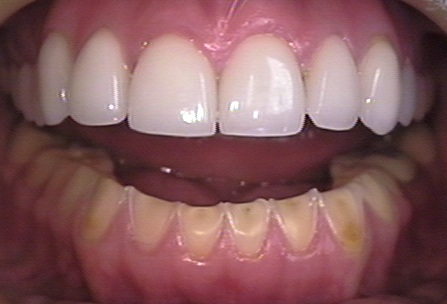
The erosion on the lower teeth was caused by bulimia. For comparison, the upper teeth were restored with porcelain veneers.

Bulimia typically involves rapid and out-of-control eating, which is followed by self-induced vomiting or other forms of purging. This cycle may be repeated several times a week or, in more serious cases, several times a day and may directly cause:

- Dehydration
- Electrolyte imbalance can lead to abnormal heart rhythms, cardiac arrest, and even death
- Dark circles, sunken eyes, and abnormal skin color, often caused by electrolyte deficiency/imbalance and vitamin deficiency. Often seen with more long-term cases of bulimia.
- Vitamin deficiencies, especially seen with Zinc, Vitamin A, Vitamin B, and Vitamin C.
- Oral trauma, lacerations to the lining of the mouth due to forced throwing up movements.
- Torn/Damaged gums & interior lining of the cheeks is often seen.
- Reduced Gum Line.The gun line on each individual tooth will be lower causing the roots to be more exposed. Seen in above image.
- Esophageal and Gastrointestinal Tearing, Can lead to internal bleeding, which can be painless, leaving the person unaware that they are internally bleeding out.
- Erosion of enamel on the back and edges of the teeth. Primarily seen in the farthest back molars, and front six teeth top and bottom, most severe in the very front four. Teeth will become more fragile as they thin and chip easily. This can often affect bite, slightly altering face shape and even potentially causing biting the sides of the cheek due to misalignment. Eventually the teeth will be damaged, weakened, and/or shortened enough that crowns or veneers will be necessary. This is caused by the acid stomach acid making contact primarily with those spots.
- Light-Headedness, Dizziness upon Standing or Bending over, and feeling faint. Caused by electrolyte and vitamin deficiency.
- Fatigue and Generalized Weakness. Feeling physically exhausted from physical tasks & movement. Feeling as if you ran a marathon, racing heart, and difficulty breathing.
- Headaches & Migraines, Positional Headaches are often seen, especially when moving or changing positions too quickly. Such as sitting, standing, lying down, or bending over.
- Stomach Ulcers
- Abdominal Wall Hernia. Often one of four types. - Fascial Defect: A small tear or opening in the connective-tissue layer of the abdominal wall. - Abdominal Hernia: Abdominal tissue or an organ, sometimes intestine, pushes through that weakened or opened area. - Bowel herniation: Specifically describes intestine protruding through an abnormal opening. - Incisional Hernia: If the opening is at a previous surgical incision.
- Arrhythmia and/ or Tachycardia.Russell's sign: calluses on knuckles and back of hands due to repeated trauma from incisors
- Swollen salivary glands (in the neck, under the jawline)
- Gastrointestinal problems, like constipation and acid reflux
- Constipation or diarrhea
- Hypotension/Hypertension
- Increased sensitivity within stomach lining & abdominal organs. Bulimics often experience heightened sensation within the stomach, causing it to be uncomfortable/heavy to have food within your system. Often leading to purging feeling like the only option even after getting over the mental factors of the disorder.
- Chemical Dependency. Purging releases endorphins + adrenaline and is often followed by a feeling of satisfaction. Causing it to be very difficult to quit.
- Infertility and/or irregular menstrual cycles. Often shorter menstrual cycles
- Weight Fluctuations
- Changes in the shape of the nose (often caused by long-term damage to the nasal cavity leading to throwing up through the nose repeatedly or long-term heartburn and acid reflux.) The repeated damage to the cartilage inside the nose builds scar tissue which adds mass making the nose appear wider.
- Swelling in the cheeks directly to the side of the mouth, often due to repeated and excessive purging, and over stress of the muscles used in chewing in extreme binge eating.
- Nausea. Often feeling like a hangover, worsening with movement. Caused by an overproduction of stomach acid. These are some of the many signs that may indicate whether someone has bulimia nervosa:
- A fixation on the number of calories consumed
- A fixation on an extreme consciousness of one's weight
- Low self-esteem and/or self-harm
- Suicidal tendencies
- An irregular menstrual cycle in women
- Regular trips to the bathroom, especially soon after eating
- Depression, anxiety disorders, and sleep disorders
- Frequent occurrences involving the consumption of abnormally large portions of food
- The use of laxatives, diuretics, and diet pills
- Compulsive or excessive exercise
- Unhealthy/dry skin, hair, nails, and lips
- Fatigue, or exhaustion As with many psychiatric illnesses, side effects such as delusions can occur, in conjunction with other signs and symptoms, leaving the person with a false belief that is not ordinarily accepted by others.
- People with bulimia nervosa may also exercise to a point that excludes other activities.I

= Causes =
Psychological Causes & Patterns

Bulimia exhibit several interoceptive deficits, in which one experiences impairment in recognizing and discriminating between internal sensations, feelings, and emotions. People with bulimia may also react negatively to somatic and affective states. Regarding interoceptive sensation, hyposensitive individuals may not detect normal feelings of fullness at the appropriate time while eating, and are prone to eating more calories in a short period of time as a result of this decreased sensitivity.

Examining from a neural basis also connects elements of interoception and emotion; notable overlaps occur in the medial prefrontal cortex, anterior and posterior cingulate, and anterior insula cortices, which are linked to both interoception and emotional eating.

People with bulimia are at a higher risk to have an affective disorder, such as depression or general anxiety disorder. One study found 70% had depression at some time in their lives (as opposed to 26% for adult females in the general population), rising to 88% for all affective disorders combined. Another study in the Journal of Affective Disorders found that of the population of patients that were diagnosed with an eating disorder according to the DSM-V guidelines about 27% also suffered from bipolar disorder. Within this article, the majority of the patients were diagnosed with bulimia nervosa, the second most common condition reported was binge-eating disorder. Some individuals with anorexia nervosa exhibit episodes of bulimic tendencies through purging (either through self-induced vomiting or laxatives) as a way to quickly remove food in their system. There may be an increased risk for diabetes mellitus type 2. Bulimia also has negative effects on a person's teeth due to the acid passed through the mouth from frequent vomiting causing acid erosion, mainly on the posterior dental surface. Research has shown that there is a relationship between bulimia and narcissism. According to a study by the Australian National University, eating disorders are more susceptible among vulnerable narcissists. This can be caused by a childhood in which inner feelings and thoughts were minimized by parents, leading to "a high focus on receiving validation from others to maintain a positive sense of self".

The medical journal Borderline Personality Disorder and Emotion Dysregulation notes that a "substantial rate of patients with bulimia nervosa" also have borderline personality disorder. A study by the Psychopharmacology Research Program of the University of Cincinnati College of Medicine "leaves little doubt that bipolar and eating disorders—particularly bulimia nervosa and bipolar II disorder—are related." The research shows that most clinical studies indicate that patients with bipolar disorder have higher rates of eating disorders, and vice versa. There is overlap in phenomenology, course, comorbidity, family history, and pharmacologic treatment response of these disorders. This is especially true of "eating dysregulation, mood dysregulation, impulsivity and compulsivity, craving for activity and/or exercise." Studies have shown a relationship between bulimia's effect on metabolic rate and caloric intake with thyroid dysfunction.

Scientific research has shown that people suffering from bulimia have decreased volumes of brain matter, and that the abnormalities are reversible after long-term recovery.

Biological Causes

As with anorexia nervosa, there is evidence of genetic predispositions contributing to the onset of this eating disorder. Abnormal levels of many hormones, notably serotonin, have been shown to be responsible for some disordered eating behaviors. Brain-derived neurotrophic factor (BDNF) is under investigation as a possible mechanism.

There is evidence that sex hormones may influence appetite and eating in women and the onset of bulimia nervosa. Studies have shown that women with hyperandrogenism and polyendocrine metabolic ovarian syndrome (PMOS) have a dysregulation of appetite, along with carbohydrates and fats. This dysregulation of appetite is also seen in women with bulimia nervosa. There is evidence that there is an association between polymorphisms in the ERβ (estrogen receptor β) and bulimia, suggesting there is a correlation between sex hormones and bulimia nervosa.

Bulimia has been compared to drug addiction, though the empirical support for this characterization is limited. However, people with bulimia nervosa may share dopamine D2 receptor-related vulnerabilities with those with substance use disorders.

Dieting, a common behaviour in bulimics, is associated with lower plasma tryptophan levels. Decreased tryptophan levels in the brain, and thus the synthesis of serotonin, such as via acute tryptophan depletion, increases bulimic urges in currently and formerly bulimic individuals within hours.

Abnormal blood levels of peptides important for the regulation of appetite and energy balance are observed in individuals with bulimia nervosa, but it remains unknown if this is a state or trait.

In recent years, evolutionary psychiatry as an emerging scientific discipline has been studying mental disorders from an evolutionary perspective. If eating disorders, bulimia nervosa in particular, have evolutionary functions or if they are new modern "lifestyle" problems is still debated.

Social Causes & Implications

Media portrayals of an 'ideal' body shape are widely considered to be a contributing factor to bulimia. In a 1991 study by Weltzin, Hsu, Pollicle, and Kaye, it was stated that 19% of bulimics undereat, 37% of bulimics eat an average or normal amount of food, and 44% of bulimics overeat. A survey of 15- to 18-year-old high school girls in Nadroga, Fiji, found the self-reported incidence of purging rose from 0% in 1995 (a few weeks after the introduction of television in the province) to 11.3% in 1998. In addition, the suicide rate among people with bulimia nervosa is 7.5 times higher than in the general population.

When attempting to decipher the origin of bulimia nervosa in a cognitive context, Christopher Fairburn et al.'s cognitive-behavioral model is often considered the golden standard. Fairburn et al.'s model discusses the process in which an individual falls into the binge-purge cycle and thus develops bulimia. Fairburn et al. argue that extreme concern with weight and shape coupled with low self-esteem will result in strict, rigid, and inflexible dietary rules. Accordingly, this would lead to unrealistically restricted eating, which may consequently induce an eventual "slip" where the individual commits a minor infraction of the strict and inflexible dietary rules. Moreover, the cognitive distortion due to dichotomous thinking leads the individual to binge. The binge subsequently should trigger a perceived loss of control, promoting the individual to purge in hope of counteracting the binge. However, Fairburn et al. assert the cycle repeats itself, and thus consider the binge-purge cycle to be self-perpetuating.

In contrast, Byrne and Mclean's findings differed slightly from Fairburn et al.'s cognitive-behavioral model of bulimia nervosa in that the drive for thinness was the major cause of purging as a way of controlling weight. In turn, Byrne and Mclean argued that this makes the individual vulnerable to binging, indicating that it is not a binge-purge cycle but rather a purge-binge cycle in that purging comes before bingeing. Similarly, Fairburn et al.'s cognitive-behavioral model of bulimia nervosa is not necessarily applicable to every individual and is certainly reductionist. Every one differs from another, and taking such a complex behavior like bulimia and applying the same one theory to everyone would certainly be invalid. In addition, the cognitive-behavioral model of bulimia nervosa is very culturally bound in that it may not be necessarily applicable to cultures outside of Western society. To evaluate, Fairburn et al..'s model and more generally the cognitive explanation of bulimia nervosa is more descriptive than explanatory, as it does not necessarily explain how bulimia arises. Furthermore, it is difficult to ascertain cause and effect, because it may be that distorted eating leads to distorted cognition rather than vice versa.

A considerable amount of literature has identified a correlation between sexual abuse and the development of bulimia nervosa. The reported incident rate of unwanted sexual contact is higher among those with bulimia nervosa than anorexia nervosa.

When exploring the etiology of bulimia through a socio-cultural perspective, the "thin ideal internalization" is significantly responsible. The thin-ideal internalization is the extent to which individuals adapt to the societal ideals of attractiveness. Studies have shown that young women that read fashion magazines tend to have more bulimic symptoms than those women who do not. This further demonstrates the impact of media on the likelihood of developing the disorder. Individuals first accept and "buy into" the ideals, and then attempt to transform themselves in order to reflect the societal ideals of attractiveness. J. Kevin Thompson and Eric Stice claim that family, peers, and most evidently media reinforce the thin ideal, which may lead to an individual accepting and "buying into" the thin ideal. In turn, Thompson and Stice assert that if the thin ideal is accepted, one could begin to feel uncomfortable with their body shape or size since it may not necessarily reflect the thin ideal set out by society. Thus, people feeling uncomfortable with their bodies may result in body dissatisfaction and may develop a certain drive for thinness. Consequently, body dissatisfaction coupled with a drive for thinness is thought to promote dieting and negative effects, which could eventually lead to bulimic symptoms such as purging or bingeing. Binges lead to self-disgust which causes purging to prevent weight gain.

A study dedicated to investigating the thin ideal internalization as a factor of bulimia nervosa is Thompson's and Stice's research. Their study aimed to investigate how and to what degree media affects the thin ideal internalization. Thompson and Stice used randomized experiments (more specifically programs) dedicated to teaching young women how to be more critical when it comes to media, to reduce thin-ideal internalization. The results showed that by creating more awareness of the media's control of the societal ideal of attractiveness, the thin ideal internalization significantly dropped. In other words, less thin ideal images portrayed by the media resulted in less thin-ideal internalization. Therefore, Thompson and Stice concluded that media greatly affected the thin ideal internalization. Papies showed that it is not the thin ideal itself, but rather the self-association with other persons of a certain weight that decide how someone with bulimia nervosa feels. People that associate themselves with thin models get in a positive attitude when they see thin models and people that associate with overweight get in a negative attitude when they see thin models. Moreover, it can be taught to associate with thinner people.

It has also been suggested that the emergence of bulimia nervosa in the 20th century can be attributed to changes in normative cultural techniques for shaping the female body, namely the replacement of the corset by dieting. More broadly speaking, this change can be seen as part of a broader "civilizing" process wherein extensive self-control, in this case in the form of strict dietary regimens, is championed.

== Diagnosis ==
The onset of bulimia nervosa is often during adolescence, between 13 and 20 years of age, and many cases have previously experienced obesity, with many relapsing in adulthood into episodic bingeing and purging even after initially successful treatment and remission. A lifetime prevalence of 0.5 percent and 0.9 percent for adults and adolescents, respectively, is estimated among the United States population. Bulimia nervosa may affect up to 1% of young women and, after 10 years of diagnosis, half will recover fully, a third will recover partially, and 10–20% will still have symptoms.

Adolescents with bulimia nervosa are more likely to have self-imposed perfectionism and compulsivity issues in eating compared to their peers. This means that the high expectations and unrealistic goals that these individuals set for themselves are internally motivated rather than by social views or expectations.

=== Criteria ===
Bulimia Nervosa is diagnosed using the Diagnostic and Statistical Manual of Mental Disorders (DSM-5). The diagnostic criteria include the following:

- Recurrent episodes of binge eating
- Recurrent inappropriate compensatory behavior to prevent weight gain, like self-induced vomiting, misuse of laxatives or other medications, fasting, or excessive exercise.
- The binge eating and compensatory behaviors both occur at least once a week for three months
- Self-evaluation is influenced by body shape and weight.

Other methods are also used to narrow down the diagnosis, such as physical exams (measuring height, weight, and vitals, or checking skin, nails, heart and lungs), or lab tests (for blood count, electrolytes, protein, or urinalysis).

== Treatment ==
There are two main types of treatment given to those with bulimia nervosa; psychopharmacological and psychosocial treatments.

=== Psychotherapy ===
Cognitive behavioral therapy (CBT) is considered the gold standard for the treatment of bulimia nervosa. This approach focuses on helping patients identify and change distorted thought patterns related to eating, body image, and self worth.

CBT helps patients identify and challenge the distorted thinking individuals might have about food, weight and body image. It also helps by offering the chance to identify the unhelpful thoughts about food and body image.

By using CBT people record how much food they eat and periods of vomiting with the purpose of identifying and avoiding emotional fluctuations that bring on episodes of bulimia on a regular basis, as a component of this therapy is food journaling. CBT is necessarily good for those with bulimia as it targets the binge-purge cycle, which is the hallmark of bulimia. People undergoing CBT who exhibit early behavioral changes are most likely to achieve the best treatment outcomes in the long run.

Researchers have also reported some positive outcomes for interpersonal psychotherapy and dialectical behavior therapy. These therapies have good outcomes for treating bulimia, especially in patients with emotional regulation difficulties or interpersonal issues. While these therapies are not as extensively researched as CBT, they can be beneficial when integrated into a comprehensive treatment plan.

For adolescents, Family-Based therapy (FBT) has been identified as an effective treatment. FBT involves the family in the treatment process, where parents are empowered to take an active role in helping their child recover from bulimia nervosa. This approach is particularly helpful in younger patients who are still living with their families

The use of CBT has been shown to be quite effective for treating bulimia nervosa (BN) in adults, but little research has been done on effective treatments of BN for adolescents. Although CBT is seen as more cost-efficient and helps individuals with BN in self-guided care, Family Based Treatment (FBT) might be more helpful to younger adolescents who need more support and guidance from their families. Adolescents are at the stage where their brains are still quite malleable and developing gradually. Therefore, young adolescents with BN are less likely to realize the detrimental consequences of becoming bulimic and have less motivation to change, which is why FBT would be useful to have families intervene and support the teens. Working with BN patients and their families in FBT can empower the families by having them involved in their adolescent's food choices and behaviors, taking more control of the situation in the beginning and gradually letting the adolescent become more autonomous when they have learned healthier eating habits.

=== Medication ===
Antidepressants, particularly selective serotonin reuptake inhibitors (SSRI), are often prescribed to treat bulimia nervosa, especially when comorbid depression or anxiety disorders are present. However, medications alone are generally not sufficient and are typically used in conjunction with psychotherapy. Compared to placebo, the use of a single antidepressant has been shown to be effective. Combining medication with counseling can improve outcomes in some circumstances. Some positive outcomes of treatments can include: abstinence from binge eating, a decrease in obsessive behaviors to lose weight and in shape preoccupation, less severe psychiatric symptoms, a desire to counter the effects of binge eating, as well as an improvement in social functioning and reduced relapse rates.

A combination of psychotherapy, especially CBT and pharmacological treatments, such as SSRIs, often lead to better outcomes for individuals with bulimia. Combining both approaches is particularly beneficial in severe or chronic cases, where behavioral modification and mood stabilization are crucial.

=== Alternative Medicine ===
Some researchers have also claimed positive outcomes in hypnotherapy. The first use of hypnotherapy in bulimic patients was in 1981. When it comes to hypnotherapy, bulimic patients are easier to hypnotize than anorexia nervosa patients. In bulimic patients, hypnotherapy focuses on learning self-control when it comes to binging and vomiting, strengthening stimulus control techniques, enhancing ones ego, improving weight control, and helping overweight patients see their body differently (have a different image).

=== Risk factors ===
Being female and having bulimia nervosa takes a toll on mental health. Women frequently reported an onset of anxiety at the same time of the onset of bulimia nervosa. The approximate female-to-male ratio of diagnosis is 10:1. In addition to cognitive, genetic, and environmental factors, childhood gastrointestinal problems and early pubertal maturation also increase the likelihood of developing bulimia nervosa. Another concern with eating disorders is developing a coexisting substance use disorder.

Sociocultural factors also contribute significantly to the development of bulimia nervosa. Exposure to thin-ideal body standards in Western media, weight stigma, and appearance-based social comparison—particularly through social media—have been associated with increased body dissatisfaction and disordered eating behaviors. Research suggests that internalization of cultural beauty ideals and pressure to conform to specific body types may increase vulnerability to binge–purge cycles, especially among adolescents and young adults. These influences can interact with psychological traits such as perfectionism and low self-esteem, further elevating risk.

== Epidemiology ==
Deaths due to eating disorders per million persons in 2012 0 1 2 3 4–25

There is little data on the percentage of people with bulimia in general populations. Most studies conducted thus far have been on convenience samples from hospital patients, high school or university students; research on bulimia nervosa among ethnic minorities has also been limited. Existing studies have yielded a wide range of results: between 0.1% and 1.4% of males, and between 0.3% and 9.4% of females. Studies on time trends in the prevalence of bulimia nervosa have also yielded inconsistent results. According to Gelder, Mayou and Geddes (2005) bulimia nervosa is prevalent between 1 and 2 percent of women aged 15–40 years. Bulimia nervosa occurs more frequently in developed countries and in cities, with one study finding that bulimia is five times more prevalent in cities than in rural areas. There is a perception that bulimia is most prevalent amongst girls from middle-class families; however, in a 2009 study girls from families in the lowest income bracket studied were 153 percent more likely to be bulimic than girls from the highest income bracket. According to a study conducted in 2022 by Silen et al., which conglomerated statistics using various methods such as SCID, MRFS, EDE, SSAGA, and EDDI, the US, Finland, Australia, and the Netherlands had an estimated 2.1%, 2.4%, 1.0%, and 0.8% prevalence of bulimia nervosa among females under 30 years of age. This demonstrates the prevalence of bulimia nervosa in developed, Western, first-world countries, indicating an urgency in treating adolescent women. Additionally, these statistics may be misrepresentative of the true population affected with bulimia nervosa due to potential underreporting bias.

There are higher rates of eating disorders in groups involved in activities which idealize a slim physique, such as dance, gymnastics, modeling, cheerleading, running, acting, swimming, diving, rowing and figure skating. Bulimia is thought to be more prevalent among whites; however, a 2012 study showed that African-American teenage girls were 50 percent more likely than white girls to exhibit bulimic behavior, including both binging and purging.

Country	Year	Sample size and type	% affected	
Portugal	2006	2,028 high school students		0.3% female
Brazil	2004	1,807 students (ages 7–19)	0.8% male	1.3% female
Spain	2004	2,509 female adolescents (ages 13–22)		1.4% female
Hungary	2003	580 Budapest residents	0.4% male	3.6% female
Australia	1998	4,200 high school students	0.3% combined	
United States	1996	1,152 college students	0.2% male	1.3% female
Norway	1995	19,067 psychiatric patients	0.7% male	7.3% female
Canada	1995	8,116 (random sample)	0.1% male	1.1% female
Japan	1995	2,597 high school students	0.7% male	1.9% female
United States	1992	799 college students	0.4% male	5.1% female

== History ==
=== Etymology ===
The term bulimia comes from Greek βουλιμία boulīmía, "ravenous hunger", a compound of βοῦς bous, "ox" and λιμός, līmos, "hunger". Literally, the scientific name of the disorder, bulimia nervosa, translates to "nervous ravenous hunger".

The Greek word boulīmiáō (to suffer from boulīmía) was used by Xenophon in his Anabasis around 370 BCE, describing an affliction suffered by Greek mercenaries crossing a snowy mountain pass in Asia Minor. However, this affliction, which involved syncope (fainting) and was alleviated by eating, seems to have been hypoglycemia (low blood sugar) rather than what is known today as bulimia. The Greek term, also occurring sometimes as βούλιμος boúlīmos, for a long time remained associated with a sudden collapse in extremely cold conditions, as described by authors such as Aristotle (384–322 BCE) and Plutarch (c. 50–120 CE). This fainting disorder was described in more detail in a work attributed to Galen (129–c. 216 CE), from whose time on it was often discussed together with another disorder called fames canina (dog's appetite, a disorder characterized by excessive eating followed by vomiting) by physicians ranging from Alexander of Tralles (c. 525–605) over Avicenna (c. 980–1037 CE) to Petrus Forestus (1521–1597). Only in the 18th century was syncope (fainting) removed from the symptoms associated with bulimia, and the term eventually came to be lumped together with fames canina as a disorder mainly characterized by excessive appetite.

=== Before the 20th century ===
Although diagnostic criteria for bulimia nervosa did not appear until 1979, evidence suggests that binging and purging were popular in certain ancient cultures. In ancient Egypt, physicians recommended purging once a month for three days to preserve health. This practice stemmed from the belief that human diseases were caused by the food itself. In ancient Rome, elite society members would vomit to "make room" in their stomachs for more food at all-day banquets. Emperors Claudius and Vitellius both were gluttonous and obese, and they often resorted to habitual purging.

Historical records also suggest that some saints who developed anorexia (as a result of a life of asceticism) may also have displayed bulimic behaviors. Saint Mary Magdalen de Pazzi (1566–1607) and Saint Veronica Giuliani (1660–1727) were both observed binge eating—giving in, as they believed, to the temptations of the devil. Saint Catherine of Siena (1347–1380) is known to have supplemented her strict abstinence from food by purging as reparation for her sins. Catherine died from starvation at age thirty-three.

While the psychological disorder "bulimia nervosa" is relatively new, the word "bulimia", signifying overeating, has been present for centuries. The Babylon Talmud referenced practices of "bulimia", yet scholars believe that this simply referred to overeating without the purging or the psychological implications bulimia nervosa. In fact, a search for evidence of bulimia nervosa from the 17th to late 19th century revealed that only a quarter of the overeating cases they examined actually vomited after the binges. There was no evidence of deliberate vomiting or an attempt to control weight.

=== 20th century ===
Globally, bulimia was estimated to affect 3.6 million people in 2015. About 1% of young women have bulimia at a given point in time and about 2% to 3% of women have the condition at some point in their lives. The condition is less common in the developing world. Bulimia is about nine times more likely to occur in women than men. Among women, rates are highest in young adults. Bulimia was named and first described by the British psychiatrist Gerald Russell in 1979.

At the beginning of the 20th century, bulimia (overeating) was described as a clinical symptom in anorexic patients. Ludwig Binswanger published the description of a patient Irma in 1909 who at one point seems to have fulfilled modern-day diagnostic criteria for bulimia nervosa, although otherwise her symptoms were atypical. Mosche Wulff, in 1932, published a study of four patients with binge-eating. Of these, patient D would have periods of intense cravings for sweet and starchy food and overeat for weeks, which often resulted in frequent vomiting, while patient C binged and tried to lose weight without vomiting. Patient D, who grew up with a tyrannical father, was repulsed by her weight and would fast for a few days, rapidly losing weight. Ellen West, a patient described by Ludwig Binswanger in 1944, was teased by friends for being fat and excessively took thyroid pills to lose weight, later using laxatives and vomiting. She reportedly consumed dozens of oranges and several pounds of tomatoes each day, yet would skip meals. After being admitted to a psychiatric facility for depression, Ellen ate ravenously yet lost weight, presumably due to self-induced vomiting.

One explanation for the increase in anorexia nervosa and bulimia nervosa which share a fear of being or becoming overweight may be due to the ideals of bodily thinness and the new cultural technique of dieting that gradually substituted the corset in the late 19th and early 20th century.

In 1979, Gerald Russell first published a description of bulimia nervosa, in which he studied patients with a "morbid fear of becoming fat" who overate and purged afterward. He specified treatment options and indicated the seriousness of the disease, which can be accompanied by depression and suicide. In 1980, bulimia nervosa first appeared in the DSM-III.

After its appearance in the DSM-III, there was a sudden rise in the documented incidents of bulimia nervosa. Patients reported that the reclassification of binge-purging as a psychiatric disorder brought relief through feeling less guilty and more easily finding help. In the early 1980s, incidents of the disorder rose to about 40 in every 100,000 people. This decreased to about 27 in every 100,000 people at the end of the 1980s/early 1990s. However, bulimia nervosa's prevalence was still much higher than anorexia nervosa's, which at the time occurred in about 14 people per 100,000.

In 1991, Kendler et al. documented the cumulative risk for bulimia nervosa for those born before 1950, from 1950 to 1959, and after 1959. The risk for those born after 1959 is much higher than those in either of the other cohorts.

=== 21st century ===
In the 21st century, bulimia nervosa remains a significant public health concern. Data from 2001 to 2003 indicates that approximately 0.3% of U.S. adults experience bulimia nervosa in a given year, with a higher prevalence among females (0.5%) compared to males (0.1%).

Globally, the age-standardized prevalence rates of bulimia nervosa increased from 134.19 per 100,000 individuals in 1990 to 160.25 per 100,000 in 2017, with an average annual increase of 0.71 per 100,000. Similarly, the age-standardized DALY rates for bulimia nervosa rose from 28.26 per 100,000 in 1990 to 33.85 per 100,000 in 2017, reflecting an annual increase of 0.72 per 100,000.

== See also ==
- Anorectic Behavior Observation Scale
- Eating recovery
- Evolutionary psychiatry
- List of people with bulimia nervosa
