= Burbach =

Burbach is a name meaning "farmer's brook" (from Old High German bur "farmer" + bach "brook"). It can refer to:

== Places in Germany ==
- Burbach, North Rhine-Westphalia, municipality in Siegen-Wittgenstein district
- Burbach, Rhineland-Palatinate, municipality in Bitburg-Prüm district
- Alstädten-Burbach, district of Hürth municipality, North Rhine-Westphalia
- districts of either
  - Halver municipality, North Rhine-Westphalia
  - Saarbrücken municipality, Saarland
  - Marxzell, Baden-Württemberg
  - Wutha-Farnroda, Thuringia
  - Niederhambach, Rhineland-Palatinate

== Places in France ==
- Burbach, Bas-Rhin, France

== Places in England ==
- Burbach, an old name for Burbage, Wiltshire, England

== People ==
- Bill Burbach (born 1947), New York Yankees baseball player
- Frank Burbach (born 1945), German diplomat and jurist
- Yvonne Burbach (born 1975), German actress
