= Amateur Hour (album) =

Live album by Bob Odenkirk featuring Brandon Wardell
- Released: November 25, 2014
- Recorded: NerdMelt Theater; Los Angeles, 2014
- Genre: Comedy
- Length: 58:27
- Label: Aspecialthing

Brandon Wardell chronology
Amateur Hour (2014)	An ASMR Album (2018)

Bob Odenkirk chronology
Amateur Hour (2014)

Amateur Hour is a live comedy album released by Bob Odenkirk and Brandon Wardell released on November 25, 2014 through Aspecialthing Records.

== Track listing ==
Brandon Wardell
No.	Title	Length
1.	"Cars and Weed"	2:37
2.	"Rap Music"	4:01
3.	"Women"	2:14
4.	"I Didn't Mean To End My Set Like This"	1:22

Bob Odenkirk
No.	Title	Length
5.	"The Stakes"	1:54
6.	"The Internet"	2:22
7.	"The Elderly"	3:20
8.	"The Television"	4:12
9.	"The Pope"	2:34
10.	"The Statue"	1:47
11.	"The Congo"	3:05
12.	"The Candidate"	3:03
13.	"The Kids"	4:29
14.	"The Fear"	3:25
15.	"The Monkees"	2:48
16.	"The Bears"	3:18

Extras
No.	Title	Length
17.	"How To Do Standing Comedy By Sir Lev Gravier" (featuring Eric Hoffman)	1:59
18.	"Have You What It Takes?"	2:51
19.	"A Parlour Sketch"	2:12
20.	"Buskers' Phrases"	3:28

== Accolades ==
Publication	Country	Accolade	Year	Rank
The A.V. Club	US	The 10 Best Comedy Albums of 2014	2014	3
