= SubwayCreatures =

SubwayCreatures is an internet brand run by Rick McGuire focused on documenting "train-riding oddities". When McGuire first moved to New York City from New Jersey in 2010, he said he "saw the craziest stuff on the subway". He then decided to begin documenting what he saw on a website, which he named SubwayCreatures. Not long after he created the website, he created an Instagram page, where he then started posting most of his content.

== History ==
McGuire says he has always had an interest in people-watching. He moved to New York City in 2010 and started the SubwayCreatures website not long after, where he started documenting the strange things he saw as a hobby. Once he created the SubwayCreatures Instagram account, however, it grew into a "social media phenomenon". As the Instagram account became more popular it began to get more mainstream attention, including being reached out to by several different news outlets. Over time SubwayCreatures has become less reliant on McGuire's personal content, and more reliant on user-submitted content. On November 20, 2017, a blog post was uploaded to the website saying the Instagram account had been hacked and all of the photos and videos had been removed. McGuire stated he was not sure if he could get all of his content back, but if he could not he would start over from scratch.

== Content ==
SubwayCreatures is mainly focused on pictures and videos of odd riders found on subways. The Instagram consists of pictures, and videos both taken by McGuire himself and user-submitted, while the website mainly focuses on longer video clips and comments. McGuire has stated that he will remove footage of anyone who has been captured if they so request. He has also said he will not exploit the homeless, disabled, or children for views.
