= Eddy Burback =

American comedian (born 1996)

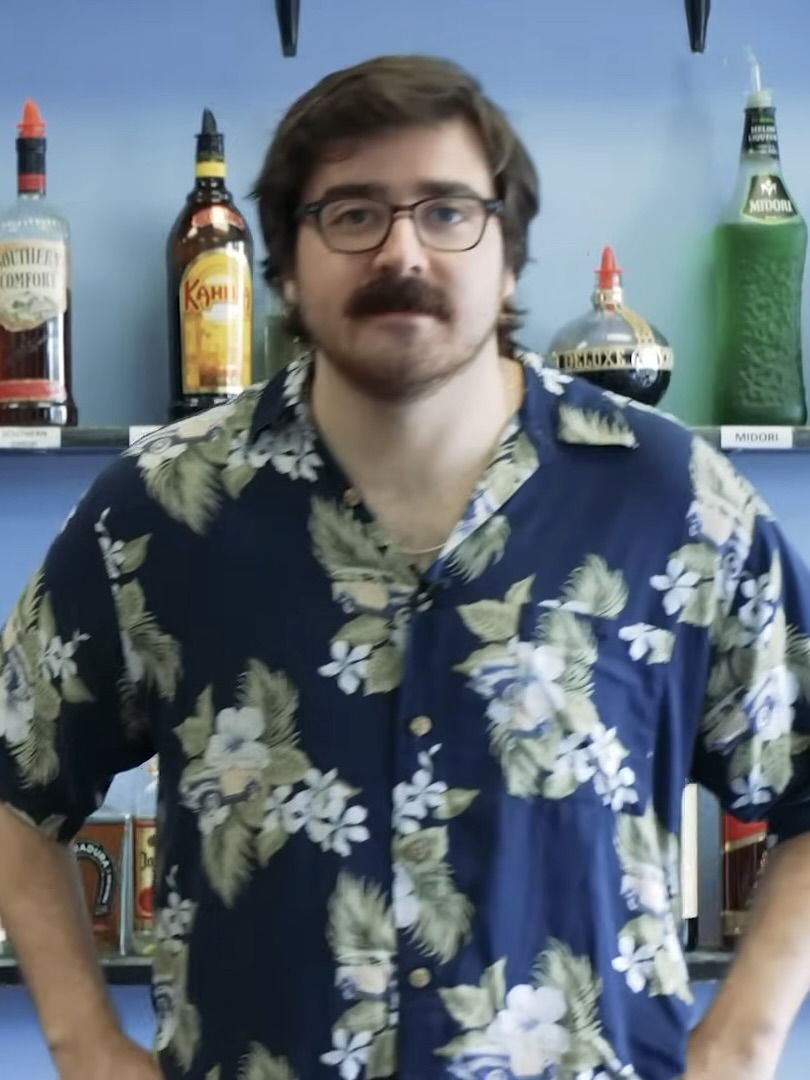
- Burback in 2022
- Born: Edward Burback; November 28, 1996 (age 29); Illinois, U.S.
- Years active: 2016–present

YouTube information
- Channel: Eddy Burback
- Genres: Comedy; challenge; vlog
- Subscribers: 2.27 million
- Views: 193 million
- Last updated: July 16, 2026

Edward Burback (born November 28, 1996) is an American comedian, vlogger, and video essayist.

== YouTube channel ==
Having an early childhood interest in filmmaking through home movies with his family, Burback joined YouTube on June 27, 2011. He began uploading videos to his channel in 2016 and signed with the talent management agency Odd Projects in November 2022. The content of Burback's channel is diverse and lacks a single theme; it includes comedic reactions to old pop cultural phenomena, attempts at completing niche challenges, and commentary about social issues. Although he started off releasing stationary commentary videos every few weeks, Burback's channel underwent a shift around 2022 to infrequently uploading unusual travelogues and extensive video essays.

One video essay from March 2023 details Burback's critical allegations against the MrBeast Burger restaurant chain. ChatGPT Made Me Delusional (2025) is a documentary-style video which critically investigates how the generative AI chatbot ChatGPT can feed into psychosis. Another from 2025 details his experiment in living life with his smartphone locked in a safe for a month.

Among his travelogues include a video from 2022, which records his trip with vlogger Ted Nivison to visit all 18 Rainforest Cafe establishments in the United States and Canada over 22 days. A similar video from July 2023 shows their trip to all 22 Margaritaville restaurants in both countries.

=== Reception ===
Chris Almeida of The New York Times referred to Burback as a "prime example" of a successful YouTuber bucking the influence of "MrBeast-ification" on the platform. Bee Wertheimer of Kotaku commented that Burback's documentary on ChatGPT had popularized an emerging genre of "seemingly normal people jokingly using AI chatbots and discovering things can get weird very quickly".

== Personal life and other ventures ==
Edward Burback was born on November 28, 1996, alongside his twin brother Tony, whom he has described as "very close our entire lives". Burback hails from the suburbs of Chicago. In 2018, he moved to Los Angeles to collaborate and live with fellow content creator Gus Johnson. By 2020, the roommates were creating short comedic videos and also hosted a podcast together. Eddy and Tony Burback together run the separate channel "Burback", where they cover video games from their 1990s childhood. Although he occasionally shares his personal life experiences on YouTube, Burback has expressed concerns about establishing a parasocial relationship with his viewers. In June 2024, Burback and Nivison participated in Creators for Palestine to help raise money for humanitarian aid to Gaza.

== Awards ==
Award	Year	Category	Result	Ref.
Shorty Awards	2020	YouTube Comedian	Finalist	
