= Decline of newspapers =

Decline of newspaper sales

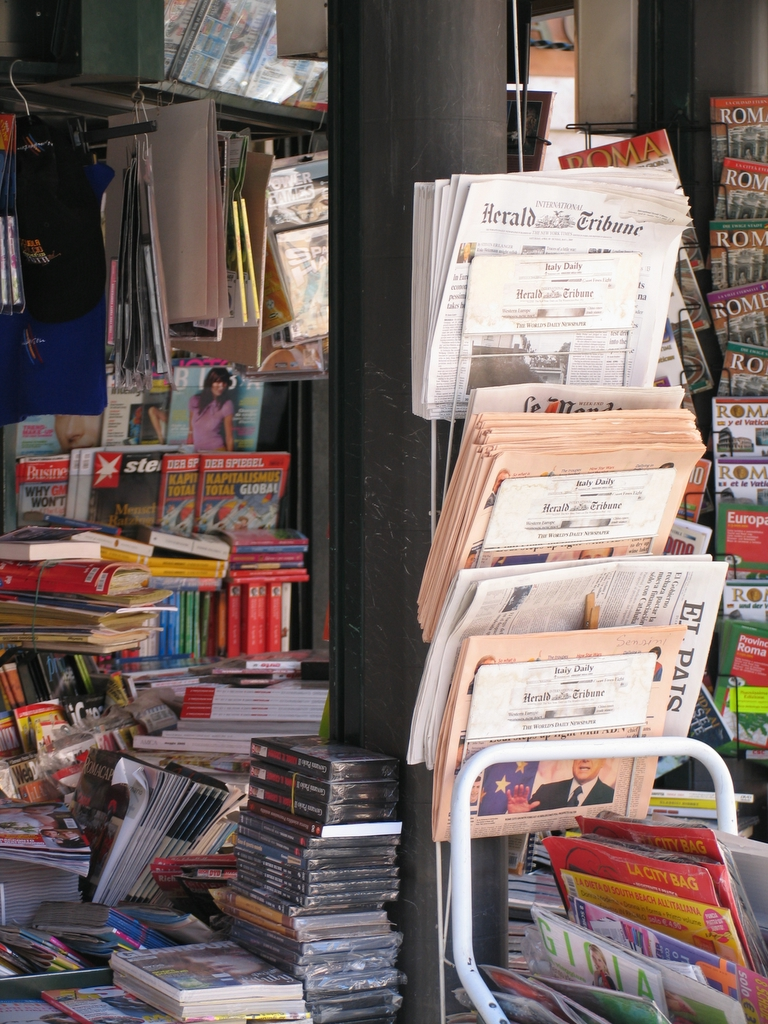
Newspapers on sale in Rome, Italy, May 2005

The decline of newspapers in the 21st century consists of the closure of many traditional newspapers and a decline in the number of professional journalists. Meanwhile, a small number of newspapers with significant brand recognition have seen a significant rise in viewership of their online publications.

In the U.S. and Europe, newspapers are facing declining advertisement sales, the loss of much classified advertising, and precipitous drops in circulation. The U.S. saw the loss of an average of two newspapers per week between late 2019 and May 2022, leaving an estimated 70 million people in places that are already news deserts and areas that are in high risk of becoming so. Prior to that steep decline, newspapers' weekday circulation had fallen 7% and Sunday circulation 4% in the United States, their greatest declines since 2010.

To survive, newspapers are considering combining and other options, although the outcome of such partnerships has been criticized.

The decline of newspapers has various adverse consequences, in particular at the local level. For example, research has linked closures of newspapers to declines in civic engagement of citizens, increases in government waste, and increases in political polarization. The decline of local news has also been linked to the increased nationalization of local elections.

== Causes ==
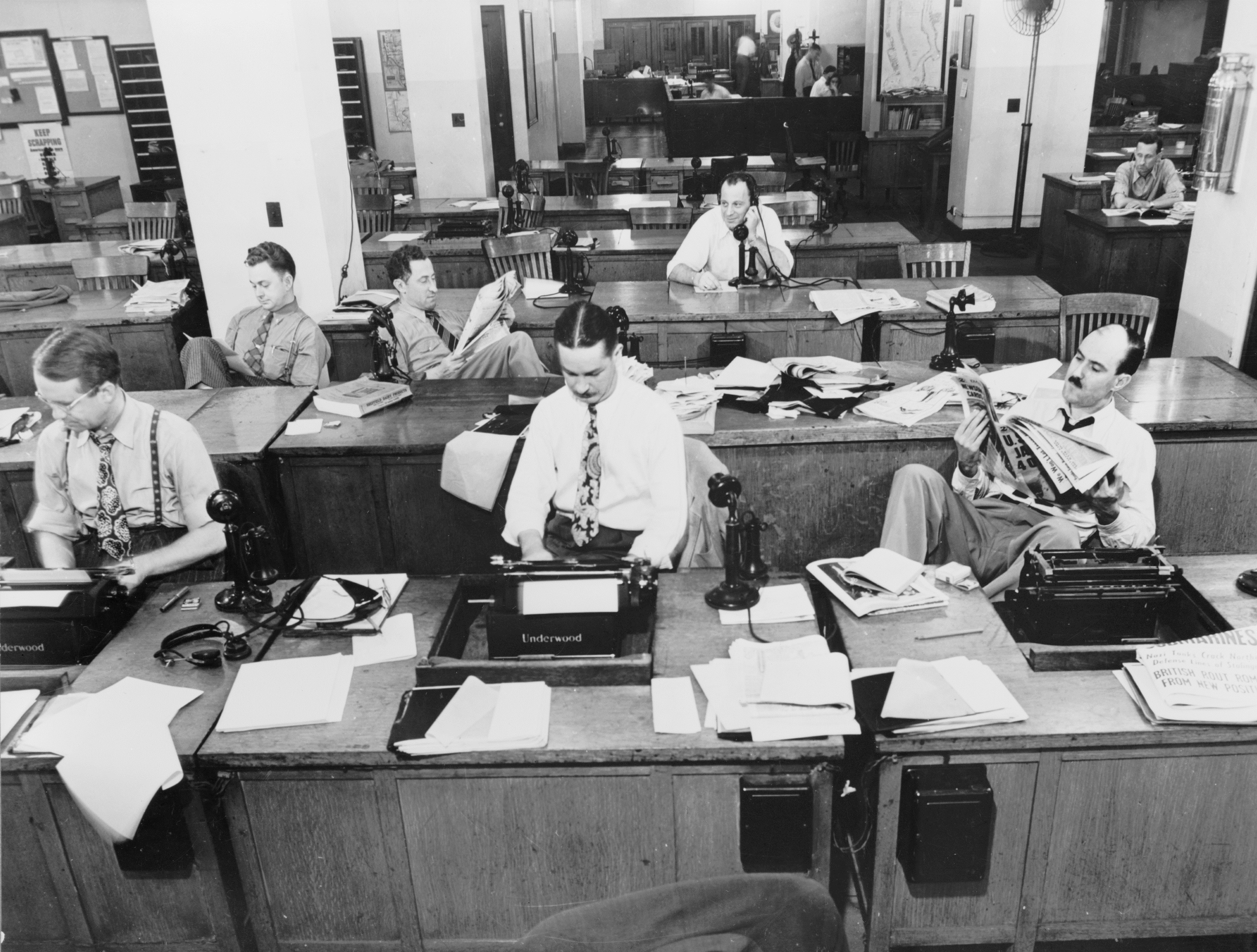
Newsroom of The New York Times, 1942

The newspaper industry has always been cyclical, and the industry has weathered previous troughs. Television's growth in the 1950s began the decline of newspapers as most people's source of daily news. But the explosion of the Internet in the 1990s increased the range of media choices available to the average reader while further cutting into newspapers' dominance as the source of news. Television and the Internet both bring news to the consumer faster and in a more visual style than newspapers, which are constrained by their physical format and their physical manufacturing and distribution. Competing mediums also offer advertisers moving images and sound. And the Internet search function allows advertisers to tailor their pitch to readers who have revealed what they are seeking—an enormous advantage.

The Internet has also gone a step further than television in eroding the advertising income of newspapers, as — unlike broadcast media—it provides a convenient vehicle for classified advertising, particularly in categories such as jobs, vehicles, and real estate. Free services like Craigslist have decimated the classified advertising departments of newspapers, some of which depended on classifieds for 70% of their ad revenue. Research has shown that Craigslist cost the newspaper industry $5.4 billion from 2000 to 2007, and that changes on the classified side of newspaper business led to an increase in subscription prices, a decrease in display advertising rates, and impacted the online strategy of some newspapers. At the same time, newspapers have been pinched by consolidation of large department stores, which once accounted for substantial advertising sums.

Conversely, political scientist Robert D. Putnam found in Bowling Alone (2000) that Americans who watched television news were more likely to read a daily newspaper rather than less, that network television news viewership in the 1990s was falling faster than newspaper circulation, that cable news channels and news websites were drawing upon a declining segment of the population that regularly followed the news rather than expanding its size, and that the decline of news readership and viewership was attributable instead to generational differences of interest in news between the Greatest Generation and Silent Generation versus Baby boomers and Generation X.

Press baron Rupert Murdoch once described the profits flowing from his stable of newspapers as "rivers of gold", but several years later said, "sometimes rivers dry up." "Simply put", wrote The Buffalo News owner Warren Buffett, "if cable and satellite broadcasting, as well as the Internet, had come along first, newspapers as we know them probably would never have existed."

As their revenues have been squeezed, newspapers have also been increasingly assailed by other media taking away not only their readers but their principal sources of profit. Many of these 'new media' are not saddled with expensive union contracts, printing presses, delivery fleets and overhead built over decades. Many of these competitors are simply 'aggregators' of news, often derived from print sources, but without print media's capital-intensive overhead. One estimate put the percentage of online news derived from newspapers at 80%.

"Newspapers are doing the reporting in this country," observed John S. Carroll, editor of the Los Angeles Times for five years. "Google and Yahoo! aren't those people putting reporters on the street in any number. Blogs cannot afford it." Many newspapers also suffer from the broad trend toward "fragmentation" of all media—in which small numbers of large media outlets attempting to serve substantial portions of the population are replaced by an abundance of smaller and more specialized organizations, often aiming only to serve specific interest groups. So-called narrowcasting has splintered audiences into smaller and smaller slivers. But newspapers have not been alone in this: the rise of cable television and satellite television at the expense of network television in countries such as the United States and United Kingdom is another example of this fragmentation.

With social media sites overtaking TV as a source for news for young people, news organisations have become increasingly reliant on social media platforms for generating traffic. A report by the Reuters Institute for the Study of Journalism described how a 'second wave of disruption' had hit news organisations, with publishers such as The Economist having to employ large social media teams to optimise their posts and maximise traffic.

== Performance in the market (2000–present) ==
=== United States ===
From 2005 to 2021, about 2,200 American local print newspapers closed. From 2008 to 2020, the number of American newspaper journalists fell by more than half.

Since the beginning of 2009, the United States has seen a number of major metropolitan dailies shuttered or drastically pruned after no buyers emerged, including the Rocky Mountain News, closed in February, and the Seattle Post-Intelligencer, reduced to a bare-bones Internet operation. The San Francisco Chronicle narrowly averted closure when employees made steep concessions. In Detroit, both newspapers, Detroit Free Press and The Detroit News, slashed home delivery to three days a week, while prodding readers to visit the newspapers' Internet sites on other days. In Tucson, Arizona, the state's oldest newspaper, the Tucson Citizen, said it would cease publishing on March 21, 2009, when parent Gannett Company failed to find a buyer.

A number of other large, financially troubled newspapers are seeking buyers. One of the few large dailies finding a buyer is The San Diego Union-Tribune, which agreed to be sold to a private equity firm for what The Wall Street Journal called "a rock-bottom price" of less than $50 million—essentially a real estate purchase. (The newspaper was estimated to have been worth roughly $1 billion as recently as 2004.) The Sun-Times Media Group, publisher of the eponymous bankrupt newspaper, fielded a meager $5 million cash bid, plus assumption of debt, for assets last claimed worth $310 million.

Large newspaper chains filing bankruptcy as of February 2009 include the Tribune Company, the Journal Register Company, the Minneapolis Star Tribune, Philadelphia Newspapers LLC, Sun-Times Media Group and Freedom Communications.

Some newspaper chains that have purchased other papers have seen stock values plummet. McClatchy, the nation's third-largest newspaper company, was the only bidder on the Knight Ridder chain of newspapers in 2005. Since its $6.5 billion Knight Ridder purchase, McClatchy's stock has lost more than 98% of its value. McClatchy subsequently announced large layoffs and executive pay cuts, as its shares fell into penny stock territory. (Although McClatchy faced delisting from the New York Stock Exchange for having a share price below $1, in September 2009, it was able to overcome this threat. Others have not been so lucky. In 2008 and 2009, three other U.S. newspaper chains saw their shares delisted by the New York Stock Exchange.)

Other newspaper company valuations have been similarly punished: the stocks of Gannett Company, Lee Enterprises and Media General traded at less than two dollars per share by March 2009, with The Washington Post Company's stock faring better than most, thanks to diversification into educational training programs — and away from publishing. Similarly, UK-based Pearson, owner of the Financial Times, increased earnings in 2008 despite a drop in newspaper profits, thanks to diversification away from publishing.

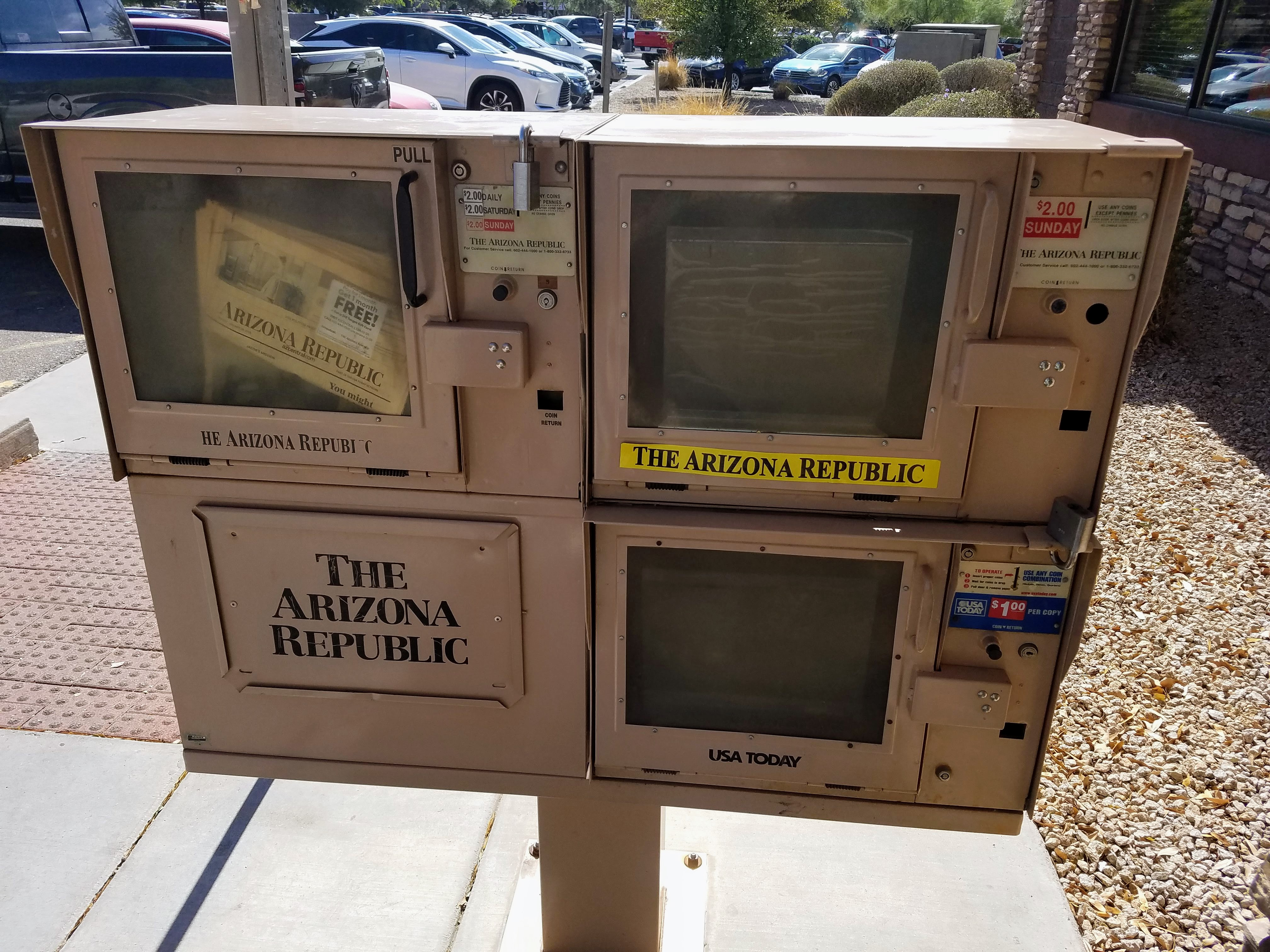
An abandoned newspaper box in Mesa, Arizona with a newspaper from 2018

By March 2018, it was acknowledged that the digital circulation for major newspapers was declining as well, leading to speculation that the entire newspaper industry in the United States was dying off. Circulation for once promising online news sites such as BuzzFeed, Vice, and Vox declined in 2017 and 2018 as well. In June 2018, a poll conducted by the Pew Research Center revealed a 9% decline in digital circulation of newspapers during the year 2017, suggesting that revenue from newspapers online could not offset the decline in print circulation.

The deterioration in the United States newspaper market led senator Ben Cardin to introduce a bill in March 2009 allowing newspaper companies to restructure as nonprofit corporations with an array of tax breaks. The Newspaper Revitalization Act would allow newspapers to operate as nonprofits similar to public broadcasting companies, barring them from making political endorsements.

A 2015 report from the Brookings Institution shows that the number of newspapers per hundred million population fell from 1,200 (in 1945) to 400 in 2014. Over that same period, circulation per capita declined from 35 percent in the mid-1940s to under 15 percent. The number of newspaper journalists has decreased from 43,000 in 1978 to 33,000 in 2015. Other traditional news media have also suffered. Since 1980, the television networks have lost half their audience for evening newscasts; the audience for radio news has shrunk by 40%.

=== United Kingdom ===
In the United Kingdom, newspaper publishers have been similarly hit. In late 2008, The Independent announced job cuts, and in 2016 The Independent's print edition ceased circulation. In January, the chain Associated Newspapers, now DMG Media, sold a controlling stake in the Evening Standard as it announced a 24% decline in 2008 ad revenues. In March 2009, parent company Daily Mail and General Trust said job cuts would be deeper than expected, spanning its newspapers, which include the Leicester Mercury, the Bristol Post and the Derby Telegraph. One industry report predicted that 1 in 10 UK print publications would cut its frequency of publication in half, go online only or shut in 2009.

A 2023 Department for Culture, Media and Sport committee report revealed that over 300 local newspaper titles closed between 2009 and 2019, and that those who remain are having to compete with fewer resources and journalists against online news providers. MP Damian Green said "With the shift towards online readership swallowing up traditional print revenues, many local newspapers which have served their communities for years have struggled to keep their heads above water".

In January 2024, Jim Mullen, the CEO of Reach plc who owns several national newspapers including the Daily Express and Daily Mirror as well as several local titles such as the Manchester Evening News warned that the print newspaper business could become loss-making within 5 years. On 19 September 2024, the Evening Standard printed its last daily edition, becoming a weekly only newspaper under the new name The London Standard as it had become unprofitable to continue daily printing, with an increase in working from home and access to wi-fi on the London Underground being cited as reasons for declining circulation.

=== Elsewhere ===
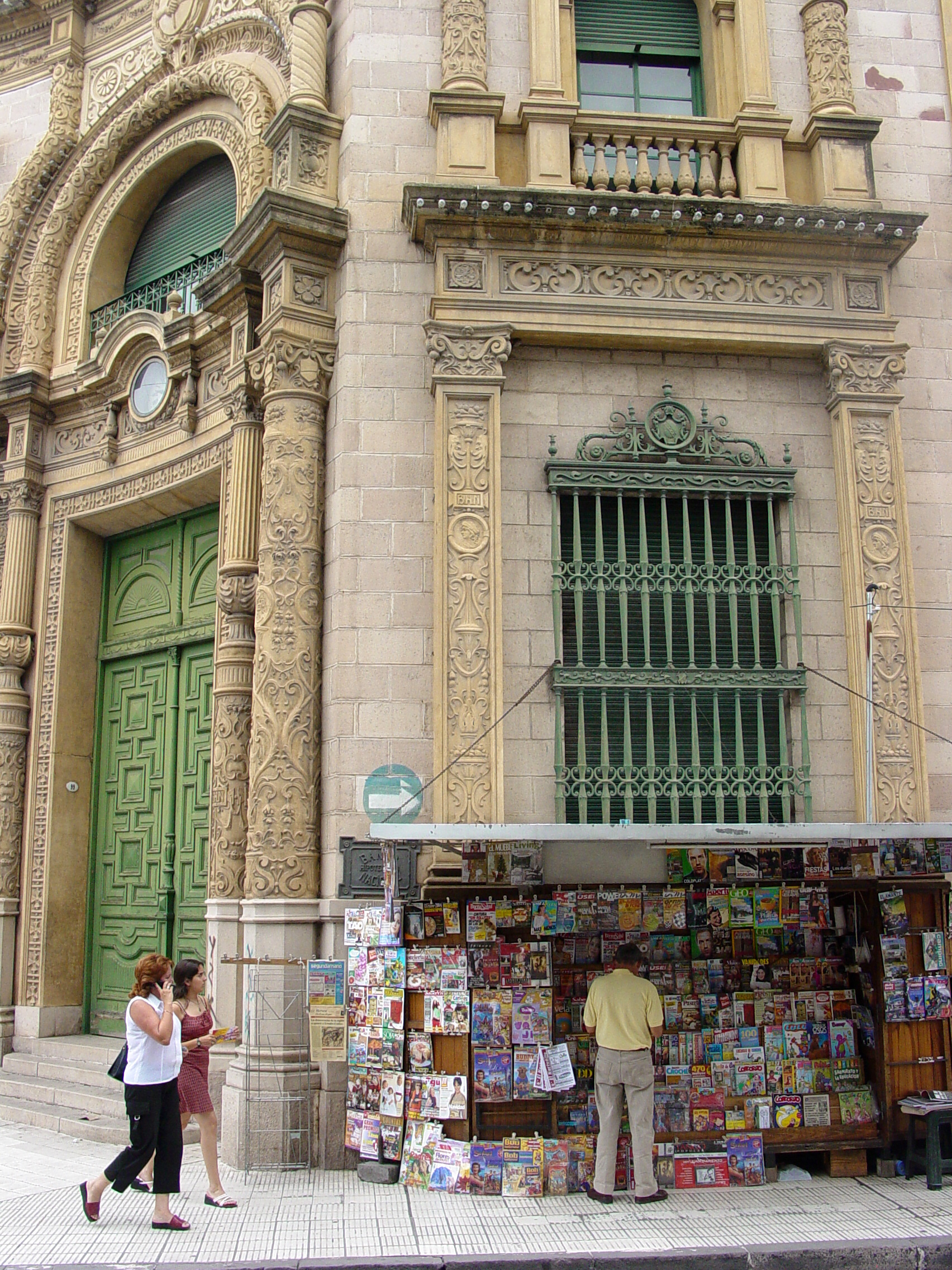
Newspaper market in Salta, Argentina, 2009

The challenges facing the industry are not limited to the United States, or even English-speaking markets. Newspapers in Switzerland and the Netherlands, for instance, have lost half of their classified advertising to the Internet. On 17 October 2025, German taz printed its last daily edition continuing as weekly wochentaz only.

At its annual convention in Barcelona, Spain, the World Association of Newspapers and News Publishers (WAN) titled the 2009 convention's subject "Newspapers Focus on Print & Advertising Revenues in Difficult Times".

In September 2008, WAN had called for regulators to block a proposed Google–Yahoo! advertising partnership, calling it a threat to newspaper industry revenues worldwide: "Perhaps never in the history of newspaper publishing has a single, commercial entity threatened to exert this much control over the destiny of the press," said the Paris-based global newspaper organization of the proposed search engine pact.

Of the world's 100 best-selling daily newspapers, 74 are published in Asia—with China, Japan and India accounting for 62 of those.

Sales of newspapers rose in Latin America, Asia and the Middle East, but fell in other regions of the world, including Western Europe, where the proliferation of free dailies helped bolster overall circulation figures. While Internet revenues are rising for the industry, the bulk of its Web revenues come from a few areas, with most revenue generated in the United States, western Europe and Asia-Pacific region.

== Technological and financial change ==
=== Technological change ===
Advertising revenue as a percent of US GDP shows a rise in audio-visual and digital advertising at the expense of print media.

The increasing use of the Internet search function, primarily through large engines such as Google, has also changed the habits of readers. Instead of perusing general interest publications, such as newspapers, readers are more likely to seek particular writers, blogs or sources of information through targeted searches, rendering the agglomeration of newspapers increasingly irrelevant. "Power is shifting to the individual journalist from the news outlet with more people seeking out names through search, e-mail, blogs and social media," the industry publication Editor & Publisher noted in summarizing a recent study from the Project for Excellence in Journalism foundation.

"When we go online", writes columnist Nicholas Kristof of The New York Times, "each of us is our own editor, our own gatekeeper."

Where once the ability to disseminate information was restricted to those with printing presses or broadcast mechanisms, the Internet has enabled thousands of individual commentators to communicate directly with others through blogs or instant message services. Even open journalism projects like Wikipedia have contributed to the reordering of the media landscape, as readers are no longer restricted to established print organs for information.

But the search engine experience has left some newspaper proprietors cold. "The aggregators and plagiarists will soon have to pay a price for the co-opting of our content," Rupert Murdoch told the World Media Summit in Beijing, China. "If we do not take advantage of the current movement toward paid content, it will be the content creators—the people in this hall—who will pay the ultimate price and the content kleptomaniacs who triumph."

Critics of the newspaper as a medium also argue that while today's newspapers may appear visually different from their predecessors a century ago, in many respects they have changed little and have failed to keep pace with changes in society. The technology revolution has meant that readers accustomed to waiting for a daily newspaper can now receive up-to-the-minute updates from Web portals, bloggers and new services such as Twitter. The expanding reach of broadband Internet access means such updates have become commonplace for many users, especially the more affluent, an audience cultivated by advertisers.

In some countries, such as India, the newspaper remains more popular than Internet and broadcast media. Even where the problems are felt most keenly, in North America and Europe, there have been recent success stories, such as the dramatic rise of free daily newspapers, like those of Sweden's Metro International, as well as papers targeted towards the Hispanic market, local weekly shoppers, and so-called hyperlocal news.

By 2016 social media sites were overtaking television as a source for news for young people and news organisations have become increasingly reliant on social media platforms for generating traffic. A report by Reuters Institute for the Study of Journalism described how a 'second wave of disruption' had hit news organisations, with publishers such as The Economist having to employ large social media teams to optimise their posts and maximise traffic. Major publishers such as Le Monde and Vogue increasingly use advanced artificial intelligence (AI) technology to post stories more effectively and generate higher volumes of traffic.

=== Revenue crisis ===
US Newspaper Advertising Revenue Newspaper Association of America published data

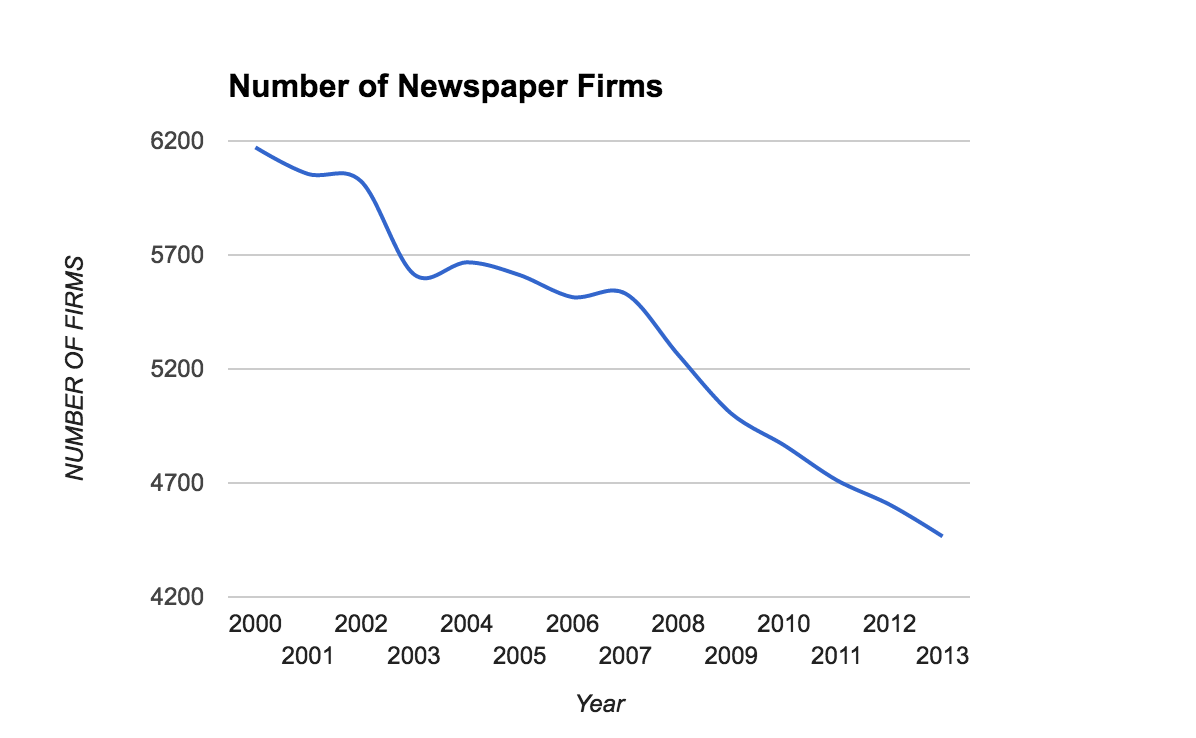
Number of newspapers in the United States

New revenue streams, such as that from newspapers' proprietary Web sites, are often a fraction of the sums generated by the previous advertisement- and circulation-driven revenue streams, and so newspapers have been forced to curtail their overhead while simultaneously trying to entice new users. With revenues plummeting, many newspapers have slashed news bureaus and journalists, while still attempting to publish compelling content—much of it more interactive, more lifestyle-driven and more celebrity-conscious.

In response to falling ad revenues and plunging circulation, many newspapers have cut staff as well as editorial content, and in a vicious cycle, those cuts often spur more and deeper circulation declines—triggering more loss of ad revenues. "No industry can cut its way to future success," says industry analyst John Morton. "At some point the business must improve."

Overall, in the United States, average operating profit margins for newspapers remain at 11%. But that figure is falling rapidly, and in many cases is inadequate to service the debt that some newspaper companies took on during better times. And while circulation has dropped 2% annually for years, that decline has accelerated.

The circulation decline, coupled with a 23% drop in 2008 newspaper ad revenues, have proven a double whammy for some newspaper chains. Combined with the current recession, the cloudy outlook for future profits has meant that many newspapers put on the block have been unable to find buyers, who remain concerned with increasing competition, dwindling profits and a business model that seems increasingly antiquated.

"As succeeding generations grow up with the Web and lose the habit of reading print", noted Columbia Journalism Review in 2007, "it seems improbable that newspapers can survive with a cost structure at least 50% higher than their nimbler and cheaper Internet competitors." The problem facing newspapers is generational: while in 2005 an estimated 70% of older Americans read a newspaper daily, fewer than 20% of younger Americans did.

The dilemmas facing the newspaper industry come as its product has never been more sought after. "The peculiar fact about the current crisis", writes The New Yorker's economics writer James Surowiecki, "is that even as big papers have become less profitable they've arguably become more popular."

As the demand for news has exploded, so have consumers of the output of newspapers. Both nytimes.com and washingtonpost.com, for instance, rank among the top 20 global news sites. But those consumers are now reading newspapers online for free, and although newspapers have been able to convert some of that viewership into ad dollars, it is a trickle compared to previous sources. At most newspapers, Web advertising accounts for only 10%–15% of revenues.

Some observers have compared the dilemma to that faced by the music industry. "What's going on in the news business is a lot like what's happening with music," said editor Paul Steiger, a 43-year journalism veteran, who further added that free distribution of content through the Internet has caused "a total collapse of the business model".

The revenue streams that newspapers counted on to subsidize their product have changed irrevocably: in 2008, according to a study by the Pew Research Center, more people in the United States got their news for free on the Internet than paid for it by buying a newspaper or magazine. "With newspapers entering bankruptcy even as their audience grows, the threat is not just to the companies that own them, but also the news itself," observed writer David Carr of The New York Times in a January 2009 column.

=== Financial strategies ===
While newspaper companies continue to produce much of the award-winning journalism, consumers of that journalism are less willing to pay for it in a world where information on the Web is plentiful and free. Plans for Web-based subscription services have largely faltered, with the exception of financial outlets like The Wall Street Journal, which have been able to generate substantial revenues from subscribers whose subscriptions are often underwritten by corporate employers. (Subscriptions to the Journal's paid Web site were up 7% in 2008.) Some general-interest newspapers, even high-profile papers like The New York Times, were forced to experiment with their initial paid Internet subscription models. Times Select, the Times' initial pay service, lasted exactly two years before the company abandoned it. However, they later brought back paid services and now allow visitors only 10 free articles per month before requiring them to purchase a subscription.

Within the industry, there is little consensus on the best strategy for survival. Some pin their hopes on new technologies such as e-paper or radical revisions of the newspaper, such as Daily Me; others, like a 2009 cover story in Time magazine, have advocated a system that includes both subscriptions as well as micro-payments for individual stories.

Some newspaper analysts believe the wisest move is embracing the Internet, and exploiting the considerable brand value and consumer trust that newspapers have built over decades. But revenues from online editions have come nowhere near matching previous print income from circulation and advertising sales, since they get only about one-tenth to one-twentieth the revenue for a Web reader that they do for a print reader; many struggle to maintain their previous levels of reporting amidst eroding profits.

With profits falling, many newspapers have cut back on their most expensive reporting projects—overseas bureaus and investigative journalism. Some investigative projects often take months, with their payoff uncertain. In the past, larger newspapers often devoted a portion of their editorial budget to such efforts, but with ad dollars drying up, many papers are looking closer at the productivity of individual reporters, and judging speculative investments in investigative reports as non-essential.

Some advocates have suggested that instead of investigative reports funded by newspapers, that non-profit foundations pick up the slack. The non-profit ProPublica, a $10-million-a-year foundation devoted solely to investigative reporting and overseen by former Wall Street Journal editor Paul Steiger, for instance, hopes that its 18 reporters will be able to release their investigative reports free, courtesy of partnerships with such outlets as The New York Times, The Atlantic and 60 Minutes. The online editor of the aforementioned Tucson Citizen founded an alternative, locally based nonprofit online newspaper, the Tucson Sentinel, in 2009 after the Citizen was shut down, and not long afterward joined what is now the Institute for Nonprofit News, a national organization of over 200 similar independent news providers. The Huffington Post also announced that it would set aside funds for investigative reporting. Other industry observers are now clamoring for government subsidies to the newspaper industry.

Observers point out that the reliability and accountability of newspapers is being replaced by a sea of anonymous bloggers, many with uncertain credentials and points of view. Where once the reader of a daily newspaper might consume reporting, for instance, by an established Cairo bureau chief for a major newspaper, today that same reader might be directed by a search engine to an anonymous blogger with cloudy allegiances, training or ability.

=== Outlook ===
In 2016, for the third year in a row, the CareerCast survey of the best and worst jobs in the U.S. reports that a newspaper reporter is the worst career. It pointed to fewer job prospects because of publications closing down, and declining ad revenue providing less money for salaries. Being an over the air broadcaster was the third worst, and advertising sales is in the bottom ten. Average annual salary for print journalists is $37,200.

The closure of local newspapers has created a phenomenon of news deserts. A June 2022 report estimates that approximately 70 million Americans live in a county with one or no local news organization.

Depending on location and circumstances, each specific newspaper faces varied threats and changes. In some cases, new owners have increased their reliance on print, not trying to rely a lot more on digital services. However, in most cases, there is an attempt to find new revenue sources online that are less based on print sales.

Several newspapers, including the Seattle Post-Intelligencer, The Christian Science Monitor, The Ann Arbor News, and the Austrian Wiener Zeitung have become Internet only. According to former CEO Olivier Fleurot of Financial Times, "The number of newspapers and their circulation has declined the world over except in India and China."

"My expectation," wrote executive editor Bill Keller of The New York Times in January 2009, "is that for the foreseeable future our business will continue to be a mix of print and online journalism, with the growth online offsetting the (gradual, we hope) decline of print". The paper in newspaper may go away, insist industry stalwarts, but the news will remain. "Paper is dying," said Nick Bilton, a technologist for The Times, "but it's just a device. Replacing it with pixels is a better experience." On September 8, 2010, Arthur Sulzberger Jr., chairman and Publisher of The New York Times, told an International Newsroom Summit in London that "We will stop printing the New York Times sometime in the future, date TBD."

New York University journalism professor Mitchell Stephens has called for a turn toward "wisdom journalism" that will take a more evaluative, investigative, informed, and possibly even opinionated stance.

"Journalistic outlets will discover", wrote Michael Hirschorn in The Atlantic, "that the Web allows (okay, forces) them to concentrate on developing expertise in a narrower set of issues and interests, while helping journalists from other places and publications find new audiences." The 'newspaper' of the future, say Hirschorn and others, may resemble The Huffington Post more than anything flung at today's stoops and driveways.

== Impact ==
=== Decline in political neutrality ===
The shift from news coverage in geographical regions to online markets likely contributed to increased political polarization in the 2000s and 2010s. Research has linked the closures of newspapers to declines in civic engagement of citizens, increases in government waste, and increases in political polarization. The decline of local news has also been linked to the increased "nationalization" of local elections. As citizens have fewer opportunities to read about local politics, they are attracted to national sources (such as cable news) and begin to interpret local politics via national politics.

=== Socio-economic consequences ===
Robert D. Putnam noted in Bowling Alone after analyzing data from the General Social Survey, the DDB Needham Life Style Surveys, and archives at the Roper Center for Public Opinion Research that when statistically controlling for age, educational attainment, connections to local communities, and other demographic characteristics, Americans who consistently read newspapers were more knowledgeable about current events, had higher membership and active participation rates in local civic associations, participated in volunteering activities and community projects and attended town meetings more frequently, had higher voter turnout rates, visited with friends more frequently, and trusted their neighbors more than Americans who only watched news on television.

Studies have found that declines in employment in the newspaper industry have led to a massive reduction in the amount of political coverage by newspapers. A study published in 2021 in PNAS found that the average share of news stories in local newspapers in the U.S. that were investigative had declined significantly beginning in 2018.

A study published in 2020 in Urban Affairs Review matched 11 local newspapers in California to the municipalities they cover and analyzed mayoral elections in those cities. The data demonstrated that newspapers with relatively sharp cuts in newsroom staff had, on average, significantly reduced political competition in campaigns for mayor. The research also found evidence suggesting that lower levels of newsroom staffing were associated with lower voter turnout. The study supported the hypothesis that "the loss of professional expertise in coverage of local government has negative consequences for the quality of city politics because citizens become less informed about local policies and elections."

== See also ==
- News desert, a community that is no longer covered by daily journalists
- Mass media and American politics
- Social media and political communication in the United States
- History of journalism
- History of American newspapers
- History of British newspapers
- History of Canadian newspapers
- History of French journalism
- Online newspaper
- Decline of television
