= L. J. Hanifan =

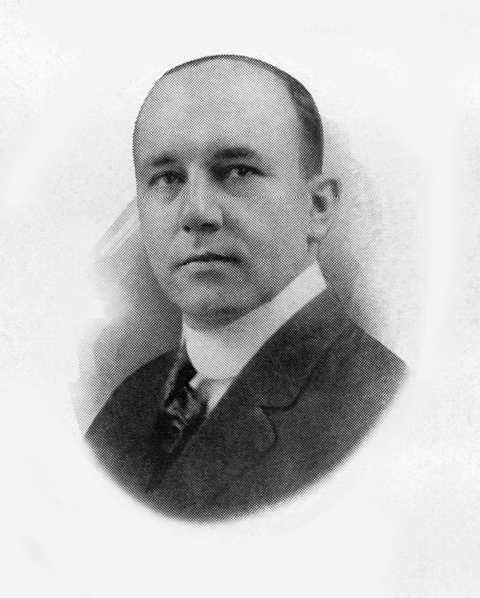
Lyda Judson Hanifan

Lyda Judson Hanifan (February 12, 1879 – December 11, 1932), better known as L. J. Hanifan, is credited with introducing the concept of social capital. Robert Putnam in his book, Bowling Alone (2000) credits a 1916 paper by Hanifan as the first recorded instance of the term. Hanifan also authored a book published in 1920 that contains a chapter entitled "Social Capital".

== Biography ==
Hanifan was born February 12, 1879, in the timbering camp of Cubana, West Virginia and went on to higher education at West Virginia Wesleyan College. He graduated from West Virginia University with a Bachelor of Arts degree on October 21, 1907, with no major listed. In the years following, he attended the University of Chicago and received a Master of Arts degree from Harvard University in 1909. He returned to West Virginia where he served school systems in Elkins, Belington, Charleston, and Welch, and for nearly 10 years was state supervisor of rural schools. Hanifan authored two books and a number of pamphlets on rural education.

According to Robert Putnam, "the first known use of the concept (of social capital) was not by some cloistered theoretician, but by a practical reformer of the Progressive Era—L. J. Hanifan, state supervisor of rural schools in West Virginia. Writing in 1916 to urge the importance of community involvement for successful schools, Hanifan invoked the idea of 'social capital' to explain why." "Hanifan's account of social capital," Putnam continues, "anticipated virtually all of the crucial elements in later interpretations, but his conceptual invention apparently attracted no notice from other social commentators and disappeared without a trace" for the next 84 years. Hanifan defined social capital as:

The tangible substances [that] count for most in the daily lives of people: namely good will, fellowship, sympathy, and social intercourse among the individuals and families who make up a social unit. . .. The individual is helpless socially, if left to himself. If he comes into contact with his neighbor, and they with other neighbors, there will be an accumulation of social capital, which may immediately satisfy his social needs and which may bear a social potentiality sufficient to the substantial improvement of living conditions in the whole community. The community as a whole will benefit by the cooperation of all its parts, while the individual will find in his associations the advantages of the help, the sympathy, and the fellowship of his neighbors.

In December 1917, State Superintendent of Free Schools H. P. Shawkey appointed Hanifan as secretary to the New School Code Commission. The commission developed key provisions of the public education system in West Virginia. The Commission report presented to the West Virginia Legislature in January, 1919, resulted in legislation adopted in February, 1920, establishing the state board of education, creating the 10-month school term, raising teacher's salaries, mandating compulsory attendance for pupils age 6–16, authorizing junior high schools, and among other provisions.

Hanifan married Mary Pearl Agee (1891–1948) on March 26, 1913, and they had one child, Mary Elkin Hanifan. His father was John Hanifan, married three times, his mother being Sara Taylor. Lyda had five full siblings, Lorenzo Dow, French W. and Stark W. (twins), Floyd R., and Luetta Hanifan. Also, ten half siblings. After serving as Superintendent of Schools in Welch, West Virginia, Hanifan moved to Paducah, Kentucky, where he served as Superintendent of Schools until his death.

== Works ==
The following are all of the currently known publications of L. J. Hanifan:

- Hanifan, L. J. (1912). "The Rural School and Rural Life". West Virginia School Journal (4): 204–7.
- Hanifan, L. J., Ed. (1913). District Supervision: West Virginia and Oregon as Examples. National Society for the Study of Education, Twelfth Yearbook. Chicago, University of Chicago Press.
- Hanifan, L. J. (1913). A Handbook Containing Suggestions and Programs for Community Social Gatherings at Rural School Houses Charleston, WV, State Department of Education.
- Hanifan, L. J. (1913). A Supplement to the State Manual of the Elementary Course of Study. Charleston, WV, Department of Free Schools.
- Hanifan, L. J. (1914). Facts and Fallacies About Consolidation of Schools in West Virginia. Charleston, WV, Department of Free Schools: 16.
- Hanifan, L. J. (1914). "Social Centers and Rural Schools." Atlantic Educational Journal 10: 62–65.
- Hanifan, L. J. (1916). Evening Classes for West Virginia Elementary Schools. Charleston, WV, Department of Free Schools.
- Hanifan, L. J. (1916). "The Rural School Community Center". Annals of the American Academy of Political and Social Science. 67: 130–138. doi:10.1177/000271621606700118. hdl:2027/uiug.30112072163055. S2CID 144587967.
- Hanifan, L. J. (1920). The Community Center. Boston: Silver, Burdett & Company.
- Hanifan, L. J. (1920). The Difficulties of Consolidation. The Consolidated Rural School. L. W. Rapeer. New York, Charles Scribner's Sons: 475–496.
