= Join or Die (disambiguation) =

Join or Die or Join, or Die may refer to:

- Join or Die, a 2023 American documentary film
- Join, or Die, a 1754 American political cartoon
- Join, or Die (album), by Amen, 2003
- Join or Die with Craig Ferguson, an American TV panel show
