= Join or Die =

2023 American documentary film

- Starring: Robert Putnam
- Release date: 2023
- Country: United States

Join or Die is a 2023 American documentary film regarding community connections and club participation, based on the work of political scientist Robert Putnam.

The film includes interviews with Hillary Clinton, Pete Buttigieg, Surgeon General Vivek Murthy, Eddie Glaude Jr., Raj Chetty, and Priya Parker.

Putnam's research into social capital were popularized by his 2000 book Bowling Alone.

== Reception ==
Join or Die has a 95% approval rating on Rotten Tomatoes, with an average rating of 7.2 out of 10 based on 20 reviews.
