= Two-level game theory =

Political model of international conflict resolution

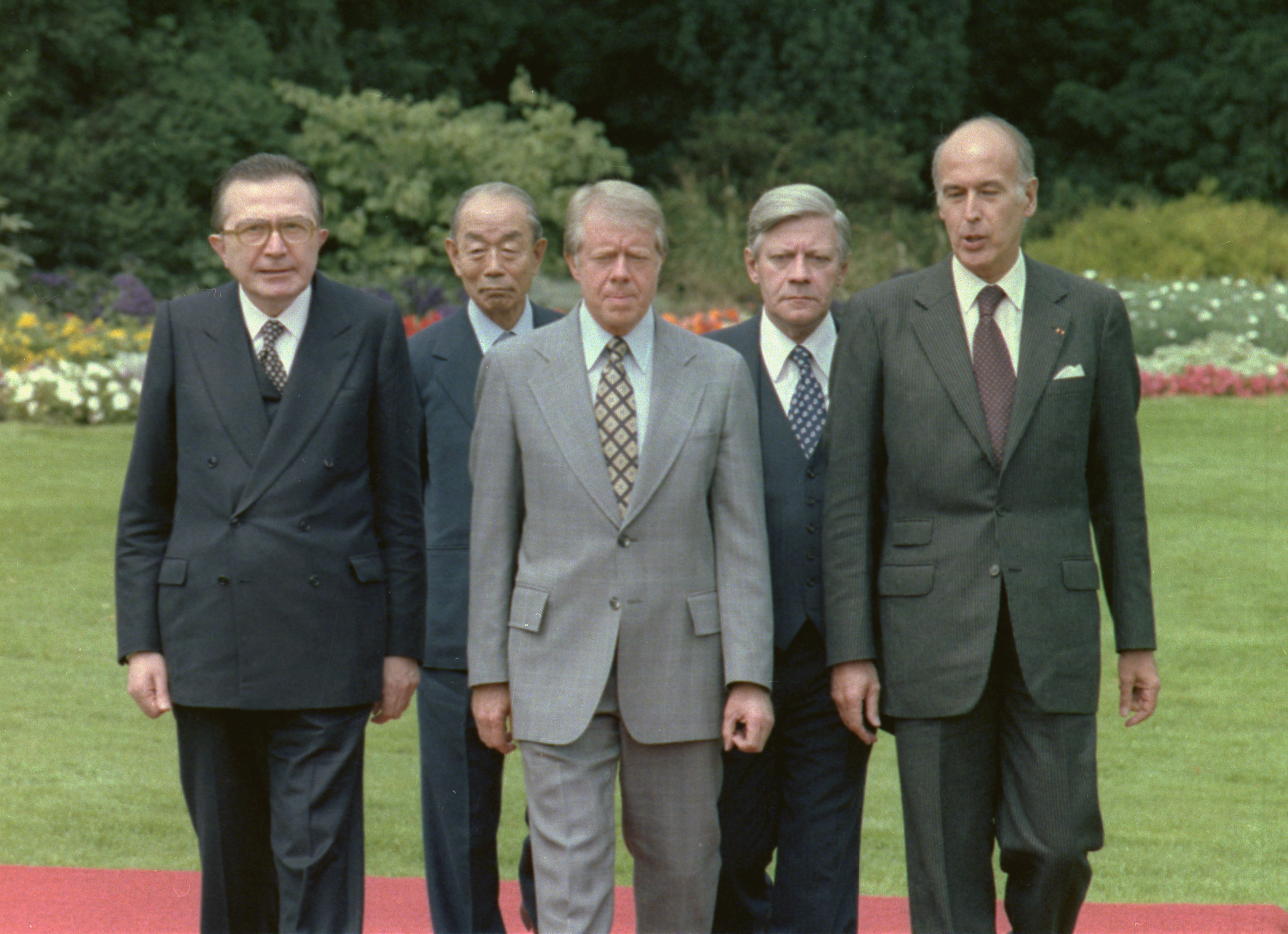
Five of the seven leaders at the 1978 G7 Economic Summit in Bonn. From left to right: Giulio Andreotti (Italy), Takeo Fukuda (福田 赳夫) (Japan), Jimmy Carter (USA), Helmut Schmidt (West Germany) and Valéry d'Estaing (France).

Two-level game theory is a political model, derived from game theory, that illustrates the domestic-international interactions between states. It was originally introduced in 1988 by Robert D. Putnam in his publication "Diplomacy and Domestic Politics: The Logic of Two-Level Games".

Putnam had been involved in research around the G7 summits between 1976 and 1979. However, at the fourth summit, held in Bonn in 1978, he observed a qualitative shift in how the negotiations worked. He noted that attending countries agreed to adopt policies in contrast to what they might have in the absence of their international counterparts. However, the agreement was only viable due to strong domestic influence - within each international government - in favour of implementing the agreement internationally. This culminated in international policy co-ordination as a result of the entanglement of international and domestic agendas.

== The Model ==
The model views international negotiations between states as consisting of simultaneous negotiations at two levels.

- Level 1: The international level (between governments), and
- Level 2: The intranational level (domestic).

At the international level, the national government (i.e., chief negotiator) seeks an agreement, with an opposing country, relating to topics of concern. At the domestic level, societal actors pressure the chief negotiator for favourable policies. The chief negotiator absorbs the concern of societal actors and builds coalitions with them. Simultaneously, the chief negotiator then seeks to maximise the domestic concerns, yet minimise the impact of any contrary views from the opposing country.

== Win-Sets ==
At the international level, countries will approach negotiations with a defined set of objectives. It is expected that chief negotiators of both states arrive at a range of outcomes where their objectives overlap. However, before committing to this, the chief negotiator must seek approval from domestic actors. This ratification can be in the form of both formal voting requirements or informal methods, such as public opinion polls. Due to a potential difference in domestic concerns, the full range of agreement outcomes at the international level may not necessarily be approved. As such, the possible agreement outcomes at the international level that are accepted by domestic interest groups is defined as a state's "win-set". International agreements only occur when there is an overlap between the win-sets of the states involved in the international negotiations.

Win-set size plays an important role in determining the success of negotiations at the international level. Naturally, the larger the win-set, the more likely the win-sets will overlap, potentially leading to successful negotiations. Conversely, negotiations are more likely to fail when opposing state's win-sets are smaller. The perceived win-set size, however, is just as important as the actual win-set size. If a state's win-set size is perceived to be large, the opposing state will, therefore, have greater bargaining power. Alternatively, if a state's win-set is perceived to be rather small, this can lead to them attaining an advantage in negotiations, whereby they can influence the opposing state to concede more in order for negotiations to be a success.

== Examples ==
=== Paris Agreement ===
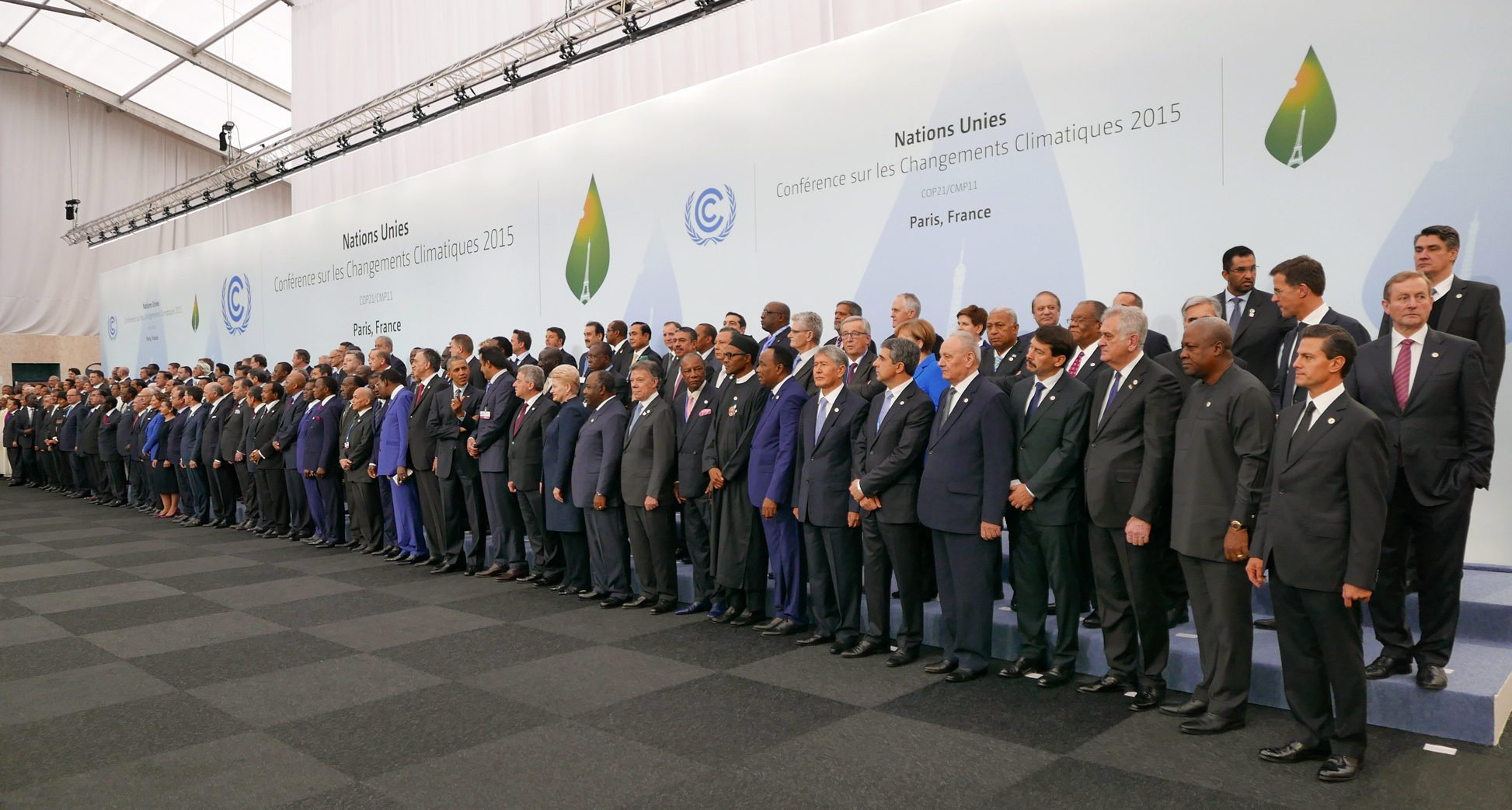
Heads of delegations at the 2015 United Nations Climate Change Conference (COP21), which led to the signing of the Paris Agreement.

In the context of climate change, all countries are negatively affected. But, when compared to the costs of steps taken to mitigate this, the majority of states benefit from the actions of a minority of large contributors. This lop-sided costs-to-benefits creates an incentive for some states to neglect their responsibilities and free-ride on the actions taken by others. As a classic case of the Prisoner's Dilemma, states are therefore more incentivised to do nothing, rather than contributing to mitigating climate change. This unequal burden-sharing has led to varying conceptions between states of what is fair under the Paris Agreement, resulting in both small and large countries utilising their negotiating assets to arrive at an agreement. However, as with any two-level game, domestic forces have influence on a state's win-set, which impacts the ability to negotiate an outcome at the international level. A recent example of this is the United States withdrawal from the Paris Agreement, which was supported by many Republicans as well as domestic interest groups aligned with the first Trump Administration.

=== Falklands War ===
In the period leading to the Falklands War, Anglo-Argentine negotiations resulted in several tentative agreements. The failure of domestic political forces to ratify these agreements meant the win-sets of the two countries did not overlap.
