= Better Together: Restoring the American Community =

2003 book

First edition (publ Simon & Schuster)

Better Together: Restoring the American Community is a book and website published in 2003 as an initiative of the Saguaro Seminar conducted at Harvard University's John F. Kennedy School of Government. The initiative is aimed at facilitating rapid and extensive community development, particularly within the United States and uses a book with the same title by Robert Putnam and Lewis M. Feldstein as its primary reference text.

== Saguaro Seminar ==
The Saguaro Seminar is a long-term research project aimed at significantly increasing Americans' connectedness to one another and to community institutions. Professor Putnam, also the author of Bowling Alone, leads the effort joined by Feldstein, other scholars, civic leaders, business people and politicians. The project's agenda includes building a knowledge base for understanding what creates and sustains civic trust, community participation and the bonds between people and their institutions. The seminar focuses on building social capital by conducting surveys and presenting initiatives for public engagement through the book and website.

The seminar's report, titled Better Together and issued in December 2000, called for a "nationwide campaign to redirect a downward spiral of civic apathy." The report warned that "social capital" in the US was dwindling to a critically low level and something needed to be done quickly to avoid civic catastrophe. The report further outlined a "framework for sustained, broad-based social change to restore America’s civic virtue" which culminated in both the book Better Together (ISBN 0-7432-3546-0) and the website BetterTogether.org.
