= Making Democracy Work =

1993 book by Robert Putnam

Making Democracy Work: Civic Traditions in Modern Italy
- Author: Robert D. Putnam
- Language: English
- Publisher: Princeton University Press
- Publication date: 1993
- Publication place: UK, US
- Media type: Print
- Pages: 247
- ISBN: 9780691037387

Making Democracy Work: Civic Traditions in Modern Italy (ISBN 9780691037387) is a 1993 book written by Robert D. Putnam (with Robert Leonardi and Raffaella Y. Nanetti). Published by Princeton University Press, the book's central thesis is that social capital is key to high institutional performance and the maintenance of democracy.

== Summary ==
The authors studied the performance of the twenty regional Italian governments since 1970, which were similar institutions but differed in their social, economic and cultural context. They found that regional government performed best, holding other factors constant, where there were strong traditions of civic engagement. The book has been cited thousands of times by other academics.

== Northern-Central Italy and Southern Italy ==
The work, also, evaluates the differences between Northern-Central Italy and Southern Italy. Around AD 1000 Northern Italy and Central Italy had a more active civil society, with many citizens taking part in politics and social gatherings in their communities. Northern-Central Italians had a mutual trust for their fellow citizen, governing horizontally. Politics was less hierarchical in their region. Southern Italy, however, was very different from its Northern-Central counterpart; a group of Norman Mercenaries created order in the area. The governing structure was much more vertical: the peasants were controlled by the knights and the knights were controlled by the kings. Northern and Central Italy created a democratic-type system for their citizens. Conversely, Southern Italy created a feudal and autocratic system of governing. Putnam concludes that these long-standing differences still help to explain north–south differences in governance, many centuries later.

== Author thesis ==
Putnam believes that for democracy to be successful there needs to be a level of mutual trust among the citizens and a more horizontal system of governing, all of which Northern and Central Italy has enjoyed. Putnam states in Making Democracy Work that civil society creates wealth, wealth does not create a civil society. The civic nature of Northern Italy and Central Italy dating back to medieval times has caused the region to be prosperous in modern times. Southern Italy, however, with its more feudal nature in medieval times has caused the region to be the origin of the Mafia and has created a less successful region. The Mafia's hierarchical structure is very similar to Southern Italy's feudal roots, according to Putnam. Putnam finds that the stark differences in medieval governing structures caused equally stark differences in the current political and economic atmosphere in both Southern and Northern-Central Italy.

== Reception ==
- Winner of the 1994 Charles H. Levine Memorial Book Prize
- Winner of the 1994 Gregory Luebbert Award
- Winner of the 1993 Louis Brownlow Book Award, National Academy of Public Administration
- Honorable Mention for the 1993 Award for Best Professional/Scholarly Book in Government and Political Science, Association of American Publishers

=== Editorial review ===
- Publishers Weekly:

"Harvard professor Putnam offers an in-depth examination of Italian politics and government."
