= Bowling Alone =

2000 nonfiction book by Robert Putnam

- Author: Robert D. Putnam
- Language: English
- Subject: Social science
- Publisher: Simon & Schuster
- Publication date: 2000
- Publication place: United States
- Media type: Print (hardback and paperback)
- Pages: 544
- ISBN: 978-0-7432-0304-3

Bowling Alone: The Collapse and Revival of American Community is a 2000 nonfiction book by Robert D. Putnam. It was developed from his 1995 essay entitled "Bowling Alone: America's Declining Social Capital" in the Journal of Democracy. Putnam surveys the decline of social capital in the United States since 1950. He has described the reduction in all the forms of in-person social intercourse upon which Americans used to found, educate, and enrich the fabric of their social lives. He argues that this undermines the active civic engagement which a strong democracy requires from its citizens.

== Contents ==
Putnam discussed ways in which Americans disengaged from community involvement, including decreased voter turnout, attendance at public meetings, service on committees, and work with political parties. Putnam also cited Americans' growing distrust in their government. Putnam accepted the possibility that this lack of trust could be attributed to "the long litany of political tragedies and scandals since the 1960s", but believed that this explanation was limited when viewing it alongside other "trends in civic engagement of a wider sort".

Putnam noted the aggregate loss in membership and number of volunteers in many existing civic organizations such as religious groups (Knights of Columbus, B'nai Brith, etc.), labor unions, parent–teacher associations, Federation of Women's Clubs, League of Women Voters, military veterans' organizations, volunteers with Boy Scouts and the Red Cross, and fraternal organizations (Lions Clubs, Benevolent and Protective Order of Elks, United States Junior Chamber, Freemasonry, Rotary, Kiwanis, etc.). Putnam used bowling as an example to illustrate this; although the number of people who bowled had increased in the last 20 years, the number of people who bowled in leagues had decreased. If people bowled alone, they did not participate in the social interaction and civic discussions that might occur in a league environment.

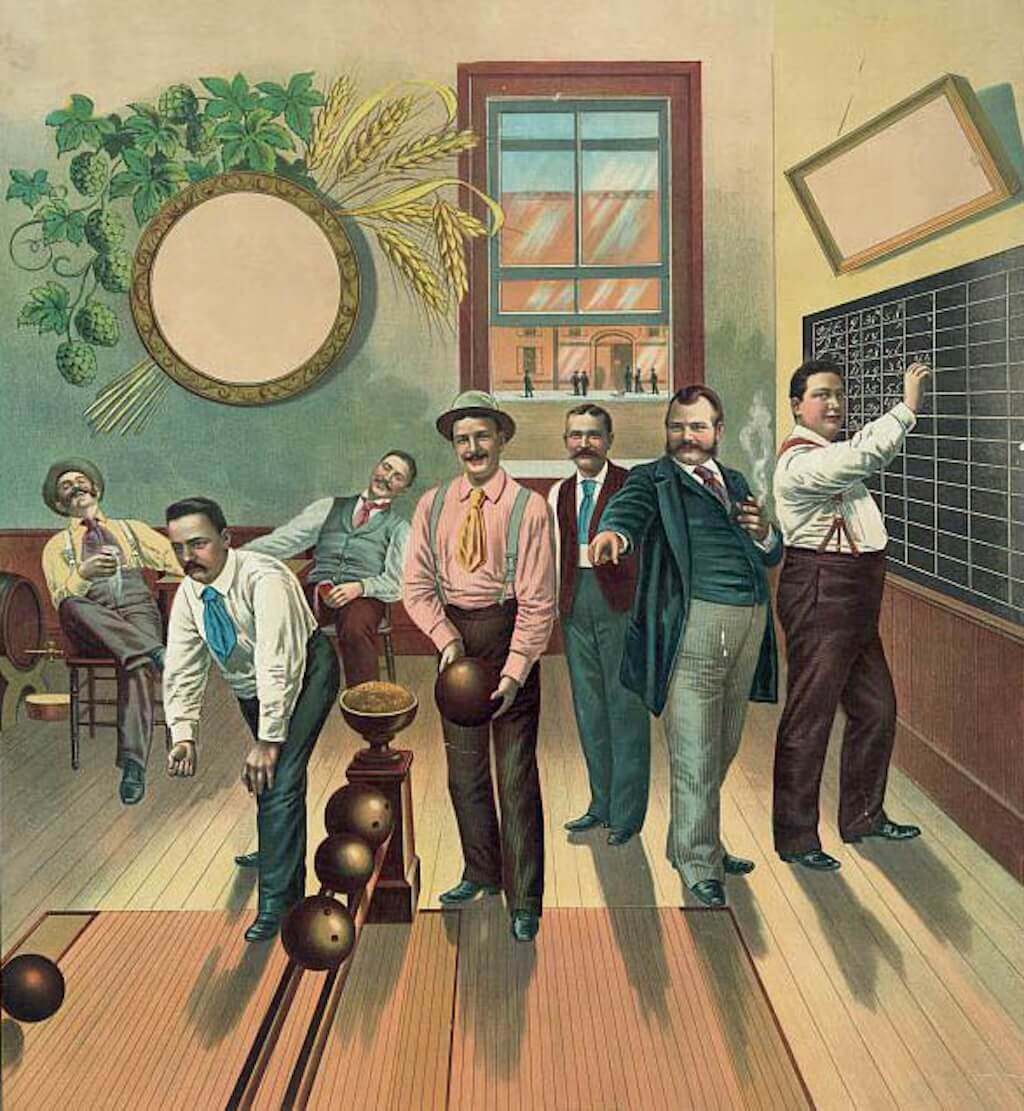
This 1894 depiction emphasizes the social nature of the sport.

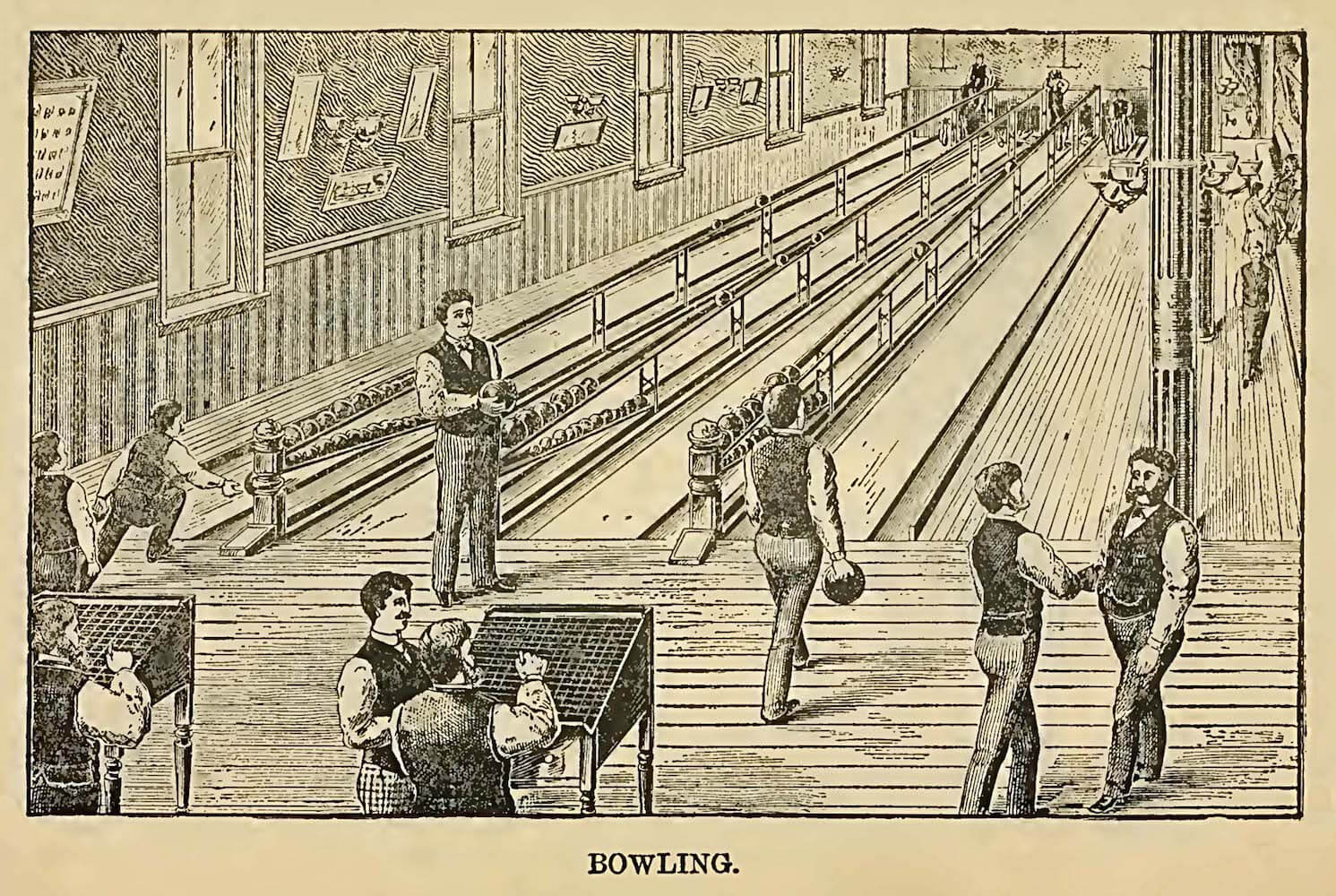
An 1892 portrayal of a bowling establishment in the Spalding Athletic Library reflects the sport's social aspect.

League participation peaked in the 1960s and 1970s. League bowling was used as a barometer of social capital in Bowling Alone (2000).

Putnam cites data from the General Social Survey that showed an aggregate decline in membership of traditional civic organizations, supporting his thesis that U.S. social capital had declined. He noted that some organizations had grown, such as the American Association of Retired Persons, the Sierra Club, and a plethora of mass-member activist groups. But he said that these groups did not tend to foster face-to-face interaction, and were the type where "the only act of membership consists in writing a check for dues or perhaps occasionally reading a newsletter." He also drew a distinction between two different types of social capital: a "bonding" type (which occurs within a demographic group) and a "bridging" type (which unites people from different groups).

He then asked: "Why is US social capital eroding?" and discussed several possible causes. He believed that the "movement of women into the workforce" and other demographic changes affected the number of individuals engaging in civic associations. He also discussed the "re-potting hypothesis"—that people become less engaged when they frequently move towns—but found that Americans actually moved towns less frequently than in previous decades. He did suggest that suburbanization, economics and time pressures had some effect, though he noted that average working hours had shortened. He concluded the main cause was technology "individualizing" people's leisure time via television and the Internet, suspecting that "virtual reality helmets" would carry this further in the future.

He estimated that the fall-off in civic engagement after 1965 was 10 percent due to pressure of work and double-career families, 10 percent to suburbanization, commuting, and urban sprawl, 25 percent to the expansion of electronic entertainment (especially television), and 50 percent to generational change (although he estimated that the effects of television and generational change overlapped by 10 to 15 percent). 15 to 20 percent remained unexplained.

Putnam suggested closer studies of which forms of associations could create the greatest social capital, and how various aspects of technology, changes in social equality, and public policy affect social capital. He closed by emphasizing the importance of discovering how the United States could reverse the trend of social capital decay.

== Reception ==
A review in Kirkus Reviews praised the book for being understandable for non-academic readers, and said that overall it was an "exhaustive and carefully argued study." The Economist called it "a prodigious achievement." C. S. Fischer, a sociology professor from the University of California, gave a positive review. Although he criticized a few of Putnam's interpretations of the data and felt that "social capital" was an awkward metaphor, he nevertheless called it "a 10-pin strike, a major contribution to study of social networks and social cohesion" with particular praise for its wide use of data.

Everett Carll Ladd claimed that Putnam completely ignored existing field studies, most notably the landmark sociological Middletown studies, which during the 1920s raised the same concerns he does today, except the technology being attacked as promoting isolation was radio instead of television and video games.

Other critics questioned Putnam's major finding, that civic participation has been declining. Journalist Nicholas Lemann proposed that rather than declining, civic activity in the US had assumed different forms. While bowling leagues and many other organizations had declined, others like youth soccer leagues had grown. He also points out that the thesis of Bowling Alone contradicts an implicit assumption of Putnam's previous book Making Democracy Work—that a tradition of civic engagement is incredibly durable over time.

In their 2017 book One Nation After Trump, Thomas E. Mann, Norm Ornstein and E. J. Dionne wrote that the decline of social and civic groups that Putnam documented was a factor in the election of Donald Trump as "many rallied to him out of a yearning for forms of community and solidarity that they sense have been lost."

In a 2024 interview, Putnam revisited the book, stating: "I think we’re in a really important turning point in American history. What I wrote in 'Bowling Alone' is even more relevant now. Because what we’ve seen over the last 25 years is a deepening and intensifying of that trend. We’ve become more socially isolated, and we can see it in every facet in our lives. We can see it in the surgeon general’s talk about loneliness. He’s been talking recently about the psychological state of being lonely. Social isolation leads to lots of bad things."

== Publication data ==
- Putnam, Robert D. (2000). Bowling Alone: The Collapse and Revival of American Community. New York: Simon & Schuster. ISBN 0-7432-0304-6.

== See also ==
- Community building
- DDB Needham Life Style Surveys
- Loneliness Epidemic
- Saguaro Seminar
- Society of the United States
- Third place
- Join or Die (film)
