= Social capital =

Networks of relationships among people who live and work in a particular society

Social capital is a concept used in sociology and economics to define networks of relationships which are productive towards advancing the goals of individuals and groups. It involves the effective functioning of social groups through interpersonal relationships, a shared sense of identity, a shared understanding, shared norms, shared values, trust, cooperation, and reciprocity.

Some have described social capital as the foundation of career networking and as an explanation for enhanced managerial performance, improved performance and growth of entrepreneurial firms, and the value derived from strategic alliances, such as supply chain relationships. It also contributes to the evolution of communities that work towards a common purpose, including the production of public goods.

== History ==
While it has been suggested that the term social capital was in intermittent use from about 1890, before becoming widely used in the late 1990s, the earliest credited use is by Lyda Hanifan in 1916 (see 20th century below).

The debate of community versus modernization of society and individualism has been the most discussed topic among the founders of sociology: such theorists as Tönnies (1887), Durkheim (1893), Simmel (1905), and Weber (1946) were convinced that industrialisation and urbanization were transforming social relationships in an irreversible way. They observed a breakdown of traditional bonds and the progressive development of anomie and alienation in society.

=== 18th–19th century ===
The power of community governance has been stressed by many philosophers from antiquity to the 18th century, from Aristotle to Thomas Aquinas, and Edmund Burke. This vision was strongly criticised at the end of the 18th century, with the development of the idea of Homo Economicus and subsequently with rational choice theory. Such a set of theories became dominant in the last centuries, but many thinkers questioned the complicated relationship between modern society and the importance of old institutions, in particular family and traditional communities.

The concept that underlies social capital has a much longer history; thinkers exploring the relation between associational life and democracy were using similar concepts regularly by the 19th century, drawing on the work of earlier writers such as James Madison (The Federalist Papers) and Alexis de Tocqueville (Democracy in America) to integrate concepts of social cohesion and connectedness into the pluralist tradition in American political science. John Dewey may have made the first direct mainstream use of social capital in The School and Society in 1899, though he did not offer a definition.

In the first half of the 19th century, de Tocqueville had observations about American life that seemed to outline and define social capital. He observed that Americans were prone to meeting at as many gatherings as possible to discuss all possible issues of state, economics, or the world that could be witnessed. The high levels of transparency caused greater participation from the people and thus allowed for democracy to work better.

=== 20th century ===
L. J. Hanifan's 1916 article regarding local support for rural schools is one of the first occurrences of the term social capital in reference to social cohesion and personal investment in the community. In defining the concept, Hanifan contrasts social capital with material goods by defining it as:

I do not refer to real estate, or to personal property or to cold cash, but rather to that in life which tends to make these tangible substances count for most in the daily lives of people, namely, goodwill, fellowship, mutual sympathy and social intercourse among a group of individuals and families who make up a social unit.… If he may come into contact with his neighbour, and they with other neighbours, there will be an accumulation of social capital, which may immediately satisfy his social needs and which may bear a social potentiality sufficient to the substantial improvement of living conditions in the whole community. The community as a whole will benefit by the cooperation of all its parts, while the individual will find in his associations the advantages of the help, the sympathy, and the fellowship of his neighbours.

Following the works of Tönnies (1887) and Weber (1946), reflection on social links in modern society continued with interesting contributions in the 1950s and in the 1960s. In particular, mass society theory – as developed by Daniel Bell (1962), Robert Nisbet (1969), Maurice R. Stein (1960), William H. Whyte (1956) – proposed themes similar to those of the founders, with a more pessimistic emphasis on the development of society. In the words of Stein (1960:1): "The price for maintaining a society that encourages cultural differentiation and experimentation is unquestionably the acceptance of a certain amount of disorganization on both the individual and social level."

Jane Jacobs used the term early in the 1960s. Although she did not explicitly define the term social capital, her usage referred to the value of networks. Political scientist Robert Salisbury advanced the term as a critical component of interest group formation in his 1969 article "An Exchange Theory of Interest Groups" in the Midwest Journal of Political Science.

Sociologist Pierre Bourdieu used the term in 1972 in his Outline of a Theory of Practice, and clarified the term some years later in contrast to cultural, economic, administrative capital, physical capital, political capital, social capital and symbolic capital. Sociologists James Coleman (1988), as well as Barry Wellman & Scot Wortley (1990), adopted Glenn Loury's 1977 definition in developing and popularising the concept. In the late 1990s, the concept gained popularity, serving as the focus of a World Bank research programme and the subject of several mainstream books, including Robert Putnam's Bowling Alone, and Putnam & Lewis Feldstein's Better Together.

All of these reflections contributed to the development of the social capital concept in the following decades. The appearance of the modern social capital conceptualization is a new way to look at this debate, keeping together the importance of community to build generalized trust and, at the same time, the importance of individual free choice, in order to create a more cohesive society. For this reason, social capital generated a great deal of interest in the academic and political world.

== Definitions and forms ==
Social capital has multiple definitions, interpretations, and uses. David Halpern argues that the popularity of social capital for policymakers is linked to the concept's duality, coming because "it has a hard nosed economic feel while restating the importance of the social." For researchers, the term is popular partly due to the broad range of outcomes it can explain; the multiplicity of uses for social capital has led to a multiplicity of definitions. Social capital involves networks of relationships based on trust that allows individuals and institutions to access resources needed.

Social capital has been used at various times to explain superior managerial performance, the growth of entrepreneurial firms, improved performance of functionally diverse groups, the value derived from strategic alliances, and enhanced supply-chain relations. "A resource that actors derive from specific social structures and then use to pursue their interests; it is created by changes in the relationship among actors" (Baker 1990, p. 619).

Early attempts to define social capital focused on the degree to which social capital serves as a resource – be it for public good or private benefit. Robert D. Putnam (1993) suggested that social capital would facilitate co-operation and mutually supportive relations in communities and nations and would therefore be a valuable means of combating many of the social disorders inherent in modern societies, for example crime. In contrast, others focus on the private benefits derived from the web of social relationships in which individual actors find themselves. This is reflected in Nan Lin's concept of social capital as "Investment in social relations with expected returns in the marketplace." This may subsume the concepts of some others such as Bourdieu, Flap and Eriksson. Newton (1997) treats social capital as a subjective phenomenon formed by values and attitudes that influence interactions. Nahapiet and Ghoshal (1998), in their examination of the role of social capital in the creation of intellectual capital, suggest that social capital should be considered in terms of three clusters: structural, relational, and cognitive.

=== Definitional issues ===
A number of scholars have raised concerns about the imprecision in defining social capital. Portes (2000), for example, notes that the term has become so widely used, including in mainstream media, that "the point is approaching at which social capital comes to be applied to so many events and in so many different contexts as to lose any distinct meaning." The term capital is used by analogy with other forms of economic capital, as social capital is argued to have similar (although less measurable) benefits. However, the analogy may be misleading in that, unlike financial forms of capital, social capital is not depleted by use; instead, it is depleted by non-use (use it or lose it). In this respect, it is similar to the economic concept of human capital.

Robison, Schmid, and Siles (2002) review various definitions of social capital and conclude that many do not satisfy the formal requirements of a definition. They assert that definitions must be of the form A=B, while many explanations of social capital describe what it can be used to achieve, where it resides, how it can be created, or what it can transform. In addition, they argue that many proposed definitions of social capital fail to satisfy the requirements of capital. They propose that social capital be defined as sympathy: the object of another's sympathy has social capital; those who have sympathy for others provide social capital. This proposition appears to follow Adam Smith, Theory of Moral Sentiments to some degree, but Smith's conceptualization of sympathy (particularly in the first two chapters of this work) appear more concerned with the roles of acceptance or congruence – in ethics or virtue – in evaluating an individual's 'propriety of action'.

Social capital is different from the economic theory of social capitalism, which challenges the idea that socialism and capitalism are mutually exclusive.

=== Forms of capital (Bourdieu) ===
In The Forms of Capital, Pierre Bourdieu distinguishes between three forms of capital: economic capital, cultural capital and social capital. He defines social capital as "the aggregate of the actual or potential resources which are linked to possession of a durable network of more or less institutionalized relationships of mutual acquaintance and recognition." His treatment of the concept is instrumental, focusing on the advantages to possessors of social capital and the "deliberate construction of sociability for the purpose of creating this resource." Quite contrary to Putnam's positive view of social capital, Bourdieu employs the concept to demonstrate a mechanism for the generational reproduction of inequality. Bourdieu thus points out that the wealthy and powerful use their "old boys network" or other social capital to maintain advantages for themselves, their social class, and their children.

=== Norms of trust and reciprocity (Sander, Putnam, Coleman) ===
Thomas Sander defines it as "the collective value of all social networks (who people know), and the inclinations that arise from these networks to do things for each other (norms of reciprocity)." Social capital, in this view, emphasizes "specific benefits that flow from the trust, reciprocity, information, and cooperation associated with social networks." It "creates value for the people who are connected, and for bystanders as well." Meanwhile, negative norms of reciprocity serve as disincentives for detrimental and violent behaviors.

James Coleman defined social capital functionally as "a variety of entities with two elements in common: they all consist of some aspect of social structure, and they facilitate certain actions of actors...within the structure" – that is, social capital is anything that facilitates individual or collective action, generated by networks of relationships, reciprocity, trust, and social norms. In Coleman's conception, social capital is a neutral resource that facilitates any manner of action, but whether society is better off as a result depends entirely on the individual uses to which it is put.

According to Robert D. Putnam, social capital refers to "connections among individuals – social networks and the norms of reciprocity and trustworthiness that arise from them." In the view of Putnam and his followers, social capital is a key component to building and maintaining democracy. Putnam says that social capital is declining in the United States. This is seen in lower levels of trust in government and lower levels of civic participation. Putnam also suggests that a root cause of the decline in social capital is women's entry into the workforce, which could correlate with time restraints that inhibit civic organizational involvement like parent-teacher associations. Technological transformation of leisure (e.g., television) is another cause of declining social capital, as stated by Putnam. This offered a reference point from which several studies assessed social capital measurements by how media is engaged strategically to build social capital.

=== Civic association (Fukuyama) ===
In "Social Capital, Civil Society, and Development", political economist Francis Fukuyama defines social capital as generally understood rules that enable people to cooperate such as the norm of reciprocity or religious doctrine like Christianity. Social capital is formed by repeated interactions over time and, he argues, is critical for development and difficult to generate through public policy. The importance of social capital for economic development is that these norms of behavior reduce transaction cost of exchange such as legal contracts and government regulations. Fukuyama suggests that while social capital is beneficial for development, it also imposes cost on non-group members with unintended consequences for general welfare.

Referencing Alexis de Tocqueville in Democracy in America, and what he described as the art of association of the American propensity for civil association, Fukuyama argues social capital is what produces a civil society. While civic engagement is an important part of democracy and development, Fukuyama states that, "one person's civic engagement is another's rent-seeking." Therefore, while social capital can facilitate economic development by reducing transaction cost and increasing productivity, social capital can also distort democracy if civic association enables special interest to gain special favors. However, Fukuyama argues despite the risk of society having too much social capital, it is nonetheless worse to have too little and be unable to organize for public goods and welfare enhancing activity.

=== Social ties ===
Carlos García Timón describes that the structural dimensions of social capital relate to an individual ability to make weak and strong ties to others within a system. This dimension focuses on the advantages derived from the configuration of an actor's, either individual or collective, network. The differences between weak and strong ties are explained by Granovetter (1973). Bridging the weak ties that individuals with heterogeneous limited interactions form. Bridging social capital is more likely to provide valuable new information (Moshkovitz and Hayat, 2021). Some others describes the weak and strong ties relationship as bonding and bridging social capital. Social capital refers to the networks of relationships among individuals that facilitate cooperation and enable societies to function more effectively. < https://brill.com/view/journals/ajss/37/3/article-p480_12.xmlThis is best characterized through trust of others and their cooperation and the identification an individual has within a network. Hazleton and Kennan (2000) added a third angle, that of communication. Communication is needed to access and use social capital through exchanging information, identifying problems and solutions, and managing conflict.

According to Boisot (1995), and Boland & Tenkasi (1995), meaningful communication requires at least some sharing context between the parties to such exchange. The cognitive dimension focuses on the shared meaning, representations and interpretations that individuals or groups have with one another.

== Negative social capital ==
Whereas some scholars, most prominently Robert D. Putnam, posit that social capital has positive ends, a sizable body of literature finds that social capital can have adverse effects. Research by Sheri Berman and Dylan Riley, as well as economists Shanker Satyanath, Nico Voigtländer, and Hans-Joachim Voth, have linked civic associations to the rise of fascist movements. Pierre Bourdieu's work tends to show how social capital can be used practically to produce or reproduce inequality, demonstrating for instance how people gain access to powerful positions through the direct and indirect employment of social connections.

An example of the complexities of the negative of effects social capital is violence or criminal gang activity that is encouraged through the strengthening of intra-group relationships (bonding social capital). The negative consequences of social capital are more often associated with bonding vis-à-vis bridging.

Without "bridging" social capital, "bonding" groups can become isolated and disenfranchised from the rest of society and, most importantly, from groups with which bridging must occur in order to denote an "increase" in social capital. Bonding social capital is a necessary antecedent for the development of the more powerful form of bridging social capital. Bonding and bridging social capital can work together productively if in balance, or they may work against each other. As social capital bonds and stronger homogeneous groups form, the likelihood of bridging social capital is attenuated. Bonding social capital can also perpetuate sentiments of a certain group, allowing for the bonding of certain individuals together upon a common radical ideal. The strengthening of insular ties can lead to a variety of effects such as ethnic marginalization or social isolation. In extreme cases ethnic cleansing may result if the relationship between different groups is so strongly negative. In mild cases, it isolates certain communities such as suburbs of cities because of the bonding social capital and the fact that people in these communities spend so much time away from places that build bridging social capital.

=== Accessibility ===
Edwards and Foley, as editors of a special edition of the American Behavioral Scientist on "Social Capital, Civil Society and Contemporary Democracy", raised two key issues in the study of social capital. First, social capital is not equally available to all, in much the same way that other forms of capital are differently available. Geographic and social isolation limit access to this resource. Second, not all social capital is created equally. The value of a specific source of social capital depends in no small part on the socio-economic position of the source with society.

On top of this, Portes (1998) has identified four negative consequences of social capital:

1. exclusion of outsiders;
2. excess claims on group members;
3. restrictions on individual freedom; and
4. downward levelling norms.

=== In political institutions ===
Social capital (in the institutional Robert Putnam sense) may also lead to bad outcomes if the political institution and democracy in a specific country is not strong enough and is therefore overpowered by the social capital groups. "Civil society and the collapse of the Weimar Republic" suggests that "it was weak political institutionalization rather than a weak civil society that was Germany's main problem during the Wihelmine and Weimar eras." Because the political institutions were so weak people looked to other outlets. "Germans threw themselves into their clubs, voluntary associations, and professional organizations out of frustration with the failures of the national government and political parties, thereby helping to undermine the Weimar Republic and facilitate Hitler's rise to power." In this article about the fall of the Weimar Republic, the author makes the claim that Hitler rose to power so quickly because he was able to mobilize the groups towards one common goal. Even though German society was, at the time, a "joining" society these groups were fragmented and their members did not use the skills they learned in their club associations to better their society, but to encourage their values across all cultures to provide a better society for people. They were very introverted in the Weimar Republic. Hitler was able to capitalize on this by uniting these highly bonded groups under the common cause of bringing Germany to the top of world politics. The former world order had been destroyed during World War I, and Hitler believed that Germany had the right and the will to become a dominant global power.

Additionally, in his essay "A Criticism of Putnam's Theory of Social Capital", Michael Shindler expands upon Berman's argument that Weimar social clubs and similar associations in countries that did not develop democracy, were organized in such a way that they fostered a "we" instead of an "I" mentality among their members, by arguing that groups which possess cultures that stress solidarity over individuality, even ones that are "horizontally" structured and which were also common to pre-Soviet Eastern Europe, will not engender democracy if they are politically aligned with non-democratic ideologies.

=== In race and ethnicity ===
Using a network-based conception for characterizing the social capital of collectivities (such as organizations or business clusters), Lester, Maheshwari, and McLain (2013) note that negative social capital may be the cause for disadvantageous differences among minority firms versus majority firms. While studying norms among African-American family firms and Euro-American family firms, Lester et al. noted that negative social capital was created when the owner of the company was pressured to engage in social behavior not conducive to firm profits.

Robert Putnam, in his later work, also suggests that social capital, and the associated growth of public trust are inhibited by immigration and rising racial diversity in communities. Putnam's study regarding the issue argued that in American areas with a lack of homogeneity, some individuals neither participated in bonding nor bridging social capital. In societies where immigration is high (US) or where ethnic heterogeneity is high (Eastern Europe), it was found that citizens lacked in both kinds of social capital and were overall far less trusting of others than members of homogenous communities were found to be. Lack of homogeneity led to people withdrawing from even their closest groups and relationships, creating an atomized society as opposed to a cohesive community. These findings challenge previous beliefs that exposure to diversity strengthens social capital, either through bridging social gaps between ethnicities or strengthening in-group bonds. It is very important for policy makers to monitor the level of perceived socio-economic threat from immigrants because negative attitudes towards immigrants make integration difficult and affect social capital.

Varshney (2001) studied the correlation between the presence of interethnic networks (bridging) versus intra-ethnic ones (bonding) on ethnic violence in India. He argues that interethnic networks are agents of peace because they build bridges and manage tensions, by noting that if communities are organized only along intra-ethnic lines and the interconnections with other communities are very weak or even nonexistent, then ethnic violence is quite likely. Three main implications of intercommunal ties explain their worth:

1. Facilitate communication in the community across ethnic lines
2. Squelch false rumors
3. Help the administration carry out its job and in particular peace, security and justice

This is a useful distinction; nevertheless, its implication on social capital can only be accepted if one espouses the functionalist understanding of the latter concept. Indeed, it can be argued that interethnic, as well as intra-ethnic networks can serve various purposes, either increasing or diminishing social capital. In fact, Varshney himself notes that intra-ethnic policing (equivalent to the "self-policing" mechanism proposed by Fearon and Laitin, 1996) may lead to the same result as interethnic engagement.

=== Social inequality ===
James Coleman (1988) has indicated that social capital eventually led to the creation of human capital for the future generation. Human capital, a private resource, could be accessed through what the previous generation accumulated through social capital. John Field (2003) suggested that such a process could lead to the very inequality social capital attempts to resolve. While Coleman viewed social capital as a relatively neutral resource, he did not deny the class reproduction that could result from accessing such capital, given that individuals worked toward their own benefit.

Even though Coleman never truly addresses Pierre Bourdieu in his discussion, this coincides with Bourdieu's argument set forth in Reproduction in Education, Society and Culture. Bourdieu and Coleman were fundamentally different at the theoretical level (as Bourdieu believed the actions of individuals were rarely ever conscious, but more so only a result of their habitus being enacted within a particular field, but this realization by both seems to undeniably connect their understanding of the more latent aspects of social capital.

According to Bourdieu, habitus refers to the social context within which a social actor is socialized. Thus, it is the social platform, itself, that equips one with the social reality they become accustomed to. Out of habitus comes field, the manner in which one integrates and displays their habitus. To this end, it is the social exchange and interaction between two or more social actors. To illustrate this, we assume that an individual wishes to better his place in society. He therefore accumulates social capital by involving himself in a social network, adhering to the norms of that group, allowing him to later access the resources (e.g. social relationships) gained over time. If, in the case of education, he uses these resources to better his educational outcomes, thereby enabling him to become socially mobile, he effectively has worked to reiterate and reproduce the stratification of society, as social capital has done little to alleviate the system as a whole. This may be one negative aspect of social capital, but seems to be an inevitable one in and of itself, as are all forms of capital.

== Positive consequences of social capital ==
Compared to Bourdieu, Robert D. Putnam has used the concept in a much more positive light: though he was at first careful to argue that social capital was a neutral term, stating "whether or not [the] shared are praiseworthy is, of course, entirely another matter," his work on American society tends to frame social capital as a producer of "civic engagement" and also a broad societal measure of communal health. He also transforms social capital from a resource possessed by individuals to an attribute of collectives, focusing on norms and trust as producers of social capital to the exclusion of networks.

Mahyar Arefi (2003) identifies consensus-building as a direct positive indicator of social capital. Consensus implies "shared interest" and agreement among various actors and stakeholders to induce collective action. Collective action is thus an indicator of increased social capital.

== Subtypes ==
=== Bonding, bridging, linking ===
Bowling league participation peaked in the 1960s and 1970s. League bowling was used as a barometer of social capital in Robert D. Putnam's Bowling Alone (2000).

In Bowling Alone: The Collapse and Revival of American Community (2000), Harvard political scientist Robert D. Putnam writes:

Henry Ward Beecher's advice a century ago to 'multiply picnics' is not entirely ridiculous today. We should do this, ironically, not because it will be good for America – though it will be – but because it will be good for us.

Putnam speaks of two main components of the concept, the creation of which Putnam credits to Ross Gittell and Avis Vidal:

1. Bonding social capital: the value assigned to social networks between homogeneous groups of people.
2. Bridging social capital: the value assigned to social networks between socially heterogeneous groups.

Typical examples are that criminal gangs create bonding social capital, while choirs and bowling clubs (hence the title, as Putnam lamented their decline) create bridging social capital. The distinction is useful in highlighting how social capital may not always be beneficial for society as a whole (though it is always an asset for those individuals and groups involved). Horizontal networks of individual citizens and groups that enhance community productivity and cohesion are said to be positive social capital assets whereas self-serving exclusive gangs and hierarchical patronage systems that operate at cross purposes to societal interests can be thought of as negative social capital burdens on society.

Similar to Putnam, Daniel P. Aldrich describes three mechanisms of social capital:

1. Bonding capital: the relationships a person has with friends and family, making it also the strongest form of social capital.
2. Bridging capital: the relationship between friends of friends, making its strength secondary to bonding capital.
3. Linking capital: the relationship between a person and a government official or other elected leader.

Aldrich also applies the ideas of social capital to the fundamental principles of disaster recovery, and discusses factors that either aid or impede recovery, such as extent of damage, population density, quality of government and aid. In his book Building Resilience: Social Capital in Post-Disaster Recovery, he primarily examines Japanese recovery following the 2011 Fukushima nuclear meltdown.

Social capital development on the internet via social networking websites such as Facebook or Myspace tends to be bridging capital according to one study, though "virtual" social capital is a new area of research.

=== Consummatory, instrumental ===
There are two other sub-sources of social capital:

1. Consummatory capital: a behavior that is made up of actions that fulfill a basis of doing what is inherent.
  - Examples include value interjection and solidarity.
2. Instrumental capital: behavior that is taught through ones surroundings over time.

==== Consummatory capital ====
Consummatory capital a behavior that is made up of actions that fulfill a basis of doing what is inherent. Two examples of consummatory social capital are value interjection and solidarity.

Value interjection: refers to the behavior of individuals or groups adhering to societal norms by meeting expected obligations, such as following established rules, timely bill payments, and punctuality. Diligent adherence contributes personal advantages like financial stability and improved relationships, as well as broader societal gains, including enhanced market confidence and perceived reliability.

Coleman goes on to say that when people live in this way and benefit from this type of social capital, individuals in the society are able to rest assured that their belongings and family will be safe. This understanding of solidarity may be traced to 19th century socialist thinkers, whose main focus was the urban working class of the Industrial Revolution. They analyzed the reasons these workers supported each other for the benefit of the group and held that this support was an adaptation to the immediate social environment, as opposed to a trait that had been taught to the workers in their youth. As another example, Coleman states that possessing this type of social capital individuals to stand up for what they believe in, and even die for it, in the face of adversity.

While the notion of solidarity as social capital is sometimes attributed to Karl Marx, in particular, the term social capital had a quite different meaning for Marx. All forms of "capital" were, for Marx, possessed only by capitalists and he emphasized the basis of labour in capitalist society, as a class constituted by individuals obliged to sell their labour power, because they lacked sufficient capital, in any sense of the word, to do otherwise. Marx saw "social capital" as a theoretical total amount of capital, purely in the sense of accumulated wealth or property, that existed in a particular society. He thereby contrasted it with specific and discrete "individual capital."

==== Instrumental capital ====
Instrumental capital is behavior that is taught through one's surroundings over time. Individuals donating their resources are not seeking direct repayment from the recipient, but motivated by membership in the same social structure. Donors might not see a direct repayment, but, most commonly, they will be held by the society in greater honor.

Portes mentions the donation of a scholarship to a member of the same ethnic group as an example of this. The donor is not giving up resources to be directly repaid by the recipient, but, as stated above, the honor of the community. With this in mind, recipients might not know the benefactor personally, but prospers as a member of the same social group.

Social capital is also linked with religious communities. Religion represents an important aspect of social capital (religious social capital). However, Putnam found that membership in secular organizations in the United States had a greater association with volunteering, blood donations, charity, and philanthropy than membership in religious organizations, that membership in secular organizations was associated with participation in community projects while membership in religious organizations was not, and that the difference was mostly attributable due to community and organizational involvement by religious fundamentalists being confined to activities within their congregations rather than the wider communities in which the congregations are located.

== Measurement ==
There is no widely held consensus on how to measure social capital, which has become a debate in itself. While usually one can intuitively sense the level/amount of social capital present in a given relationship (regardless of type or scale), quantitative measuring has proven somewhat complicated, resulting in different metrics for different functions.

Sociologists Carl L. Bankston and Min Zhou have argued that one of the reasons social capital is so difficult to measure is that it is neither an individual-level nor a group-level phenomenon, but one that emerges across levels of analysis as individuals participate in groups. They argue that the metaphor of "capital" may be misleading because, unlike financial capital, which is a resource held by an individual, the benefits of forms of social organization are not held by actors, but are results of the participation of actors in advantageously organized groups.

=== Name generators ===
One type of quantitative social capital measure uses name generators to construct social networks and to measure the level of social capital. These networks are constructed by asking participants to name people that they interact with, such as "Name all the people you've discussed important matters with in the past six months." Name generators are often useful to construct core discussion networks of close ties, rather than weaker ties.

=== Social capital scales ===
Many studies measure social capital by asking the question: "do you trust the others?" Other researches analyse the participation in voluntary associations or civic activities.

To expand upon the methodological potential of measuring online and offline social bonding, as it relates to social capital, Williams (2006), offers a matrix of social capital measures that distinguishes social bridging as a form of less emotionally-tethered relationships compared to bonding. Bonding and bridging sub-scales are proposed, which have been adopted by over 300 scholarly articles.

Lin, Peng, Kim, Kim & LaRose (2012) offer a noteworthy application of the scale by measuring international residents originating from locations outside of the United States. The study found that social media platforms like Facebook provide an opportunity for increased social capital, but mostly for extroverts. However, less introverted social media users could engage social media and build social capital by connecting with Americans before arriving and then maintaining old relationships from home upon arriving to the states. The ultimate outcome of the study indicates that social capital is measurable and is a concept that may be operationalized to understand strategies for coping with cross-cultural immersion through online engagement.

=== Cohesion measures ===
The level of cohesion of a group also affects its social capital and vice versa. However, there is no one quantitative way of determining the level of cohesiveness, but rather a collection of social network models that researchers have used over the decades to operationalize social capital. One of the dominant methods is Ronald Burt's constraint measure, which taps into the role of tie strength and group cohesion. Another network-based model is network transitivity.

=== Economic measures ===
Knack and Keefer (1996) measured econometric correlations between confidence and civic cooperation norms, with economic growth in a large group of countries. They found that confidence and civic cooperation have a great impact in economic growth, and that in less polarized societies in terms of inequality and ethnic differences, social capital is bigger.

Narayan and Pritchet (1997) researched the associativity degree and economic performance in rural homes of Tanzania. They observed that even in high poverty indexes, families with higher levels of incomes had more participation in collective organizations. The social capital they accumulated because of this participation had individual benefits for them, and created collective benefits through different routes, for example: their agricultural practices were better than those of the families without participation (they had more information about agrochemicals, fertilizers and seeds); they had more information about the market; they were prepared to take more risks, because being part of a social network made them feel more protected; they had an influence on the improvement of public services, showing a bigger level of participation in schools; they cooperated more in the municipality level.

=== Group membership-based ===
In measuring political social capital, it is common to take the sum of society's membership of its groups. Groups with higher membership (such as political parties) contribute more to the amount of capital than groups with lower membership, although many groups with low membership (such as communities) still add up to be significant. While it may seem that this is limited by population, this need not be the case as people join multiple groups. In a study done by Yankee City, a community of 17,000 people was found to have over 22,000 different groups.

How a group relates to the rest of society also affects social capital, but in a different manner. Strong internal ties can in some cases weaken the group's perceived capital in the eyes of the general public, as in cases where the group is geared towards crime, distrust, intolerance, violence or hatred towards others. The Ku Klux Klan is an example of this kind of organizations.

=== Social behaviour-based ===
Foschi and Lauriola have presented a measure of sociability as a proxy of social capital. The authors demonstrated that facets of sociability can mediate between general personality traits and measures of civic involvement and political participation, as predictors of social capital, in a holistic model of political behavior.

The World Social Capital Monitor is an instrument for measuring social goods and social capital created by the United Nations Sustainable Development Group in partnership with civil society actors. The project identifies social values such as trust, solidarity, helpfulness, friendliness, hospitality and the willingness to finance public goods with the help of anonymous surveys. The surveys started in 2016.

== Integrating history and socio-economic analysis ==
=== Beyond Putnam ===
While influential, some have identified areas of concern or improvement within the work of Robert D. Putnam. This includes:

- the lack of awareness of the structural socio-economic conditions of society. For example, the level of income inequality.
- the excessive determinism of the historical analysis.
- Putnam's social capital index does not consider racial diversity which links to worse outcomes. Nor does Putnam consider ethnic diversity, which often creates barriers to cooperation and democratization.
- the conflation of social capital with civil society, the lack of empirical evidence connecting social capital's promotion of economic growth and substantiating the decline of social capital in the United States in the last 35 years, and the assumption that social networks produce win-win relationships.

=== Social capital motives ===
Robison and colleagues (2012) measured the relative importance of selfishness and four social capital motives using resource allocation data collected in hypothetical surveys and non-hypothetical experiments.

The selfishness motive assumes that an agent's allocation of a scarce resource is independent of his relationships with others. This motive is sometimes referred to as the selfishness of preference assumption in neoclassical economics.

Social capital motives assume that agents' allocation of a scarce resource may be influenced by their social capital or sympathetic relationships with others which may produce socio-emotional goods that satisfy socio-emotional needs for validation and belonging:

1. The first social capital motive seeks for validation by acting consistently with the values of one's ideal self.
2. The second social capital motive seeks to be validated by others by winning their approval.
3. The third social capital motive seeks to belong. Recognizing that one may not be able to influence the sympathy of others, persons seeking to belong may act to increase their own sympathy for others and the organizations or institutions they represent.
4. The fourth social capital motive recognizes that our sympathy or social capital for another person will motivate us to act in their interest. In doing so we satisfy our own needs for validation and belonging. Empirical results reject the hypothesis often implied in economics that we are 95% selfish.

== Relation with civil society ==
Various authors give definitions of civil society that refer to voluntary associations and organisations outside the market and state. This definition is very close to that of the third sector, which is generally defined as private organisations (not of the state) that are formed and sustained by groups of people acting voluntarily and without seeking personal profit (not of private, profit seeking industry) to provide benefits for themselves or for others. Third Sector as a term is derived from these organisations place as not part of the state, and not part of private, for profit industry, but rather a third sector.

According to such authors as Walzer (1992), Alessandrini (2002), Newtown, Stolle & Rochon, Foley & Edwards (1997), and Walters, it is through civil society, or more accurately, the third sector, that individuals are able to establish and maintain relational networks. These voluntary associations also connect people with each other, build trust and reciprocity through informal, loosely structured associations, and consolidate society through altruism without obligation. It is "this range of activities, services and associations produced by... civil society" that constitutes the sources of social capital.

Not only has civil society been documented to produce sources of social capital, according to Lyons' Third Sector (2001), social capital does not appear in any guise under either the factors that enable or those that stimulate the growth of the third sector. Likewise, Onyx (2000) describes how social capital depends on an already functioning community. The idea that creating social capital (i.e., creating networks) will strengthen civil society underlies current Australian social policy aimed at bridging deepening social divisions. The goal is to reintegrate those marginalised from the rewards of the economic system into "the community." However, according to Onyx (2000), while the explicit aim of this policy is inclusion, its effects are exclusionary.

Foley and Edwards (1997) believe that "political systems...are important determinants of both the character of civil society and of the uses to which whatever social capital exists might be put." Alessandrini agrees, saying that, "in Australia in particular, neo-liberalism has been recast as economic rationalism and identified by several theorists and commentators as a danger to society at large because of the use to which they are putting social capital to work."

The resurgence of interest in social capital as a remedy for the cause of today's social problems draws directly on the assumption that these problems lie in the weakening of civil society. However this ignores the arguments of many theorists who believe that social capital leads to exclusion rather than to a stronger civil society. In international development, Ben Fine (2001) and John Harriss (2001) have been heavily critical of the inappropriate adoption of social capital as a supposed panacea (promoting civil society organisations and NGOs, for example, as agents of development) for the inequalities generated by neoliberal economic development. This leads to controversy as to the role of state institutions in the promotion of social capital. An abundance of social capital is seen as being almost a necessary condition for modern liberal democracy. A low level of social capital leads to an excessively rigid and unresponsive political system and high levels of corruption, in the political system and in the region as a whole. Formal public institutions require social capital in order to function properly, and while it is possible to have too much social capital (resulting in rapid changes and excessive regulation), it is decidedly worse to have too little.

=== Sample societies ===
Post-Communist: Kathleen Dowley and Brian Silver published an article entitled "Social Capital, Ethnicity and Support for Democracy in the Post-Communist States", in which they find that in post-communist states, higher levels of social capital did not equate to higher levels of democracy. However, higher levels of social capital led to higher support for democracy.

Third-world: A number of intellectuals in developing countries have argued that the idea of social capital, particularly when connected to certain ideas about civil society, is deeply implicated in contemporary modes of donor and NGO-driven imperialism and that it functions, primarily, to blame the poor for their condition.

Chinese: The concept of social capital in a Chinese social context has been closely linked with the concept of guanxi.

American: One attempt to measure social capital, involving the quantity, quality and strength of an individual social capital, was spearheaded by Corporate Alliance in the English-speaking market segment of the US, and Xentrum through the Latin American Chamber of Commerce in Utah on the Spanish-speaking population of the same country. With the assistance of software applications and web-based relationship-oriented systems such as LinkedIn, these kinds of organizations are expected to provide its members with a way to keep track of the number of their relationships, meetings designed to boost the strength of each relationship using group dynamics, executive retreats and networking events as well as training in how to reach out to higher circles of influential people.

== Effects on women's engagement with politics ==
There are many factors that drive volume towards the ballot box, including education, employment, civil skills, and time. Careful evaluation of these fundamental factors often suggests that women do not vote at similar levels as men. However the gap between women and men voter turnout is diminishing and in some cases women are becoming more prevalent at the ballot box than their male counterparts. Recent research on social capital is now serving as an explanation for this change.

Social capital offers a wealth of resources and networks that facilitate political engagement. Since social capital is readily available no matter the type of community, it is able to override more traditional queues for political engagement; e.g.: education, employment, civil skills, etc.

There are unique ways in which women organize. These differences from men make social capital more personable and impressionable to women audiences thus creating a stronger presence in regards to political engagement. A few examples of these characteristics are:

- Women's informal and formal networks tend toward care work that is often considered apolitical.
- Women are also more likely to engage in local politics and social movement activities than in traditional forums focused on national politics.
- Women are more likely to organize themselves in less hierarchical ways and to focus on creating consensus.

The often informal nature of female social capital allows women to politicize apolitical environments without conforming to masculine standards, thus keeping this activity at a low public profile. These differences are hard to recognize within the discourse of political engagement and may explain why social capital has not been considered as a tool for female political engagement until as of late.

== Effects on health ==
A growing body of research has found that the presence of social capital through social networks and communities has a protective quality on health. Social capital affects health risk behavior in the sense that individuals who are embedded in a network or community rich in support, social trust, information, and norms, have resources that help achieve health goals. For example, a person who is sick with cancer may receive the information, money, or moral support needed to endure treatment and recover. Social capital also encourages social trust and membership. These factors can discourage individuals from engaging in risky health behaviors such as smoking and binge drinking.

Furthermore, neighbourhood social capital may also aid in buffering health inequities amongst children and adolescents. Social capital indicators such as neighbourhood cohesion, social support, and ties providing a bond between members of the same religion, have been found to be associated with better health despite financial or socioeconomic hardship. The function of social capital as a health buffer in circumstances of social disadvantage has also received attention in research on the health of minority ethnic populations, including refugee communities. The relationships and networks that are maintained by an ethnic minority population in a geographical area where a high percentage of residents belong to the same ethnic group may lead to better health outcomes than would be expected based on other individual and neighbourhood characteristics. Such effects have been investigated in England, New Zealand, and the United States.

Inversely, a lack of social capital can impair health. For example, results from a survey given to 13- to 18-year-old students in Sweden showed that low social capital and low social trust are associated with higher rates of psychosomatic symptoms, musculoskeletal pain, and depression. Additionally, negative social capital can detract from health. Although there are only a few studies that assess social capital in criminalized populations, there is information that suggests that social capital does have a negative effect in broken communities. Deviant behavior is encouraged by deviant peers via favorable definitions and learning opportunities provided by network-based norms. However, in these same communities, an adjustment of norms (i.e. deviant peers being replaced by positive role models) can pose a positive effect. Researchers have also investigated the hypothesis that the health benefits of social capital depend on the socioeconomic resources an individual or community has available to them. For example, social capital may boost health only for those with higher levels of education, or more so for those with a higher rather than a lower income. This research is based on Bourdieu's notion that social, economic, and cultural capital are dependent on each other.

== Influence of the Internet ==
Similar to watching the news and keeping abreast of current events, the use of the Internet can relate to an individual's level of social capital. In one study, informational uses of the Internet correlated positively with an individual's production of social capital, and social-recreational uses were negatively correlated (higher levels of these uses correlated with lower levels of social capital). An example supporting the former argument is the contribution of Peter Maranci's blog (Charlie on the Commuter Line) to address the train problems in Massachusetts. He created it after an incident where a lady passed out during a train ride due to the congestion in the train and help was delayed because of the congestion in the train and the inefficiency of the train conductor. His blog exposed the poor conditions of train stations, overcrowding train rides and inefficiency of the train conductor which eventually influenced changes within the transit system.

Another perspective holds that the rapid growth of social networking sites such as Facebook and Myspace suggests that individuals are creating a virtual-network consisting of both bonding and bridging social capital. Unlike face to face interaction, people can instantly connect with others in a targeted fashion by placing specific parameters with Internet use. This means that individuals can selectively connect with others based on ascertained interests, and backgrounds. Facebook is currently the most popular social networking site and touts many advantages to its users including serving as a social lubricant for individuals who otherwise have difficulties forming and maintaining both strong and weak ties with others.

This argument continues, although the preponderance of evidence shows a positive association between social capital and the Internet. Critics of virtual communities believe that the Internet replaces our strong bonds with online "weak-ties" or with socially empty interactions with the technology itself. Others fear that the Internet can create a world of "narcissism of similarity," where sociability is reduced to interactions between those that are similar in terms of ideology, race, or gender. A few articles suggest that technologically based interactions has a negative relationship with social capital by displacing time spent engaging in geographical/ in-person social activities. However, the consensus of research shows that the more time people spend online the more in-person contact they have, thus positively enhancing social capital.

Recent research, conducted in 2006, also shows that Internet users often have wider networks than those who access the Internet irregularly or not at all. When not considering family and work contacts, Internet users actually tend to have contact with a higher number of friends and relatives. This is supported by another study that shows that Internet users and non-Internet users do feel equally close to the same number of people; also the Internet users maintain relationships with 20% more people whom they "feel somewhat close" to.

Other research shows that younger people use the Internet as a supplemental medium for communication, rather than letting the Internet communication replace face-to-face contact. This supports the view that Internet communication does not hinder development of social capital and does not make people feel lonelier than before.

Ellison, Steinfield & Lampe (2007) suggest social capital exercised online is a result of relationships formed offline; whereby, bridging capital is enabled through a "maintenance" of relationships. Among respondents of this study, social capital built exclusively online creates weaker ties. A distinction of social bonding is offered by Ellison et al., 2007, suggesting bonds, or strong ties, are possible through social media, but less likely.

Conversely, in the afterword to the second edition of Bowling Alone (2020), political scientist Robert D. Putnam found that the expansion of internet access, social media, social networking services, online dating services, professional networking services, and e-commerce was probably accelerating the decline in social capital among the U.S. population that began in the 1960s, while mostly just reinforcing existing social connections rather than creating new ones (i.e. bonding social capital versus bridging social capital)—analogously to the effect that the expansion of telephone ownership by U.S. households had (which grew from an ownership rate of 1 percent in 1890 to a majority by 1946 and to 75 percent by 1957).

In the first edition of Bowling Alone (2000), Putnam found that the social capital decline was caused primarily by the expansion of television ownership by U.S. households (which grew from an ownership rate of 1 percent in 1948 to 75 percent by 1955), the gradual replacement of the Greatest Generation and Silent Generation birth year cohorts by the Baby boomer and Generation X birth year cohorts, and the effect of the television ownership expansion on Baby boomers and Generation X. Putnam anticipated that if internet use resembled television and telephone use that the impact of the internet on social capital would largely be the same as the television and the telephone, but Putnam rejected technological determinism in suggesting that the impacts of the internet on social capital was not inevitable and would depend on how Americans collectively chose to use the internet. With respect to political and civic engagement specifically, Putnam referenced meta-analyses and other research in political science in the second edition of Bowling Alone that concluded that the effects of social networking services and social media on political and civic participation was minimal or negative.

When considered with the use of social media for passive observation or online-only and low-effort support of political and social movements, Putnam concluded that the relationship between internet activism and offline activism is correlational rather than causal in light of research about pre-internet political and social movements (such as the civil rights movement and opposition to the Vietnam War in the United States and the 1989 Peaceful Revolution in East Germany) showing that personal connections with other activists are a stronger predictor of which individuals remain part of a movement rather than ideological commitment. Instead, Putnam argued that the weight of the research showed that social media has exacerbated political polarization in the United States due to ideological and socioeconomic homophily among user social networks and social media algorithms that promote echo chambers, virtue signalling, and disinformation. However, Putnam also suggested that these effects of social media owed to the surveillance capitalism business models of the companies that operated the services rather than the technology itself, which created incentives for the companies to promote consumerism rather than building social capital and social trust.

== Effects on educational achievement ==
=== Catholic schools (Coleman and Hoffer) ===
Coleman and Hoffer collected quantitative data of 28,000 students in total 1,015 public, Catholic and other private high schools in America from the 7 years' period from 1980 to 1987. It was found from this longitudinal research that social capital in students' families and communities attributed to the much lower dropout rates in Catholic schools compared with the higher rates in public.

Teachman et al. (1996) further develop the family structure indicator suggested by Coleman. They criticise Coleman, who used only the number of parents present in the family, neglected the unseen effect of more discrete dimensions such as stepparents' and different types of single-parent families. They take into account of a detailed counting of family structure, not only with two biological parents or stepparent families, but also with types of single-parent families with each other (mother-only, father-only, never-married, and other). They also contribute to the literature by measuring parent-child interaction by the indicators of how often parents and children discuss school-related activities.

Morgan and Sorensen (1999) directly challenge Coleman for his lacking of an explicit mechanism to explain why Catholic schools students perform better than public school students on standardised tests of achievement. Researching students in Catholic schools and public schools again, they propose two comparable models of social capital effect on mathematic learning. One is on Catholic schools as norm-enforcing schools whereas another is on public schools as horizon-expanding schools. It is found that while social capital can bring about positive effect of maintaining an encompassing functional community in norm-enforcing schools, it also brings about the negative consequence of excessive monitoring. Creativity and exceptional achievement would be repressed as a result. Whereas in horizon expanding school, social closure is found to be negative for student's mathematic achievement. These schools explore a different type of social capital, such as information about opportunities in the extended social networks of parents and other adults. The consequence is that more learning is fostered than norm-enforcing Catholic school students. In sum, Morgan and Sorensen study implies that social capital is contextualised, one kind of social capital may be positive in this setting but is not necessarily still positive in another setting.

=== Community development ===
In the setting of education through Kilpatrick, Johns, and Mulford (2010) state that "social capital is a useful lens for analysing lifelong learning and its relationship to community development." Social capital is particularly important in terms of education. Also the importance of education with "schools being designed to create 'functioning community' - forging tighter links between parents and the school" linking that without this interaction, the social capital in this area is disadvantaged and demonstrates that social capital plays a major role in education.

=== Parental involvement ===
Putnam (2000) mentions in his book Bowling Alone, "Child development is powerfully shaped by social capital" and continues "presence of social capital has been linked to various positive outcomes, particularly in education." According to his book, these positive outcomes are the result of parents' social capital in a community. In states where there is a high social capital, there is also a high education performance. The similarity of these states is that parents were more associated with their children's education. Teachers have reported that when the parents participate more in their children's education and school life, it lowers levels of misbehavior, such as bringing weapons to school, engaging in physical violence, unauthorized absence, and being generally apathetic about education. Borrowing Coleman's quotation from Putnam's book, Coleman once mentioned we cannot understate "the importance of the embeddedness of young persons in the enclaves of adults most proximate to them, first and most prominent the family and second, a surrounding community of adults."

=== Childcare Costs ===
Economic barriers such as high child care costs can limit access to social and economic opportunities, particularly for lower-income families, thereby contributing to broader patterns of social inequality. Childcare costs can contribute to social inequality as lower-income families often spend more of their income families often spend more of their income on care, limiting their access to economic opportunities. High childcare costs may also reduce labor force participation among lower-income parents, to them having to readjust to their economic inequalities.

Without social capital in the area of education, teachers and parents who play a responsibility in a students learning, the significant impacts on their child's academic learning can rely on these factors. With focus on parents contributing to their child's academic progress as well as being influenced by social capital in education. Without the contribution by the parent in their child's education, gives parents less opportunity and participation in the student's life. As Tedin and Weiher (2010) state, "one of the most important factors in promoting student success is the active involvement of parents in a child's education." With parents also involved in activities and meetings the school conducts, the more involved parents are with other parents and the staff members. Thus parent involvement contributes to social capital with becoming more involved in the school community and participating makes the school a sustainable and easy to run community.

Sampson et al. (1999) stress the normative or goal-directed dimension of social capital, claiming that "resources or networks alone (e.g. voluntary associations, friendship ties, organisational density) are neutral---they may or may not be effective mechanism for achieving intended effect."

=== Difference in male and female ===
Marjoribanks and Kwok (1998) conducted a survey in Hong Kong secondary schools with 387 fourteen-year-old students with an aim to analyse female and male adolescents differential educational achievement by using social capital as the main analytic tool. In that research, social capital is approved of its different effects upon different genders.

=== Adaption and ethnic values ===
In his thesis "New Arrival Students in Hong Kong: Adaptation and School Performance", Hei Hang Hayes Tang (2002) argues that adaptation is a process of activation and accumulation of (cultural and social) capitals. The research findings show that supportive networks is the key determinant differentiating the divergent adaptation pathways. Supportive networks, as a form of social capital, is necessary for activating the cultural capital the newly arrived students possessed. The amount of accumulated capital is also relevant to further advancement in the ongoing adaptation process.

Min Zhou and Carl L. Bankston (1998), in their study of a Vietnamese community in New Orleans, found that preserving traditional ethnic values enable immigrants to integrate socially and to maintain solidarity in an ethnic community. Ethnic solidarity is especially important in the context where immigrants just arrive in the host society. In her article "Social Capital in Chinatown", Zhou examines how the process of adaptation of young Chinese Americans is affected by tangible forms of social relations between the community, immigrant families, and the younger generations. Chinatown serves as the basis of social capital that facilitates the accommodation of immigrant children in the expected directions. Ethnic support provides impetus to academic success. Furthermore, maintenance of literacy in native language also provides a form of social capital that contributes positively to academic achievement. Stanton-Salazar and Dornbusch found that bilingual students were more likely to obtain the necessary forms of institutional support to advance their school performance and their life chances.

== In fields of study ==
=== Geography ===
In order to understand social capital as a subject in geography, one must look at it in a sense of space, place, and territory. In its relationship, the tenets of geography relate to the ideas of social capital in the family, community, and in the use of social networks. The biggest advocate for seeing social capital as a geographical subject was American economist and political scientist Robert Putnam. His main argument for classifying social capital as a geographical concept is that the relationships of people is shaped and molded by the areas in which they live.

There are many areas in which social capital can be defined by the theories and practices. In 1984, Anthony Giddens developed a theory in which he relates social structures and the actions that they produce. In his studies, he does not look at the individual participants of these structures, but how the structures and the social connections that stem from them are diffused over space. If this is the case, the continuous change in social structures could bring about a change in social capital, which can cause changes in community atmosphere. If an area is plagued by social organizations whose goals are to revolt against social norms, such as gangs, it can cause a negative social capital for the area causing those who disagreed with these organizations to relocate thus taking their positive social capital to a different space than the negative.

Another area where social capital can be seen as an area of study in geography is through the analysis of participation in volunteerism and its support of different governments. One area to look into with this is through those who participate in social organizations. People that participate are of different races, ages, and economic status. With these in mind, variances of the space in which these different demographics may vary, causing a difference in involvement among areas. Secondly, there are different social programs for different areas based on economic situation. A governmental organization would not place a welfare center in a wealthier neighborhood where it would have very limited support to the community, as it is not needed. Thirdly, social capital can be affected by the participation of individuals of a certain area based on the type of institutions that are placed there. Mohan supports this with the argument of J. Fox in his paper "Decentralization and Rural Development in Mexico", which states "structures of local governance in turn influence the capacity of grassroots communities to influence social investments." With this theory, if the involvement of a government in specific areas raises the involvement of individuals in social organizations and/or communities, this will in turn raise the social capital for that area. Since every area is different, the government takes that into consideration and will provide different areas with different institutions to fit their needs thus there will be different changes in social capital in different areas.

Social capital has been used by Ostrom and others to explain why some groups can successfully maintain commons resources. In contrast, in Beyond Collective Action Problems (2024), Atul Pokharel argues that perceived fairness, rather than social capital, better explains why some communities sustain cooperation over long periods. Drawing on a follow-up survey of 233 farmer-managed irrigation systems in Nepal originally documented by Elinor Ostrom and colleagues, Pokharel contends that users' assessments of whether a cooperative arrangement is fair are more closely associated with continued cooperation than social capital–based accounts predict.

=== Leisure studies ===
In the context of leisure studies, social capital is seen as the consequence of investment in and cultivation of social relationships allowing an individual access to resources that would otherwise be unavailable to him or her. The concept of social capital in relation to leisure is grounded in a perspective that emphasizes the interconnectedness rather than the separateness of human activity and human goals. There is a significant connection between leisure and democratic social capital. Specific forms of leisure activity contribute to the development of the social capital central to democracy and democratic citizenship. The more an individual participates in social activities, the more autonomy the individual experiences, which will help her or his individual abilities and skills to develop. The greater the accumulation of social capital a person experiences, may transfer to other leisure activities as well as personal social roles, relationships and in other roles within a social structure.

=== Social capital, marriage, and romantic relationships ===
Kislev (2019) shows that following vast changes to the status of marriage in modern society singles present higher social capital. They also derive greater happiness from equal levels of social capital compared with married people. In a later study, Kislev (2020) shows the relation between romantic relationships desire and singleness. He shows that a lower degree of relationship desire has a significant effect on the relative importance of friends. Furthermore, both higher levels of the relative importance of friends and social satisfaction are negatively correlated with relationship desire.

== Effects on informal economies ==
Social capital has been associated with the reduction in access to informal credit in informal economies (especially in developing countries). Social capital in rural communities bring business-related knowledge and skills, entrepreneurial wellbeing, and economic benefits for individuals within communities, while for the community as a whole, strong social capital also brings extra shared economic benefits, and it can also foster socio-cultural change within the community.

Similar results were revealed in a cross-sectional study run by Sarker in Bangladesh. Some other authors also note the importance of social capital among female entrepreneurship. Epo (2013) presented the case that social capital and micro loans increase the likelihood of female entrepreneurship in Cameroon. Epo did this by comparing the welfare outcomes of the entrepreneurs who both had access and no access. Other authors, however, disagree about the positive correlation between social capital and microfinance, Kanak and Iiguni argue that formation of social capital is largely dependent on strategies implemented by Microfinance Institutions. Kanak and Iiguni determined this while investigating social capital formation in a rural village in Bangladesh.

For their study in Indian rural communities, Trivedi and colleagues make a distinction between internal social capital, i.e. within a rural community, and external social capital, i.e., between people from the community with people outside the community. They argue that both internal and external social capital need to be in place for a rural community to create entrepreneurial and economic benefits, which in turn can reduce poverty.

== See also ==
- Cultural economics – Branch of economics
- Diplomatic capital
- Intellectual capital management
- Organisational capital
- Organization workshop – Business education workshop
- Political capital – Means by which a politician or political party may gain support or popularity
- Reed's law – Increase in utility with network size
- Relational capital
- Reputation – Social opinion about an entity
- Sexual capital – Social value from sexual attractiveness
- Social currency – Sociological concept
- Soft power – Ability to co-opt rather than coerce
- Structural capital – Primary component of intellectual capital
- True cost accounting – Accounting that measures the hidden impacts of economic activities on the environment
- Trust capital
