= Lewis M. Feldstein =

Lewis M. Feldstein is the co-chair of The Saguaro Seminar along with Robert D. Putnam and was President of the New Hampshire Charitable Foundation until June 2010. He collaborates with Putnum and many others on publications and projects such as the Better Together book and website aimed at promoting community and civic engagement.

Feldstein is a graduate of Brown University and holds a master's degree in Law and Diplomacy from Tufts University. Besides receiving six honorary doctorates, Feldstein has been a wine steward and personal assistant to John Wayne on his yacht in the Mediterranean, senior staff member for New York City Mayor John V. Lindsay and worked with the civil rights movement in Mississippi.
