= DDB Needham Life Style Surveys =

DDB Needham Life Style Surveys were a series of yearly surveys organized by DDB Needham advertising agency, measuring a number of social trends in United States.

They began in 1975 and continued as late as 1999. Yearly samples were about 3,000 3,500-4,000 or 5,000 respondents (difference in reported numbers seems to be related to some sources citing numbers of surveys send versus number of respondents). Surveys were sent out in April, with a follow-up in May targeting groups with below-average response rates (low income groups and minorities, such as African Americans and Hispanics).

The survey was composed of 300-400 questions about product consumption, interests, opinions, habits, personality traits and similar topics. The response rates were over 60%.

The DDB Needham Life Style surveys have been used in multiple studies. They have been popularized by Robert Putnam who used the survey data in his Bowling Alone, called it "one of the richest known sources of data on social change in American in the last quarter of the twentieth century".

== Limitations ==
Until 1985, the survey included only married households.

== See also ==
- General Social Survey
- Social Capital Community Benchmark Survey
- World Values Survey
