= Robert D. Putnam =

American political scientist (born 1941)

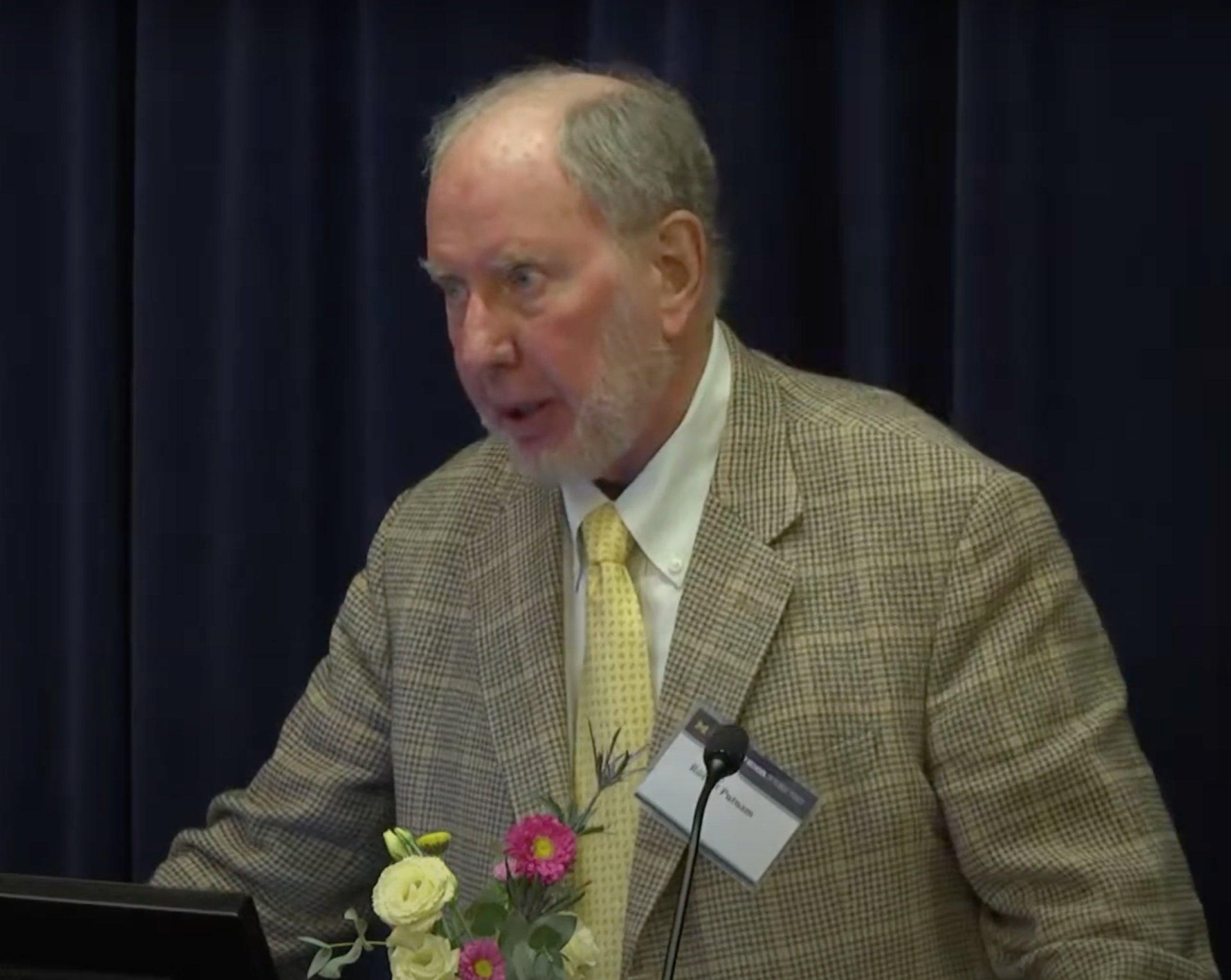
- Putnam in 2019
- Born: Robert David Putnam; January 9, 1941 (age 85); Rochester, New York, U.S.
- Other name: Bob Putnam
- Spouse: Rosemary (m. 1963)
- Awards: Commander of the Order of the Star of Italian Solidarity (2004); Skytte Prize (2006); National Humanities Medal (2012)

Academic background
- Education: Swarthmore College (BA); Balliol College, Oxford; Yale University (MA, PhD)
- Thesis: Politicians and Politics (1970)

Academic work
- Discipline: Political sociology
- School or tradition: Communitarianism
- Institutions: University of Michigan; Harvard University
- Doctoral students: David E. Campbell; David Rayside
- Main interests: Social capital
- Notable works: Making Democracy Work (1993); Bowling Alone (2000)
- Notable ideas: Two-level game theory

Robert David Putnam (Note: Pronounced /ˈpʌtnəm/.) (born January 9, 1941) is an American political scientist specializing in comparative politics. He is the Peter and Isabel Malkin Professor of Public Policy at the Harvard University John F. Kennedy School of Government.

Putnam developed the influential two-level game theory that assumes international agreements will only be successfully brokered if they also result in domestic benefits. His most famous work, Bowling Alone, argues that the United States has undergone an unprecedented collapse in civic, social, associational, and political life (social capital) since the 1960s, with serious negative consequences. In March 2015, he published a book called Our Kids: The American Dream in Crisis that looked at issues of inequality of opportunity in the United States. According to the Open Syllabus Project, Putnam is the fourth most frequently cited author on college syllabi for political science courses.

Join or Die, a 2023 documentary film about community connections and club participation that is available on Netflix, features Putnam and is based on Putnam's works.

== Early life and career ==
Robert David Putnam was born on January 9, 1941, in Rochester, New York, and grew up in Port Clinton, Ohio, where he participated in a competitive bowling league as a teenager. Putnam graduated from Swarthmore College in 1963 where he was a member of the Phi Sigma Kappa fraternity. He won a Fulbright Fellowship to study at Balliol College, Oxford, and went on to earn a master's degree and doctorate from Yale University in 1970.

He taught at the University of Michigan until joining the faculty at Harvard in 1979, where he has held a variety of positions, including Dean of the Kennedy School, and is currently the Malkin Professor of Public Policy. Putnam was raised as a religiously observant Methodist. In 1963, Putnam married his wife Rosemary, a special education teacher and French horn player. Around the time of his marriage, he converted to Judaism, his wife's religion.

== Making Democracy Work ==
His first work in the area of social capital was Making Democracy Work: Civic Traditions in Modern Italy, published in 1993. It is a comparative study of regional governments in Italy that drew great scholarly attention for its argument that the success of democracies depends in large part on the horizontal bonds that make up social capital. Putnam writes that northern Italy's history of community, guilds, clubs, and choral societies led to greater civic involvement and greater economic prosperity. Meanwhile, the agrarian society of Southern Italy is less prosperous economically and democratically because of less social capital. Social capital, which Putnam defines as "networks and norms of civic engagement", allows members of a community to trust one another. When community members trust one another, trade, money-lending, and democracy flourish.

Putnam's finding that social capital has pro-democracy effects has been rebutted by a sizable literature which finds that civic associations have been associated with the rise of anti-democratic movements.

== Bowling Alone ==
League participation peaked in the 1960s and 1970s. League bowling was used as a barometer of social capital in Bowling Alone (2000).

In 1995, he published "Bowling Alone: America's Declining Social Capital" in the Journal of Democracy. The article was widely read and garnered much attention for Putnam, including an invitation to meet with then-President Bill Clinton and a spot in the pages of People.

In 2000, he published Bowling Alone: The Collapse and Revival of American Community, a book-length expansion of the original argument, adding new evidence and answering many of his critics. Though he measured the decline of social capital with data of many varieties, his most striking point was that many traditional civic, social and fraternal organizations – typified by bowling leagues – had undergone a massive decline in membership while the number of people bowling had increased dramatically.

Putnam distinguishes two kinds of social capital: bonding capital and bridging capital. Bonding occurs among similar people (same age, same race, same religion, etc.), while bridging involves the same activities among dissimilar people. He argues that peaceful multi-ethnic societies require both types. Putnam argues that those two kinds of social capital, bonding and bridging, do strengthen each other. Consequently, with the decline of the bonding capital mentioned above inevitably comes the decline of the bridging capital leading to greater ethnic tensions.

Since the publication of Bowling Alone, Putnam has worked on efforts to revive American social capital, notably through the Saguaro Seminar, a series of meetings among academics, civil society leaders, commentators, and politicians to discuss strategies to re-connect Americans with their communities. These resulted in the publication of the book and website, Better Together, in 2003 which provides case studies of vibrant and new forms of social capital building in the United States.

In 2016, Putnam explained his inspiration for the book, by saying,

We've [Americans] been able to run a different kind of society. A less statist society, a more free-market society, because we had real strength in the area of social capital and we had relatively high levels of social trust. We sort of did trust one another, not perfectly, of course, but we did. Not compared to other countries. And all that is declining, and I began to worry, "Well, gee, isn't that going to be a problem, if our system is built for one kind of people and one kind of community, and now we've got a different one. Maybe it's not going to work so well."

In a review essay, economist Steven Durlauf criticized the scholarly analysis in Bowling Alone. He argued that Putnam uses the term social capital inconsistently for distinct phenomena, including social networks, information flows, reciprocity, and trustworthiness, without adequately explaining why they should be treated as a single concept. Although Durlauf regarded Putnam’s documentation of declining participation in voluntary organizations as persuasive, he argued that the book provides neither a well-developed causal explanation for this decline nor convincing evidence that it represents a decline in social capital. Declining participation could, for example, reflect reduced social pressure to join organizations, while government programmes or markets may sometimes replace functions previously performed through informal associations, such as private welfare provision, parental involvement in education, or mutual credit arrangements. Durlauf also argued that Putnam frequently treats correlations between measures of social capital and socioeconomic outcomes as evidence of causal effects, although the studies and state-level comparisons presented in the book do not adequately distinguish social-capital explanations from competing explanations. He further maintained that Putnam sometimes draws claims from cited studies that those studies do not support. Finally, although Putnam acknowledges a “dark side” of social capital, Durlauf argued that he underestimates how group solidarity and social sanctions can reinforce conformity, racial segregation, stereotyping, and hostility toward outsiders. Durlauf concluded that the book presents an impressive collection of facts but is ultimately unsuccessful as a work of social-science scholarship because of its conceptual ambiguity and failure to address fundamental problems of causal inference.

Critics such as the sociologist Claude Fischer argue that Putnam (a) concentrates on certain forms of social organizations, and pays much less attention to privatized networks or emerging forms of support organizations on and off the Internet; (b) relies on contradictory data that hasn't fully been explained; and (c) underestimates the impact of women's workforce participation. Fischer calls for reconceptualizing social capital and proposing other explanations of the decline in public civic participation.

== Social capital ==
Putnam theorizes a relation in the negative trends in society. He envisions a uniting factor named social capital; originally coined (no evidence provided) by social theorist Alexis de Tocqueville as a strength within America allowing democracy to thrive due to the closeness of society, "trends in civic engagement of a wider sort". Putnam observes a declining trend in social capital since the 1960s. The decreasing in social capital is blamed for rising rates in unhappiness as well as political apathy. Low social capital, a feeling of alienation within society is associated with additional consequences such as:

- Lower confidence in local government, local leaders and the local news media.
- Lower political efficacy – that is, confidence in one's own influence.
- Lower frequency of registering to vote, but more interest and knowledge about politics and more participation in protest marches and social reform groups.
- Higher political advocacy, but lower expectations that it will bring about a desirable result.
- Less expectation that others will cooperate to solve dilemmas of collective action (e.g., voluntary conservation to ease a water or energy shortage).
- Less likelihood of working on a community project.
- Less likelihood of giving to charity or volunteering.
- Fewer close friends and confidants.
- Less happiness and lower perceived quality of life.
- More time spent watching television and more agreement that "television is my most important form of entertainment".

== Diversity and trust within communities ==
Putnam examined the relationship between ethnic diversity and trust using survey data from approximately 30,000 respondents, including samples from 41 communities across the United States. He reported that, in the short to medium term, greater neighbourhood ethnic diversity was associated with lower trust both between ethnic groups and among members of the same ethnic group. Putnam described residents of diverse communities as “hunkering down”: withdrawing from collective life and expressing less trust in their neighbours. In his multivariate analysis of trust in neighbours, the association with ethnic diversity remained after controlling for individual and neighbourhood characteristics, including poverty, income inequality, and crime. Putnam says, however, that "in the long run immigration and diversity are likely to have important cultural, economic, fiscal, and developmental benefits."

In a 2011 study, Patrick Sturgis, Ian Brunton-Smith, Sanna Read, and Nick Allum reconsidered Putnam’s “hunkering down” thesis using survey data from nearly 25,000 people in Britain. They argued that Putnam’s conclusions do not clearly distinguish between generalized trust in people generally and strategic trust in people known to the respondent, because survey questions used to measure trust do not necessarily capture the same form of trust. They also questioned the substantive importance of Putnam’s findings. Although the association reported in Putnam’s study was statistically significant, ethnic diversity accounted for less than 0.1 per cent of the variation in trust. In their own analysis, they found no effect of neighbourhood ethnic diversity on generalized trust. Diversity was statistically associated with strategic trust, but the association was substantively trivial and was dwarfed by the effects of economic deprivation and individuals’ social contact with their neighbours (social connectedness). The authors therefore concluded that the relationship between ethnic diversity and trust was weak, contingent on its social and economic context, and less generally corrosive than Putnam’s account suggested.

Putnam published his data set from this study in 2001 and subsequently published the full paper in 2007. Putnam has been criticized for the lag between his initial study and his publication of his article. In 2006, Putnam was quoted in the Financial Times as saying he had delayed publishing the article until he could "develop proposals to compensate for the negative effects of diversity" (quote from John Lloyd of Financial Times). In 2007, writing in City Journal, John Leo questioned whether this suppression of publication was ethical behavior for a scholar, noting that "Academics aren't supposed to withhold negative data until they can suggest antidotes to their findings." On the other hand, Putnam did release the data in 2001 and publicized this fact.

Putnam denied allegations he was arguing against diversity in society and contended that his paper had been "twisted" to make a case against race-based admissions to universities. He asserted that his "extensive research and experience confirm the substantial benefits of diversity, including racial and ethnic diversity, to our society."

== Recognition ==
=== Memberships and fellowships ===
He has been a member of Phi Beta Kappa since 1963, the International Institute of Strategic Studies since 1986, the American Philosophical Society since 2005 and the National Academy of Sciences since 2001. He has been a Fellow of the American Academy of Arts and Sciences from 1980 and a Corresponding Fellow of the British Academy from 2001 and was a Fellow of the National Academy of Public Administration, 1989–2006 and Center for Advanced Study in the Behavioral Sciences, 1974–1975 and 1988–1989. Other fellowships included the Guggenheim 1988–1989; the Woodrow Wilson International Center for Scholars 1977 and 1979; Fulbright 1964–1965 and 1977; SSRC-ACLS 1966–1968; Ford Foundation, 1970; German Marshall Fund, 1979; SSRC-Fulbright, 1982; SSRC-Foreign Policy Studies, 1988–1989 and was made a Harold Lasswell Fellow by the American Academy of Political and Social Science. Robert Putnam was a fellow of the Council on Foreign Relations 1977–1978 and a member since 1981. He was a member of the Trilateral Commission from 1990 to 1998. He was the President of the American Political Science Association (2001–2002). He had been Vice-president 1997–1998.

=== Awards ===
In 2004 the President of the Italian Republic made him a Commander of the Order of the Star of Italian Solidarity. He was awarded the Johan Skytte Prize in Political Science in 2006 and a Wilbur Lucius Cross Medal by the Yale Graduate School of Arts and Sciences in 2003, he was a Marshall Lecturer at the University of Cambridge in 1999 and was honored with the Ithiel de Sola Pool Award and Lectureship of the American Political Science Association.

He has received honorary degrees from Stockholm University (in 1993), Ohio State University (2000), University of Antwerp (also 2000), University of Edinburgh (2003), Libera Università Internazionale degli Studi Sociali Guido Carli (2011), University of Oxford (2018), University College London (2019), and his alma mater Yale University (2026)

In 2013, he was awarded the National Humanities Medal by President Barack Obama for "deepening our understanding of community in America."

In 2015, he was awarded the University of Bologna, ISA Medal for Science for research activities characterized by excellence and scientific value.

== Works ==
=== Books ===
- The Beliefs of Politicians: Ideology, Conflict, and Democracy in Britain and Italy. New Haven: Yale University Press, 1973.
- The Comparative Study of Political Elites. Englewood Cliffs, New Jersey: Prentice-Hall, 1976.
- (with Joel D. Aberbach and Bert A. Rockman). Bureaucrats and Politicians in Western Democracies. 1981.
- (with Nicholas Bayne). Hanging Together: Cooperation and Conflict in the Seven-Power Summits. 1984; revised 1987.
- (with Robert Leonardi and Raffaella Nanetti). Making Democracy Work: Civic Traditions in Modern Italy. 1993.
- Bowling Alone: The Collapse and Revival of American Community. 2000. ISBN 978-0-7432-0304-3
- (ed.) Democracies in Flux: The Evolution of Social Capital in Contemporary Society Oxford University Press, 2002.
- (with Lewis M. Feldstein). Better Together: Restoring the American Community. 2003. ISBN 978-1-4391-0688-4
- Staying Together: The G8 Summit Confronts the 21st Century. Aldershot, England: Ashgate Publishing, 2005. ISBN 978-0-7546-4267-1; OCLC 217979297)
- Clark, Tom; Putnam, Robert D.; Fieldhouse, Edward (2010). The Age of Obama: The Changing Place of Minorities in British and American Society (Illustrated ed.). Manchester, England: Manchester University Press. ISBN 978-0719082788.
- Putnam, Robert D.; Campbell, David E. (2012). American Grace: How Religion Divides and Unites Us. New York: Simon & Schuster. ISBN 978-1416566731.
- Putnam, Robert D. (2015). Our Kids: The American Dream in Crisis (Hardcover ed.). New York: Simon & Schuster. ISBN 978-1476769899.
- Putnam, Robert D.; Garrett, Shaylyn Romney (2020). The Upswing: How America Came Together a Century Ago and How We Can Do It Again (1st ed.). New York: Simon & Schuster. ISBN 978-1-9821-2914-9. OCLC 1142896590.

=== Chapters and articles ===
- "The Italian Communist Politician" in Communism in Italy and France Donald Blackmer and Sidney Tarrow, eds. Princeton: Princeton University Press.
- "Diplomacy and Domestic Politics: The Logic of Two-Level Games". International Organization, 42 (Summer 1988): 427–460.
- Putnam, Robert (2007). "E Pluribus Unum: Diversity and Community in the Twenty-first Century The 2006 Johan Skytte Prize Lecture". Scandinavian Political Studies. Johan Skytte Prize in Political Science. 30 (2): 137–174. doi:10.1111/j.1467-9477.2007.00176.x. Wikidata Q55880625.

=== Other ===
- Putnam, Robert D.; Bridgeland, John (October 19, 2017). "America needs big ideas to heal our divides. Here are three". PBS NewsHour. WETA.
- Putnam, Robert D.; Babcock-Lumish, Terry (September 28, 2022). "The White House bowling alley is a symbol of what's wrong with US politics". The Boston Globe.

== Interviews ==
External videos
- Presentation by Putnam on Bowling Alone, June 7, 2000, C-SPAN
- Booknotes interview with Putnam on Bowling Alone, December 24, 2000, C-SPAN
- Presentation by Putnam and Lewis Feldstein on Better Together, September 18, 2003, C-SPAN
- Presentation by Putnam on Our Kids, March 31, 2015, C-SPAN

- Putnam, Robert D. (May 31, 2000). "Going Bowling". All Things Considered (Interview). Interviewed by Robert Siegel. NPR.
- Putnam, Robert D. (August 15, 2007). "Political Scientist: Does Diversity Really Work?". Tell Me More (Interview). Interviewed by Michel Martin. NPR.
- Putnam, Robert D. (October 11, 2010). "Religious Diversity and the Building Blocks of 'American Grace'". PBS NewsHour (Interview). Interviewed by Paul Solman. WETA.
- Putnam, Robert D. (March 7, 2015). "'Bowling Alone' Author Tackles The American Dream". Weekend Edition (Interview). Interviewed by Scott Simon. NPR.
- Putnam, Robert D. (March 19, 2015). "What's splitting a new generation of haves and have-nots". PBS NewsHour (Interview). Interviewed by Paul Solman. WETA.
- Putnam, Robert D. (March 19, 2015). "Why you should care about other people's kids". PBS NewsHour (Interview). Interviewed by Paul Solman. WETA.
- Putnam, Robert D. (April 19, 2015). "Robert Putnam on Our Kids: The American Dream in Crisis" (Interview). Interviewed by Rich Fahle. PBS.
- Putnam, Robert D. (November 10, 2020). "How U.S. history could provide a path out of polarization". PBS NewsHour (Interview). Interviewed by Paul Solman. WETA.
- Putnam, Robert D. (March 15, 2022). "Politics And America's Loneliness Epidemic" (Interview). Interviewed by Danielle Kurtzleben. NPR.
- Putnam, Robert D. (July 13, 2024). "Robert Putnam Knows Why You're Lonely" (Interview). Interviewed by Lulu Garcia-Navarro. New York Times.
- Putnam, Robert D. (February 19, 2025). "Robert Putnam reflects on how America became so polarized and what can unify the nation". PBS NewsHour (Interview). Interviewed by Judy Woodruff. WETA.

== See also ==
- Elite theory
- DDB Needham Life Style Surveys
- Putnam family

== Notes ==
Academic offices
Preceded by Bruce Ackerman	Tanner Lecturer on Human Values at Princeton University; 2010	Succeeded by Stephen Greenblatt
Preceded by Bo Rothstein	Stein Rokkan Memorial Lecturer; 2011	Succeeded by Margaret Levi
Professional and academic associations
Preceded by Robert Jervis	President of the American; Political Science Association; 2001–2002	Succeeded by Theda Skocpol
Awards
Preceded by Linda Gordon	Wilbur Cross Medal; 2003; With: Edward L. Ayers, Gerald E. Brown, John B. Fenn, Charles Yanofsky, and Susan Hockfield	Succeeded by William Cronon
Preceded by Sharon R. Long	Wilbur Cross Medal; 2003; With: Edward L. Ayers, Gerald E. Brown, John B. Fenn, Charles Yanofsky, and Susan Hockfield	Succeeded by Lee Hong-koo
Preceded by Julia M. McNamara	Wilbur Cross Medal; 2003; With: Edward L. Ayers, Gerald E. Brown, John B. Fenn, Charles Yanofsky, and Susan Hockfield	Succeeded by Julia Phillips
Preceded by Julia M. McNamara	Wilbur Cross Medal; 2003; With: Edward L. Ayers, Gerald E. Brown, John B. Fenn, Charles Yanofsky, and Susan Hockfield	Succeeded by Peter Salovey
Preceded by David Price	Wilbur Cross Medal; 2003; With: Edward L. Ayers, Gerald E. Brown, John B. Fenn, Charles Yanofsky, and Susan Hockfield	Succeeded by Barbara A. Schaal
Preceded by David Price	Wilbur Cross Medal; 2003; With: Edward L. Ayers, Gerald E. Brown, John B. Fenn, Charles Yanofsky, and Susan Hockfield	Succeeded by Philip Zimbardo
Preceded by Robert Keohane	Johan Skytte Prize in Political Science; 2006	Succeeded by Theda Skocpol
Preceded by John C. Bogle	Gold Medal of the National Institute of Social Sciences; 2016; With: Pauline Newman and Richard Ottinger	Succeeded by Ron Chernow
Preceded by Paul Krugman	Gold Medal of the National Institute of Social Sciences; 2016; With: Pauline Newman and Richard Ottinger	Succeeded by Robert J. Shiller
Preceded by Michelle Kwan	Gold Medal of the National Institute of Social Sciences; 2016; With: Pauline Newman and Richard Ottinger	Succeeded by Michael I. Sovern
Preceded by Rein Taagepera	Karl Deutsch Award; 2018	Most recent
