= Exit planning =

Enterprise valuation strategy

Exit planning includes preparation for the exit of an entrepreneur from their company to maximize the enterprise value of the company in a mergers and acquisitions transaction, along with planning for the termination of other forms of business relationship such as the ending of a contract. For entrepreneurial exit, the protection of shareholder value is important, although other non-financial objectives may be pursued including the transition of the company to the next generation, sale to employees or management, or other altruistic, non-financial objectives.

Exit planning differs from succession planning in that the later is a sub-component of exit planning, and refers to the hiring, training and retention of a successor President/CEO of the company in a planned manner. Succession Planning is but one of the many considerations when conducting exit planning. Company owners commonly do not see their company from the standpoint of a potential buyer, and thus, ignore the strategic management of the company.

== Process ==
To achieve their desired outcomes, business owners often focus their attention on exit planning from the beginning of the investment, in order to prepare adequately for trade and financial sales, make effective use of the buy back option, market their businesses more widely for sale, use intermediaries and get the support of management Significant value is lost due to an absence of or inadequate exit planning. Roughly 30% of businesses will be transferred to family member in some manner, 18% intend to sell to its employees, and many will simply be closed. Up to one-third of businesses that are closed were successful at their termination.

The three sources of enterprise value in a company are firstly the value of its tangible assets, and secondly the value of its intellectual capital (intangible assets), which consist of human capital, relational capital, and structural capital (including is subcomponents organizational capital, innovation capital and process capital. Most of a middle-market company's and lower middle market company's value is derived from its relational capital, specifically, its customer relationships. SMEs, also referred to as middle market companies, create innovation capital (part of structural capital).

Most small-to-medium-sized businesses use a boutique investment bank to market their company in a mergers and acquisitions transaction to potential buyers. Some boutique investment banks also offer exit planning preparation, while certain consulting firms offer one or more of the services needed to conduct exit planning, such as human resources, in connection with succession planning.

Private equity groups are common acquirers of middle market businesses, whether as "platform" companies or add-on or tack-on acquisitions.

In addition to business aspects, personal considerations need to be taken into consideration, including considerations about estate taxes, capital gains taxes, or other taxes.
