= Process capital =

Process capital is the value to an enterprise which is derived from the techniques, procedures, and programs that implement and enhance the delivery of goods and services. Process capital is one of the three components of structural capital, itself a component of intellectual capital. Process capital can be seen as the value of processes to any entity, whether for profit or not-for-profit, but is most commonly used in reference to for-profit entities.

A process comprises a "series or network of value-added activities, performed by their relevant roles or collaborators, to purposefully achieve the common business goal.

Process capital can be created and enhanced by using business process mapping, business process modeling and business process management

== Roots ==
=== Process capital in organisations ===
Organisations invest in process capital in order to build a company’s unique infrastructure for achieving operational and strategic goals. Given the dynamics of industry and technology, the development of process capital evolves and interacts with environmental changes. Organisations have invested in information technology (IT) and organisational change programs to build process capital for achieving business excellence through customer satisfaction. The vast investments include: IT infrastructure implementation, quality-improvement projects, process-redesign projects, and various process integration projects. Although process capital plays an important role in organising resources, processing information, interacting with stakeholders, and delivering organisational values, few studies have discussed its specific content, and it is rare to focus attention on the level of its management. Instead, process capital has usually been hidden in the measurement of IT investment or organisational intellectual capital as an intangible element of organisational assets. Failure to treat process capital as a separate and unique management issue is widespread among both businesses and researchers because most of the systems and processes within the organisations are interdependent. Therefore, a systematic approach to measuring process capital is necessary to manage process potential to its full extent.

=== Definition ===
Capital is something owned which provides ongoing services. In the national accounts, or to firms, capital is made up of durable investment goods, normally summed in units of money. Process capital, in practice, embraces the practical knowledge of operations, techniques, and employee programs in the effort to extend and enhance the efficiency of manufacturing or the delivery of products and services for long-term value.

Failure to treat process capital as a separate and unique management issue is widespread among both businesses and researchers because most of the systems and processes within the organisations are interdependent. Therefore, a systematic approach to measuring process capital is necessary to manage process potential to its full extent.

== Strategy development ==
Process capital is essential for strategy development and implementation. Business processes are large with technology, location and other factors combining to generate limitless possibilities. Throughout the process of developing and appropriating technology-enabled processes, collective brainpower is formalised, captured, and leveraged to produce an asset of higher value and affect organisational performance in all aspects.

=== Organisational performance ===
Organisational performance can include the operational, managerial, and strategic impacts of different business efforts on the management of business processes. However, because organisational performance is influenced by numerous factors, the benefits from process capital can be expected to take up to several years to filter through the various levels of business performance. For example, a process integration technology may take months to develop and transform into real processes and to generate increased productivity. In addition, after processes emerge into business operation, greater managerial and strategic performance may appear later. Therefore, it is important to use proper measures to reflect process value for both the short and long term.

== Measuring process capital ==
=== Input method ===
The input method is measured by the resources invested in process capital for business operations. In economic terms, this is expected to predict the future value of the processes. The two measurement indicators for this method are investment in information technology and administrative expanses. Firm size and industry type are the two controlled variables that are used in all three methods.

=== Output method ===
The output method is measured by the total effort of managing the technology and operations which achieve business effectiveness. The process indicators measure the actual value of labor productivity, such as profit per employee, to determine the contribution to the firm's overall productivity. This method is based on reviewing past performances to predict future results.

=== Management capability ===
Management capability is the capability of constructing and coordinating resources to integrate and develop processes to respond to changing business conditions. The method measures the value of the process capital at the time of the measurement as a percentage change of the productivity compared to the previous year.

== Green capital ==
Studies show that process capital has a positive influence on competitive advantages of firms.

=== Competitive advantage ===
Companies engaging in environmental management and green innovation actively can not only minimise production waste and increase productivity, but also charge relatively high prices for green products, improve corporate images, and thereby obtain corporate competitive advantages under the trends of popular environmentalism consciousness of consumers and severe international regulations of environmental protection. Therefore, the stocks of organisational capabilities, organisational commitments, knowledge management systems, reward systems, information technology systems, databases, managerial institution, operation processes, managerial philosophies, organisational culture, company images, patents, copy rights, and trademarks, etc. about environmental protection or green innovation within a company can help companies obtain competitive advantages.

=== Measuring green capital ===
The measurement of green structural capital comprises the following nine items:

(1) whether the management system of environmental protection in the firm is superior to that of its major competitors;

(2) whether innovations about environmental protection in the firm are more than those of its major competitors;

(3) whether the profits earned from environmental protection activities of the firm is Effect of Green Intellectual Capital on Competitive Advantages of Firms 277 more than that of its major competitors;

(4) whether the ratio of investments in R&D expenditures about environmental protection in the firm to its sales is more than that of its major competitors;

(5) whether the ratio of employees about environmental management to the total employees in the firm is more than that of its major competitors;

(6) whether investments in environmental protection facilities in the firm are more than those of its major competitors;

(7) whether the competence in the development of green products in the firm is better than that of its major competitors;

(8) whether the overall operation processes about environmental protection in the firm work smoothly;

(9) whether the knowledge management system about environmental management in the firm is favorable for the accumulation and sharing of the knowledge of environmental management.

== Process capital and nursing ==
Process capital is one of the three components of structural capital. Nursing structural capital is knowledge converted into information structures that nurses can use to assist with their clinical decision-making and care planning. Nursing structural capital in the form of practice guidelines, care maps or protocols is believed to provide relevant information to nurses for improving the quality of care they deliver. Care maps, practice guidelines and protocols have been found to contribute to improved patient outcomes and reduce the rate of adverse events.

== Transforming human capital to structural capital ==
=== Distinguishing between information elements ===
The intellectual capital model distinguishes between three distinct elements: Human Capital, Structural Capital, and Relational Capital. Leadership represents ideas of Human Capital, the intellectual value of the employees in a firm. All intellectual capital first originates as Human Capital. Innovation and process capital represents components of structural capital, elements that show the legal and process value of the company. Innovation capital includes embodied knowledge sets like patents and copyrights. Process capital tends to consist of more intangible elements of a tacit knowledge set which includes process technologies. In other words, structural capital consists of elements with which the firm's members interact to create more knowledge or get the work done. Relational capital is moderated by cultural capital and both of these elements represent the knowledge needed to provide ongoing value-added relations with shareholders.

(Figure 1 source.

=== Key principle ===
The key principle illustrated in Figure 1 is that no element of intellectual capital by itself creates ongoing value for the firm but is value creating only when interacting with other elements of the intellectual capital model. Thus, the true nature of the intellectual capital machine within the firm is dynamic and with reference to measurement issues. Measuring one elements may affect the measurement of another and once measurements are made of the element its magnitude and direction of flow may have already changed. Total knowledge of the intellectual capital system through measurement is impossible.

=== Institutionalisation issues ===
A problem that may result from narrowly defining the knowledge stocks to be measured is that of reification and institutionalisation of such stock. Identifying a set of importance may over-emphasise the real strategic value of the set, especially in times of strategical change. When knowledge stocks are identified and attention given to them their importance may be rectified by those within the firm and results in the development of core rigidities, or strategic commitment, which may stagnate potentially revitalising innovation. Leonard-Barton identified knowledge as one of the most difficult to change. When it is past success and attention, it creates core rigidities. The term she uses to demonstrate the basic principle is a "way of seeing is also a way of not seeing."

== Structuralization assumption ==
The predominance of a structuralization assumption is that all knowledge needs to be structuralized to be valuable to a firm, leading to reification of knowledge as explicit. This assumption treats all knowledge as easily distinguishable from human experience.

=== Lynn's anecdote ===
A woman who had been working in North America for a German company was fired when the firm downsized and moved all its operations back to Germany. Later, the company learned that the woman had been working on strategically important information on the North American market, thus the knowledge this woman had created had been erroneously "let go" in the process of downsizing. The moral of the story espoused by the author was that the company should have structuralized this knowledge so that it could be owned and retained by the firm even after eliminating the woman from its payroll. Why was the woman fired? Surely, the firm should have been more aware of its developing knowledge sets because knowledge sets are the bases from which all intellectual capital emanates. Furthermore, the strategically relevant information is communicable and could have been codified.

=== Issues in managing multiple capital ===
How does the firm manage both its structural capital as product and its human capital as process? If this flip side seems humanistic, it is. The human intellect is the only entity that has the capacity to create new knowledge that has value. Computers may reassemble information into new modes analytically but cannot integrate these into something new. Structuralization of human capital may be only possible and desired when it can be used to further help the development of human capital, as non-contextual data or information, or sold as a product for profit. An important insight is that the firm need not own something outright for it to profit from association. An example of such an intangible tacit knowledge set that the firm could hardly structuralize and yet profits by association is seen in the relational capital created between a sales agent and client.

The move towards structuralization of tacit, experiential knowledge may result in other problems. Attempts to measure knowledge stock may disrupt the very process involved in creating new knowledge stocks. In such attempts, will we have killed the goose to get the golden egg? That is, the very process of measurement may interfere with the process by which knowledge creates value. Thus, firms should also look towards leveraging intellectual capital through "organising" rather than "structuralizaing" their knowledge assets: organising attempts to coordinate the intellectual capital elements such that their interaction increases ongoing value of the firm as a " going concern" rather than simply as an asset on a balance sheet.

Another problem here may be called the "false recipe" syndrome where the metaphor is that of the chef who, unconsciously or otherwise, neglects to communicate subtle but important elements of a recipe. Managers often lose the support of labor in initiating productivity improvement exercise because, rightly or wrongly, they are perceived as designed to put workers out of a job.

== Product and process ==
In managing intellectual capital there are at least two distinct things that are being managed. Figure 2 illustrates these two streams flowing from the development of human capital. (Figure 2 source.)

=== Stock ===
The first is the knowledge stock itself. The most successful examples of managing intellectual capital from the literature are indicative of this type. Because this type represents the structural capital of the "structuralization" assumption, this is not surprising. It is, however, important. Usually these consist of the products of the intellectual capital development process.

=== Work ===
The second thing being managed is the knowledge work itself. This is more difficult to manage than the first because of its intangible nature. Inevitably the knowledge worker will be the best equipped to understand the full requirements of any particular job. In this case, managers must act as facilitators, setting up the structures and process that will help the knowledge worker will be best equipped to understand the full requirements of any particular job. In this case, managers must act as facilitators, setting up the structures and processes that will help the knowledge worker's development and allow for the efficient interaction of human capital with the other elements of the intellectual capital framework.
