= Sexual capital =

Social value from sexual attractiveness

Sexual capital or sexual value (sometimes referred to as erotic capital) is the social power an individual or group accrues as a result of their sexual attractiveness. It enables social mobility independent of class origin because sexual capital is convertible, and may be useful in acquiring other forms of capital, including social capital and economic capital.

== Origins ==
The term erotic capital was first used by British sociologist Catherine Hakim in the early 2000s. Hakim defined it as separate from and building upon French sociologist Pierre Bourdieu's concepts of economic, cultural, and social capital. She says erotic capital is independent of class origin and enables social mobility, and argues that this makes erotic capital socially subversive, which results in the prevailing power structures devaluing and trying to suppress it. In the manosphere, the parallel term sexual market value or its abbreviation SMV is often used.

== Definition ==
=== Economic ===
One economic-related definition is based on the human truth capital theory of Gary Becker, and predicts that people invest rationally in exhibiting their sex appeal when they can expect a return on their investments. He defines this as a form of health capital, which is itself a form of individual capital. Another definition comes from Capital Portfolio Theory, in which Green argues that sexual capital is part of an individual's overall capital portfolio. An individual can transfer their sexual capital to other forms of capital within Capital Portfolio Theory. From an economic perspective, having high sexual capital is advantageous, since it can help an individual in multiple aspects of their lives. For example, multiple studies have shown that increased physical attractiveness is correlated with higher incomes after eliminating other factors.

=== Sociology ===
The sociological definition is based on Bourdieu's idea of fields. This definition builds on Bourdieu's concept of capital. Green defines sexual capital as accruing to an individual or group due to the quality and quantity of attributes that he or she possesses which elicit an erotic response in another, including physical appearance, affect and sociocultural styles. Some of these attributes may be immutable, such as an individual's race or height, while others may be acquired through fitness training, or artificially, through plastic surgery or a makeover, etc. There is no single hegemonic form of erotic (sexual) capital. On the contrary, currencies of capital are quite variable, acquiring a hegemonic status in relation to the erotic preferences of highly specialized social groups that distinguish one sexual field from another. Importantly, this means that erotic capital is best conceived as a property of the field, and not an individual form of capital.

A second definition is developed by Hakim, treating erotic capital as the fourth personal asset. This definition is a multifaceted combination of physical and social attractiveness that goes well beyond sexual attractiveness that is the focus of the 'fields' perspective. Unlike Green's conception of sexual capital, Hakim's erotic capital is an individual capital with no necessary referent to a field.

Extensive supporting evidence for the concept of sexual capital, defined as beauty, physical attractiveness, and good looks, is provided in Daniel Hamermesh's book, Beauty Pays, where he reviews the research evidence on the economic benefits of being attractive in all contexts, including higher education teaching, politics, sales and marketing, and everyday social interaction. Hamermesh assumes these economic benefits must be due to unfair discrimination, a position he takes from Deborah Rhode's book, Beauty Bias, a feminist lawyer's critique of the social benefits that accrue to attractive people, and the disadvantages experienced by unattractive people, most particularly the obese.

== Usage in the manosphere ==
The term SMV, which stands for sexual market value is commonly used in the manosphere, whereby the term was originally coined on PUA (pick-up artist) forums, whereby it migrated to the incelosphere and then the broader manosphere. In the incelosphere, one's sexual market value can be ranked based on one of two scales: either the decile scale which ranks a person, usually a man, on a scale from one to ten, or the PSL scale which is ranked from one to eight. A person ranked as an eight or ten in these scales are dubbed as a Chad or variations thereof, whereas a person ranked in the bottom half of this scale is labelled a sub-5, and a person at the bottom an incel. Raters on these online manosphere or incelosphere platforms utilize the LMS (looks money status) framework, whereby they evaluate the SMV of their subjects by synthesizing each of the three metrics into a single overall rating.

== Main determining factors ==
Catherine Hakim argues that erotic capital matters beyond the sexual field, and beyond private relationships. Her research suggests that erotic capital is important in the fields of media, politics, advertising, sports, the arts, and in everyday social interaction, and consists of six elements:

1. Beauty
2. Sexual attractiveness
3. Social attractiveness ("grace, charm, social skills in interaction, the ability to make people like you, feel at ease and happy, want to know you and, where relevant, desire you")
4. Vivaciousness and energy ("a mixture of physical fitness, social energy, and good humor")
5. Social presentation ("style of dress, face-painting, perfume, jewelry, hairstyles, and the various accessories that people carry or wear to announce their social status and style to the world")
6. Sexuality ("sexual competence, energy, erotic imagination, playfulness, and everything else that makes for a sexually satisfying partner")

Catherine Hakim's theory of erotic capital argues that erotic capital is an important fourth personal asset, alongside economic capital, cultural/human capital and social capital; that erotic capital is increasingly important in affluent modern societies; that women generally have more erotic capital than men, and that erotic capital has social benefits and privileges that benefit the female gender. This definition of erotic capital has been contested by some sociologists who reject the idea that erotic capital / sexual capital is something individuals possess, like a portable portfolio of resources, with no implicit link to the particular sexual field in which such characteristics are deemed desirable.

Sexual capital may be related to both sexual and mental health, as when individuals with low sexual capital show diminished ability to talk about or negotiate condom use with a partner possessing greater erotic capital, and develop negative emotional states as a consequence of feeling unattractive.

In broader theoretical terms, sexual capital is important for social theory insofar as it is one among other types of capital, including social capital, symbolic capital, and cultural capital which influence the status accorded individual members of the larger society. Sexual capital is convertible to other forms of capital, as when actors parlay sexual capital into financial capital or social capital (e.g. Marilyn Monroe), or when attractive employees get raises and social connections from bringing in more customers by virtue of their looks.

== Cultural and contextual factors ==
=== Race ===
Sexual capital is closely associated with race or racial stereotypes of sexual attractiveness.

In the United States, white men have higher sexual capital than white women, Black women, or Black men. This is also observed in other countries, such as in Japan; Japanese men in Japan are stereotyped as controlling, awkward or emasculated, while white women are viewed as mannish or too loud. These stereotypes elevate the sexual capital of Asian women and white men in Japan. Similar patterns have been reported in Taiwan.

Some black men are afforded high sexual status because they appeal to the fantasies of some heterosexual white women, but more generally black men suffer from systemic sexual racism. Susan Koshy argues that Asian women have gained sexual capital in the West through glamorous accounts of western male – Asian female sexual relationships in the media and arts. Sexual racism has also been studied to negatively affect gay men of color. For Asian American men, socioeconomic success does not bring additional dating or marriage opportunities.

=== Culture ===
Idealized traits can vary greatly between cultures, although there are a few beauty standards that are almost universal. Facial symmetry, for example, is a physically-desirable characteristic that is near universal. However, many physical characteristics, like height and weight, have different ideals based on an individual's culture. Not having a culture's desired physical traits can lead to a loss of sexual capital, which would likely decrease an individual's overall capital portfolio. This phenomenon is especially apparent when individuals relocate to an area with different beauty ideals, as there may be a large change in an individual's sexual capital.

=== Religion ===
Sexual capital can be present in both secular and religious settings. Willey has shown that in an Evangelical youth group, sexual and erotic capital still play a role in partner selection. Young adults often find a romantic interest in their church groups, often by choosing a partner who has sought-after traits, or a desirable personal capital portfolio. Within the Evangelical youth groups studied, sexual capital was displayed as virginal capital, in which an individual was considered more romantically desirable by the group when they had not engaged in sexual activity. Additionally, some studies point out how adolescents may reduce their religious involvement around their sexual debut. Pentecostal adolescents in Cape Town were shown to reduce their church attendance in early adulthood, with some resuming their previous attendance after finding a long-term partner. These studies show some of the effects of religion on influencing sexual behavior norms of a community. While limited studies have been conducted on the effects of sexual and erotic capital within other religious communities, much has been written on how religion has shaped human sexuality.

=== Class and gender ===
Scholars suggest that sexual capital is closely tied to social class. According to Christian Groes-Green, a PhD fellow at University of Copenhagen, sexual capital and other forms of bodily power become important resources among disenfranchised young men in Mozambique when their access to economic capital and jobs is diminished. Groes-Green further argues that the emergence of sexual capital is linked to gender relations, e.g. when poor young men build sexual capital by grooming their looks and improving sexual performance in order to satisfy female partners. Per Groes-Green, this puts the young poor men in competition with middle class peers and older so-called "sugar-daddies". Thus, Groes-Green argues that, sexual capital reinforces masculinity in the face of male disempowerment, and it often develops as a response to conflict between hegemonic and subordinated masculinity.

=== Gay sexual capital ===
Riggs has cited several studies of gay men's behavior on Grindr, which showed that white users had received more attention on the app than users who did not identify as white in their biographies. Other studies have shown that men who report a taller than average height, a more muscular body, have more traditionally masculine characteristics, and self-identify as white receive more attention from other members than those who lack these characteristics. Receiving more attention on Grindr, measured by taps or messages from other users, has been used by researchers to find the number of individuals who viewed a profile as sexually desirable. This measure could signify higher levels of sexual capital.

Within the lesbian community, gender nonconformity has been thought to increase an individual's sexual capital. However, the reasons behind this are often the product of society's views on gender nonconformity and lesbianism. Many butch lesbians may have higher sexual capital within lesbian communities, since they actively subvert gender stereotypes, a trait often celebrated within the community. Conversely, femme lesbians may lack sexual capital in queer spaces. However, feminine presenting queer women may receive sexual capital outside of lesbian communities, particularly among heterosexual men.

== Capital portfolios ==
Because desirability in a sexual field may depend on more than merely sexual attractiveness, Green (2014) develops the concept, capital portfolio, to capture the particular combination of capitals that make an individual or group more desirable than others. Capital portfolios typically involve a combination of sexual capital with economic, cultural and social capitals. As an example, to the extent that women, on average, value financial resources (i.e., economic capital) in their male partners more than sexual capital, and men value sexual capital more than economic capital in their female partners, so one may conclude that heterosexual women and men seek out distinctive capital portfolios that include a different, gendered balance of capitals.

== Criticism ==
As sexual capital and related theories by Catherine Hakim have gained public exposure, there has been criticism from several researchers. The arguments have focused largely on how Hakim's theory disproportionately impacts women, even though she considers it a universal theory. Female sexuality varies to a greater extent across culture and socioeconomic status than male sexuality. Women from racial, socioeconomic, sexual, or gender minority groups may face additional pressures in what is considered attractive depending on their environment. Additionally, Hakim's theory of sexual capital, including the idea that an individual can change their level of capital, is limited through these considerations.

While Hakim argues that sexual capital can be exchanged and modified by an individual, this is only possible for the average person in certain sociopolitical contexts. An individual is bounded by their society's views on sex, sexuality and social norms. In some cases, like in a neoliberal secular society, individuals have a wider freedom of choice in how they present their sexuality and eroticism. Bay-Cheng argues that in neoliberal societies, an individual's motivation for their behavior, along with the behavior itself, is used to evaluate their sexual capital.

== See also ==
- Casting couch
- Charismatic authority
- Halo effect
- Lookism
- Incel Justification for beliefs
- Mate value
- Physical attractiveness stereotype
- Sexual economics
- Soft power
- Wanghong economy
