= Sexual attraction =

Attraction on the basis of sexual desire

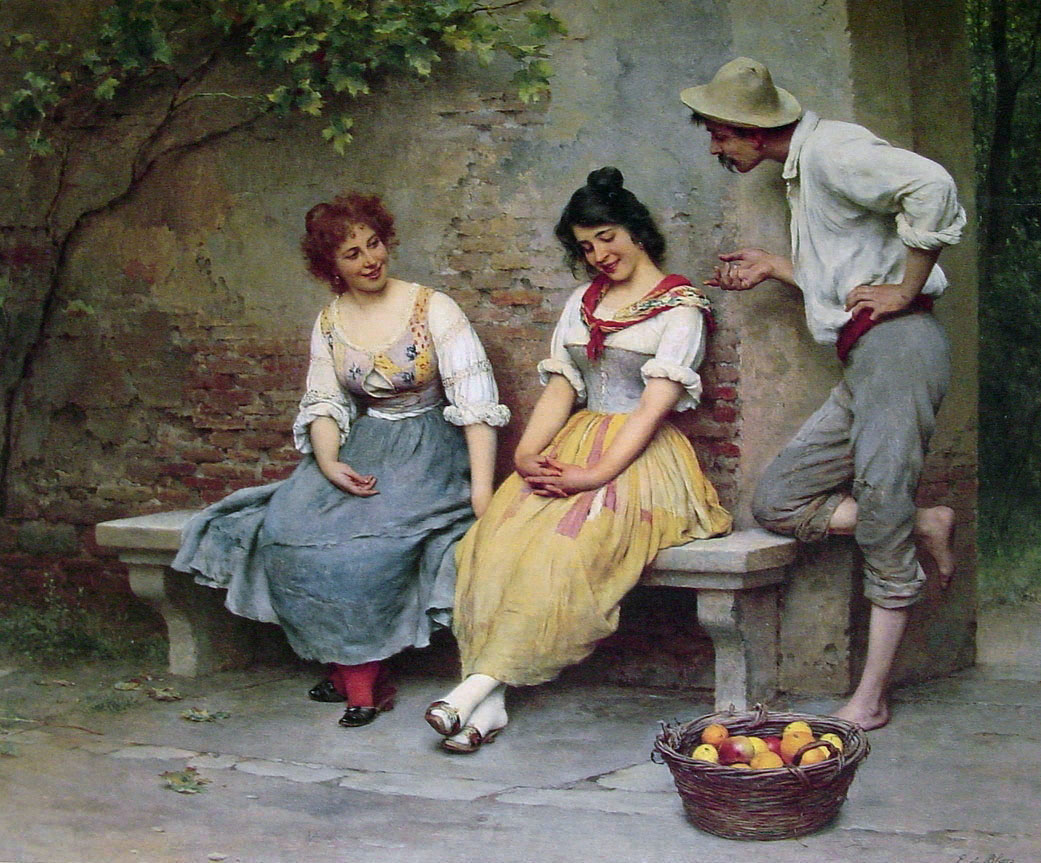
The Flirtation (1904), by Eugene de Blaas

Sexual attraction is attraction on the basis of sexual desire or the quality of arousing such interest. Sexual attractiveness or sex appeal is an individual's ability to attract other people sexually, and is a factor in sexual selection or mate choice. The attraction can be to the physical or other qualities or traits of a person, or to such qualities in the context where they appear. The attraction may be to a person's aesthetics, movements, voice, among other things. The attraction may be enhanced by a person's body odor, sex pheromones, adornments, clothing, perfume or hair style. It can be influenced by individual genetic, psychological, or cultural factors, or to other, more amorphous qualities. Sexual attraction is also a response to another person that depends on a combination of the person possessing the traits and on the criteria of the person who is attracted.

Though attempts have been made to devise objective criteria of sexual attractiveness and measure it as one of several bodily forms of capital asset (e.g. erotic capital), a person's sexual attractiveness is to a large extent a subjective measure dependent on another person's interest, perception, and sexual orientation. For example, a gay or lesbian person would typically find a person of the same sex to be more attractive than one of the other sex. A bisexual person would find either sex to be attractive. Asexuality refers to those who do not experience sexual attraction for either sex, though they may have romantic attraction or a non-directed libido. Interpersonal attraction includes factors such as physical or psychological similarity, familiarity or possessing a preponderance of common or familiar features, similarity, complementarity, reciprocal liking, and reinforcement.

The ability of a person's physical and other qualities to create a sexual interest in others is the basis of their use in advertising, film, and other visual media, as well as in modeling and other occupations. In evolutionary terms, the ovulatory shift hypothesis posits that female humans exhibit different sexual behaviours and desires at points in their menstrual cycle, as a means to ensure that they attract a high quality mate to copulate with during their most fertile time. Hormone levels throughout the menstrual cycle affect a woman's overt behaviours, influencing the way a woman presents herself to others during stages of her menstrual cycle, in an attempt to attract high quality mates the closer the woman is to ovulation.

== Social and biological factors ==
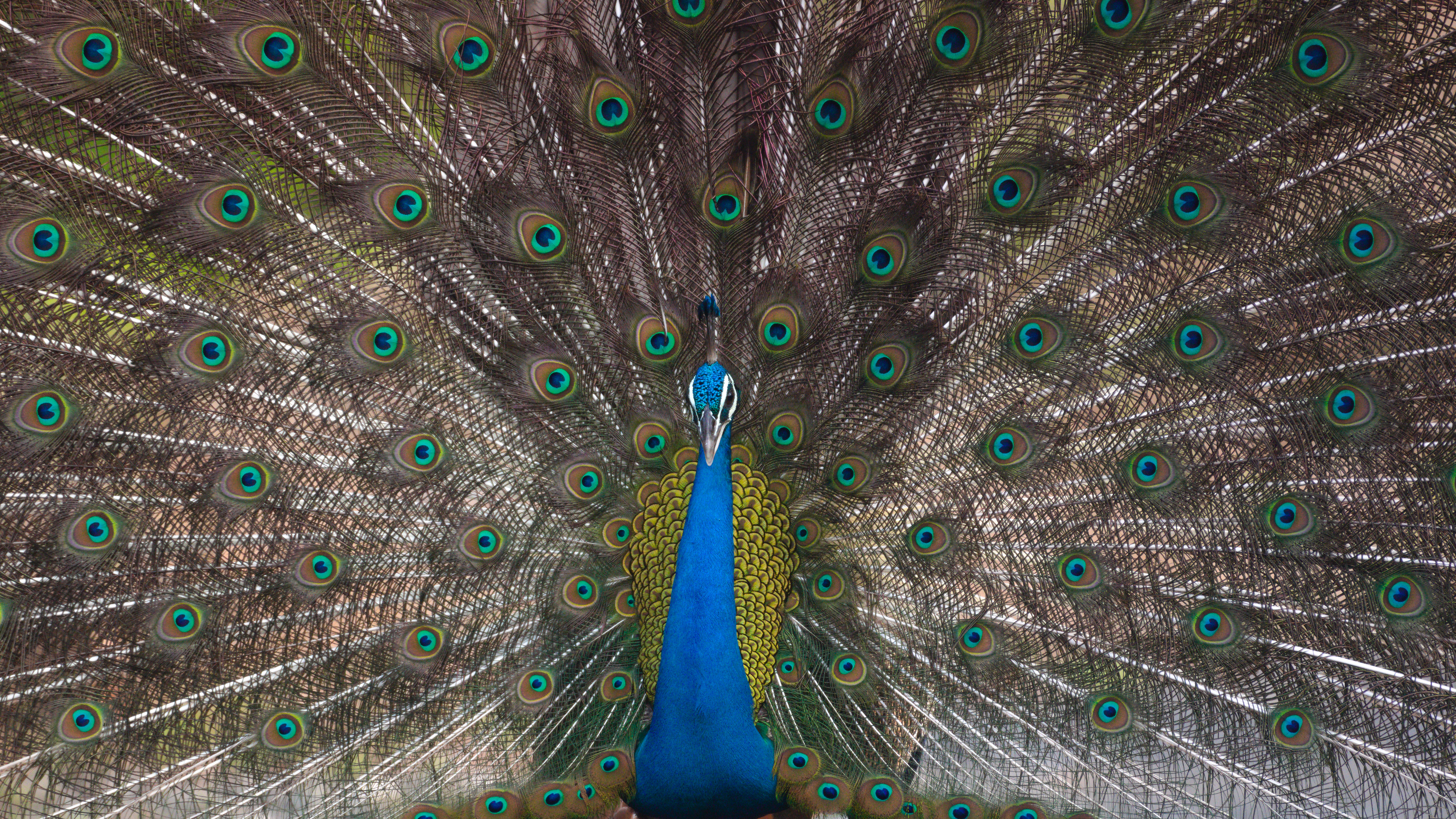
A male peacock attracts females with a courtship display.

Human sexuality has many aspects. In biology, sexuality describes the reproductive mechanism and the basic biological drive that exists in all sexually reproducing species and can encompass sexual intercourse and sexual contact in all its forms. There are also emotional and physical aspects of sexuality. These relate to the bond between individuals, which may be expressed through profound feelings or emotions. Sociologically, it can cover the cultural, political, and legal aspects; philosophically, it can span the moral, ethical, theological, spiritual, and religious aspects.

Which aspects of a person's sexuality attract another is influenced by cultural factors; it has varied over time, as well as personal factors. Influencing factors may be determined more locally among sub-cultures, across sexual fields, or simply by the preferences of the individual. These preferences come about as a result of a complex variety of genetic, psychological, and cultural factors.

A person's physical appearance has a critical impact on their sexual attractiveness. This involves the impact one's appearance has on the senses, especially in the beginning of a relationship, among them:

- Visual perception (the symmetry of the face, physical attractiveness, health, and how they act or move, for example, while dancing);
- Audition (how the other's voice and movements sound);
- Olfaction (how the other smells, naturally or artificially; the wrong smell may be repellent);
- Somatosensory system (for example touch and temperature).

As with other animals, pheromones may have an impact, though less significantly in the case of humans. Theoretically, the "wrong" pheromone may cause someone to be disliked, even when they would otherwise appear attractive. The importance of pheromones in human relationships is probably limited and is widely disputed, although it appears to have some scientific basis.

Some people exhibit high levels of sexual fetishism and are sexually stimulated by other stimuli not normally associated with sexual arousal. The degree to which such fetishism exists or has existed in different cultures is controversial.

Pheromones have been determined to play a role in sexual attraction between people. They influence gonadal hormone secretion, for example, follicle maturation in the ovaries in females and testosterone and sperm production in males.

== Misattribution of arousal ==
The misattribution of arousal is a unconscious, automatic process that can provide an explanation for how arousal influences sexual attraction. It suggests that individuals can associate psychological symptoms (e.g. increased heart rate, adrenaline), or emotions of arousal (e.g. anxiety, fear, panic), with the wrong cause. As a result, individuals may attribute arousal to a person rather than the environment or situation, leading to sexual or romantic attraction. Individuals are more likely to make these misattributions when the source of the physiological arousal is unknown. In addition, the effects of arousal on attraction can depend on the attractiveness of opposite-sex individuals. Arousal can increase attraction to attractive individuals, and it can also decrease attraction to unattractive individuals.

Early research conducted by Donald G. Dutton and Arthur P. Aron in the 1970s aimed to find the relation between sexual attraction and high anxiety conditions. In doing so, 85 male participants were contacted by an attractive female interviewer at either a fear-arousing suspension bridge or a normal bridge. Conclusively, it was shown that the male participants who were asked by the female interviewer to perform the thematic apperception test (TAT) on the fear-arousing bridge, wrote more sexual content in the stories and attempted, with greater effort, to contact the interviewer after the experiment than those participants who performed the TAT on the normal bridge. In another test, a male participant, chosen from a group of 80, was given anticipated shocks. With him was an attractive female confederate, who was also being shocked. The experiment showed that the male's sexual imagery in the TAT was much higher when self shock was anticipated and not when the female confederate shock was anticipated.

== Enhancement ==
The act of changing physical or psychological attractiveness through any means is referred to as enhancement. There are two types of enhancement: conscious enhancement and subconscious enhancement. Conscious enhancement is the act of actively changing oneself in a way to increase one's own sexual attractiveness. Examples of conscious enhancement that can increase attraction include enhancing looks (physique, facial appearance, clothing, jewelry), showing off abilities and talents, demonstrating similarities, or deciding to keep undesirable attributes hidden. Subconscious enhancement is the act of changing oneself to increase sexual attractiveness, often without conscious effort or realization from the individual. Examples of subconscious enhancement can that can increase attraction include altering one's own body language to appear more confident, engaging in skin to skin contact, and displaying consciousness.

The purpose of enhancements can be to bring the target individual into a state of infatuation and create additional opportunities for interaction, sexual attraction, and arousal. However, the strategies themselves often depend on the type of individual someone wishes to attract. Acts of enhancement can also be used to attract someone with whom they can form a deeper relationship, for companionship, procreation, or an intimate relationship.

Enhancement can also improve and speed up the courtship process. This can involve enhancing physical aspects or interactive processes whereby people find and attract potential partners, and maintain a relationship. These processes, can include flirting, which is used to attract the sexual attention of another to encourage romance or sexual relations, and can involve body language, conversation, joking, or brief physical contact.

== Role of substances ==
People choose to partake in substance use in order to enhance sexual attraction and pleasure. Substances have been more commonly used in the last few decades as aphrodisiacs. An aphrodisiac is a food or drug that enhances any sexual pleasure, performance, and desire. These substances provide increased pleasure from sexual activities compared to being in a sober state. The most common substances used are alcohol and cannabis, while others include opioids, cocaine, LSD, etc.

=== Alcohol ===
Alcohol has shown to provide a short-term increase in sex drive among men and women who do not drink in excess. Alcohol at these levels can also slow down the nervous activity in the brain, which in turn leads to more risky sexual behavior. An example of these elevated risky behaviors is an increase in likelihood of intercourse without contraception with strangers. The over consumption of alcohol over time can lead to decreased levels of sexual desire and arousal than normal, erectile dysfunction, infertility, nerve damage. It can also lead to issues with orgasms, either too soon or none at all in both males and females.

=== Cannabis ===
Cannabis has shown to provide users with sexual experience enhancing benefits such as heightened desire, heightened sexual satisfaction, higher intensity of orgasms, more relaxation, more sensitivity to touch, better focus, and reduced anxiety. Some users have found that cannabis had a negative effect on sexual relations such as making them tired or less focused. Cannabis intake before sexual activities can also contribute to other issues such as erectile dysfunction and issues reaching orgasm.

=== Opioids ===
Opioid use such as morphine and heroin can produce feelings of euphoria and relaxation during sexual encounters. Heavy long-term use of opioids can influence the rapid decline of the production of the sex hormones testosterone and estrogen. This results in fewer sperm count, lower libido, erectile dysfunction, and eventual infertility for males. For females, long-term use can result in infertility, decreased sex drive, and issues reaching orgasm. Opioid also causes less physical sensation during sexual activities, resulting in a worse sexual experience.

=== Cocaine ===
Cocaine use when first starting out has an increase in sexual desire and sexual euphoria, but can also lead to erectile dysfunction and premature or delayed orgasm. Chronic use of cocaine has long-term effects such as ovulation failure in women and poor sperm count/motility in men.

== Sex and sexuality differences ==
Men have been found to have a greater interest in uncommitted sex compared to women. Some research shows this interest to be more sociological than biological. Men have a greater interest in visual sexual stimuli than women. However, additional trends have been found with a greater sensitivity to partner status in women choosing a sexual partner and men placing a greater emphasis on physical attractiveness in a potential mate, as well as a significantly greater tendency toward sexual jealousy in men and emotional jealousy in women.

Bailey, Gaulin, Agyei, and Gladue (1994) analyzed whether these results varied according to sexual orientation. In general, they found biological sex played a bigger role in the psychology of sexual attraction than orientation. However, there were some differences between homosexual and heterosexual women and men on these factors. While gay and straight men showed similar psychological interest in casual sex on markers of sociosexuality, gay men showed a larger number of partners in behaviour expressing this interest (proposed to be due to a difference in opportunity). Self-identified lesbian women showed a significantly greater interest in visual sexual stimuli than heterosexual women and judged partner status to be less important in romantic partnerships. Heterosexual men had a significantly greater preference for younger partners than homosexual men. People who identify as asexual may not be sexually attracted to anyone. Gray asexuality includes those who only experience sexual attraction under certain circumstances; for example, exclusively after an emotional bond has been formed. This tends to vary from person to person.

== Sexual attraction within LGBTQ+ ==
A study was conducted to find information on women's first same-sex attraction. Women who experienced same-sex attraction before the age of 10 recall feeling "gut" sensations that revealed to them that they found another woman sexually attractive for the first time. They recall finding their first sexual attractions toward women odd, unnatural, and anxiety inducing. Women also stated that they remembered having these feelings even before knowing terminology for their feelings, which in turn made them feel confused and different from their peers, leading to mental distress. Women who experienced same-sex attraction for the first time around the age of 16 felt a sense of being "late" and felt out of place compared to other women who knew they were attracted to the same sex at a young age. These women reported having same-sex attraction after years of opposite-sex attraction and even feelings of homophobia toward members of the LGBTQ+. Women who experienced this later realization found that it was often due to a friendship slowly turning into a romantic relationship. These women also tended to doubt themselves about whether or not they really were lesbian or counted as such.

Another study was done to investigate the variability in sexual preferences throughout human lifespan. Members of the LGBTQ+ were divided into two groups, either bisexual, or exclusively gay/lesbian. Bisexual individuals were found to not have a stable attraction to the gender that they stated was the one they were least attracted to. They were also found to have instability in and changes over years in terms of their attraction toward their preferred and least preferred genders. Exclusive gay/lesbian individuals were found to have more stable attractions with fewer variability in sexual attractions over many years.

== Sexual preferences and hormones ==
The ovulatory shift hypothesis is the theory that female humans tend to exhibit different sexual behaviours and desires at points in their cycle. Two meta-analyses published in 2014 reached opposing conclusions on whether the existing evidence was robust enough to support the prediction that women's mate preferences change across the cycle. A newer 2018 review does not show women changing the type of men they desire at different times in their fertility cycle.

In males, a masculine face has been positively correlated with fewer respiratory diseases and, as a consequence, masculine features offer a marker of health and reproductive success.

=== Ovulation ===
Hormone levels throughout the menstrual cycle affect a woman's behaviour in preferences and in their overt behaviours. The ornamentation effect is a phenomenon influenced by a stage of the menstrual cycle which refers to the way a woman presents herself to others, in a way to attract potential sexual partners. Studies have found that the closer women were to ovulation, the more provocatively they dress and the more attractive they are rated.

It is possible that women are sensitive to the changes in their physical attractiveness throughout their cycles, such that at their most fertile stages their levels of attractiveness are increased. Consequently, they choose to display their increased levels of attractiveness through this method of ornamentation.

During periods of hormonal imbalance, women exhibit a peak in sexual activity. As these findings have been recorded for female-initiated sexual activity and not for male-initiated activity, the causation appears to be hormonal changes during the menstrual cycle.

Research has also found that menstrual cycles affect sexual behaviour frequency in pre-menopausal women. For example, women who had weekly sexual intercourse with men had menstrual cycles with the average duration of 29 days, while women with less frequent sexual interactions tended to have more extreme cycle lengths. Hormonal contraception can affect the sexual attraction.

=== Male response to ovulation ===
Changes in hormones during a female's cycles affect the way she behaves and the way males behave towards her. Research has found that men are a lot more attentive and loving towards their partners when they are in the most fertile phase of their cycles, in comparison to when they are in the luteal phases. Men become increasingly jealous and possessive over their partners during this stage.

== See also ==
- Body odor and subconscious human sexual attraction
- Erogenous zone
- Evolution of sexual reproduction
- Human height
- Human physical appearance
- Human sexuality
- Interpersonal attraction
- Koinophilia
- Mating system
- Physical attractiveness
- Sex in advertising
- Sex symbol
- Sexual arousal
- Sexual capital
- Sexual dimorphism
- Sexual dimorphism in human bonding
- Sexual field
- Sexual polarity
- Sexual reproduction
- Sexual selection
- Waifu
- Westermarck effect

== Notes ==
- Feinberg DR, Jones BC, Law Smith MJ, et al. (February 2006). "Menstrual cycle, trait estrogen level, and masculinity preferences in the human voice". Horm Behav. 49 (2): 215–22. Bibcode:2006HoBeh..49..215F. doi:10.1016/j.yhbeh.2005.07.004. PMID 16055126. S2CID 14884832.
- On peculiarities of Russian sex appeal, see Draitser, Emil (1999). Making war, not love: Gender and sexuality in Russian humor. New York: St. Martin's Press. pp. 13–32. ISBN 978-0-312-22129-4.
