= Lissack =

Lissack is a surname. Notable people with the surname include:

- Michael Lissack (born 1958), American business executive, author, business consultant
- Morris Lissack (1814–1895), English author, communal worker, and activist
- Russell Lissack, English musician
