= Capital (economics) =

Already-produced durable goods that are used in production of goods or services

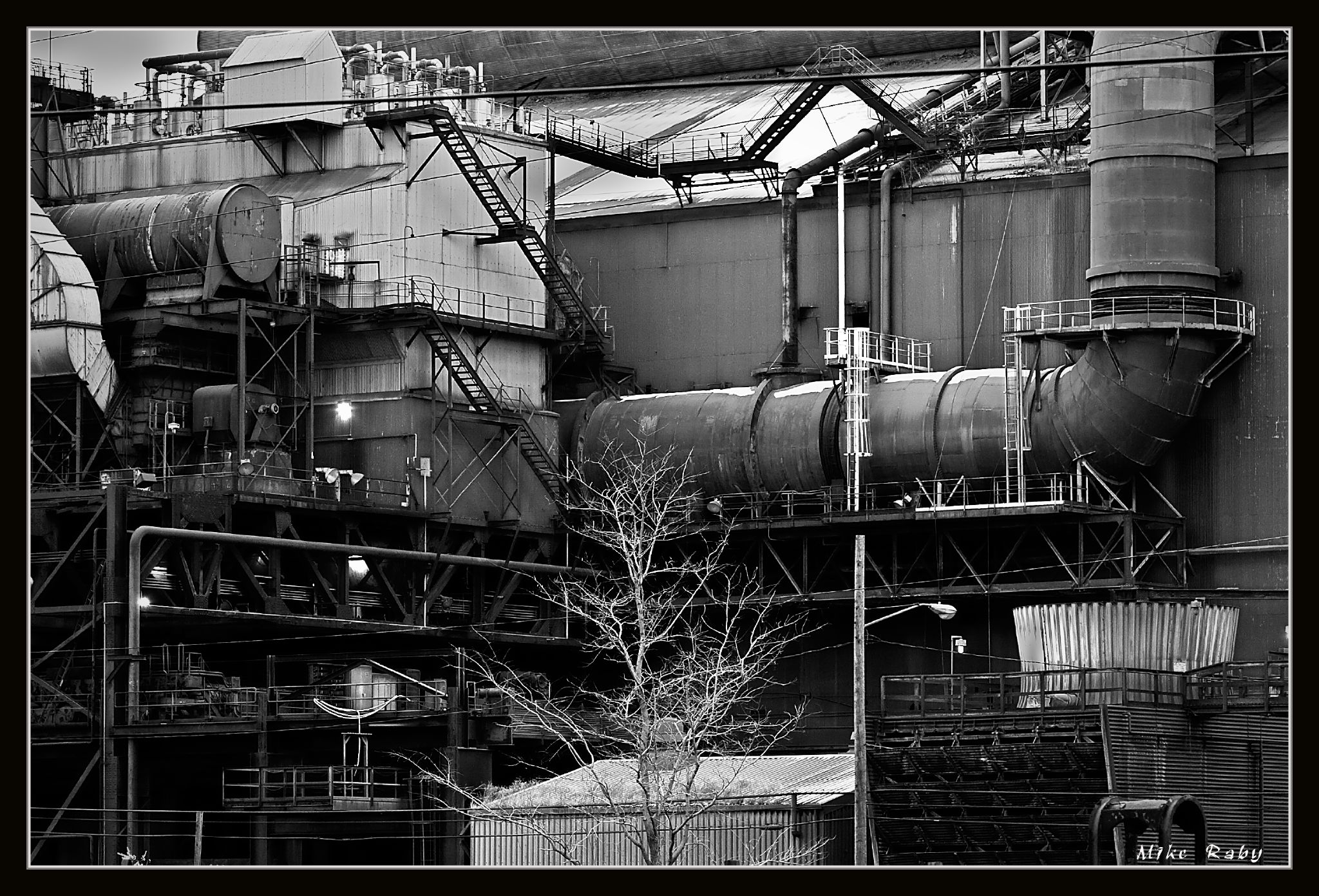
A factory and its equipment are examples of capital goods.

In economics, capital goods or capital are "those durable produced goods that are in turn used as productive inputs for further production" of goods and services. A typical example is the machinery used in a factory. At the macroeconomic level, "the nation's capital stock includes buildings, equipment, software, and inventories during a given year." Capital is a broad economic concept representing produced assets used as inputs for further production or generating income.

What distinguishes capital goods from intermediate goods (e.g., raw materials, components, energy consumed during production) is their durability and the nature of their contribution. Capital provides a flow of productive services over multiple cycles, facilitating production processes repeatedly, rather than being immediately consumed, physically incorporated, or transformed into the final output within a single cycle. While historically often focused on its physical manifestation in physical capital goods, the modern understanding explicitly includes non-physical assets as well. The term "capital equipment" is often used interchangeably with "capital goods", and refers especially to significant, durable items—such as machinery, vehicles, or laboratory instruments—used by organizations to produce goods or deliver services.

Within economics, the capital stock is generally understood as the collection of these produced assets held by an individual, company, or nation at a point in time. This stock comprises both tangible (physical capital) and intangible capital (non-physical capital). Consequently, because these assets are varied in form and function, this stock is inherently heterogeneous. Economists consider capital (often referring implicitly to the services provided by the capital stock) as a factor of production, alongside labor and land (or natural resources). This classification originated during the classical economics period and has remained the dominant method for classification.

Capital as a factor of production represents the produced means of production that contribute to generating output, featuring prominently as an input variable in standard economic production functions such as ${\displaystyle Q=f(L,K)}$ where ${\displaystyle L}$ is a quantity of labor, ${\displaystyle K}$ a quantity of capital and ${\displaystyle Q}$ a rate of output of commodities.

Importantly, while capital serves as a crucial input to the general production process, the creation of new capital goods (such as machinery, buildings, or software) is itself an output of specific production activities, which then enter the capital stock to replace potentially deprecated capital and facilitate future production. Typically, the producers of these capital goods are not the same firms that use them as inputs, but rather specialized firms engaged in capital goods production. However, the precise definition of capital, how to measure it (especially in aggregate), and its exact role and productivity in the production process have been subjects of significant and long-standing debate throughout the history of economic thought.

In Marxian critique of political economy, capital is viewed as a social relation. Critical analysis of the economists portrayal of the capitalist mode of production as a transhistorical state of affairs distinguishes different forms of capital:

- constant capital, which refers to capital goods
- variable capital, which refers to labor-inputs, where the cost is "variable" based on the amount of wages and salaries paid during an employee's contract/employment,
- fictitious capital, which refers to intangible representations or abstractions of physical capital, such as stocks, bonds and securities (or "tradable paper claims to wealth")

== In narrow and broad uses ==
Classical and neoclassical economics describe capital as one of the factors of production (alongside the other factors: land and labour). All other inputs to production are called intangibles in classical economics. This includes organization, entrepreneurship, knowledge, goodwill, or management (which some characterize as talent, social capital or instructional capital).

Many definitions and descriptions of capital goods production have been proposed in the literature. Capital goods are generally considered one-of-a-kind, capital intensive products that consist of many components. They are often used as manufacturing systems or services themselves. Examples include hand tools, machine tools, data centers, oil rigs, semiconductor fabrication plants, and wind turbines. Their production is often organized in projects, with several parties cooperating in networks.

This is what makes it a factor of production:

- The good is not used up immediately in the process of production unlike raw materials or intermediate goods. (The significant exception to this is depreciation allowance, which like intermediate goods, is treated as a business expense.)
- The good can be produced or increased (in contrast to land and non-renewable resources).

These distinctions of convenience have carried over to contemporary economic theory. Adam Smith provided the further clarification that capital is a stock. As such, its value can be estimated at a point in time. By contrast, investment, as production to be added to the capital stock, is described as taking place over time ("per year"), thus a flow.

Earlier illustrations often described capital as physical items, such as tools, buildings, and vehicles that are used in the production process. Since at least the 1960s economists have increasingly focused on broader forms of capital. For example, investment in skills and education can be viewed as building up human capital or knowledge capital, and investments in intellectual property can be viewed as building up intellectual capital. Natural capital is the world's stock of natural resources, which includes geology, soils, air, water and all living organisms. These terms lead to certain questions and controversies discussed in those articles.

A capital good lifecycle typically consists of tendering, engineering and procurement, manufacturing, commissioning, maintenance, and (sometimes) decommissioning.

Capital goods are a major factor in the process of technical innovation:

All innovations—whether they involve the introduction of a new product or provide a cheaper way of producing an existing product—require that the capital goods sector shall produce a new product (machine or physical plant) according to certain specifications.

— Rosenberg, "Article Title", Capital Goods, Technology, and Economic Growth (1963)

Capital goods are a constituent element of the stock of capital assets, or fixed capital and play a key role in the economic analysis of "... growth and production, as well as the distribution of income..."

=== Immaterial capital goods ===
Capital goods can also be immaterial, when they take the form of intellectual property. Many production processes require the intellectual property to (legally) produce their products. Just like material capital goods, they can require substantial investment, and can also be subject to amortization, depreciation, and divestment.

=== Differences from consumer goods ===
People buy capital goods to use as static resources to make other goods, whereas consumer goods are purchased to be consumed.

For example, an automobile is a consumer good when purchased as a private car.

Dump trucks used in manufacturing or construction are capital goods because companies use them to build things like roads, dams, buildings, and bridges.

In the same way, a chocolate bar is a consumer good, but the machines that produce the candy are capital goods.

Some capital goods can be used in both production of consumer goods or production goods, such as machinery for the production of dump trucks.

Consumption is the logical result of all economic activity, but the level of future consumption depends on the future capital stock, and this in turn depends on the current level of production in the capital-goods sector. Hence if there is a desire to increase consumption, the output of the capital goods should be maximized.

=== Importance ===
Capital goods, often called complex products and systems (CoPS), play an important role in today's economy. Aside from allowing a business to create goods or provide services for consumers, capital goods are important in other ways. In an industry where production equipment and materials are quite expensive, they can be a high barrier to entry for new companies. If a new business cannot afford to purchase the machines it needs to create a product, for example, it may not be able to compete as effectively in the market. Such a company might turn to another business to supply its products, but this can be expensive as well. This means that, in industries where the means of production represent a large amount of a business's start-up costs, the number of companies competing in the market is often relatively small.

=== Investment required ===
The acquisition of machinery and other expensive equipment often represents a significant investment for a company. When a business is struggling, it often puts off such purchases as long as possible, since it does not make sense to spend money on equipment if the company is not around to use it. Capital spending can be a sign that a manufacturer expects growth or at least a steady demand for its products, a potentially positive economic sign. In most cases, capital goods require a substantial investment on behalf of the producer, and their purchase is usually referred to as a capital expense. These goods are important to businesses because they use these items to make functional goods for customers or to provide consumers with valuable services. As a result, they are sometimes referred to as producers' goods, production goods, or means of production.

=== In international trade ===
In the theory of international trade, the causes and nature of the trade of capital goods receive little attention. Trade-in capital goods is a crucial part of the dynamic relationship between international trade and development. The production and trade of capital goods, as well as consumer goods, must be introduced to trade models, and the entire analysis integrated with domestic capital accumulation theory.

== Modern types of capital ==
Detailed classifications of capital that have been used in various theoretical or applied uses generally respect the following division:

- Financial capital, which represents obligations, and is liquidated as money for trade, and owned by legal entities. It is in the form of capital assets, traded in financial markets. Its market value is not based on the historical accumulation of money invested but on the perception by the market of its expected revenues and of the risk entailed.
- Social capital, which in private enterprise is partly captured as goodwill or brand value, but is a more general concept of inter-relationships between human beings having money-like value that motivates actions in a similar fashion to paid compensation.
- Instructional capital, defined originally in academia as that aspect of teaching and knowledge transfer that is not inherent in individuals or social relationships but transferable. Various theories use names like knowledge or intellectual capital to describe similar concepts but these are not strictly defined as in the academic definition and have no widely agreed accounting treatment.
- Human capital, a broad term that generally includes social, instructional and individual human talent in combination. It is used in technical economics to define "balanced growth", which is the goal of improving human capital as much as economic capital.
- Public capital is a blanket term that attempts to characterize physical capital that is considered infrastructure and which supports production in unclear or poorly accounted ways. This encompasses the aggregate body of all government-owned assets that are used to promote private industry productivity, including highways, railways, airports, water treatment facilities, telecommunications, electric grids, energy utilities, municipal buildings, public hospitals and schools, police, fire protection, courts and still others. However, it is a problematic term insofar as many of these assets can be either publicly or privately owned.
- Natural or ecological capital is the world's stock of natural resources, which includes geology, soils, air, water and all living organisms. Some natural capital assets provide people with free goods and services, often called ecosystem services. Two of these (clean water and fertile soil) underpin our economy and society and make human life possible.

Separate literatures have developed to describe both natural capital and social capital. Such terms reflect a wide consensus that nature and society both function in such a similar manner as traditional industrial infrastructural capital, that it is entirely appropriate to refer to them as different types of capital in themselves. In particular, they can be used in the production of other goods, are not used up immediately in the process of production, and can be enhanced (if not created) by human effort.

There is also a literature of intellectual capital and intellectual property law. However, this increasingly distinguishes means of capital investment, and collection of potential rewards for patent, copyright (creative or individual capital), and trademark (social trust or social capital) instruments.

Building on Marx, and on the theories of the sociologist and philosopher Pierre Bourdieu, scholars have recently argued for the significance of "culinary capital" in the arena of food. The idea is that the production, consumption, and distribution of knowledge about food can confer power and status.

== Interpretations ==
Within classical economics, Adam Smith (Wealth of Nations, Book II, Chapter 1) distinguished fixed capital from circulating capital. The former designated physical assets not consumed in the production of a product (e.g., machines and storage facilities), while the latter referred to physical assets consumed in the process of production (e.g., raw materials and intermediate products). For an enterprise, both were types of capital.

Economist Henry George argued that financial instruments like stocks, bonds, mortgages, promissory notes, or other certificates for transferring wealth is not really capital, because "Their economic value merely represents the power of one class to appropriate the earnings of another" and "their increase or decrease does not affect the sum of wealth in the community".

Some thinkers, such as Werner Sombart and Max Weber, locate the concept of capital as originating in double-entry bookkeeping, which is thus a foundational innovation in capitalism, Sombart writing in "Medieval and Modern Commercial Enterprise" that:

The very concept of capital is derived from this way of looking at things; one can say that capital, as a category, did not exist before double-entry bookkeeping. Capital can be defined as that amount of wealth which is used in making profits and which enters into the accounts.

Karl Marx adds a distinction that is often confused with David Ricardo's. In Marxian theory, variable capital refers to a capitalist's investment in labor-power, seen as the only source of surplus-value. It is called "variable" since the amount of value it can produce varies from the amount it consumes, i.e., it creates new value. On the other hand, constant capital refers to investment in non-human factors of production, such as plant and machinery, which Marx takes to contribute only its own replacement value to the commodities it is used to produce.

Investment or capital accumulation, in classical economic theory, is the production of increased capital. Investment requires that some goods be produced that are not immediately consumed, but instead used to produce other goods as capital goods. Investment is closely related to saving, though it is not the same. As Keynes pointed out, saving involves not spending all of one's income on current goods or services, while investment refers to spending on a specific type of goods, i.e., capital goods.

Austrian School economist Eugen Boehm von Bawerk maintained that capital intensity was measured by the roundaboutness of production processes. Since capital is defined by him as being goods of higher-order, or goods used to produce consumer goods, and derived their value from them, being future goods.

Human development theory describes human capital as being composed of distinct social, imitative and creative elements:

- Social capital is the value of network trusting relationships between individuals in an economy.
- Individual capital, which is inherent in persons, protected by societies, and trades labour for trust or money. Close parallel concepts are "talent", "ingenuity", "leadership", "trained bodies", or "innate skills" that cannot reliably be reproduced by using any combination of any of the others above. In traditional economic analysis individual capital is more usually called labour.
- Instructional capital in the academic sense is clearly separate from either individual persons or social bonds between them.

This theory is the basis of triple bottom line accounting and is further developed in ecological economics, welfare economics and the various theories of green economics. All of which use a particularly abstract notion of capital in which the requirement of capital being produced like durable goods is effectively removed.

The Cambridge capital controversy was a dispute between economists at Cambridge, Massachusetts based MIT and University of Cambridge in the UK about the measurement of capital. The Cambridge, UK economists, including Joan Robinson and Piero Sraffa claimed that there is no basis for aggregating the heterogeneous objects that constitute 'capital goods.'

Political economists Jonathan Nitzan and Shimshon Bichler have suggested that capital is not a productive entity, but solely financial and that capital values measure the relative power of owners over the broad social processes that bear on profits.

== See also ==
- Capital deepening
- Capital (Marxism)
- Capitalist mode of production (Marxist theory)
- Das Kapital
- DIRTI 5
- Final good
- Means of production
- Organic composition of capital
- Organizational capital
- The Accumulation of Capital
- Physical capital
- Venture capital
- Wealth (economics)
