= Mental capital =

Mental capital means the degree of mastery of life skills at the time an individual faces the choices of life. (Note: Rifka Weehuizen(2008): http://www.merit.unu.edu/training/theses/Thesis_Weehuizen_final.pdf) (Note: UK Government Office for Science(2008): Mental Capital and Well Being: Making the Most of Ourselves in the 21st Century Final Report) (Note: Gary Becker(1965) “A Theory of Allocation of Time” Economic Journal, 75(299) 493-517) This term is first introduced by the economist Lok Sang Ho in his book Principles of Public Policy Practice, (Kluwer Academic Publishers, 2001).

== Summary ==
"Mental capital is related to the concept of psychological capital... In the psychology literature, psychological capital is usually taken to comprise hope, self-efficacy, optimism, and resiliency. These four cornerstones of psychological capital are all attitudinal. Mental capital is not only positive attitudes but also includes certain key skills that allow one to produce such mental goods as self-esteem and sense of achievement, as well as self-reflective skills."(Ho, 2012, p. 44)

Mental capital is also related to the concept of immaterial economic capital, as used in the German Historical tradition of economics ('Geistiges Kapital'). It refers to both individual, social and collective capacities, as well as both actual and historically accumulated immaterial capital. Early German economists who used this concept were e.g. Adam Müller and Friedrich List. Mental capital is related to habit formation. When habit is formed, to the extent that it serves the interest of the individual over the long term, it is mental capital. To the extent that a habit hurts the interest of the individual over the long term, it is negative mental capital. Negative mental capital will take a long time to be transformed because habits are notoriously difficult to break.

== Related publication ==
Since then, much work has been done by psychologists. In 2008, two significant studies on the subject were published, one by the UK Department for Innovation, Business, and Skills through the British Government Office for Science, entitled Mental Capital and Well Being, the other by a doctorate student at the Universitaire Pers Maastricht.

The UK Report defines mental capital as encompassing "a person’s cognitive and emotional resources. It includes their cognitive ability, how flexible and efficient they are at learning, and their 'emotional intelligence', such as their social skills and resilience in the face of stress. It refers to emotional capital (Gendron, 2004, 2011, 2014) and the set of 'emotional competence'. It therefore conditions how well an individual is able to contribute effectively to society, and also to experience a high personal quality of life." Lok Sang Ho sees mental capital as an input into the production of such "mental goods" as sense of security, self-esteem, inner peace, confidence, sense of autonomy, etc. Production of mental goods, like the production of physical "end goods" that enter a person's utility function, is seen to be part of household activity that may include market goods and the time of the person as an input. The latter theory of household production owes to the work of economics Nobel Laureate Gary Becker, particularly his 1965 Economic Journal article.

An updated discussion of positive and negative mental capital is now available in Ho's Economics and Psychology of Happiness: the LIFE framework and sustainable development, published by Routledge 2026.
