= Capital management =

Management of capital assets and investments

Capital management is the area of financial management that deals with capital assets, which are assets that have value as a function of economic production, or otherwise are of utility to other economic assets. Capital management can broadly be divided into two classes:

- Working capital management regards the management of assets that are of capital value to the firm or business entity itself.
- Investment management on the other hand concerns assets that are alternative sources of revenue and normally exist outside of the main revenue model(s) of corporate structures.

The discipline exists because assets that are of capital value to business entities or other legal persons require management to aim to achieve optimal, adequate or otherwise sufficient capital performance of the assets at hand. Underperforming capital assets pose a liability to the finances and continued existence of any legal entity, regardless of whether it is positioned in the public sector or in the private sector.

== See also ==
- Asset management
- Capital budgeting
- Capital structure
- Consulting
- Corporate finance
- Financial capital
- Financial services
- Intellectual capital management
- Liquid capital
