= Edvinsson =

Edvinsson is a surname of Swedish origin. Notable people with the surname include:

- Jan-Åke Edvinsson (1941–2022), Swedish ice hockey administrator
- Leif Edvinsson (born 1946), Swedish organizational theorist
- Simon Edvinsson (born 2003), Swedish ice hockey player
