= Johan Roos =

Swedish organizational theorist (born 1961)

- Born: 1961 (age 64–65); Sweden
- Education: Stockholm School of Economics
- Occupations: Chief Strategy Officer of Hult Business School; Former President of Copenhagen Business School; Former Dean of the Stockholm School of Economics

Johan Roos (born 1961) is a Swedish organizational theorist known for his work on intellectual capital and measuring the intellectual performance of companies as well as being the co-creator of Lego Serious Play. He is Chief Strategy Officer at Hult International Business School, previously having been President of Copenhagen Business School and Dean of the Stockholm School of Economics.

== Biography ==
In 1985 he also received his MSc in Agricultural Business and Management from the Swedish University of Agricultural Sciences, and in 1989 his PhD in International Business from the Stockholm School of Economics.

Roos started his academic career as Research Associate at the Wharton School in 1988. Back in Scandinavia from 1990 to 1994 he was Associate Professor of Strategy at the BI Norwegian Business School. From 1995 to 2000 he was Professor of General Management and Strategy at the International Institute for Management Development (IMD) in Lausanne, Switzerland. In 2000 he founded the Imagination Lab Foundation, which he directed until 2006. In 2007 he returned to Sweden, where he was appointed Professor of Strategy and Dean of the Stockholm School of Economics. After two years as President of Copenhagen Business School from 2009 to 2011, he became Dean & CEO of Jönköping International Business School in 2012.

== Selected publications ==
Roos's books and articles include:

=== Books ===
- Lorange, Peter; Roos, Johan (1992). Strategic alliances: Formation, implementation, and evolution. Oxford: Basil Blackwell. ISBN 9781557861023. OCLC 465091401.
- von Krogh, Georg; Roos, Johan (1995). Organizational Epistemology. New York: St. Martin's Press. ISBN 9780333609873. OCLC 32430062.
- Roos, Johan; Roos, Göran; Dragonetti, Nicola Carlo; Edvinsson, Leif (1997). Intellectual capital: navigating in the new business landscape. Houndmills, Basingstoke, Hampshire: Macmillan Business. ISBN 9780333694794. OCLC 877592412.
- Lissack, Michael; Roos, Johan (1999). The next common sense. Mastering corporate complexity through coherence. London: Nicholas Brealey Pub. ISBN 9781857882407. OCLC 40305541.

=== Articles ===
- von Krogh, Georg; Roos, Johan; Slocum, Ken (Summer 1994). "An essay on corporate epistemology". Strategic Management Journal. 15 (S2): 53–71. doi:10.1002/smj.4250151005.
- Roos, Göran; Roos, Johan (June 1997). "Measuring your company's intellectual performance". Long Range Planning. 30 (3): 413–426. doi:10.1016/S0024-6301(97)90260-0.
