= Human capital =

Economics concept involving knowledge, skills, and training

Human capital or human assets is a concept used by economists to designate personal attributes considered useful in the production process in business or trade. It encompasses employee knowledge, skills, know-how, good health, and education. Human capital has a substantial impact on individual earnings. Research indicates that investments in human capital generate high economic returns throughout childhood and young adulthood.

Companies can invest in human capital; for example, through education and training, improving levels of quality and production.

== History ==
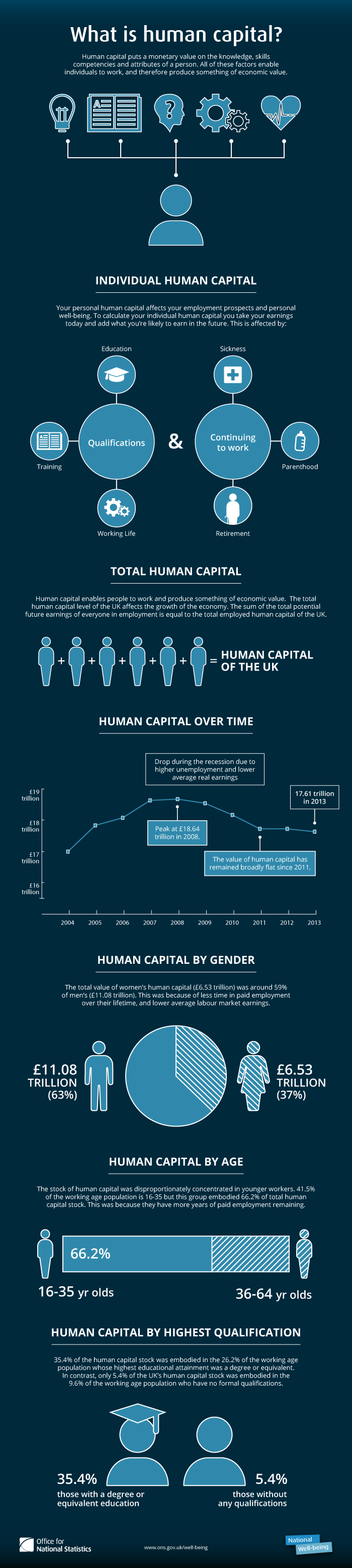
Human capital infographic

Adam Smith included in his definition of capital "the acquired and useful abilities of all the inhabitants or members of the society". The first use of the term "human capital" may be by Irving Fisher. An early discussion with the phrase "human capital" was from Arthur Cecil Pigou:

There is such a thing as investment in human capital as well as investment in material capital. So soon as this is recognised, the distinction between economy in consumption and economy in investment becomes blurred. For, up to a point, consumption is investment in personal productive capacity. This is especially important in connection with children: reducing unduly expenditure on their consumption may greatly lower their efficiency in after-life. Even for adults, after we have descended a certain distance along the scale of wealth, so that we are beyond the region of luxuries and "unnecessary" comforts, a check to personal consumption is also a check to investment.

But the term only found widespread use in economics after its popularization by economists of the Chicago School, in particular Gary Becker, Jacob Mincer, and Theodore Schultz.

The early 20th century Austrian sociologist Rudolf Goldscheid's theory of organic capital and the human economy also served as a precedent for later concepts of human capital.

The use of the term in the modern neoclassical economic literature dates back to Jacob Mincer's article "Investment in Human Capital and Personal Income Distribution" in the Journal of Political Economy in 1958. Then Theodore Schultz also contributed to the development of the subject matter. The best-known application of the idea of "human capital" in economics is that of Mincer and Gary Becker. Becker's book entitled Human Capital, published in 1964, became a standard reference for many years. In this view, human capital is similar to "physical means of production", e.g., factories and machines: one can invest in human capital (via education, training, medical treatment) and one's outputs depend partly on the rate of return on the human capital one owns. Thus, human capital is a means of production, into which additional investment yields additional output. Human capital is substitutable, but not transferable like land, labor, or fixed capital.

Some contemporary growth theories see human capital as an important economic growth factor. Further research shows the relevance of education for the economic welfare of people.

Adam Smith defined four types of fixed capital (which is characterized as that which affords a revenue or profit without circulating or changing masters). The four types were:

1. useful machines, instruments of the trade;
2. buildings as the means of procuring revenue;
3. improvements of land;
4. the acquired and useful abilities of all the inhabitants or members of the society.

Smith defined human capital as follows:

Fourthly, of the acquired and useful abilities of all the inhabitants or members of the society. The acquisition of such talents, by the maintenance of the acquirer during his education, study, or apprenticeship, always costs a real expense, which is a capital fixed and realized, as it were, in his person. Those talents, as they make a part of his fortune, so do they likewise that of the society to which he belongs. The improved dexterity of a workman may be considered in the same light as a machine or instrument of trade which facilitates and abridges labor, and which, though it costs a certain expense, repays that expense with a profit.

Therefore, Smith argued, the productive power of labor are both dependent on the division of labor:

The greatest improvement in the productive powers of labor, and the greater part of the skill, dexterity, and judgement with which it is anywhere directed, or applied, seem to have been the effects of the division of labor.

There is a complex relationship between the division of labor and human capital.

In the 1990s, the concept of human capital was extended to include natural abilities, physical fitness and healthiness, which are crucial for an individual's success in acquiring knowledge and skills.

As a result of his conceptualization and modeling work using Human Capital as a key factor, the 2018 Nobel Prize for Economics was jointly awarded to Paul Romer, who founded the modern innovation-driven approach to understanding economic growth.

In the recent literature, the new concept of task-specific human capital was coined in 2004 by Robert Gibbons, an economist at MIT, and Michael Waldman, an economist at Cornell University. The concept emphasizes that in many cases, human capital is accumulated specific to the nature of the task (or, skills required for the task), and the human capital accumulated for the task are valuable to many firms requiring the transferable skills. This concept can be applied to job-assignment, wage dynamics, tournament, promotion dynamics inside firms, etc.

== Background ==
Human capital in a broad sense is a collection of activities: all the knowledge, skills, abilities, experience, intelligence, training and competences possessed individually and collectively by individuals in a population. These resources are the total capacity of the people that represents a form of wealth that can be directed to accomplish the goals of the nation or state or a portion thereof. The human capital is further distributed into three kinds;

1. Knowledge capital
2. Social capital
3. Emotional capital.

Many theories explicitly connect investment in human capital development to education, and the role of human capital in economic development, productivity growth, and innovation has frequently been cited as a justification for government subsidies for education and job skills training.

It was assumed in early economic theories, reflecting the context – i.e., the secondary sector of the economy was producing much more than the tertiary sector was able to produce at the time in most countries – to be a fungible resource, homogeneous, and easily interchangeable, and it was referred to simply as workforce or labor, one of three factors of production (the others being land, and assumed-interchangeable assets of money and physical equipment). Just as land became recognized as natural capital and an asset in itself, human factors of production were raised from this simple mechanistic analysis to human capital. In modern technical financial analysis, the term "balanced growth" refers to the goal of equal growth of both aggregate human capabilities and physical assets that produce goods and services.

The assumption that labor or workforces could be easily modelled in aggregate began to be challenged in 1950s when the tertiary sector, which demanded creativity, begun to produce more than the secondary sector was producing at the time in the most developed countries in the world.

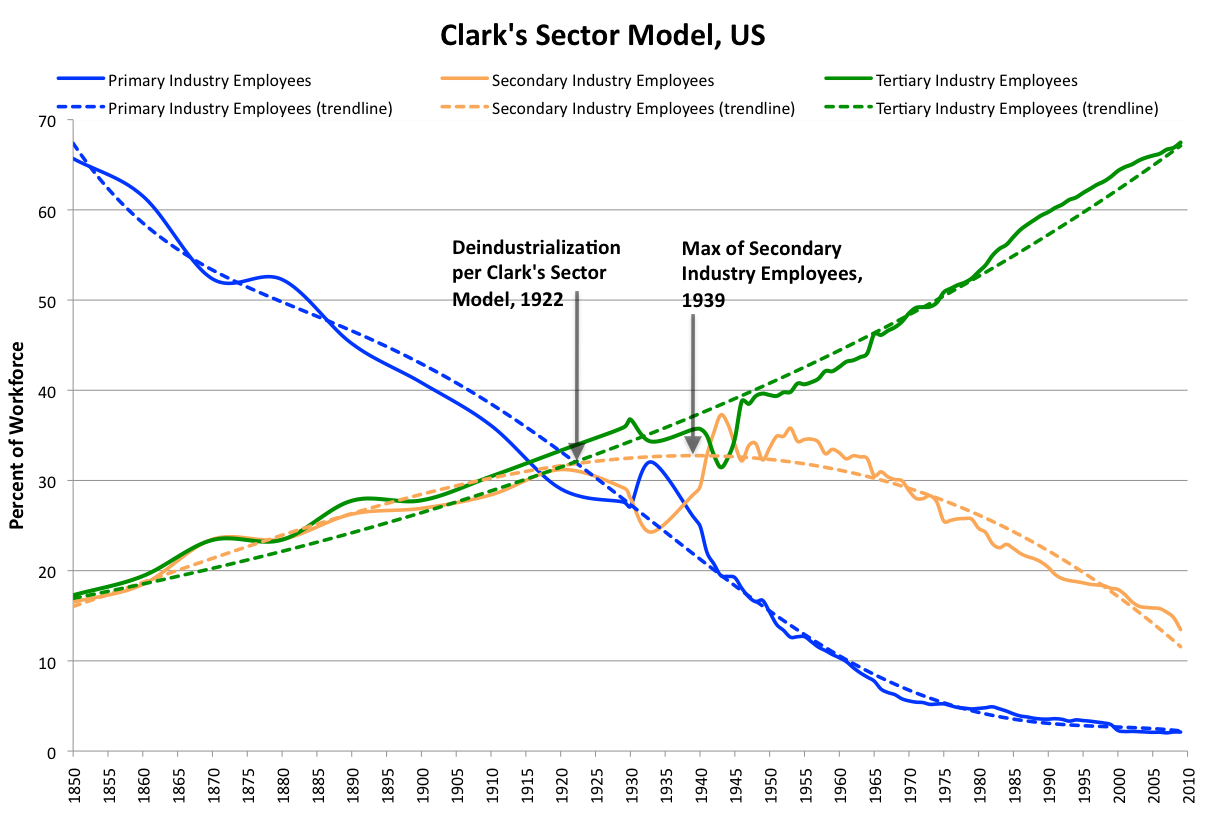
Clark's Sector model the for US economy 1850–2009

Accordingly, much more attention was paid to factors that led to success versus failure where human management was concerned. The role of leadership, talent, even celebrity was explored.

Today, most theories attempt to break down human capital into one or more components for analysis. Most commonly, Emotional capital is the set of resources (the personal and social emotional competencies) that is inherent to the person, useful for personal, professional and organizational development, and participates to social cohesion and has personal, economic and social returns (Gendron, 2004, 2008). Social capital, the sum of social bonds and relationships, has come to be recognized, along with many synonyms such as goodwill or brand value or social cohesion or social resilience and related concepts like celebrity or fame, as distinct from the talent that an individual (such as an athlete has uniquely) has developed that cannot be passed on to others regardless of effort, and those aspects that can be transferred or taught: instructional capital. Less commonly, some analyses conflate good instructions for health with health itself, or good knowledge management habits or systems with the instructions they compile and manage, or the "intellectual capital" of teams – a reflection of their social and instructional capacities, with some assumptions about their individual uniqueness in the context in which they work. In general, these analyses acknowledge that individual trained bodies, teachable ideas or skills, and social influence or persuasion power, are different.

Management accounting is often concerned with questions of how to model human beings as a capital asset. However it is broken down or defined, human capital is vitally important for an organization's success (Crook et al., 2011); human capital increases through education and experience. Human capital is also important for the success of cities and regions: a 2012 study examined how the production of university degrees and R&D activities of educational institutions are related to the human capital of metropolitan areas in which they are located.

In 2010, the OECD encouraged the governments of advanced economies to embrace policies to increase innovation and knowledge in products and services as an economical path to continued prosperity. International policies also often address human capital flight, which is the loss of talented or trained persons from a country that invested in them, to another country which benefits from their arrival without investing in them.

== Measurement of human capital ==
=== World Economic Forum Global Human Capital Index ===
Since 2012 the World Economic Forum has annually published its Global Human Capital Report, which includes the Global Human Capital Index (GHCI). In the 2017 edition, 130 countries are ranked from 0 (worst) to 100 (best) according to the quality of their investments in human capital. Norway is at the top, with 77.12.

=== World Bank Human Capital Index ===
In October 2018, the World Bank published the Human Capital Index (HCI) as a measurement of economic success. The Index ranks countries according to how much is invested in education and health care for young people. The World Bank's 2019 World Development Report on The Changing Nature of Work showcases the Index and explains its importance given the impact of technology on labor markets and the future of work. One of the central innovations of the World Bank Human Capital Index was the inclusion and harmonization of learning data across 164 countries. This introduced a measure of human capital which directly accounts for the knowledge and skills acquired from schooling, rather than using schooling alone, now widely recognized to be an incomplete proxy. The learning outcomes data, methodology, and applications to the human capital literature underlying this effort were published in Nature.

Human Capital Index ranking (top 50 countries)

1. Singapore 0.88
2. South Korea 0.84
3. Japan 0.84
4. Hong Kong, SAR of China 0.82
5. Finland 0.81
6. Ireland 0.81
7. Australia 0.80
8. Sweden 0.80
9. Netherlands 0.80
10. Canada 0.80
11. Germany 0.79
12. Austria 0.79
13. Slovenia 0.79
14. Czech Republic 0.78
15. United Kingdom 0.78
16. Portugal 0.78
17. Denmark 0.77
18. Norway 0.77
19. Italy 0.77
20. Switzerland 0.77
21. New Zealand 0.77
22. France 0.76
23. Israel 0.76
24. United States 0.76
25. Macau, SAR of China 0.76
26. Belgium 0.76
27. Serbia 0.76
28. Cyprus 0.75
29. Estonia 0.75
30. Poland 0.75
31. Kazakhstan 0.75
32. Spain 0.74
33. Iceland 0.74
34. Russia 0.73
35. Latvia 0.72
36. Croatia 0.72
37. Lithuania 0.71
38. Hungary 0.70
39. Malta 0.70
40. Slovakia 0.69
41. Luxembourg 0.69
42. Greece 0.68
43. Seychelles 0.68
44. Bulgaria 0.68
45. Chile 0.67
46. China 0.67
47. Bahrain 0.67
48. Vietnam 0.67
49. United Arab Emirates 0.66
50. Ukraine 0.65

=== Other methods ===
A new measure of expected human capital calculated for 195 countries from 1990 to 2016 and defined for each birth cohort as the expected years lived from age 20 to 64 years and adjusted for educational attainment, learning or education quality, and functional health status was published by The Lancet in September 2018. Finland had the highest level of expected human capital: 28·4 health, education, and learning-adjusted expected years lived between age 20 and 64 years. Niger had the lowest at less than 1·6 years.

Measuring the human capital index of individual firms is also possible: a survey is made on issues like training or compensation, and a value between 0 (worst) and 100 (best) is obtained. Enterprises which rank high are shown to add value to shareholders.

=== Human capital management ===
Human capital management (HCM) is the term used to describe workforce practices and resources that focus on maximizing needed skills through the recruitment, training, and development of employees. Departments and software applications responsible for HCM often manage tasks that include administrative support, reporting and analytics, education and training, and hiring and recruitment.

== Cumulative growth ==
Human capital is distinctly different from the tangible monetary capital due to the extraordinary characteristic of human capital to grow cumulatively over a long period of time. The growth of tangible monetary capital is not always linear due to the shocks of business cycles. During the period of prosperity, monetary capital grows at relatively higher rate while during the period of recession and depression, there is deceleration of monetary capital. On the other hand, human capital has uniformly rising rate of growth over a long period of time because the foundation of this human capital is laid down by the educational and health inputs. The current generation is qualitatively developed by the effective inputs of education and health. The future generation is more benefited by the advanced research in the field of education and health, undertaken by the current generation. Therefore, the educational and health inputs create more productive impacts upon the future generation and the future generation becomes superior to the current generation. In other words, the productive capacity of future generation increases more than that of current generation. Therefore, rate of human capital formation in the future generation happens to be more than the rate of human capital formation in the current generation. This is the cumulative growth of human capital formation generated by superior quality of manpower in the succeeding generation as compared to the preceding generation.

== Intangibility and portability ==
Human capital is an intangible asset, and it is not owned by the firm that employs it and is generally not fungible. Specifically, individuals arrive at 9am and leave at 5pm (in the conventional office model) taking most of their knowledge and relationships with them.

Human capital when viewed from a time perspective consumes time in one of these key activities:

1. Knowledge (activities involving one employee),
2. Collaboration (activities involving more than 1 employee),
3. Processes (activities specifically focused on the knowledge and collaborative activities generated by organizational structure – such as silo impacts, internal politics, etc.) and
4. Absence (annual leave, sick leave, holidays, etc.).

Despite the lack of formal ownership, firms can and do gain from high levels of training, in part because it creates a corporate culture or vocabulary teams use to create cohesion.

In recent economic writings the concept of firm-specific human capital, which includes those social relationships, individual instincts, and instructional details that are of value within one firm (but not in general), appears by way of explaining some labour mobility issues and such phenomena as golden handcuffs. Workers can be more valuable where they are simply for having acquired this knowledge, these skills and these instincts. Accordingly, the firm gains for their unwillingness to leave and market talents elsewhere.

== Marxist analysis ==
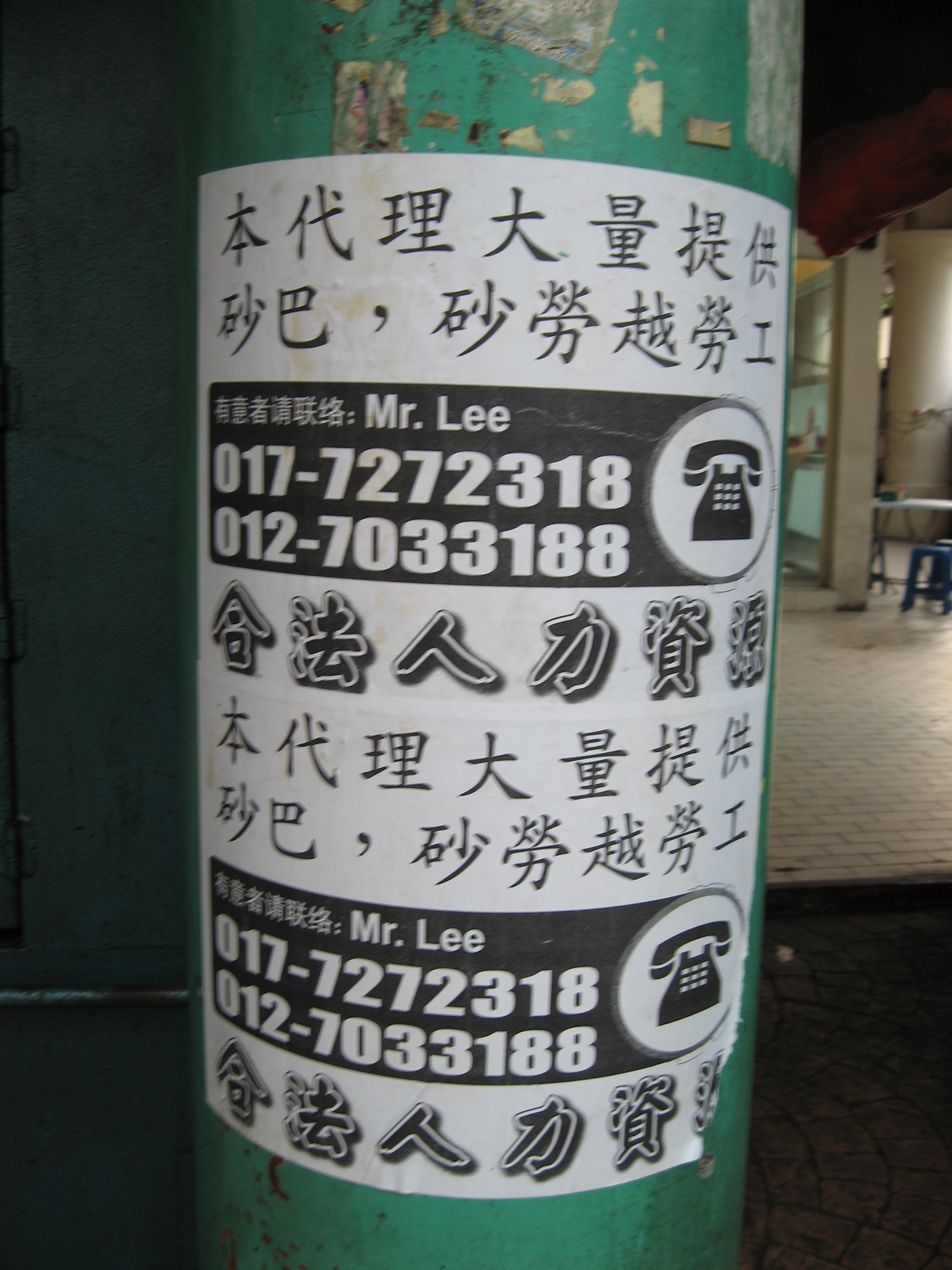
An advertisement for labour from Sabah and Sarawak, seen in Jalan Petaling, Kuala Lumpur

In some way, the idea of "human capital" is similar to Karl Marx's concept of labor power: he thought in capitalism workers sold their labor power in order to receive income (wages and salaries). But long before Mincer or Becker wrote, Marx pointed to "two disagreeably frustrating facts" with theories that equate wages or salaries with the interest on human capital.

1. The worker must actually work, exert their mind and body, to earn this "interest." Marx strongly distinguished between one's capacity to work (labor power) and the activity of working.
2. A free worker cannot sell his human capital in one go; it is far from being a liquid asset, even more illiquid than shares and land. He does not sell his skills, but contracts to utilize those skills, in the same way that an industrialist sells his produce, not his machinery. The exception here are slaves, whose human capital can be sold, though the slave does not earn an income himself.

An employer must be receiving a profit from his operations, so that workers must be producing what Marx described as surplus-value, i.e., doing work beyond that necessary to maintain their labor power. Though having "human capital" gives workers some benefits, they are still dependent on the owners of non-human wealth for their livelihood.

The term appears in Marx's article in the New-York Daily Tribune "The Emancipation Question", January 17 and 22, 1859, although there the term is used to describe humans who act like a capital to the producers, rather than in the modern sense of "knowledge capital" endowed to or acquired by humans.

Neo-Marxist economists have argued that education leads to higher wages not by increasing human capital, but rather by making workers more compliant and reliable in a corporate environment. The reasoning of which being that higher education creates the illusion of a meritocracy, thus justifying economic inequality to the benefit of capitalists, regardless of whether the educated human capital actually provides additional labor value.

== Risk ==
When human capital is assessed by activity-based costing via time allocations it becomes possible to assess human capital risk. Human capital risks can be identified if HR processes in organizations are studied in detail. Human capital risk occurs when the organization operates below attainable operational excellence levels. For example, if a firm could reasonably reduce errors and rework (the process component of human capital) from 10,000 hours per annum to 2,000 hours with attainable technology, the difference of 8,000 hours is human capital risk. When wage costs are applied to this difference (the 8,000 hours) it becomes possible to financially value human capital risk within an organizational perspective.

Risk accumulates in four primary categories:

1. Absence activities (activities related to employees not showing up for work such as sick leave, industrial action, etc.). Unavoidable absence is referred to as Statutory Absence. All other categories of absence are termed "Controllable Absence";
2. Collaborative activities are related to the expenditure of time between more than one employee within an organizational context. Examples include: meetings, phone calls, instructor led training, etc.;
3. Knowledge Activities are related to time expenditures by a single person and include finding/retrieving information, research, email, messaging, blogging, information analysis, etc.; and
4. Process activities are knowledge and collaborative activities that result due to organizational context such as errors/rework, manual data transformation, stress, politics, etc.

== Corporate management ==
In corporate management, human capital is one of the three primary components of intellectual capital (which, in addition to tangible assets, comprise the entire value of a company). Human capital is the value that the employees of a business provide through the application of skills, know-how and expertise. It is an organization's combined human capability for solving business problems. Human capital is inherent in people and cannot be owned by an organization. Therefore, human capital leaves an organization when people leave. Human capital also encompasses how effectively an organization uses its people resources as measured by creativity and innovation. A company's reputation as an employer affects the human capital it draws.

== Criticism ==
Some labor economists have criticized the Chicago-school theory, claiming that it tries to explain all differences in wages and salaries in terms of human capital. One of the leading alternatives, advanced by Michael Spence and Joseph Stiglitz, is "signaling theory". According to signaling theory, education does not lead to increased human capital, but rather acts as a mechanism by which workers with superior innate abilities can signal those abilities to prospective employers and so gain above average wages.

The concept of human capital can be infinitely elastic, including unmeasurable variables such as personal character or connections with insiders (via family or fraternity). This theory has had a significant share of study in the field proving that wages can be higher for employees on aspects other than human capital. Some variables that have been identified in the literature of the past few decades include, gender and nativity wage differentials, discrimination in the work place, and socioeconomic status.

The prestige of a credential may be as important as the knowledge gained in determining the value of an education. This points to the existence of market imperfections such as non-competing groups and labor-market segmentation. In segmented labor markets, the "return on human capital" differs between comparably skilled labor-market groups or segments.

Following Becker, the human capital literature often distinguishes between "specific" and "general" human capital. Specific human capital refers to skills or knowledge that is useful only to a single employer or industry, whereas general human capital (such as literacy) is useful to all employers. Economists view firm-specific human capital as risky, since firm closure or industry decline leads to skills that cannot be transferred (the evidence on the quantitative importance of firm specific capital is unresolved).

Human capital is central to debates about welfare, education, health care, and retirement.

In 2004, "human capital" (German: Humankapital) was named the German Un-Word of the Year by a jury of linguistic scholars, who considered the term inappropriate and inhumane, as individuals would be degraded and their abilities classified according to economically relevant quantities.

"Human capital" is often confused with human development. The UN suggests "Human development denotes both the process of widening people's choices and improving their well-being". The UN Human Development indices suggest that human capital is merely a means to the end of human development: "Theories of human capital formation and human resource development view human beings as means to increased income and wealth rather than as ends. These theories are concerned with human beings as inputs to increasing production".

== See also ==
- Automation – Use of various control systems for operating equipment
- The Birth of Biopolitics – Part of a lecture series by Michel Foucault
- Brain drain – Emigration of well-trained individuals
- Capital (economics) – Already-produced durable goods that are used in production of goods or services
- Capital accumulation – Dynamic that motivates pursuit of profit
- Capitalize or expense
- Cross-cultural capital – Facet of human capital
- Cultural capital – Concept of social status and social mobility
- Rudolf Goldscheid – Austrian sociologist (1870–1931)
- Human Capital Management – Approach to the effective management of people in a company
- Human development theory – Concept in economics
- Human resources – Organization's workforce
- Intellectual capital – Term used in economics
- Intellectual capital management
- Industrial and organizational psychology – Branch of psychology
- Labor power – Capacity to do work in Marxism
- Mincer equation – Equation explaining wages via schooling and experience
- Natural capital – World's stock of natural resources
- Organizational capital
- Overqualification – State of being educated beyond the needs of a particular job
- Relational capital
- Structural capital – Primary component of intellectual capital
- Theodore Schultz – American economist and Nobel Laureate (1902–1998)
- Talent management – Aspect of organizational planning
- True cost accounting – Accounting that measures the hidden impacts of economic activities on the environment
- Working time – Period of time that an individual spends at paid occupational labor
