= Business consultant =

A business consultant (from Latin consultare, "to discuss") is a professional who provides professional or expert advice or service in a particular area such as security (electronic or physical), management, accountancy, law, human resources, marketing (and public relations), financial control, engineering, science, digital transformation, exit planning or any of many other specialized fields.

A consultant is usually an expert or a professional in a specific field and has a wide area of knowledge in a specific subject. Consultants can save their clients time, increase revenue, and maintain resources. The role of a consultant outside the medical sphere (where the term is used specifically for a grade of doctor) can fall under one of two general categories:

- Internal consultant – someone who operates within an organization but is available to be consulted on areas of specialism by other departments or individuals (acting as clients); or
- External consultant – someone who is employed externally (either by a firm or some other agency) and whose expertise is provided on a temporary basis, usually for a fee. As such this type of consultant generally engages with multiple and changing clients.

The overall impact of a consultant is that clients have access to deeper levels of expertise than would be feasible for them to retain in-house, and may purchase only as much service from the outside consultant as desired.

In the United Kingdom between 1992 and 2011, government funding provided via Business Link could be used to enable small businesses to access business consultancy services.

== Research ==
A large-scale survey of business consultancy assignments, reported in 2004, found that repeat business and referrals from third parties were key determinants of consultant appointments.
