= Negative mental capital =

Negative mental capital, like positive mental capital, is related to habit formation. According to Ho(2014) "When a bad habit is formed, it becomes a negative mental capital that keeps undermining our wellbeing, because we would then effectively lose control of ourselves, and succumb to the potentially ruinous inertia that prevents us from reaching greater goals that await us."(p. 35) The reference to "capital" is because like capital in economics, habit formation is a process of accumulation. This process of accumulation leads to entrenched neural pathways that makes breaking a habit very difficult.
