= Intangibles =

Intangibles or intangible may refer to:

- Intangible asset, an asset class used in accounting
- Intellectual capital, the difference in value between tangible assets (physical and financial) and market value
- Intellectual property, a legal concept
- Social capital, the expected collective or economic benefits derived from the preferential treatment and cooperation between individuals and groups
- "Intangibles", an episode of The Good Doctor
