= Yield burning =

Type of financial fraud

Yield burning is a form of financial fraud involving the United States municipal bond market.

== Description ==
Yield burning was a method by which major Wall Street U.S. municipal bond dealers cheated the United States government out of millions of dollars of revenue. The scam was initially exposed by whistleblower Michael Lissack in 1994, and eventually the firms involved settled with the government for $205 million.

The New York Times described the scam as follows:

To refinance their old, expensive debt when interest rates fall, municipalities often sell new bonds and put the proceeds into temporary escrow accounts. By law, those accounts cannot generate a higher rate of interest than the rate on the newly issued bonds; if they do, the excess is considered to be arbitrage profit, and it must be rebated to the Federal Government.

To comply with that law, issuers typically buy a mix of ordinary Treasury securities in the open market or special securities, called slugs, from the Treasury. In yield burning, underwriters sell the issuers Treasury securities at inflated prices, which cuts the yield to levels that appear to meet the escrow requirements but that also generate substantial profits for the underwriters. By some estimates, underwriters may have earned $2 billion to $3 billion of illegal profits from yield burning since the late 1970s.

Lissack's initial whistleblowing and cases did not seem to stop the practice. Yield burning can take multiple forms including the overpricing of securities and providing under market yields on reinvestment contracts. In 2004, the United States Court of Appeals for the Second Circuit described the following:

In the present case, the alleged fraud arises from Sakura's sale of forward supply agreements to municipal bond issuers. Lissack claims that Sakura fraudulently mispriced forward supply agreements by rigging the bidding process for the agreements. According to Lissack, Sakura arranged for noncompetitive bidders to make bids well below market value, thus ensuring that Sakura's similarly below-market-value bid would be selected by the municipalities. The Second Amended Complaint alleges the following conduct:

Sakura and its co-conspirators also corrupted, and conspired to corrupt, the bid selection process by, inter alia, selecting non-competitive bidders to participate in the bid process; communicating "not to exceed" bid amounts to "losing" bidders; selecting fewer than three disinterested bidders to participate in the bid process; providing false or misleading information in order to cause legitimate bidders to submit artificially low bids; diverting portions of anticipated profits to pay off co-conspirators that solicited non-competitive bids or otherwise ensured Sakura's selection as forward supply provider.

Lissack claims that Sakura concealed the sham bidding process from the involved municipalities and made false statements and misrepresentations in writing that the transactions complied with federal law.

By 2005, federal regulators became concerned that the yield burning scandal was having a redux. Some of the concern stemmed from a ruling in Lissack's qui tam case, which held yield burning to be a tax issue and thus exempt from the provisions of the federal False Claims Act. Yield burning was, however, directly covered by the Internal Revenue Code tax whistleblower provisions that took effect in 2007. Several major firms ultimately reached a settlement with the Securities and Exchange Commission and Internal Revenue Service regarding a replay of the bid rigging practices that had been originally exposed by Lissack's qui tam suit (the basis of the 2nd District Court language above). More lawsuits and investigations continue to the present day. In July 2011, JPMorgan Chase became the third major institution (after Bank of America and UBS) to settle with regulators, bringing the total recovered in the present round of activity to nearly $500 million.
