= Relational capital =

Relational capital is one of the three primary components of intellectual capital, and is the value inherent in a company's relationships with its customers, vendors, and other important constituencies. It also includes knowledge, capabilities, procedures and systems which are developed from relationships with external agents.

== Overview ==
Relational capital is defined as all relationships - market relationships, power relationships and cooperation - established between firms, institutions and people, which stem from a strong sense of belonging and a highly developed capacity of cooperation typical of culturally similar people and institutions. Relational dependency may be vertical or horizontal, either up or downstream, shaping different types of cooperative, collaborative or coopetitive mechanisms in different ecosystem. There are major conceptual differences between industrial and regional economists in their views towards relational capital. There have been research studies applying quantitative, empirical, and econometric techniques in an effort to verify the existence of relational capital and its importance to the innovation activity in firms. Proxies are found to represent the channels through which knowledge develops at the local level and therefore indirectly of relational capital.

Leif Edvinsson, Director of Intellectual capital at Skandia, may be considered the father of current thought on Intellectual Capital. Edvinsson and Malone (1997) and Brooking (1996) are pioneers in working with intellectual capital. Customer capital is the strength and loyalty of customer relations. Customer satisfaction, repeat business, financial well-being, and price sensitivity may be used as indicators of customer capital. The notion that customer capital is separate from human and structural capital indicates its central importance to an organization's worth. The relationship with customers is distinct from other relationships either within or outside an organization. Relational Capital or Customer Capital is the strength and loyalty of customer relationships.

== See also ==
- Intellectual capital
- Intellectual capital management
- Structural capital
- Organisational capital
- Social capital
- Social reserves
