= Carolyn Saarni =

Developmental psychologist

- Citizenship: American
- Occupation: Developmental Psychologist

Academic background
- Education: University of California, Berkeley

Carolyn Ingrid Saarni (May 13, 1945 – June 5, 2015) was a developmental psychologist known for groundbreaking research on children's development of emotional competence and emotional self-regulation, and the role of parental influence in emotional socialization. She was a professor in the Department of Counseling at Sonoma State University from 1980 to 2013.

Saarni worked with Michael Lewis in editing a landmark book titled The Socialization of Emotions, which guided research on the development of emotions for decades. She subsequently authored The Development of Emotional Competence, which outlined a theory of emotional competence encompassing eight different skills: awareness of one's own emotion, awareness of others' emotions, ability to use emotional vocabulary, capacity for empathy, ability to cope with stressful situations, emotional communication within relationships, and emotional self-efficacy.

== Biography ==
Saarni was born in Berkeley, California. She attended Berkeley public schools and received her B.A in 1967 from the University of California, Berkeley followed by a MA in 1969, and a Ph.D. in educational psychology in 1971 from the same institution. As a graduate student, Saarni studied cognitive development and its implications for education, with her dissertation titled "Piagetian Operations and Field Independence as Factors in Children's Problem-Solving Performance".

Saarni taught in the Department of Educational Psychology at New York University from 1971 to 1979. While living in New York, Saarni completed a two-year post-doctoral training program in clinical psychology at the Institute for Advanced Study in Rational-Emotive Therapy and began studying emotion as a communicative and expressive psychological phenomenon. Saarni moved back to Berkeley in 1980 to join the faculty of Counseling Psychology at Sonoma State University where she remained throughout her career. In addition to her faculty position, Saarni had a clinical practice in mental health.

== Research ==
Saarni's research on development of emotion understanding and competence was influenced by her clinical expertise and practice. Saarni explored emotion communication in families, starting with attachment relationships that infants develop with their caregivers and examining ways that parents influence their children's emotional development over time. In Saarni's view, emotional competence is developed through environmental influences, which may include growing up in a supportive family where the child can experience a diversity of emotions in a secure space. Rather than being innate, Saarni believed that emotional competence is nurtured and developed through the child's interactions with others, especially family members and peers.

Saarni also explored sociocultural factors that influence how people express emotions, how children come to grasp display rules, and how they learn to monitor and control of their emotional expressions. She considered how people use emotional expressions to form a first impression about a person, e.g., they are a happy person or a sad person, and how they may judge others by the emotional state they are in. Saarni looked at the difficulties associated with reading the emotional state of a person who is crying, as the behavior may mean different things (sadness or admiration or happiness) depending on the situation and culture.

Saarni studied the development of expressive control by exploring how children learn to hide their emotions, such as when they are disappointed by a gift they were given. In one of her studies with 6- to 10-year-old children, Saarni explored when children develop the ability to differentiate between appearance (what emotional expression is visible) and reality (what the person really feels). Saarni also explored whether children would display a positive or negative reaction when they received a wanted or unwanted gift, i.e., monitoring and attempting to regulate their expressive behavior. In the first round, she gave out candy and children had a positive reaction. However, when they were subsequently given baby toys as gifts, older girls were most likely to display a positive emotional expression after receiving the unwanted gift whereas younger boys were most likely to display a negative reaction.

== Books ==
- Lewis, M., & Saarni, C. (Eds.). (1985). The socialization of emotions. Springer
- Saarni, C., & Harris, P. L. (Eds.). (1989). Children's understanding of emotion. Cambridge University Press.
- Lewis, M., & Saarni, C. (Eds.). (1993). Lying and deception in everyday life. Guilford Press.
- Saarni, C. (1999). The development of emotional competence. Guilford Press.

== Representative papers ==
- Saarni, C. (1979). Children's understanding of display rules for expressive behavior. Developmental Psychology, 15(4), 424-429.
- Saarni, C. (1984). An observational study of children's attempts to monitor their expressive behavior. Child Development, 55(4), 1504-1513.
- Saarni, C. (1988). Children's understanding of the interpersonal consequences of dissemblance of nonverbal emotional-expressive behavior. Journal of Nonverbal Behavior, 12(4), 275-294.
- Saarni, C. (1997). Coping with aversive feelings. Motivation and Emotion, 21(1), 45-63.
- Saarni, C. (1998). Issues of cultural meaningfulness in emotional development. Developmental Psychology, 34(4), 647–652.
- Saarni, C., & Buckley, M. (2002). Children's understanding of emotion communication in families. Marriage & Family Review, 34(3-4), 213-242.
