= Intellectual capital management =

Intellectual capital is the sum of all knowledge; implying that knowledge that exists at different levels both within or outside the organisation has to be taken into account for intellectual capital. The intangible nature of many knowledge products and processes, in combination with the increasing importance of their value in corporate balance sheets leads to a growing interest in management of intellectual capital. Creating, shaping and updating the stock of intellectual capital requires the formulation of a strategic vision, which blends together all three dimensions of intellectual capital (Human, Structural and Relational Capital) within the organisational context through exploration and exploitation, measurement and disclosure. Therefore, the organisational value of intellectual capital is developed via an ongoing and emergent process focused on the capability to leverage, develop and change the dimensions. The management of intellectual capital is conceptualised as occurring via a multiple stage process, governed by an evolutionary logic. The intellectual capital management is defined as a cycle of four inter-related sets of practices: Strategic Alignment, Exploration and Exploitation, Measurement and Reporting of intellectual capitals.

However, an extensive literature has found that one of the main risks for intellectual capital comes from inside the organizations. Employees have access to organizations’ confidential information and key technology and therefore tend to add risks if Procedural information security countermeasures (PCM) are not taken care of adequately. An example of good measure for robust intellectual capital management that could decrease insider risk is setting up education, training and awareness (SETA) programs.

Intellectual capital plays an important role in generating value for companies, as well as for the global economy. With the understanding of the value of the intellectual capital, companies have developed completely new ways to manage existing knowledge. This has many strategic implications for organizations business operations. The strategic role of the intellectual assets is therefore constantly growing and organizations are looking for more effective intellectual capital management practices. Because of importance of intellectual capital, nowadays we are talking about knowledge workers who are constantly modifying, utilizing and creating new knowledge to add value to the operations of companies. Therefore, it can be said that the management of intellectual capital is a significant factor in organizations value creation. Sometimes intellectual capital is also associated with the term knowledge management. Researches have tried to find out the connection between these terms.

== See also ==
- Capital management
- Intellectual capital
- Structural capital
- Human capital
- Relational capital
- Knowledge Management
- Knowledge worker
