= Peter Lorange =

Norwegian economist

Peter Lorange (born 17 April 1943) is a Norwegian economist. He was the owner, President, and CEO of the Lorange Institute of Business Zürich, formerly known as GSBA Zurich, which he bought in July 2009.

Peter Lorange has previously been President of the International Institute for Management Development (IMD) from 1993 and Rector of the BI Norwegian Business School. He has taught at the Wharton School, University of Pennsylvania and at the MIT Sloan School of Management.

He recently founded the Lorange Network, a learning and sharing platform for family office principals and family business owners.

Lorange received his undergraduate education from the Norwegian School of Economics in 1966, was awarded an MA degree in operations management from Yale University in 1967, and his Doctor of Business Administration degree from Harvard University (1972).

== Selected publications ==
- Lorange, Peter, and Johan Roos. Strategic alliances: Formation, implementation, and evolution. (1993).
