= Morris Lissack =

English-Jewish author, communal worker, and activist

- Born: 1814; Schwerin-on-the-Wartha, Duchy of Warsaw
- Died: January 13, 1895 (aged 80–81); London, United Kingdom

Morris Lissack (1814 – January 13, 1895) was an English author, communal worker, and activist.

== Biography ==
Morris Lissack was born into a Jewish family in Schwerin-on-the-Wartha in 1814. He emigrated to England in 1835, initially working as a pedlar in London. In 1839 settled as a language teacher and jewelry dealer in Bedford, where he lived for nearly fifty years.

In 1851 he published a book entitled Jewish Perseverance, or The Jew at Home and Abroad, an autobiography interwoven with pious meditations and moral reflections. In Bedford, Lissack became a trustee of the Harpur Charity, and through his position secured concessions benefiting Jewish pupils. He was also an active worker in the cause of Jewish emancipation.
