= Michael Waldman (economist) =

American economist and academic (born 1955)

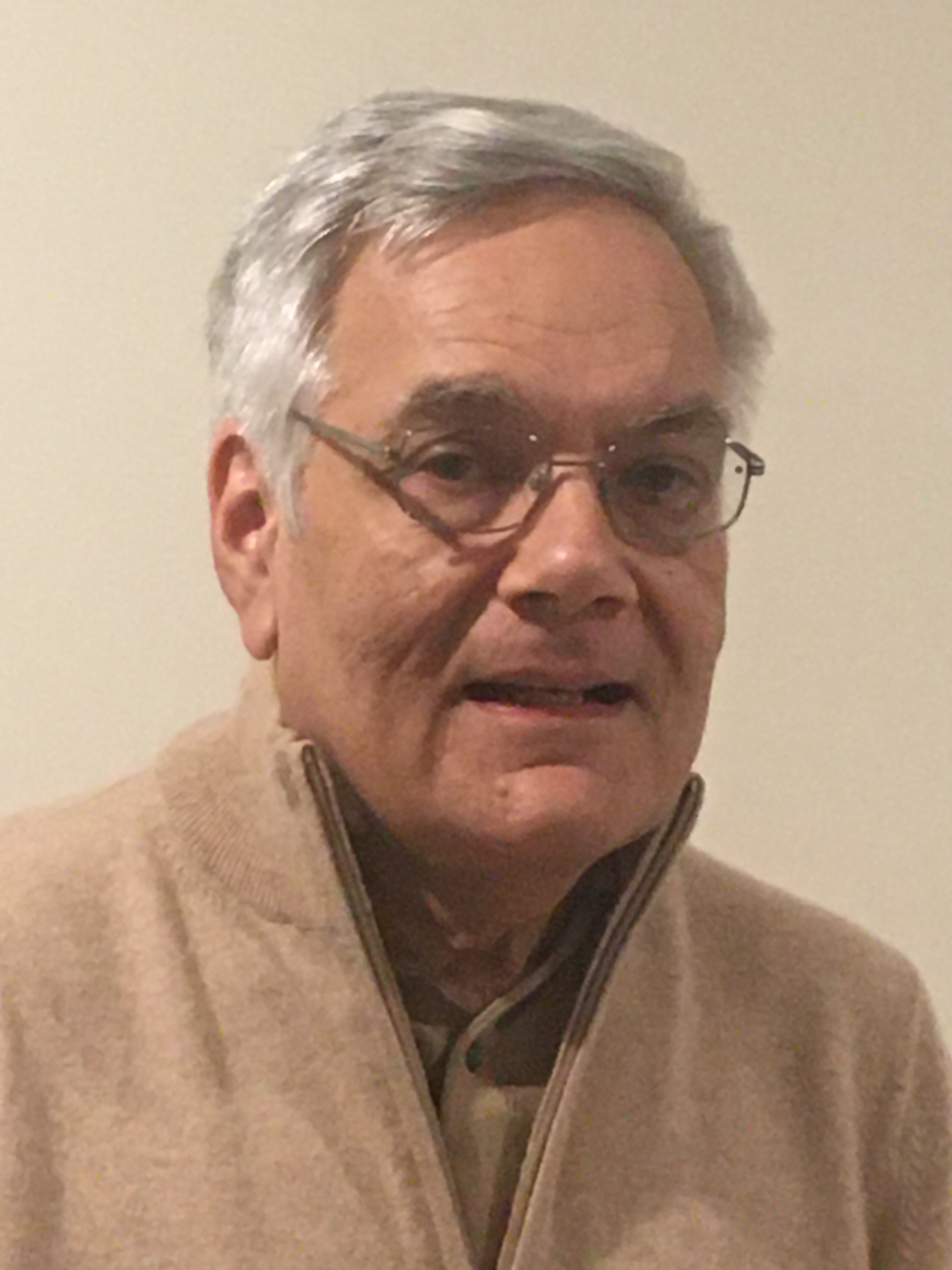
- Born: May 12, 1955 (age 71); America
- Occupations: Economist, academic and researcher
- Title: Charles H. Dyson Professor in Management
- Awards: Warren C. Scoville Distinguished Teaching Award, University of California, Los Angeles

Academic background
- Education: B.Sc., Economics; Ph.D., Economics
- Alma mater: Massachusetts Institute of Technology; University of Pennsylvania

Academic work
- Institutions: Samuel Curtis Johnson Graduate School of Management, Cornell University

Michael Waldman (born May 12, 1955) is an American economist, academic and researcher. He is the Charles H. Dyson Professor in Management and Professor of Economics at Cornell University’s Samuel Curtis Johnson Graduate School of Management.

Waldman has conducted research in applied microeconomic theory, specializing in industrial organization, labor economics, and organizational economics. His work has been focused on learning and signaling in labor markets, the operation of durable goods markets, and the strategic use of tying and bundling in product markets.

== Education ==
Waldman completed his Bachelor of Science in economics from the Massachusetts Institute of Technology in 1977 and his Doctorate studies in economics from the University of Pennsylvania in 1982.

== Career ==
Waldman completed his post-doctoral fellowship from the University of California, Los Angeles before being appointed by the university as an assistant professor of economics in 1983. He was promoted to associate professor in 1989. In 1991, Waldman joined the Johnson Graduate School of Management at Cornell University as a professor of Economics and in 1997, he became the Charles H. Dyson Professor in Management at the university.

Waldman was appointed as visiting professor of Economics and the John M. Olin Visiting professor at the Graduate School of Business and the George J. Stigler Center for the Study of the Economy and the State from 1997 till 1999.

Waldman directed the Institute for the Advancement of Economics at Cornell University from 2008 till 2012. He served as a Co-Editor at the Journal of Economic Perspectives from 2000 till 2006, Associate Editor at the Quarterly Journal of Economics from 2000 till 2014, and as an Editor for the Journal of Labor Economics from 2009 till 2019.

== Research ==
Waldman's research encompasses the areas of industrial organization, labor economics, and organizational economics. He is best known for his work on learning and signaling in labor markets, the operation of durable goods markets, and the strategic use of tying and bundling in product markets. Waldman has also conducted research on the role of expectational shocks in business cycle fluctuations, the role of tied transfers in family and government decision making, how the theory of natural selection can explain systematic errors in decision making, and the ramifications of limitedly rational behavior for market outcomes.

=== Labor markets ===
Waldman's best-known work in the labor area is his research concerning promotion signaling and asymmetric learning. His idea is that a worker's current employer has private information about the worker, with the result that a promotion serves as a positive signal to prospective employers of the worker's ability. In addition to developing the theory in an early 1980s paper, in a paper in the 2010s he developed testable implications and then used data from a US financial services firm to show empirical support for the theory.

In 1999 and 2006, Waldman published a pair of papers that developed a theory of internal labor markets that combines job ladders, symmetric learning, and human capital accumulation. The papers showed that this single theory can explain numerous empirical findings in the empirical literature on internal labor markets. In a related paper published in the early 2000s, he coined the term task-specific human capital, which captures a worker's skill level at accomplishing particular tasks, and argued that this way of categorizing human capital is potentially as important as the classic categories of general and firm specific due initially to Gary Becker.

In the 2010s, Waldman conducted research on the dual avenues of labor market signaling. He explored the interaction between education and promotion signaling, arguably the two main avenues through which worker ability is signaled in the labor market. Focusing on this interaction, he shows that a previously neglected return to education signaling is increased promotion probabilities late in workers’ careers. He argues that this theoretical finding potentially has important ramifications for empirically measuring the returns to educations signaling, which is an important focus of the education signaling literature.

=== Industrial organization ===
In a pair of papers published in the 1990s, Waldman showed how planned obsolescence can arise in monopoly durable goods markets due to a time inconsistency problem associated with new product introductions. In another pair of papers published in the 1990s he investigated substitutability between new and used units, and showed that such substitutability can lead to suboptimal durability and to leasing being used to eliminate secondhand markets.

In a paper published in the early 2000s, he investigated the use of tying of complementary products in the preservation and extension of monopoly positions, and also discussed anti-trust implications. The theory developed in this paper is relevant for understanding Microsoft's behavior in the 1990s concerning Windows and Internet Explorer, which was the focus of an important 2001 American antitrust lawsuit.

=== Limited rationality and the strategic environment ===
In the 1980s, Waldman conducted research on the ramifications of heterogeneous information-processing abilities for equilibrium behavior, including for macroeconomic models characterized by strategic complements. Waldman found that, given strategic substitutes, the rational or sophisticated agents have a disproportionate impact on equilibrium behavior. But, given strategic complements, it is the limitedly rational or naïve agents who are disproportionately important. Further, he shows that this result can serve as a contributing factor to the persistence of macroeconomic shocks if the macroeconomy is characterized by strategic complements.

A number of papers in the experimental literature have subsequently found results consistent with these theoretical findings. In a 2017 paper Waldman extends the theory and experimental literatures on this topic by adding real world complications such as multiple shocks and the periodic introduction of inexperienced players. Consistent with the theoretical framework, the experimental evidence indicates that the rational actor model predicts behavior well given strategic substitutes, but does not given strategic complements.

=== Early childhood electronic screen viewing and autism ===
Waldman investigated whether the growth in autism diagnosis rates over time can be explained by the existence of an environmental trigger, where exposure to genetically vulnerable children has grown over time. He conducted an empirical investigation of autism diagnosis rates in California, Oregon, and Washington counties focused on children born between 1987 and 1999. The findings suggest the presence of an important environmental trigger for autism, where exposure of genetically vulnerable children to the trigger is positively associated with precipitation.

In related research Waldman focused on whether the specific trigger is early childhood electronic screen viewing such as television watching. In addition to conducting research concerning precipitation, here he focused on the correlation between cable television subscription rates in a county and autism diagnosis rates at the county cohort level. The main finding is that a cohort's autism diagnosis rate is positively correlated with the cable television subscription rate when the cohort was under age three. This result is consistent with early childhood electronic screen viewing being an important environmental trigger for autism. In a follow-up study, he investigated both positive and negative mental health consequences of early childhood television viewing using a similar research design, and found no evidence of any positive effects. The follow-up study serves to rule out diagnosis substitution as a possible explanation for the positive correlation between cable television subscription rates and autism diagnosis rates.

== Awards and honors ==
- 2008 – Robert F. Lanzillotti Prize for the Best Paper in Antitrust Economics
- 2019 – Weatherall Distinguished Fellow, Queens University

In 2019, Waldman was a keynote speaker at a labor economics conference held in his honor in Tokyo.

== Bibliography ==
=== Books ===
- Pricing Tactics, Strategies, and Outcomes (2007) ISBN 978-1-84542-476-3
- Learning in Labour Markets (2017) ISBN 978-1-78643-122-6

=== Selected articles ===
- "A Theory of Wage and Promotion Dynamics Inside Firms," Quarterly Journal of Economics, 114, November 1999, pp. 1321–1358 (co-authored with Robert Gibbons).
- "The Strategic Use of Tying to Preserve and Create Market Power in Evolving Industries," RAND Journal of Economics, 33, Summer 2002, pp. 194–220 (co-authored with Dennis W. Carlton).
- "Rational Expectations and the Limits of Rationality: An Analysis of Heterogeneity," American Economic Review, 75, June 1985, pp. 326–340 (co-authored with John Haltiwanger).
- "Task-Specific Human Capital," American Economic Review, Papers and Proceedings, 94, May 2004, pp. 203–207 (co-authored with Robert Gibbons).
- "Job Assignments, Signalling, and Efficiency," RAND Journal of Economics, 15, Summer 1984, pp. 255–267.
- "Durable Goods Theory for Real World Markets," Journal of Economic Perspectives, 17, Winter 2003, pp. 131–154.
- "Autism Prevalence and Precipitation Rates in California, Oregon, and Washington Counties," Archives of Pediatrics & Adolescent Medicine, 162, November 2008, pp. 1026–1034 (co-authored with Sean Nicholson, Nodir Adilov, and John Williams).
