= Sexual field =

Arena of social life where individuals seek intimate partners

A sexual field is an arena of social life wherein individuals seek intimate partners and vie for sexual status. Sexual fields emerge "when a subset of actors with potential romantic or sexual interest orient themselves toward one another according to a logic of desirability imminent to their collective relations and this logic produces, to greater and lesser degrees, a system of stratification" (Green 2014:27). The term builds on Pierre Bourdieu's (1980) concept of field and has been defined as a "set of interlocking institutions" (Martin and George 2006) and an "institutionalized matrix of relations" (Green 2005, 2008, 2011) that confers status upon sexual actors based on individual variation in sexual capital. Relative to those with a sexual capital deficit, actors in possession of sexual capital reap the rewards of the sexual field—including the ability to select desired sexual partners and the acquisition of social significance.

Sexual fields are themselves distinguished by distinct "currencies of erotic capital" (Green 2005, 2008), the latter which are quite variable, acquiring dominance in relation to the collective preferences of players. For example, Green (2005, 2008) argues that the characteristics which confer sexual capital in one field may not in another. Thus, in a gay leather bar, a bearded, stocky white man in his late-thirties dressed in Levi's jeans and a leather jacket will possess an optimal form of sexual capital, whereas the same man in a swanky Martini bar catering to a twenty-something, high-fashion, urban gay customer base will face a sexual capital deficit. This variation in power and status occurs because a gay leather bar and a gay Martini bar are physical sites organized by the logic of two distinct sexual fields with contrasting currencies of sexual capital (Green 2005, 2008)—i.e., distinct "hegemonic systems of judgment" (Martin and George 2006).

For sociological theory, the study of the sexual field in the sexual fields framework offers a framework for analyzing how collective attributions of desire and desirability are shaped by the sexual field itself. That is, rather than see desire and desirability as a simple function of individual wants and judgments, the sexual fields framework suggests that such wants and judgments are the consequence of sexual social life. In this approach, the sexual field acts back on what we find desirable such that desires and desirability are regarded as field effects (Green 2014).

To the extent that sexual stratification is related to but not isomorphic with the structure of alternative fields, so the study of sexual fields cannot be subsumed to the study of an economic or political field, for example. Nevertheless, to the extent that race, class, gender, ethnicity, age and ability, among others, are organizing features of sexual status within a given sexual field, so the relationship of sexual fields to broader historical systems of stratification requires consideration (Green 2005, 2008, 2011. 2014).

== See also ==
- Field (Bourdieu)
