= Structural capital =

Primary component of intellectual capital

Structural capital is one of the three primary components of intellectual capital, and consists of the supportive infrastructure, processes, and databases of the organisation that enable human capital to function. Structural capital is owned by an organization and remains with an organization even when people leave. It includes: capabilities, routines, methods, procedures and methodologies embedded in organisation.

Structural capital is the supportive non-physical infrastructure that enables human capital to function.

There are three subcomponents that comprise structural capital:

Organizational capital includes the organization philosophy and systems for leveraging the organization’s capability.

Process capital includes the techniques, procedures, and programs that implement and enhance the delivery of goods and services.

Innovation capital includes intellectual property and certain other intangible assets. Intellectual property includes protected commercial rights such as patents, copyrights and trademarks. Intangible assets are all of the other talents and theory by which an organization is run.

== See also ==
- Intellectual capital
- Intellectual capital management
- Human capital
- Relational capital
- Organizational capital
