= Michael Lissack =

American businessman

- Born: 1958 (age 67–68); United States
- Occupations: Business executive, author
- Known for: Whistleblower who exposed a yield burning scandal in the 1990s

Michael Lissack (born 1958) is an American business executive, author, business consultant and former director of the Institute for the Study of Coherence and Emergence. In 2019 Lissack was inducted into the International Academy for Systems and Cybernetic Sciences.

Lissack was managing director in the municipal bond department at Smith Barney, and came into prominence as the whistleblower, who exposed a yield burning scandal in the 1990s, whereby financial firms made illegal profits from the structuring of U.S. government investment portfolios associated with municipal bonds.

== Early life and education ==
Lissack was born in 1958 in the United Statest and received his BA in American Civilization and Political Economy in 1979 from Williams College, and his MPPM in Business from Yale University in 1981. Later in his career in 2000 Lissack received a doctor of business administration degree from Henley Management College in the United Kingdom.

After his graduation from Yale, Lissack started at Smith Barney, where he became managing director and served in this position until 1995. From 1999 - 2017 he was the director of the Institute for the Study of Coherence and Emergence. From 1999 to 2004, Lissack also served as the editor-in-chief of Emergence: A Journal of Complexity Issues in Organizations and Management now known as E:CO.

Lissack was a candidate for county commissioner in Collier County, Florida, in 2002 and in 2006. He briefly taught business and public policy at the Central European University. Lissack was the president of the American Society for Cybernetics from 2015 to 2020.

== Career and controversies ==
=== Praise for Lissack ===
In 1999 Worth Magazine described Lissack as one of "Wall Street's 25 smartest players" and as one of the 100 Americans who have most influenced "how we think about money" in 2001.

=== Yield burning scandal ===
In 1994, Lissack exposed a major yield burning scandal on Wall Street. The issue was eventually settled by a number of firms for over $200 million, to which Lissack was entitled to at least 15% per federal whistleblower laws. Lissack used some of these funds for charitable purposes including endowing a professorship in social responsibility and personal ethics at his alma mater, Williams College.

In February 1998, Lissack entered into a voluntary agreement with the U.S. Securities and Exchange Commission whereby he was banned from the securities industry for five years and paid a $30,000 fine, as part of an arrangement by Lissack's legal team for Lissack to be on record as taking some responsibility for the scandal.

In 1998 Lissack was charged by the Manhattan District Attorney's office with making online solicitations for people to harass executives of his former employer, Salomon Smith Barney, by calling them at company headquarters and in some instances their homes. He pleaded guilty to second-degree harassment (a violation and lesser offense than the misdemeanor harassment charge with which he was originally charged), admitting he sent phony e-mails to Salomon Smith Barney employees. The guilty plea was the result of "a prolonged feud between Smith Barney and Lissack over his whistle-blowing allegations of abuses by the firm and other participants in the $1.3 trillion municipal bond business". As part of the plea, Lissack was not sentenced to jail and paid no fine.

=== Alleged harassment of Timnit Gebru ===
In February 2021 it was reported that Lissack engaged in a campaign against Timnit Gebru following her departure from Google including an extensive twitter campaign and emails to her and her supporters. Gebru was a co-author of a paper On the Dangers of Stochastic Parrots: Can Language Models Be Too Big? the publication of which resulted in her departure from Google. Gebru stated that Lissack was stalking her and colleagues. In consequence he was blocked for a period from Twitter for harassment. Lissack's response stated that his goal had been to ensure downloads of this critique of Gebru's co-authored paper which had resulted in her exit from Google. Jeff Dean, lead of Google's AI division, denied any connection with Lissack and asked him to cease making unsolicited contact with people on the subject, stating that "This kind of behavior has no place in scientific discourse".

=== Visa controversy ===
In April 2025, Michael Lissack became involved in a dispute regarding the Hawaii International Conference on System Sciences (HICSS). Professor Israr Qureshi of the Australian National University had proposed a panel entitled From Digital Divide to Digital Literacy, Equity and Inclusion, addressing how artificial intelligence, intersectionality and digital policy affect access to technology among marginalised communities. Following recent U.S. government guidance discouraging the use of terms such as “diversity, equity and inclusion” (DEI) in federally funded events, Qureshi was asked to reword the session title. In response, he publicly criticised the request on LinkedIn. Lissack, a former president of the American Society for Cybernetics, challenged Qureshi’s position online, accusing him of showing “a lack of respect for the US”, and reported him to the Department of Government Efficiency (DOGE).

Lissack told Qureshi that “visiting the US is a privilege, perhaps one that some of you should no longer enjoy.” In a separate message to Byline Times, he asserted that “foreigners who want to come to the US to promote DEI should be denied admission, as their intention is to spread what many of us regard as hate”. Qureshi subsequently withdrew from the conference in protest, stating: “I have respectfully withdrawn my name from the mini-track in protest, and will no longer be involved in it moving forward”.

Byline Times reported the incident as indicative of a broader erosion of academic freedom, observing that although Lissack claimed the incident concerned legal compliance, the conference itself was funded through participant fees rather than federal grants. Lissack dismissed the publication’s coverage as “political activism, not journalism”.

== Selected publications ==
=== Articles ===
- Lissack, Michael R. "Complexity: the science, its vocabulary, and its relation to organizations", Emergence 1.1 (1999): 110–126.
- Richardson, Kurt A., Paul Cilliers, and Michael Lissack. "Complexity Science: A "Gray" Science for the "Stuff in Between"", Emergence 3.2 (2001): 6–18.
- Lissack, Michael, and Johan Roos. "Be coherent, not visionary", Long Range Planning 34.1 (2001): 53–70.

=== Books ===
- Lissack, Michael, and Johan Roos. The next common sense; Mastering corporate complexity through (2000).
- Lissack, Michael R. Managing complexity in organizations: A view in many directions. IAP, 2005.

In 1999 Lissack published The Next Common Sense (1999) This work, co-authored with Johan Roos, presented the concepts of identity, landscape and simple guiding principles. These principles were used to develop the real-time strategy used in the first Lego Serious Play application.

In 2011 Lissack also co-authored the book Coherence in the Midst of Complexity.
