= Emotional competence =

Psychological skill

Emotional competence and emotional capital refer to the essential set of personal and social skills to recognize, interpret, and respond constructively to emotions in oneself and others. The term implies an ease around others and determines one's ability to effectively and successfully lead and express.

== Definition ==
Emotional competence refers to an important set of personal and social skills for identifying, interpreting, and constructively responding to emotions in oneself and others. The term implies ease in getting along with others and determines one's ability to lead and express effectively and successfully. Psychologists define emotional competence as the ability to monitor one's own and others' feelings and emotions and to use this information to guide one's thinking and actions.

== Description ==
Emotional competence is another term for emotional intelligence. It describes a person's ability to express their emotions completely freely, and it comes from emotional intelligence, the ability to recognize emotions. Individual's emotional competence is considered to be an important predictor of their ability to adapt to their environment, and it refers primarily to their ability to identification, understanding, expression, regulation, and use their own and other's emotions. Emotional competence is often referred to in social contexts, and is considered a capability of recognizing their own emotions, as well as those of others and expressing them in socially acceptable ways. Competence is the level of skill at which a person interacts constructively with others. This personal emotional capacity is based on a person's perception of their emotions and how they affect others, as well as the ability to maintain control and adaptation of emotions.

== History ==
In 1999, Carolyn Saarni wrote a book named The Development of Emotional Competence. Saarni believed that emotional abilities are not innate, but are cultivated and developed through children's interactions with others, especially family members and peers. Saarni defined emotional capacity as the functional ability of humans to achieve goals after experiencing an emotion-eliciting encounter. She defined emotion as a component of self-efficacy, and she described the use of emotions as a set of skills that lead to the development of emotional capacity.

== Examples ==
Understand others	to be aware of other people's feelings and perspectives
Develop others	be aware of the development needs of others and enhance their capabilities
Service orientation	anticipate, recognize and meet customer needs
Leverage diversity	nurture opportunities through different types of people

== Intelligence Quotient and Emotional Quotient ==
- Intelligence quotient (IQ) is a measure of person's reasoning ability, introduced by the German psychologist Louis William Stern as a qualitative method of assessing individual differences.
- Emotional quotient (EQ) is a measure of self-emotional control ability, introduced in American psychologist Peter Salovey in 1991. The emotional quotient is commonly referred to in the field of psychology as emotional intelligence(also known as emotional competence or emotional skills). IQ reflects a person's cognitive and observational abilities and how quickly they can use reasoning to solve problems. EQ, on the other hand, is an index of a person's ability to manage their own emotions and to manage the emotions of others.

== Daniel Goleman's model ==
In Daniel Goleman's Emotional Intelligence, he introduced five components of EQ:

- Self-awareness: precise awareness of self emotions
- Self-regulation: controlled emotional expression
- Motivation: emotional self-motivation
- Empathy: adept at modulating the emotional responses of others and helping them to express their emotions
- Social skills: excellent communication skills
- Personal Competence

Self-Awareness – Know one's internal states, preferences, resources and intuitions. The competencies in this category include:

1. Emotional Awareness – Recognize one's emotions and their effects
2. Accurate Self-Assessment – Know one's strengths and limits
3. Self-Confidence – A strong sense of one's self-worth and abilities
4. Self-Regulation – Manage one's internal states, impulses and resources.
- Social competence
1. Empathy – Awareness of others' feelings, needs and concerns. The competencies in this category include:
1. Understand Others – Sense others' feelings and perspectives
2. Develop Others – Sense others' development needs and bolstering their abilities
3. Service Orientation – Anticipate, recognize and meet customers' needs
4. Leverage Diversity – Cultivate opportunities through different kinds of people
5. Political Awareness – Read a group's emotional currents and power relationships
- Emotional intelligence

== Emotional intelligence and the Four-Branch Model ==
Psychologists see emotional competence as a continuum, ranging from lower levels of emotional competence to perform mental functions to complex emotional competence for personal self-control and management. The higher levels of emotional competence, on the other hand, comprise four branches:

- Perceive emotions in oneself and others accurately
- Use emotions to facilitate thinking
- Understand emotions, emotional language, and the signals conveyed by emotions
- Manage emotions so as to attain specific goals

Each branch describes a set of skills that make up overall emotional intelligence, ranging from low to high complexity. For example, perceiving emotions usually begins with the ability to perceive basic emotions from faces and vocal tones, and may progress to the accurate perception of emotional blends and the capture and understanding of facial micro-expressions.

== Assertiveness ==
Building up emotional competence is one way of learning to handle manipulative or passive-aggressive behavior in which the manipulator exploits the feelings of another to try to get what they want.

== See also ==
- Intercultural competence
