= Leif Edvinsson =

Business sociologist

Leif Edvinsson (born 1946) is a Swedish organizational theorist, Professor at the University of Lund in Sweden and consultant, known for his work on intellectual capital. and knowledge management.

== Life and work ==
Born in Uppsala, Edvinsson made a career at the Swedish insurance company Skandia. In the 1990s there he developed his theories about the hidden value of intellectual capital of Skandia and developed a management model for this value. In 1997 he published the book Intellectual Capital: Realizing Your Company's True Value by Finding Its Hidden Brainpower, with Michael Malone.

In 2001, he was appointed a professor at the University of Lund in Sweden. He also works as consultant for the Swedish government on knowledge and innovation.

In 1998, Edvinsson was the recipient of the prestigious Brain of the Year award. Bill Gates and Paul McCartney were also nominated that year.

== Selected publications ==
- Edvinsson, Leif, and Michael S. Malone. Intellectual Capital: Realizing Your Company\'s True Value by Finding Its Hidden Brainpower. (1997).
- Roos, Johan, Leif Edvinsson, and Goran Roos. Intellectual capital: navigating in the new business landscape. New York University Press, 1998.
