= Individual capital =

Economic view of personal talent

Individual capital, the economic view of talent, comprises inalienable or personal traits of persons, tied to their bodies and available only through their own free will, such as skill, creativity, enterprise, courage, capacity for moral example, non-communicable wisdom, invention or empathy, non-transferable personal trust and leadership.

== As recognized in theories of economics ==
Individual talent and initiative were recognized as an intangible quality of persons in economics back to at least Adam Smith. He distinguished it (as "enterprise") from labour which can be coerced and is usually seen as strictly imitative (learned or transmitted, via such means as apprenticeship).

Marxist economics refers instead to "an individual's social capital—individuals are sources neither of creativity and innovation, nor management skill. A problem with that analysis is that it simply cannot explain the substitution problem and lack of demand that occurs when, for instance, an understudy takes on a leading role, or a second author takes over writing a popular book series. At the very least there must be some conditional, if not firm-specific then "class specific", special ability to command premiums for outstanding personal performance.

Neoclassical economics by contrast refers to "the individual in whom the human capital is ... embedded", which implies a strong association of the individual with the instructional capital they learn from, with little or no social capital influence. This is orthogonal to the Marxist view, but not necessarily opposed.

Human development theory reflects both distinctions: it sees labour as the yield of individual capital in the same way that neoclassical macro-economics sees financial capital as the yield of the looser idea of human capital. But the rest problem and social welfare function selection, as well as the subjective factors in behavioral finance, has led to a closer analysis of factors of production. In effect, the financial architecture is no longer trusted as an arbiter of the value of life as it was in neoclassical economics. Money is not seen as values-neutral, but as embodying a set of larger social choices about money supply rules, made by measuring well-being of whole populations.

== Versus "human", "firm-specific", "individual social" ==
While conflated in many analyses with human capital, the latter term includes social capital (human relationships) and instructional capital (abstract texts and training materials and so on) that are not tied to any one person, do not die with them or leave employment with them, and therefore cannot be equated with talent alone. In intangibles measurement, value creation and value reporting metrics require all assets with such different characteristics to be categorized as different capital assets, so the more exact reference to the individual person is preferred.

Fusions of terminology are common. Sociological analysts refer to "individual-level elements of social capital" or "an individual's social capital" or just "individual social capital" while economic analysts often use the phrase firm-specific human capital. In either case the clearly includes individual capital but also some "activity-", "community-" or "firm-specific" social capital (community trust) and instructional capital (shareable knowledge or skills). This is easy to measure: its yield is your salary in your current job.

To the degree this is consistent if you take other work nearby, this opens the questions of what is not "firm-specific" and whether a nation is just a bigger "firm": Some analyses see political capital, or just "influence" or "trust of professionals" as a full style of capital of its own. Some ethicists, most clearly Jane Jacobs, see this as simple corruption. Nonetheless, corruption clearly has a cash value, involves some creativity to arrange, and is a decision factor. It is a skill like any other.

== Versus "intellectual capital" ==
Perhaps because of this, not all theorists recognize individual capital as being as essential as labour, or distinct from social or political influence, or from instructional capacity. These theorists often refer to "intellectual capital", which more properly describes a debate or locus of complexity that arises when individuals take key instructional roles. Some refer to celebrity as another fusion, when individuals take key social roles.

However, a great many celebrities are clearly not "intellectual" achievers nor notable for any cognitive or analytic powers, e.g. Kim Kardashian, professional sports figures or other athletes. While they may through sheer exposure become involved in causes or controversies (as Paris Hilton did in the US presidential election, 2008) it's clearly not correct to label all individually unique talent or economic value as being an "intellectual" asset.

This failure to distinguish individual's objectively observed economic value (the power to promote or publicize products, draw attention to causes, etc.) from the "intellectual" powers is probably an elitist bias. Clearly, there are some individuals, including non-humans such as a racehorse, which have economic value unique to their individual body and being that cannot be captured or defined as an "intellectual" asset nor as a set of "social" relationships (because horses do not socialize in the sense humans do). Where slavery exists or has existed, there is clearly a value put on living bodies separate from their instructional or social selves.

Thus for analyzing historical or criminal economic activities, or even professional sports, the instructional capital vs. individual capital vs. social capital distinction is essential.
