= Organizational capital =

Organizational capital is the value to an enterprise which is derived from organization philosophy and systems which leverage the organization's capability in delivering goods or services.

== Overview ==
Organizational capital is one of the three components of structural capital, itself a component of intellectual capital. But, as with other intangible assets, there is no consensus definition of what this organizational capital is, how to measure it, or how to best quantify its contribution to output (either current or future).

Organizational capital was first defined by Prescott and Visscher (1980) to be the accumulation and use of private information to enhance production efficiency within a firm. This capital can be a significant source of firm value.

Organizational capital can be formally modeled as a cluster of complementary practices and the existence of these complementarities in organizations can be empirically tested. Brynjolfsson, Lorin Hitt and Shinkyu Yang measured organizational capital in a sample of several hundred large American firms over 11 years and found that it was correlated with information technology (IT) investments and that the combination of IT and organizational capital was disproportionately productive. This suggests a degree of complementary between IT and certain organizational investments such as structural decentralization. As a result, measured productivity may at first fall (as costly, but unmeasured organizational capital is created) and then rise (as the benefits of the organizational capital are harvested), creating a productivity J-curve.

The elements that constitute the organizational capital or capital of the firm, namely its culture, structure, organizational learning, can be a source of competitive advantage. Leif Edvinsson, former head of Intellectual Capital at Skandia, was among the first to recognize that intangible assets, including organizational capital, were not represented in traditional accounting systems.

Research regarding organizational capital suggests that there are implications for mergers and acquisitions. Carlin, et al. conclude that the most efficient mergers are between large firms with substantial organization capital and smaller firms with little organization capital. They conclude that firms with richer "languages" retain more employees and are therefore more likely to promote senior managers from within, exhibit greater variability in the compensation levels of their managers and that compensation rises more quickly over time in firms with richer languages.(For proxies of "language" they used density of social networks and the quality of relationships within those networks.) Organizational capital can be decomposed into three firm specific capitals; (i)Managerial capital which denotes managerial skills that mix all internal capabilities in an intelligible way through absorption and application of new ideas that promote growth and value of the firm (ii)Process capital which include production decisions on quality management, employee programs, efficiency in operations and organizational flexibility (iii) Innovation capital that measures the ability of a firm in creating and nurturing new products and services for competitive advantage
