= Intellectual capital =

Term used in economics

Intellectual capital is the result of mental processes that form a set of intangible objects that can be used in economic activity and bring income to its owner (organization), covering the competencies of its people (human capital), the value relating to its relationships (relational capital), and everything that is left when the employees go home (structural capital), of which intellectual property (IP) is but one component. It is the sum of everything everybody in a company knows that gives it a competitive edge. The term is used in academia in an attempt to account for the value of intangible assets not listed explicitly on a company's balance sheets. On a national level, intellectual capital refers to national intangible capital (NIC).

A second meaning that is used in academia and was adopted in large corporations is focused on the recycling of knowledge via knowledge management and intellectual capital management (ICM). Creating, shaping and updating the stock of intellectual capital requires the formulation of a strategic vision, which blends together all three dimensions of intellectual capital within the organisational context through exploration, exploitation, measurement, and disclosure. Intellectual capital is used in assessing the wealth of organizations. A metric for the value of intellectual capital is the amount by which the enterprise value of a firm exceeds the value of its tangible (physical and financial) assets. Directly visible on corporate books is capital embodied in its physical assets and financial capital; however all three make up the value of an enterprise. Measuring the real value and the total performance of intellectual capital's components is a critical part of running a company in the knowledge economy and Information Age. Understanding the intellectual capital in an enterprise allows leveraging of its intellectual assets. For a corporation, the result will optimize its stock price.

The IFRS (International Financial Reporting Standards) committee developed the International Accounting System 38 with the purpose of prescribing the accounting treatment for intangible assets. IAS 38.8 defines an intangible asset as an identifiable non-monetary asset without physical substance. An asset is a resource that is controlled by the entity as the result of past events (for example purchase or self-creation) and from which future economic benefits (inflows of cash or other benefits) are expected.

== Classification ==
Intellectual capital is normally classified as follows:

- Human capital, the value that the employees of a business provide through the application of skills, know-how and expertise – Human capital is an organization's combined human capability for solving business problems and exploiting its intellectual property. Human capital is inherent in people and cannot be owned by an organization. Therefore, human capital can leave an organization when people leave, and if the management has failed to provide a setting where others can pick up their know-how. Human capital also encompasses how effectively an organization uses its people resources as measured by creativity and Innovation.
- Structural capital, the supportive non-physical infrastructure, processes and databases of the organisation that enable human capital to function – Structural capital includes processes, patents, and trademarks, as well as the organization's image, organization, information system, and proprietary software and databases. Because of its diverse components, structural capital can be classified further into organization, process and innovation capital. Organizational capital includes the organization philosophy and systems for leveraging the organization's capability. Process capital includes the techniques, procedures, and programs that implement and enhance the delivery of goods and services. Innovation capital includes intellectual property such as patents, trademarks and copyrights, and intangible assets. Intellectual properties are protected commercial rights such as patents, trade secrets, copyrights and trademarks. Intangible assets are all of the other talents and theory by which an organization is run.
- Relational capital, consisting of such elements as customer relationships, supplier relationships, trademarks and trade names (which have value only by virtue of customer relationships), licences, and franchises – The notion that customer capital is separate from human and structural capital indicates its central importance to an organization's worth. The value of the relationships a business maintains with its customers and suppliers is also referred as goodwill, but often poorly booked in corporate accounts, because of accounting rules.

== Management ==
The intangible nature of many knowledge products and processes, in combination with the increasing importance of their value in corporate balance sheets leads to a growing interest in management of intellectual capital. Creating, shaping and updating the stock of intellectual capital requires the formulation of a strategic vision, which blends together all three dimensions of intellectual capital (human, structural and relational capital) within the organisational context through exploration and exploitation, measurement and disclosure. Therefore, the organisational value of intellectual capital is developed via an ongoing and emergent process focused on the capability to leverage, develop and change the dimensions. The management of intellectual capital is conceptualised as occurring via a multiple stage process, governed by an evolutionary logic. Intellectual capital management is defined as a cycle of four inter-related sets of practices: strategic alignment, exploration and exploitation, measurement, and reporting of intellectual capital.

The recognizing and managing of intellectual capital within organizations is not always evident and straightforward; for example, what IC means differ from organization to organization; thus requiring a contextual understanding.

== Exploitation ==
The management of intellectual capital is conceptualised as occurring via a multiple stage process, governed by an evolutionary logic. For a business, translating the potential of its intellectual capital is crucial. Works that focus on the subset, namely the patents, copyrights, and trade secrets, ignore the benefits of their use with the business. Other terms include "intangible assets". While corporate reports often stress the value and the know-how of its staff, this crucial asset cannot be considered property. The term "workforce-in-place" can be used as a category when companies with their staff are purchased. Without that category, most of the excess purchase price over the tangible book value would just appear as goodwill. In order to profit from intellectual capital, knowledge management has become a task for management. Often, intellectual capital, or at least rights to it, are moved off-shore for exploitation, which entails risks that are hard to value. The transfer of rights to intellectual capital to offshore subsidiaries is a major enabler of corporate tax avoidance.

== Measurement ==
An intellectual capital audit is an audit of a company's intellectual capital to monitor and oversee the intellectual capital of a firm in order to capitalize on intellectual capital already within the company, and to identify opportunities to increase the intellectual capital of the company.

Early methods of intellectual capital measurement include the balanced scorecard (BSC) framework, the Skandia Navigator, and the Intangible Asset Monitor. Additionally, the Value-Added Intellectual Coefficient method (VAIC) was introduced in 1993 to measure the value created by intellectual capital.

== Intellectual capital and stock returns growth ==
Changes in stock returns are primarily determined by external factors such as inflation, exchange rates, and socioeconomic conditions. Intellectual capital does not affect a company stock's current earnings. Intellectual capital contributes to a stock's return growth.
