= Body neutrality =

Movement advocating the mental quality that seeks to accept oneself and one's body

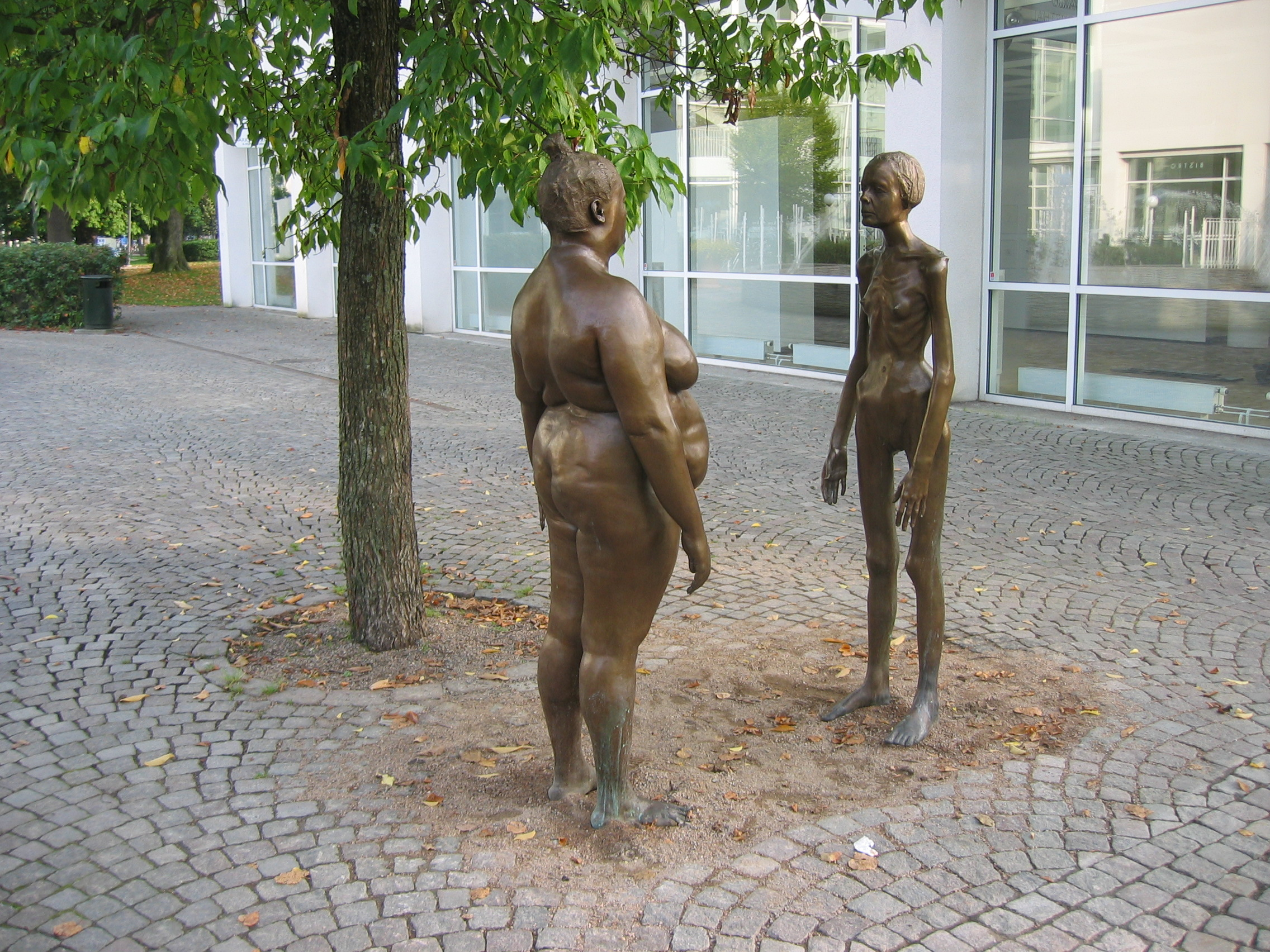
The sculpture of two women in bronze, Jag tänker på mig själv – Växjö ( 'I am thinking of myself – Växjö') by Marianne Lindberg De Geer, 2005, outside the art museum of Växjö, Sweden. (Note: De Geer's sculpture depicts one thin woman and one fat woman and demonstrates society's infatuation with outward appearances. The sculpture has been a source of controversy in the town, with both statues being vandalized and repaired during 2006.)

The concept of body neutrality encourages the mindset that a person's bodily appearance, and attitudes towards it, should have the least possible effect on their experience of life. Its proponents assert that people should neither be celebrated for their conformance with an ideal of bodily beauty nor criticized for departure from such a condition. It may be contrasted with body positivity, the fat acceptance movement, lookism, and body shaming. Some explanations of the body neutrality concept emphasize a body's functionality over its aesthetics.

== Description ==
As the term suggests, 'body neutrality' offers a middle way between the attitudes of body negativity present in lookism and body shaming, and the all-accepting approach found in body positivity and the fat acceptance movement.

=== Avoiding "toxic body positivity" ===
The psychologist Susan Albers explains that the affirmations required in adopting body positivity may feel inauthentic; with body neutrality, "Your value is not tied to your body nor does your happiness depend on what you look like. A body-positive approach says you are beautiful no matter what. Period". With regard to body positivity, researchers Lisa Legault and Anise Sago argue that an undue emphasis on body positivity can "stifle and diminish important negative feelings". They explain that negative feelings are a natural part of the human experience and that such feelings can be important and informational. They write that "ignoring negative feelings and experiences exerts a cost to authenticity and self-integration". The body positivity movement, they argue, can make it seem like a person should only feel positive emotions. This expectation to have only positive feelings is sometimes called "toxic body positivity".

== Development of body neutrality ==
Body image is a person's perception of their physical self and their thoughts and feelings, positive and negative, as a result of that perception. With societal pressures, especially pressures linked to social media, impacting people's mental health due to body insecurity, body positivity might be challenging. Body neutrality seeks to lessen the relationship between a person's health and well-being to their physical appearance.

Since its emergence around 2015, body neutrality has offered some hope even for those who struggle to find any positive attitudes towards their physical self. Experimental studies indicate that even brief exposure to body neutrality content on social media can have beneficial psychological effects, improving body satisfaction and overall mood.

== Body neutrality in online communities and social media ==
=== Overview ===
Body neutrality is a topic of online discussion. This has been accompanied by research on how body neutrality is represented in online communities and what the consequences of that exposure might be. Research includes content analysis of platform discourse, randomized exposure studies, and digital intervention evaluations.

=== Body neutrality talk on TikTok ===
Studies have examined the portrayal of body neutrality on social media platforms like TikTok. An analysis of 178 TikTok videos using the hashtag #bodyneutrality revealed three main themes: the normalization of diverse bodies, the rejection and dismissal of appearance being the most important and fundamental thing, and positioning body neutrality in contrast to body positivity. Their research showed that body neutrality content often presents the body as normal and as something that is useful rather than just positioning it as an aesthetic object to be judged.

Similarly, a content analysis was performed on 394 TikTok videos tagged with body-positive and body-neutral hashtags. The authors identify recurring themes in body neutral-content such as size, inclusivity, adaptive self investment, body appreciation, and no judgment messaging that all describe and emphasize how a person's worth should not be dependent on how they look.

=== Effects of exposure to body neutral content ===
Researchers have not only described online discourse but also have undertaken experimental studies and research to assess the psychological impacts of exposure to body neutrality content. Seekis and Lawrence (2023) conducted a randomized controlled experiment with 189 undergraduate women. Subjects viewed TikTok videos that included either: body neutrality content, thin ideal content, or an art based control video. After controlling pre-test measures, the researchers found that women in the body neutral condition reported more satisfaction with their body and a higher appreciation for functionality compared to those in the thin ideal and control groups. Moreover, participants who viewed body neutral content also reported they felt better and didn't compare themselves to skinny people as frequently. These findings support a short term relationship between exposure to body neutrality content on TikTok and improvements in body image related characteristics in a young adult population.

Similar patterns have been observed on Instagram, including a randomized study of how people felt about their bodies after seeing fit-inspiration, body-positive, and text-based body-neutrality posts. People were more dissatisfied with their bodies after seeing 'fitspiration' posts and less dissatisfied after seeing body-positive and body-neutral posts. However, there were caveats about the emotional effects of exposure depending on the type of material and the measurements being used. These findings suggest that body neutrality messaging functions in distinct ways to thin ideal content for immediate body image effects.

=== Micro-interventions on social media ===
Researchers have examined whether engaging with body-positive or appearance-neutral content over time can work as a micro intervention. An evaluation of body-positive and appearance-neutral Facebook groups found that participants in both groups reported reduced body dissatisfaction from pre test (T1) to post test (T2) following the 14 day intervention period. However, the authors noted that there wasn't much evidence and the topic is in need of further research to understand changes happening during further follow-up assessments. The study said that exposure to this kind of content could be a low cost micro-intervention and also the effects were different across outcome measures.

=== Adolescence and the growth of digital intervention ===
Body neutrality has also been a topic of digital mental health programs for youth. In one pilot evaluation, researchers reported that the intervention was acceptable to participants and showed initial success among adolescents who were concerned about body image and mood.

=== Framing by the public and media ===
Credible media sources and peer reviewed research have described body neutrality as an alternative to body positivity for individuals who find it hard to maintain and keep close to their heart messages of self love. With research it has been evident that body neutrality shifts focus away from appearance towards what the body can do and how it functions and everyday experiences. Reporting in The Guardian noted that some advocates perceived body neutrality as a way of diminishing the importance of looks and physical appearance in daily life.

== Adopters of body neutrality ==
Amongst body neutrality's better-known adherents is Erynn Chambers, a TikTok creator who has practiced body neutrality for multiple years. She states, "I don't want to hate my body, but I don't feel like a goddess either" -instead, she suggests that people should appreciate what their bodies can do rather than the way they look. Bethany C. Meyers, another content creator who identifies as queer, has "dedicated their life to exploring themselves and what it means to love themselves and others". They created the project 'be.come' to encourage confidence without intimidation, through their own transparency.

Other body neutral creators include Gabi Gregg and Stephanie Yeboah.

== Bibliography ==
- Wolf, Naomi (1990). The Beauty Myth. Chatto & Windus. ISBN 978-0-385-42397-7.
- Rees, Anuschka (2019). Beyond Beautiful: A Practical Guide to Being Happy, Confident, and You in a Looks-Obsessed World. Potter/Ten Speed/Harmony/Rodale. ISBN 9780399582097.
- Kneeland, Jessi (2023). Body Neutral: A Revolutionary Guide to Overcoming Body Image Issues. Penguin. ISBN 978-0593491768.

== See also ==
- Ableism
- Attributional ambiguity
- Body dysmorphic disorder
- Egalitarianism
- Human physical appearance
- Insecurity (emotion)
- Physical attractiveness stereotype
- Social stigma
- Stigma (sociological theory)
- Thinspiration
- Ugliness
- Unattractiveness
