= Dr Fox =

Dr Fox may refer to:

- Neil Fox (broadcaster) (born 1961), British radio and television presenter
- Liam Fox (born 1961), British Conservative Member of Parliament
- Dr. Fox effect, in educational psychology, named after the identity Dr. Myron L. Fox
- Dr. Fox, a character from Unikitty!
