= TITP =

TITP may refer to:

- T in the Park, a music festival in Scotland
- TITP, a stock symbol used for the Greek company Titan Cement
- This is Thin Privilege, a popular body privilege Tumblr blog.
