= Lookism (manhwa) =

South Korean webtoon by Taejun Pak

- Lookism volume 1 cover

외모지상주의 RR: Oemo jisangjuui MR: Oemo chisangjuŭi
- Genre: Comedy; Crime drama Supernatural; Action
- Author: Taejun Pak
- Publisher: Daewon and Book
- Webtoon service: Naver Webtoon (Korean); Line Webtoon (English)
- Original run: November 20, 2014 – present
- Volumes: 20

Lookism
- Written by: Isao Murayama
- Directed by: Kwang Il Han
- Music by: Kyung-Hoon Han
- Country of origin: South Korea
- Original language: Korean
- No. of episodes: 8

Production
- Production company: Studio Mir

Original release
- Network: Netflix
- Release: December 8, 2022

Lookism (Korean: 외모지상주의) is a South Korean webtoon written and illustrated by Taejun Pak. The webtoon was first published weekly on Naver Webtoon in November 2014. Its story revolves around a high-school student who can switch between two bodies: one fat and ugly, and the other fit and handsome.

An aeni series adaptation by Studio Mir was released globally in December 2022 on Netflix.

== Plot ==
Park Hyung Seok (Daniel Park in English translations) is an unpopular highschool student who was bullied by his fellow students for his obesity. Bullied and harassed every day by delinquent Logan Lee, Hyung Seok takes out his anger verbally on his mother and asks for a school transfer. Resolving to run away from his problems and start anew, he moves to Seoul and plans to attend a new high school. A few nights before he begins school, however, he receives a new body that is tall, muscular, and handsome. When one body is in use, the other falls asleep; he can switch bodies by waking up the sleeping one.

His days are split between the two bodies: the handsome one for the daytime, and the original for the night. As Hyung Seok lives with two bodies, he begins to see how much the world discriminates against ugly people. He experiences discrimination and hate for his original body while receiving kindness and special treatment in his new body. He soon becomes a social media influencer, a trainee for an entertainment company, and a fashion model. At night, however, Hyung Seok's dream life becomes a harsh reality when he returns to his original body.

The story later changes from problems of being ugly to showing the dark side of Korean society and then slowly to Hyung Seok fighting crime.

== Characters ==
=== Main ===
Park Hyung Suk/Park Daniel/Keisuke Hasegawa
Voiced by: Shim Kyu-hyuk (Korean); Yoshitsugu Matsuoka (Japanese); Nicky Endres (small), Garrett Galego (big) (English)
Park Hyung Seok is a naive, short, obese and unattractive high-school student who was bullied relentessly by Lee Tae Sung every single day. Before transferring to Jae Won High School to escape the bullying, he awakens one day with a tall, athletic and extremely attractive body next to his obese one. Realizing that he can switch bodies after one is sleeping, with his new body, he starts a new life. During the day he goes to school and makes friends and rivals, thanks to the attractiveness and surprising strength of the second body and in the night he works at his local Mart seeing how the world treats people differently due to looks, with the 1st body. After an incident due to Jiho he goes into a coma and finds out his real name, or specifically the second body's real name, is Lee Jihoon (Lee James) a former prodigy both academically and physically who mysteriously disappeared. He is threatened by Choi Dong Soo (Choi Charles) to stop searching for him. However, Hyung Seok arrives at the conclusion that he and, consequentially, DG know about his body but to reveal it he will face the 4 major crew.

Lee Eun Tae/Vasco/Basco
Voiced by: Jeong Jae Heon (Korean), Shunsuke Takeuchi (Japanese); Kaiji Tang (English)
Lee Eun Tae has a reputation of being a Robin Hood-like figure, defending the weak and bullied. A childhood friend of Park Bum Jae, he leads Burn Knuckles – a gang which punishes bullies and other wrongdoers. Despite his tough exterior, he is sweet and seeks the friendship of those he considers good.

Hong Jae Yeol/Hong Jay
A quiet, wealthy, and mysterious character who uses the systema and kali martial arts.

Lee Jin Sung/Lee Zach/Ryūsei Kitahara
Voiced by: Wataru Urata (Japanese); Jason Jin (English)
Lee Jin Sung is a boxer who was aggressive towards everyone except his childhood friend, Kim Mi Jin, whom he loves. Mi Jin dislikes violence, so Jin Sung stops bullying and becomes more patient.

Kim Mi Jin/Kim Mira/Mizuki Sakane
Voiced by: Natsu Yorita (Japanese); Nikki SooHoo (English)
Kim Mi Jin is compassionate, patient, and observant, and sees the good in everyone. Seong Yo Han and Lee Jin Sung were in love with her.

DG/Diego Kang/James Lee
Famous K-pop star who has some hidden past identity, the original James Lee. One of Charles Choi's associates, who seems to know about Daniel's ability and is modeled on G-Dragon. He is most probably the strongest character in the First Generation.

Kitae Kim
Introduced as the illegitimate child of powerful gangster of Korea(Gapryong Kim) and also half brother to Jake Kim. He lived in Mexico for some years and became a cartel leader. and now is the villain in the story alongside James Lee

Johan Seong
Zack and Mira's childhood friend. Bullied because he was poor and his mother was going blind, he had a crush on Mira. His mother's mental state deteriorates and a local religious figure persuades her to join the God Dog cult. Johan takes over the cult, taking its mascot as his own. He aids Jace in Cheonliang and fights with Jin before joining the White Tiger Job Center under Tom Lee. Left the group and becomes allied with Charles Choi, but his sight was still worsening. He picked up other martial arts as his arsenal.

Eli Jang/Jang Hyun
The single father of a baby girl named Yenna, the daughter of his teenage sweetheart Heather. Jong Gun had his eyes on him for his fighting prowess but also because Eli created the original Hostel. Currently under Eugene's control.

Samuel Seo
An executive, working for the workers. Previously from Big Deal and was known as Big Deal No.3. He was initially on Alexander's side, then takes over the affiliates that has fallen. Initially allied with Eugene, but turned after a deal with Johan. His goal is to become "King" and will do whatever it takes to do so.

Park Ha Neul/Park Zoey/Kagawa Mirei
Voiced by: Sa Moon Young (Korean), Saori Hayami (Japanese); Courtney Lin (English)
Park Ha Neul is a beautiful girl who tried to use charm to get what she wanted. After Park Hyung Seok's original body saves her from a stalker, however, she develops romantic feelings for him.
Choi Soo Jung/CrystalChoi/Akari Nerima
Voiced by: Reina Aoyama (Japanese); Halley Kim (English)
Choi Soo Jung is daughter of the HNH company chairman, also has two bodies. First, an overweight student who transfers to the fashion department of Hyung Seok's school, she lives in her original body during the day. Her different treatment leads her to believe that the world judges those with a different appearance unkindly. Soo Jung sees the handsome Hyung Seok as an egotistical bully (based on his looks) and prefers the original Hyung Seok.

=== Supporting ===
Hyung Seok's mother/Mrs. Park Seon Hul/Mrs. Park Kim
Hyung Seok's single mother is an old, hardworking, and patient woman. After seeing Lee Tae Sung bully Hyung Seok, and her son yelling at her, she transfers him to Jae Won High School. She works twice as hard to enable Hyung Seok to attend Jae Won High, folding and selling empty boxes and working part-time waiting tables. More than anything, she wants Hyung Seok to be happy. As he matures, Hyung Seok begins to appreciate and help his mother.

Park Bum Jae/Jace Park
Park Bum Jae, the second-in-command of the Burn Knuckles, is a childhood friend of Lee Eun Tae and helped him overcome his fear of needles.

Pyeon Deok Hwa/Pyeon Duke/Hinto Kon
Voiced by: Tsuguo Mogami (Japanese); Eugene Kon (English)
A short, plump student and an aspiring rapper who was bullied by others and rejected by producers. When he meets and collaborates with Hyung Seok, he gains confidence, begins streaming on TV and becomes famous. In the middle of the webtoon, he became a famous rapper.

Park Jiho/Park Jiho
Bullied at J High until Hyung Seok takes him under his wing, he is obsessed with power and societal standards. Ji ho shows signs of an inferiority complex and goes to juvenile prison for the attempted murders of Hyung Seok Park and Gong Yeong Hun. He becomes mentally ill in prison and is influenced by Kim Gi Myeong. He commits suicide after a fight with Hyung Seok, while being haunted by his hallucinations.

Lee Tae Sung/Lee Logan
A big, strong character who bullied Hyung Seok Park in his former school; after Hyung Seok moved to Seoul, Tae Sung did too. Hyung Seok stands up to Tae Sung in his original body, and they reach an uneasy truce. Tae Sung is expelled after assaulting his advisor.

Jin Ho Bin/Bin Vin/Takahito Saitama
Voiced by: Daisuke Ono (Japanese); Nick Martineau (English)
Arrogant, he says he is better than everyone else and dislikes Hyung Seok and Duk Hea. He fears losing his sunglasses, and loses control when they are removed; this is later explained by his polycoria in one eye.

Kim Mi Roo/Kim Mary
A pretty, blonde girl who is friends with Jin Ho Bin and is known in Cheonliang (her and Ho Bin's hometown) as the Empress of Two Seconds because she defeats opponents in a fight in two seconds. She hides her past as overweight but skilled in Judo and receiving plastic surgery.

Kim Yoo-I/Kim Yui
The leading streamer on Paprika TV until Park Ha Neul joins the website. When her boyfriend learns from Lee Jin Sung that she flirted with Hyung Seok, he beats her until Jin Sung stops him. She then develops feelings for Lee Jin Sung.

Lee Hyun Do/Lee Doo
Jiho's main tormentor, he stays around Lee Jin Sung and Park Hyung Seok mostly to increase his popularity but helps them as needed. A streamer on Paprika TV, Park Tae Joon collaborates with him to taunt Shin Dae Hoon; they are caught by his gang before being bailed out by Lee Eun Tae, Lee Jin Sung, and Park Hyung Seok. He later sometimes appears as Hyung Seok destroys the Workers, once as part of Hwang Jae Won's clean-up crew, then became Hannya of Sōma Mitsuki's crew.

Park Tae Joon
An Executive Manager of PTJ Entertainment who will do almost anything for fame.
Leonn Lee
A mysterious freshman who is revealed to be a girl, her character is a tsundere.
Joy Hong/Hong Jae Hye
Jay's little sister and a model who has a crush on handsome Daniel and enrolls in J High to see him more often.
Nam Su Lee
A nerdy classmate tasked by Zack to buy shoes for him. He buys a ring and says that Daniel is poor and has no fashion sense, and Jay gives Daniel a collection of expensive clothes.
David, Dylan and Sarah Park
Daniel's cousins. Dylan wants to be a rapper, and is Duke's fan; David, a college student, is the star of the Park family, being enrolled into a prestigious university; Sarah, Dylan's sister, has a crush on handsome Daniel.
Hong Ki Tae
Jay's older brother. The polar opposite of Jay.
Alexander Hwang
Samuel's associate, who disappears.
Like What and So Funny
Runaway girls who are first forced into prostitution and then begin streaming to earn money. Currently under Sally Park's care.
Warren Chae
Speaks in broken sentences before joining Daniel in his mission. He regains his speech later on and joins Eli in his endeavors.
Sally Park
Usually seen with Warren Chae, she is an orphan who lives in an abandoned building inherited from her grandmother in the US.
Max Kang and Derek Jo
Tteokbokki sellers and club promoters. The power duo of Hostel.
Olly Wang
Heather's friend and schoolmate. Betrayed Hostel after he wasn't included, which nearly destroyed the fam. He created his own Hostel from scratch. Commits suicide after learning the source of his inability to feel pain, his guilt over Heather's tragic end.
James Gong
Jiho's psychotic, sadistic bully. Resurfaced after escaping the hospital he was, joining initially Olly's Hostel, then left with Jasmine and Olly's orphans aboard a coaster.
Jasmine Huh
Daniel's classmate, who is a pathological liar. She lives with James and the child soldiers trained by Olly trained, riding a stolen bus.
Jong Gun/Jang Dong Gun
Crystal Choi's sadomasochistic gangster bodyguard, who is an extortionist. Once a Yakuza member, he destroyed the clan after he got bored, and became Charles Choi's money collector. After Charles Choi commits suicide, Jong Gun is charged after taking the fall for his boss.
Joon Goo/Goo Kim
A fighter who frequents juvenile centers and succeeds Jong Gun in his extortion racket after Gun loses interest in it. Initially appears as a paid merc by his own cousin.
Jerry Kwon
Jake Kim's number-two, known as Jake Kim's Sword, who cares for the cat Leon. Usually gentle, except when following Jake's orders.
Jin Jang
Johan's faithless lieutenant, who begins spying on J High and plots to pit the students against each other. He later revives his K House gang from the God Dog ruins.
Kouji/Ko Woo Ji
A hacker, he dupes the illegal toto operators and hacks the security feed of the store at which Daniel works. He wants to hack onto Jay's systems.
Charles Choi/Elite
Crystal's father, an executive who worked at a convenience store until he created 4 crews with Jong Gun and other geniuses. He raised 10 geniuses (Group of 10 people who are extremely capable in their respective fields, DG and Kouji among them).
Steve Hong
Ki Tae, Joy and Jay's father, an executive who knows Charles Choi. He becomes Daniel's secret ally to take down the four gangs.
Oliver Jang/Jang Udon/Woo Dong Jang
Debuts in a new group, Inspirit. Was once in relationship with ARU, until she betrayed him. Became a perpetual trainee until Daniel and Joy joins the crew.
La Sol/Ra Sol
Another perpetual trainee alongside Oliver who becomes a trainer. ARU's friend, was reduced to her status after ARU rose above the rank.
ARU
Oliver's ex-girlfriend and a star who is caught in a casting couch situation.
Tom Lee
One of Charles Choi's 10 Geniuses and owner of a private security agency, White Tiger. Prefers fighting on boxer shorts.
Justine Peng and Chuck Kwak
Two illegal Chinese immigrants rejected by Jake Kim but later accepted by Olly Wang.
Vivi
Chinese woman who flees to Korea to escape her Chinese drug cases, the head of a powerful family who built a club and hotel to cover her drug addiction. She later returns to China with Xiaolung.
Xiaolung
Vivi's servant, who becomes a eunuch to remain close to her. He returns to Korea after taking Vivi home and joins Eugene.
Alexander Kwang
Covers up his rackets by imprisoning promising vloggers and forcing them to work for him, but is foiled by Daniel. Disappeared afterward, last seen as part of a clean-up crew.
Sofia
A muscular Russian woman, Steve Hong's bodyguard, who trains Daniel to reduce his weight.
Eugene
Head of the gang for which Samuel works, who issues deceptive invitations in Olly Wang's name. He invites the other gangs to unite against Charles Choi; Jake, Justin and Chuck accept, and Johan and Eli decline. He Apprentices Daniel, but does not trust him. He has a twin brother named Yuseong, who was the mysterious silent capped character with black VVIP badge.
Yuseong
Eugene's twin brother, a silent but emotionally unstable person.
Hudson Ahn, Jacky Lee and Channing Choi
Leaders of the Ansan Public, a group trying to establish a footing in Seoul. Join Jiho and Darius Hong to form the James Lee Crew, and return to Ansan after being beaten by Daniel, Zack and Vasco. Hudson is their leader, Jacky is the most agile, and Channing is a sadist.
Mitsuki/Neko
Leader of the 2nd affiliate and emcee of the underground death-match club, who has feelings for Sinu.
Ryūhei/Nōmen
Acquaintance of Mitsuki who wears a Nōmen mask. His name was Ryūhei.
Hyottoko and Daruma
Two masked men; Hyottoko is a sumo wrestler and discharged JSDF soldier named Kazuma Sato, and Daruma is a former Yakuza named Kenta Magami, who had grudge against Jong-gun for destroying his clan.

Lineman

He is one of the main fighters in the Big deal, under Jake kim. And he is trained by Lightning choi of Gapryong kim fist gang

Sinu Han

The first leader of Big deal. He starts Big deal to protect his street from other thugs, Which is later taken over by Jake kim

Jinyoung park / JinYeong park

He is a medical prodigy and skilled fighter, who is main member of Gapryong Kim's Fist Gang. He has an ability to copy any fighting skill he sees once. He is also the uncle of Daniel Park who inherited his copy ability.

Gapryong Kim

He was the most influential Gangster who fought against Shingen Yamazaki and his clan with his Fist Gang and saved Korea. He tried to become a congressman but died even before achieving it. He is also the father of Jake kim and Kitae Kim

== Themes ==
The webtoon's main theme is lookism: bias based on a person's physical appearance. Daniel, the main character, is an overweight, unattractive student who is bullied until his appearance changes. Other themes include gangs, extortion, bullying, animal hoarding, cults, body shaming, anti-social behaviours, stalking, body positivity, rape, and attempted murder.

== Character designs ==
Daniel's design was inspired by model Park Hyung-seok. Jay Hong's design was inspired by model Hong Jae-yeol; DG was inspired by G-Dragon; Oliver Jang's design was inspired by Jang Dongwoo, ARU by singer IU, and Jace is modeled after former 2PM leader and singer Jay Park. Vasco/Euntae Lee was inspired by a rapper whose former stage name was Vasco. The manhwa was created by Taejun Pak, also a model.

== Manhwa ==
=== Volume list ===
No.	Korean release date	Korean ISBN
1	May 17, 2017	979-1-13-342885-4
2	March 25, 2018	979-1-13-343055-0
3	April 25, 2018	979-1-13-347732-6
4	May 25, 2018	979-1-13-348045-6
5	July 10, 2018	979-1-13-348366-2
6	September 25, 2018	979-1-13-348406-5
7	October 25, 2018	979-1-13-349354-8
8	December 15, 2018	979-1-13-349915-1
9	July 20, 2019	979-1-13-620271-0
10	October 2, 2019	979-1-13-348045-6
11	December 15, 2019	979-1-13-621739-4
12	February 2, 2020	979-1-13-622100-1
13	April 15, 2020	979-1-13-622886-4
14	July 1, 2020	979-1-13-623408-7
15	November 15, 2020	979-1-13-625262-3
16	February 15, 2021	979-1-13-625923-3
17	May 5, 2021	979-1-13-627038-2
18	August 5, 2021	979-1-13-628194-4
19	January 19, 2022	979-1-13-628195-1
20	May 20, 2022	979-1-13-628196-8

== Adaptations ==
=== Chinese television series ===
Tencent produced 外貌至上主义 (Wàimào Zhìshàng Zhǔyì), a 38-episode Chinese television series based on Lookism, in 2019. The Chinese series starred Lomon, Wayne Zhang, Wang Zi Xuan and Dino Lee.

=== Korean aeni series ===
A Korean aeni series adaptation by Studio Mir titled 외모지상주의; Oemojisangjuui was announced during Netflix's "Tudum" virtual event on September 25, 2022. The series is directed by Kwang Il Han, with Dae Woo Lee doing the art direction and Kyung-Hoon Han composing the music. It was originally set to be released worldwide on Netflix on November 4, 2022, but was delayed to December 8, due to the Seoul Halloween crowd crush. Ateez performed the series' theme song "Like That" accompanying the opening credits of the show made by Andarta Pictures, a French animation studio.

==== Episodes ====
No.	English title (Korean title)	Directed by	Animation director(s)	Original release date
1	"Change"; Transliteration: "Byeonhwa" (Korean: 변화)	Kang Heechul	Sanghyeok Bang	December 8, 2022
Episode 1 of "Lookism" kicks off with a gritty and heart-wrenching glimpse into the life of Park Hyeong-seok. A target of incessant bullying, Hyeong-seok's every move is critiqued and ridiculed by his classmates, be it his weight, his financial status, or the way he simply looks. His moments of torment are punctuated with jeers of "pig" and "loser", pushing him further into a pit of despair and loneliness. A particularly brutal scene takes center stage when Tae-seong and his gang turn a game of dodgeball into a harrowing ordeal for Hyeong-seok, aiming directly for his head with every throw. The situation only grows graver when his mother intervenes, with Hyeong-seok's embarrassment culminating in a public argument that leaves onlookers whispering. Desperate for escape, Hyeong-seok pleads with his mother to change schools, hoping to find a fresh start. His wish is granted, and we watch as he navigates his new surroundings with a mix of trepidation and hope. However, just when Hyeong-seok thinks he's got a fresh start, an altercation with a student named Jin-seong sends him spiraling back into the shadows of public humiliation, with a video of the fight going viral. But the twist in the tale comes post this brutal beating. Waking up from his slumber, Hyeong-seok finds himself in a completely unfamiliar body - fit, tall, and conventionally attractive. The once-bullied teenager is now turning heads everywhere he goes. His newfound looks grant him instant popularity, as classmates gush over his appearance and even speculate about his identity.
2	"New Life"; Transliteration: "Saeloun Saenghwal" (Korean: 새로운 생활)	Park So-young	Dongju Yang; Yeonhee Lee	December 8, 2022
As the episode unfolds, we discover Hyeong-seok's unusual ability to switch bodies after he falls asleep, making him essentially live two different lives. At school, he garners attention due to his tall stature and handsome looks. This draws the attention of multiple classmates, including the flirtatious Ha-neul. However, his looks also earn him unexpected challenges and confrontations, especially with a notorious bully named Lee Jin-seong. The episode introduces the school's unique structure of various specialized classes, ranging from Fashion Design to Cosmetology. Hyeong-seok's decision to join the Fashion Design class is met with surprise and curiosity, emphasizing the school's distinctive nature. As the story progresses, we delve deeper into Hyeong-seok's struggles with juggling his dual lives. He struggles with finding a job and even gets one at a convenience store, only to have a fateful encounter with Jin-seong and his gang. The climax of the episode takes place when Jin-seong, known for his boxing prowess, confronts Hyeong-seok. An intense fight ensues. Contrary to expectations, Hyeong-seok manages to dodge Jin-seong's punches and even lands a surprising knockout punch, leaving the entire school in shock. Hyeong-seok's unexpected skills and strength become the talk of the school. By the end of the episode, Hyeong-seok's reputation at school changes dramatically. While he gains respect and admiration from some students, he also draws the attention of the school's bullies and notorious gangs, hinting at further challenges and confrontations in upcoming episodes.
3	"Friends"; Transliteration: "Chingu" (Korean: 친구)	Seungwoo Han	Sanghyeok Bang; Yongho Kim	December 8, 2022
The excitement is short-lived as the scene moves to a convenience store setting where the stark difference in how people perceive others based on their looks is made glaringly evident. Here, Park Ji-ho struggles with his two identities: one being ridiculed and the other, puzzlingly, drawing concern. After a botched theft, a series of photos potentially jeopardizing Ji-ho's reputation becomes the center of the tension. Then, an unexpected intervention occurs. A character named Basco, recognized as a strong figure in their school, steps in. Conversations reveal that Basco is also known as Lee Eun-tae, the founder of a group called Burn Knuckle. There's a mix of awe and fear around him, and he is seen to have a disdain for those who take advantage of the weak. The school setting shifts to the cafeteria, where the balance of power and alliances are displayed. Hyeong-seok, another central character, draws attention. The episode delves into the juxtaposition of his strength and vulnerability, particularly when alcohol is brought into play. A series of misunderstandings, confrontations, and eventual reconciliations lead to a new dynamic between Hyeong-seok, Basco, and Ji-ho. Amidst the chaotic interplay of friendships and rivalries, the episode ends on a mysterious note. Hyeong-seok, who earlier had been seen seamlessly switching between two identities, finds himself in a familiar setting but with a twist, emphasizing the recurring theme of dual identities. The final scene takes us back to school where Hyeong-seok's and Ji-ho's unlikely friendship blooms, leaving viewers on a cliffhanger about the unfolding relationship dynamics in Jaewon High School.
4	"Mom"; Transliteration: "Eomma" (Korean: 엄마)	Kang Heechul	Sanghyeok Bang; Yongho Kim	December 8, 2022
It starts with the revelation of Hyeong-seok's living situation. In a twist of events, we find out he's been rooming with a friend to save on rent, and unbeknownst to his mother, he's been working nights at a convenience store. This discovery catches Hyeong-seok's mom off guard as she visits, leading to an insightful chat between her and Hyeong-seok's roommate. Their conversation unveils Hyeong-seok's past, where he was bullied in his previous school, making his mother question his current state. The roommate assures her of his well-being, but as the story unfolds, the sincerity of this assurance is in question. As the narrative progresses, we witness a heated confrontation in which Hyeong-seok's roommate gets involved in a misunderstanding over money he accepted from Hyeong-seok's mom. This altercation with another student reveals a raw display of martial arts, showcasing the physical prowess of the characters involved. While Hyeong-seok's roommate is berated for taking money, the scene culminates in an unexpected victory against Basco, a formidable fighter known for his strength. This sparks a realization in the roommate of his own potential strength. Later at a convenience store, Hyeong-seok's roommate's internal conflict continues. He confronts his perceived weakness, yearning to grow stronger. An act of kindness from an unknown individual further fuels his determination, ending the episode with a light-hearted attempt at sit-ups, which humorously contrasts the intense confrontations earlier. The episode deepens the audience's understanding of Hyeong-seok's personal struggles, his relationship with his mother, and the emerging power dynamics among students, leaving us in anticipation of what comes next.
5	"Kidness"; Transliteration: "Houi" (Korean: 호의)	Park So-young	Park Hyung-geun	December 8, 2022
6	"Recommendation"; Transliteration: "Gwon-yu" (Korean: 권유)	Seungwoo Han	Yang Dong-joo; Lee Yeon-hee	December 8, 2022
7	"Special Training"; Transliteration: "Teughun" (Korean: 특훈)	Kang Heechul	Yang Dong-joo; Lee Yeon-hee	December 8, 2022
8	"Wall"; Transliteration: "Byeog" (Korean: 벽)	Park So-young	Park Hyung-geun	December 8, 2022
