= Paul Campos =

American law professor and blogger

Paul F. Campos is a law professor, author and blogger on the faculty of the University of Colorado Boulder in Boulder. Campos received his A.B. (1982) and M.A. in English (1983) from the University of Michigan and in 1989 his J.D. from the University of Michigan Law School. Campos worked at the law firm Latham & Watkins in Chicago from 1989-1990 and became an associate professor at the University of Colorado in 1990, where he teaches classes on property, punishment theory, jurisprudence and legal interpretation.

== Biography ==
=== The Obesity Myth ===
Campos authored the 2004 book The Obesity Myth (later published as The Diet Myth) which reviews medical research on the association between higher body mass and health. Campos's contentions that obesity is healthy were praised by some sociologists and critical theorists, and overwhelmingly criticized by medical, epidemiological and statistical researchers with professional training in empirical research.

Soowon Kim and Barry M. Popkin praised Campos for "bringing attention to some of the complexities in overweight/obesity and health relationships and covert financial interests involved in obesity research" but criticized him for "selective use of research", "fallacious interpretation of literature" and "misunderstanding of basic epidemiological principles" and thereby "harm[ing] the most vulnerable subgroups in the population." Neville Rigby criticized Campos's lack of relevant academic qualifications and poor grasp of scientific research, noting that: "It is unusual to find academics concerned chiefly with legal, social, political, and educational issues seeking to challenge the whole arena of the epidemiology, clinical, and public health aspects of the obesity problem. To start from scratch to deal with all their spurious statements in this response is hardly appropriate. The suggestion that there is growing ‘concern’ about the validity of the serious health issues associated with obesity is really quite bizarre, as there has been the most remarkable and growing consensus among an extensive range of governments, academics, health economists, and policy makers relating to the impact of excess weight gain." June Stevens, Jill E. McClain and Kimberly P. Truesdale countered specific claims about the state of scientific research made by Campos. Campos's obesity work was praised by sociologist Susie Orbach for discussing unhealthy body image issues related to an emphasis on extreme thinness.

Other obesity skeptics have cited Campos's work as support for their own views. For example, in his 2010 book The End of the Obesity Epidemic, Michael Gard, an Honorary Associate Professor at the School of Human Movement studies of University of Queensland, identified Campos as one of three scholars (along with University of Chicago political scientist J. Eric Oliver and Arizona State University exercise physiologist Glenn Gaesser) who have led the way in constructing a counter-narrative to the claims of those who argue higher body weight represents a major public health crisis: "Together, these [three authors] have helped popularize obesity skepticism as a legitimate intellectual position ... Most crucial of all, they have each contributed to building the case against seeing obesity per se as a disease, demonstrating that the health risks of fatness are, at the very least, highly debatable ... More recently, Campos has been a tireless, acerbic, and superbly articulate warrior in his extensive print and electronic media work."

Two years later, in 2012, Gard criticized Campos for overstating the empirical case for obesity skepticism, and for relying too much on criticisms of the motives of certain obesity researchers. In 2012, Gard wrote: "Paul Campos ... constantly use[s] words like 'myth', 'truth', 'lies' and 'liars' when writing about mainstream obesity science ... Obesity scientists are not 'liars', involved in a 'con' and they are not, by and large, hysterical. How easy it is to dismiss those with whom we disagree by calling them bad and mad." In 2012, Gard also concluded that Campos and other obesity skeptics have "had little if any impact on mainstream scientific and popular 'obesity crisis' discourse."

=== Blogs and other works ===
Campos's writing appears on the blog Lawyers, Guns and Money. In August 2011, Campos began a second blog, Inside the Law School Scam. Initially posting anonymously, he criticized other law school professors for not knowing enough doctrinal law or having much practical experience in legal practice. Knowing that his identity was soon to be outed, he claimed responsibility for the blog on August 21, 2011.

The blog has attracted criticism from legal scholars, including Brian Leiter of the University of Chicago Law School. According to Leiter, Campos's blog contained misleading, inaccurate, and inflammatory statements. Leiter also criticized Campos more broadly for allegedly shirking his job responsibilities through poor scholarship and poor teaching.

Campos's blog attracted support from Deborah Jones Merritt of the Ohio State University law school, who joined him as a co-blogger on "Inside the Law School Scam", as well as from Walter Olson at the libertarian Cato Institute. Merritt accused law professors of being "greedy", counseled students on whether to apply to or stay in law school, satirized the federal loan system, and suggested that law school administrators should be held accountable for unethical conduct. Olson has criticized law schools for being sources of influential liberal ideas and training grounds for future liberal political leaders.

In 2012, Campos self-published a book on law school, Don't Go to Law School (Unless).

In the spring of 2013, Campos, Tamanaha, and Merritt signed a letter to ABA Task Force on the future of legal education about the cost of legal education and the employment outcomes for new law graduates. The letter was also signed by several dozen other law professors.

== Bibliography ==
- Campos, Paul and Jonathan Chait (2004). "Sabermetrics for Football." The New York Times. December 12.
- (2004). "Paul Campos." Time.com. Retrieved September 12, 2007.
- (2007). "Paul Campos." University of Colorado Law School. Retrieved September 12, 2007.
