= Lookism =

Discrimination based on physical attractiveness

Lookism is the prejudice or discrimination toward people who are considered to be physically unattractive, and can include basing one's judgment of another person's other qualities, such as intelligence and abilities, on a person's physical appearance. It occurs in a variety of settings, including dating, social environments, and workplaces. Lookism has received less cultural attention than other forms of discrimination (such as racism and sexism) and typically does not have the legal protections that other forms often have, but it is still widespread and can significantly affect people's opportunities in terms of romantic relationships, job opportunities, and other realms of life. The same concept from the opposite angle is sometimes named pretty privilege.

Physical attractiveness is associated with positive qualities; in contrast, physical unattractiveness is associated with negative qualities. Many people make judgments of others based on their physical appearance, which influences how they respond to these people. Research on the "what is beautiful is good" stereotype shows that, overall, those who are physically attractive benefit from their good looks: physically attractive individuals are perceived moderately more positively and physical attractiveness has a moderate influence on judgement of a person's competence.

== Lexicology ==
Although the term "lookism" was coined relatively recently, cultures and traditions around the world have long warned against placing too much importance on physical appearance.

To judge by appearances is to get entangled in the Veil of Maya [in Buddhist thought] ... From ancient times until relatively recently, there was widespread worry about lookism, because the appearance of others may deceive, especially in romance, or it may be personally or politically imprudent to judge or act on appearances. Judging by appearances was prohibited by monotheistic religions ("no graven images") and criticized in ancient and medieval philosophies. Skeptics, Stoics, Cynics, Epicureans and Scholastics elaborated various reasons to avoid or subordinate the role of appearances.

The term lookism grew in popularity in the 1970s within the fat acceptance movement. It was used in The Washington Post in 1978, which asserted that the term was coined by fat people who created the word to refer to "discrimination based on looks." The word appears in several major English language dictionaries. There is some overlap between the terms fatphobia, teratophobia, cacophobia, racism and lookism.

In the 1990s, the term lookism was used by Smith College to warn incoming students of "lookism, a form of oppression, that involves putting too much stock in personal appearance."

== Empirical support ==
According to Nancy Etcoff, a psychologist at Massachusetts General Hospital, "we face a world where lookism is one of the most pervasive but denied prejudices". Referring to several studies, Angela Stalcup writes: "The evidence clearly indicates that not only is there a premium for prettiness in Western culture, there is also a penalty for plainness." When discrimination on the grounds of a person's appearance turns into fear or conveyed aversion, it is referred to as cacophobia. Sometimes cacophobia may be internalized and thus directed inwards rather than towards others.

Studies on newborns have found that human infants as young as 14 hours from birth prefer to look at attractive faces rather than unattractive faces. The preference also extends to non-human animals such as cats. These findings indicate that lookism is an innate product of how the human visual system functions.

Research by Dan Ariely found that American women exhibit a marked preference for dating taller men and that for shorter men to be judged attractive by women, they must earn substantially more money than taller men. Some research has suggested that the "beauty premium" for a job largely depends on whether or not attractiveness could potentially enhance productivity, such as those jobs which require substantial interpersonal interaction, while jobs that do not demand this see minimal or no beauty premium.

A study found that attractiveness in males correlated with more short-term (not long-term) partners, while in females it correlated with more long-term (not short-term) partners.

Men show a strong preference for physical attractiveness over intelligence when choosing a mate, as shown in a study conducted over data from a speed dating experiment. In a study with 4,573 adult participants it was shown that physical attractiveness is the most valued quality in women, even when considered outside of the context of mate selection.

Research indicates that more attractive individuals are at greater risk of being a victim of crime due to being involved in more social interaction, increasing their risk of exposure. Greater physical attractiveness can also lead individuals to be at greater risk of sexual abuse, regardless of gender.

Some writers have examined this phenomenon among gay men. According to Todd Morrison, author Michelangelo Signorile (in a 1997 overview of contemporary trends in the gay male community) described "body fascism" as

the setting of a rigid set of standards of physical beauty that pressures everyone within a particular group to conform to them. Any person who doesn't meet those very specific standards is deemed physically unattractive and sexually undesirable. In a culture in which the physical body is held in such high esteem and given such power, body fascism then not only deems those who don't or can't conform to be sexually less desirable, but in the extreme – sometimes dubbed "looksism" – also deems an individual completely worthless as a person, based solely on his exterior. In this sense it is not unlike racism or sexism or homophobia itself. ... (p. 28)

An October 2020 paper from University of Memphis examined the effects of instructors' attractiveness on student evaluations of their teaching.

A 2021 study on the effects of the wearing of facemasks in the hospitality industry corroborated existing findings on the correlation between perceived physical attractiveness of frontline workers and customer satisfaction. The study found that the wearing of facemasks by hospitality employees minimized the effects of their actual attractiveness on reported customer satisfaction, leveling off the playing field between average-looking employees and attractive-looking employees.

A 2023 study found that attractive victims of intimate partner violence are viewed as being more credible compared to less attractive victims.

== Appearance discrimination in employment ==
Physical appearance can influence employment opportunities, including hiring decisions and workplace expectations. Research on appearance-based discrimination has found that perceived physical attractiveness can affect recruitment outcomes even when applicants have comparable qualifications. These effects can vary across employment contexts and intersect with other characteristics, including gender and race.

=== Hiring and recruitment ===
Research conducted in Argentina has identified a relationship between facial attractiveness and employment opportunities. A field experiment in Buenos Aires involved the submission of 2,540 fictitious résumés in response to actual job advertisements. Applicants whose photographs were rated as attractive received 36% more callbacks than those whose photographs were rated as less attractive. Attractive applicants were also contacted sooner, indicating that appearance influenced employers' initial responses to applications.

A field experiment in Israel examined how physical attractiveness and gender influenced recruitment. The study submitted 5,312 résumés to 2,656 job openings, varying whether applications included photographs and the perceived attractiveness of the applicants. Attractive male applicants received more callbacks than less attractive male applicants and applicants without photographs. However, the same advantage was not observed among female applicants. Applications from women without photographs received higher callback rates than those containing photographs, regardless of perceived attractiveness.

These studies indicate that attractiveness can influence recruitment outcomes, although the direction and magnitude of the effects may differ by gender and hiring context. While attractive applicants received more favorable responses in the Argentine experiment, the Israeli experiment found different callback patterns for male and female applicants.

=== Intersection of appearance, race, and gender ===
Appearance-based discrimination can overlap with racial and gender inequalities in employment. Hiring decisions may reflect several applicant characteristics simultaneously, producing different employment outcomes among individuals with otherwise similar qualifications. Research examining these characteristics together has identified differences in how attractiveness, racialized surnames, and gender influence employers' responses.

A field experiment in Peru investigated the combined effects of physical attractiveness, race, and gender on access to employment. Researchers submitted 4,899 fictitious résumés to 1,247 job openings, randomly assigning photographs associated with different levels of perceived attractiveness and surnames associated with White or Quechua Indigenous backgrounds. The experiment found that physically attractive applicants received 82% more interview callbacks than similarly qualified applicants considered less attractive. Applicants with White-associated surnames received 54% more callbacks than those with Quechua-associated surnames, while male applicants received 34% more callbacks than female applicants.

The study also found that these forms of discrimination interacted with one another. The effects of physical attractiveness and race differed between male and female applicants, while gender-based differences varied across racial categories and levels of perceived attractiveness. These findings indicate that appearance-based discrimination may operate differently depending on an applicant's other social characteristics.

=== Appearance standards and aesthetic labor ===
Appearance-related expectations can also influence workplace practices after recruitment. In customer-facing industries, employers may establish standards concerning employees' clothing, grooming, physical presentation, and overall appearance. Research on retail and hospitality employment has examined how these requirements form part of organizational expectations and employee management.

The concept of aesthetic labor refers to employment practices in which workers' embodied characteristics and physical presentation are treated as part of the service they provide. In retail and hospitality workplaces, employers may consider employees' appearance relevant to organizational image and customer interactions. Aesthetic labor therefore includes expectations concerning how workers present themselves, rather than only the technical or interpersonal tasks they perform.

Research conducted in the United Kingdom examined aesthetic labor among employees in retail and hospitality establishments. Using survey and focus group data, the study investigated how appearance-related expectations influenced recruitment, employee image, uniforms, dress codes, and training. The findings identified physical presentation as an important aspect of interactive service work, alongside employees' interpersonal skills and attitudes.

Research on aesthetic labor has extended the study of appearance-based employment practices beyond initial hiring decisions to include organizational expectations about how employees present themselves during work. These studies demonstrate that physical appearance can be incorporated into both recruitment procedures and the ongoing requirements of customer-facing employment.

== In dating ==
Initial studies indicated that taller men are more likely to be married and to have more children, except in societies with severe sex imbalances caused by war. Research by Dan Ariely found that American women exhibit a marked preference for dating taller men, and that for shorter men to be judged attractive by women, they must earn substantially more money than taller men. Also, the perceived attractiveness of taller men may also apply to men of average height. A study showed that there is not a notable difference between the perceived attractiveness of taller men and average height men when compared to each other. Rather, it's that shorter men are more unfavorably viewed and the increased preference for the other two groups are a possible side effect.

A 2012 study of Indonesian men and women found that both men and women are willing to excuse height differences by using a trade-off approach. Men may compensate 1.3 BMI units with a 1 percent higher wage than their wife. Women may compensate 2 BMI units with an additional year of higher education. Furthermore, a 2015 study found that both men and women receive economic benefits from having a tall spouse.

Nonetheless, on a cultural level in post-industrial society, a sociological relationship between height and perceived attractiveness exists. For instance, in a 2019 survey performed by Ipsos in Hungary with over 500 respondents, the perfect height for men for 53% of participants was between 1.78 m (5 ft 10 in) to 1.85 m (6 ft 1 in), while regarding female ideal height, 60% of respondents stated that it should be between 1.65 m (5 ft 5 in) and 1.75 m (5 ft 9 in), indicating a predominant preference for average to moderately tall height in both sexes. A study produced by the Universities of Groningen and Valencia, found that the taller a man was, the less anxious he felt about attractive, physically dominant, and socially powerful rivals. This cultural characteristic of conferring relevance to height as an indicator of attractiveness, while applicable to the modernized world, is not a transcendental human quality.

== In politics ==
Lookism has been an issue in politics for centuries, with a long tradition in the United Kingdom of "mercilessly exaggerat[ing]" the physical flaws of politicians in newspaper cartoons. In the 1960 US Presidential race between John F. Kennedy and Richard Nixon, it was often believed that Kennedy's more conventionally handsome appearance contributed to his winning more approval in their first televised debate, but some researchers have challenged this widespread idea and argued that Kennedy's appearance had little or no influence. More broadly, research in countries such as Germany, Canada, the United States, and the United Kingdom has found that more attractive candidates benefit from their appearance by getting more votes in elections, and by being more often forgiven for scandals. In terms of vote choice, at least, the effect of lookism is not even across all contexts. Rather, it appears to primarily matter in cases where voters have low-information elections where voters may have little other to base their vote on (such as non-partisan elections with little media coverage), first-past-the-post elections where voters chose a single candidate, and in elections that are candidate-centered within a weak party system.

There are several variables that might contribute to the objectification of masculinity and femininity in politics. Scholar Charlotte Hooper argued that "gender intersects with other social divisions such as class, race and sexuality to produce complex hierarchies of (gendered) identities". Hooper argues that institutional practices, such as military combat in war, have greatly defined what it means to be a man. Furthermore, the symbolic dimension, which includes sports, media, current affairs, etc. has "disseminate[d] a wealth of popular iconography which links Western masculinities to the wider world beyond the borders of the state". This is where the ideology of lookism is firmly entrenched according to Hooper. Similarly, Laura Shepherd suggests that men are required to fit into the "matrix of intelligibility" by acting a certain way, dressing a certain way, and have a mentality that is devoid of emotion or anything effeminate; if they are successful in becoming the ultimate "man's man" then they are virtually untouchable. However, others have suggested that there is only an explicit interest in the analysis of masculinity within this political sphere, it will be impossible to develop a reliable analysis of femininity within this same sphere.

Drawing examples from Madeleine Albright's TED talk in 2010, "On Being a Woman and Diplomat", Albright expressed her frustrations with how her male colleagues and media commentators would pick apart her appearance. Being the first female Secretary of State for the United States, Albright was in the spotlight on the domestic and international stage; everything from her age, weight, hairstyle, and choice of dress were scrutinized; yet ironically, the policy positions she believed to be her most important accomplishments (initiation of the G7, attempts to promote gender equality, etc.) were hardly taken into account. The fact that Albright's general appearance did not fit into the narrow category of "attractive" made it even more difficult for her to navigate the space between being a woman and a diplomat. Albright is not the only woman in a position of power, or otherwise, that has been discriminated against because of her appearance. An article published in The Washington Post in 2005 labeled Secretary of State Condoleezza Rice as a "dominatrix" when she stepped out in knee-high black-heeled boots during a visit to Wiesbaden Military Base in Germany. Although the article was meant to give credit to Rice for "challeng[ing] expectations and assumptions", some argue that the article gave her a hyper-sexualized image, and further removed the audience from focusing on the purpose of her visit to the military place. Similarly, media commentators have often chosen to report on Hillary Clinton's "man suits" and Julia Gillard's short hairstyle, instead of focusing on these women's professional accomplishments. Sarah Palin, former governor of Alaska and 2008 Republican Vice-Presidential candidate, was the subject of much media attention due to her conventionally attractive appearance, with Palin suggesting that the focus on her appearance ignored her professional and policy accomplishments.

== Related forms of prejudice ==
Lookism has received scholarly attention both from a cultural studies and an economics perspective. In the former context, lookism relates to preconceived notions of beauty and cultural stereotyping based on appearance as well as gender roles and expectations. Historically, Eugenic, White supremacist, and Social Darwinist movements espoused a pseudoscientific connection between phenotypical physical appearance and supposed heritable superiority in terms of social constructs such as intelligence, and social status. Prejudice based on physical appearance is an important component of intersectional identities and discrimination, mediated through racism, ageism (young over old), social class, and weight. Putative explanations of this mediated effect posit that wealth allows for more free time and money to work on their appearance, higher access to fitness activities, and improved nutrition. Important economic considerations include the question of income gaps based on looks, as the perceived productivity of workers can be biased by a manager's perceptions of the workers physical appearance. Judging people on the basis of attractiveness decreases a person's self-esteem leading to a negative self-image.

== Ethics ==
In the article "Is Lookism Unjust?", authors Louis Tietje and Steven Cresap discuss when discrimination based on looks can legitimately be described as unjust. Tietje and Cresap quote evidence that suggests there exists "a 7–to–9 percent 'penalty' for being in the lowest 9 percent of looks among all workers and a 5 percent 'premium' for being in the top 33 percent". While accepting that the evidence indicates that such discrimination does occur, the authors argue that it has been pervasive throughout history and that judgments of aesthetics appear to be a biological adaptation (rather than culturally conditioned) to aid reproduction, survival, and social interaction, allowing people to determine viable mates (level of attractiveness being indicative of health) and the status of others as "friend or enemy, threat or opportunity". The authors also argue that if physical attractiveness can improve a company's success, then awarding people for it is justifiable [from a purely profit motivated POV], as the trait is thus relevant to the job and discrimination only occurs when irrelevant traits are used. In addition, the authors question the practicality of both redressing any injustices based on lookism and of determining whether such injustices have in fact occurred. Thus the authors conclude that there can be no clear model of injustice in such discrimination, nor would legislation to address it be practicable – "We do not see how any policy interventions to redress beauty discrimination can be justified."

Nancy Etcoff, author of Survival of the Prettiest, argues that human preference for attractiveness is rooted in evolutionary instinct and that trying to prevent it from influencing people would be "telling them to stop enjoying food or sex or novelty or love" and thus argues that "being beautiful and being prized for it is not a social evil."

== Law ==
=== United States ===
Until the 1970s, lookism in the United States was sometimes codified into law. In many jurisdictions, so-called "ugly laws" barred people from appearing in public if they had diseases or disfigurements that were considered unsightly. Today, the Equal Employment Opportunity Commission considers extreme obesity to be a disability protected by the Americans with Disabilities Act, and a few cities protect against discrimination based on appearance. Otherwise, there is no federal law protecting against discrimination based on physical appearance.

=== Belgium ===
In the Antidiscriminatiewet/Loi anti-discrimination (Anti-Discrimination Law) of May 10, 2007, there is a provision that says that one is not allowed to discriminate against people based on their physical or genetic characteristics.

== See also ==
- Attributional ambiguity
- Body privilege
- Colorism
- Texturism
- Heightism
- Elephant man
- Egalitarianism
- Fat acceptance movement
- Halo effect
- Human physical appearance
- Implicit bias
- Physical attractiveness stereotype
- Prison plastic surgery – Plastic surgery provided to prison inmates for social rehabilitation
- Sexual capital
- Sexual field
- Sexual objectification
- Sexual selection
- Social stigma
- Stigma (sociological theory)
- Ugliness
- Women-are-wonderful effect
- Eugenics
- Intersectionality

=== Animals ===
- Black dog syndrome
- Breed-specific legislation

=== Fiction ===
- Liking What You See: A Documentary
- Lookism (manhwa)
