= January Harshe =

American author and public speaker

January Harshe (January 20, 1979) is an American author, motivational speaker, and body positive advocate. She is the author of Birth Without Fear: The Judgement-Free Guide to Taking Charge of Your Pregnancy, Birth, and Postpartum, published by Hachette Books on March 5, 2019. She is the founder of Birth Without Fear, an online resource that provides information about pregnancy, childbirth, postpartum, and motherhood, and the creator of the Take Back Postpartum Instagram account.

Harshe began Birth Without Fear in 2010. It was initially a Facebook page. In early 2013 she began speaking at mothering conventions, and later that year held the first Birth Without Fear Conference. She subsequently organized Birth Without Fear MeetUps around the United States, and smaller events called Find Your Village Gatherings. In 2015 she created the body positive Take Back Postpartum Instagram account. Harshe began The Harshē Podcast with her husband Brandon in 2017.
