= Horn effect =

Form of cognitive bias

The horn effect, closely related to the halo effect, is a form of cognitive bias that causes one's perception of another to be unduly influenced by a single negative trait. An example of the horn effect may be that an observer is more likely to assume a physically unattractive person is morally inferior to an attractive person, despite the lack of relationship between morality and physical appearance.

== Etymology ==
The term is derived from the word "horn" and refers to the devil's horns. This is in contrast to the word halo and the halo effect, based on the concept of a saint's halo.

In a 1920 study published by Thorndike that focused on the halo effect, it was noted that "ratings were apparently affected by a marked tendency to think of the person in general as rather good or rather interior [sic] (Note: "inferior") and to color the judgments of the qualities by this general feeling". (Note: Although not popularizing the actual term Horn effect.)

It is sometimes called the horns effect, reverse-halo effect, or devil effect.

== Bias in action ==
The horn effect occurs when "individuals believe that negative traits are connected to each other." It is a phenomenon in which an observer's judgment of a person is adversely affected by the presence of (for the observer) an unfavorable aspect of this person.

- The Guardian wrote of the devil effect in relation to Hugo Chavez: "Some leaders can become so demonised that it's impossible to assess their achievements and failures in a balanced way."
- The relation of crime to attractiveness is also subject to the halo effect. A study presented two hypothetical crimes: a burglary and a swindle. The burglary involved a woman illegally obtaining a key and stealing $2,200; the swindle involved a woman manipulating a man to invest $2,200 in a nonexistent corporation. The results showed that when the offense was not related to attractiveness (as in the burglary) the unattractive defendant was punished more severely than the attractive one. However, when the offense was related to attractiveness (the swindle), the attractive defendant was punished more severely than the unattractive one. The study imputes that the usual leniency given to the attractive woman (as a result of the halo effect) was negated or reversed when the nature of the crime involved her looks.

== See also ==
- Splitting (psychology)
