= Halo effect =

Tendency for positive impressions to contaminate other evaluations

The halo effect (sometimes called the halo error or halo fallacy), a term coined by Edward Thorndike, is the tendency for positive impressions of one aspect of a person or entity to encourage a positive perspective on that subject's other aspects. It is "the name given to the phenomenon whereby evaluators tend to be influenced by their previous judgments of performance or personality;" in other words, it is a cognitive bias that can prevent people from forming an image based on the sum of all circumstances at hand.

A simplified example of the halo effect could be when people, after noticing that an individual in a photograph is attractive, well groomed, and properly attired, then assumes, using a mental heuristic based on the rules of their own social concept, that the person in the photograph is a good person. This constant error in judgment is reflective of the evaluators' preferences, prejudices, ideology, aspirations, and social perception.

== Context and applications ==
=== Psychology ===
The term halo effect is used in psychology to describe a perception distortion that affects the way people interpret the information about others with whom they have formed a positive gestalt. For example, they find out that someone with whom they have formed a positive gestalt has cheated on his taxes; but because of the positive gestalt, they may dismiss the significance of this behavior or even think the person simply made a mistake. The halo effect refers to the tendency to evaluate an individual positively on many traits because of a shared belief.

It is a type of immediate judgment discrepancy, or cognitive bias, in which a person making an initial assessment of another person, place, or thing will assume ambiguous information based on concrete information. The halo effect is an evaluation by an individual and can affect the perception of a decision, action, idea, business, person, group, entity, or other whenever concrete data is generalized or influences ambiguous information.

The halo effect can also be explained as the behavior (usually unconscious) of using evaluations based on unrelated criteria to make judgments about something or someone. The halo effect is sometimes used to refer specifically to when this behavior has a positive correlation, such as viewing someone who is attractive as likely to be successful and popular. When this judgment has a negative connotation, however, such as when someone unattractive is more readily blamed for a crime than someone attractive, it is sometimes referred to as the horn effect.

=== Marketing ===
The term halo effect is used in marketing to explain consumer bias toward certain products because of favorable experience with other products made by the same company. It is used in the part of brand marketing called "line extensions." One common halo effect is when the perceived positive features of a particular item extend to a broader brand. A notable example is the manner in which the popularity of Apple's iPod generated enthusiasm for the corporation's other products. Advertising often makes use of television shows, movies and those who star in them, to promote products via the halo effect.

In the automotive industry, exotic, limited-production luxury models or low-volume sports cars made by a manufacturer's racing, motorsports, or in-house modification teams, are sometimes referred to as "halo cars" for the effect they are intended to produce on selling other vehicles within the make. To contrast this with the automotive terminology "flagship model" (see flagship car).

In the wine industry, certain wine features create a halo effect that can influence the customer's opinion of a given wine. The inclusion of the category "organic" on the label of a wine can increase the consumer's positive valuation of the wine. Organic wines are conceived of as being healthy, having a better taste, scent, and color, and resulting in a higher degree of overall satisfaction. Another example of the halo effect in the wine industry is the association of traditional corks with wine quality: corked bottles are systematically rated as of higher quality than bottles that use screw caps and plastic caps since the latter are viewed as signifiers of low-quality wines.

Advertising in one channel has been shown to have a halo effect on advertising in another channel.

A halo effect with regard to health, dubbed a "health halo," is used in food marketing to increase sales of a product; it can result in increased consumption of the product in the halo, which may be unhealthy.

The term "halo effect" has also been applied to human rights organizations that have used their status to move away from their stated goals. Political scientist Gerald Steinberg has claimed that non-governmental organizations (NGOs) take advantage of the halo effect and are "given the status of impartial moral watchdogs" by governments and the news media.

The Ronald McDonald House, a widely known NGO, openly celebrates the positive outcomes it receives from the halo effect. The web page for the Ronald McDonald House in Durham, North Carolina, states that 95% of survey participants were aware of Ronald McDonald House Charities. This awareness is attributed to the halo effect, as employees, customers, and stakeholders are more likely to be involved in a charity that they recognize and trust, with a name and logo that are familiar.

A brand's halo effect can protect its reputation in the event of a crisis. An event that is detrimental to a brand that is viewed favorably would not be as threatening or damaging to a brand that consumers view unfavorably.

=== Other uses ===
Non-psychology/business use of the term "halo effect" describes the monetary value of the spillover effect (Note: related to Net Present Value) when an organization's marketing budget is subsequently reduced. (Note: The loss of recency is compensated from the effective frequency of advertising expenditures of prior periods.) This was first demonstrated to students via the 1966 version of a textbook and a software package named "The Marketing Game." (Note: The textbook has been revised more than once, and the mainframe program from 1966 is now a PC program.)

The halo effect can also be used in the case of institutions, as one's favorable perceptions regarding an aspect of an organization could determine a positive view of its entire operations. For example, if a hospital is known for its excellent open heart and cardiac program, then the community would expect it to excel in other areas as well. This can also be demonstrated in the positive perceptions of financial institutions that gained favorable coverage in the media due to meteoric growth but eventually failed afterward.

The term "halo effect" is also used in metal detecting to denote the enhanced ability of a metal item or coin to be detectable when it has been left undisturbed for some period of time in wet soil. The object can leach some metallic properties into the soil, making it more detectable. The area surrounding the object is called its "halo."

== History ==
The halo effect was originally identified in 1907 by the American psychologist Frederick L. Wells (1884–1964). However, it was only officially recognized in 1920 with empirical evidence provided by the psychologist Edward Thorndike (1874–1949). Edward Thorndike was the first to say the halo effect is a specific cognitive bias in which one aspect of the person, brand, product, or institution affects one's thoughts or judgment of the entity's other aspects or dimensions. Thorndike, an early behaviorist, was an important contributor to the study of the psychology of learning. He gave the phenomenon its name in his 1920 article "A Constant Error in Psychological Ratings." In "Constant Error," Thorndike set out to replicate the study in hopes of pinning down the bias that he thought was present in these ratings. Subsequent researchers have studied it in relation to attractiveness and its bearing on the judicial and educational systems. Thorndike originally coined the term referring only to people; however, its use has been greatly expanded, especially in the area of brand marketing.

=== Supporting evidence ===
In Thorndike's words, "Ratings were apparently affected by a marked tendency to think of the person in general as rather good or rather inferior and to color the judgments of the qualities by this general feeling." In "A Constant Error in Psychological Ratings," Thorndike asked two commanding officers to evaluate their soldiers in terms of physical qualities (neatness, voice, physique, bearing, and energy), intellect, leadership skills, and personal qualities (including dependability, loyalty, responsibility, selflessness, and cooperation). In Thorndike's study, attractiveness plays an important role in how people tend to consider a person, such as whether a person is friendly or not based on their physical appearance. His goal was to see how the ratings of one characteristic affected other characteristics.

Thorndike's study showed how there was too great a correlation in the commanding officers' responses. In his review, he stated, "The correlations are too high and too even. For example, for the three raters next studied[,] the average correlation for physique with intelligence is .31; for physique with leadership, .39; and for physique with character, .28." The ratings of one of the special qualities of an officer often started a trend in the rating results. The halo effect is not an indication of the existence of a correlation, but instead indicates that the correlation is too high. Thorndike used the halo effect to describe both a positive and negative halo.

In 2023, a large study of 2748 participants found that the same individuals received significantly higher ratings of intelligence, trustworthiness, sociability and happiness after having applied a beauty filter. It found a correlation of .30 for intelligence, .20 for trustworthiness, .39 for sociability and .39 for happiness. However, the study also found that beautified men received significantly higher scores to their perceived intelligence compared to women.

=== Impression formation ===
Humans form impressions of other humans quickly and intuitively based on personality traits that they are given. In a seminal study on impression formation, Solomon Asch (1946) developed a series of experiments testing his theory that when people are given information about another person's individual traits, these traits will combine or "add up" to create a unified impression. Notably, these individual traits are organized around key/central traits, such as "warm" and "cold", that combine to generate a "radiating" effect on how raters will perceive and interpret the other traits.

Participants were given two separate lists of traits describing two fictional people and were identical except for one central trait: if the person was described as also being warm or cold. Asch found that the group of participants who heard a person described as "warm" were perceived as being a positive person and the group of participants who heard a person described as "cold" were perceived as a negative person. This study showed how humans are strongly influenced by the central traits of "warm" and "cold" because a) these central traits may lead one to infer similar traits (i.e. She is warm, therefore she must also be kind, smart, and helpful) and b) these central traits may influence the perception of the surrounding traits given (i.e. She is warm, that means if she is described as intelligent this will mean more than if she was described as "cold" and "intelligent").

Asch interpreted these effects in Gestaltian terms: humans engage in holistic formations of impressions that are not simply additive of traits but are integrations of traits that form a unified judgment of another person based on one's expectations. A strong positive or negative trait will shape how individuals perceive all other traits and judgments of another person.

== Cognitive bias ==
Cognitive bias is a pattern in perception, interpretation, or judgment that consistently leads to an individual misunderstanding something about themselves or their social environment, leading to poor decision-making or irrational behavior. The halo effect is classified as a cognitive bias because the halo effect is a perception error that distorts the way a person sees someone, and cognitive bias is a perception error that distorts the way that people see themselves.

The term "halo" is used in analogy with the religious concept: a glowing circle crowning the heads of saints in countless medieval and Renaissance paintings, bathing the saint's face in heavenly light. The observer may be subject to overestimating the worth of the observed by the presence of a quality that adds light on the whole, like a halo. In other words, observers tend to bend their judgment according to one patent characteristic of the person (the "halo") or a few of his traits, generalizing toward a judgment of that person's character (e.g., in the literal hagiologic case, "entirely good and worthy").

The effect works in both positive and negative directions (and is hence sometimes called the horns and halo effect). If the observer likes one aspect of something, they will have a positive predisposition toward everything about it. If the observer dislikes one aspect of something, they will have a negative predisposition toward everything about it.

== Role of attractiveness ==
A person's attractiveness has also been found to produce a halo effect. Attractiveness contributes to the halo effect because it can be influenced by several specific traits. These perceptions of attractiveness may affect judgments tied to personality traits. Physical attributes contribute to perceptions of attractiveness (e.g., physique, hair, eye color). For example, someone who is perceived as attractive, due in part to physical traits, may be more likely to be perceived as kind or intelligent. The role of attractiveness in producing the halo effect has been illustrated through a number of studies. Recent research, for example, has revealed that attractiveness may affect perceptions tied to life success and personality. In this study, attractiveness was correlated with weight, indicating that attractiveness itself may be influenced by various specific traits. Trustworthiness and friendliness were included in the personality variables. People perceived as being more attractive were more likely to be perceived as trustworthy and friendly. What this suggests is that perceptions of attractiveness may influence a variety of other traits, which supports the concept of the halo effect.

=== On personality ===
People's first impressions of others influence their later decision to either approach or avoid those individuals. When people first encounter someone, the information present about that individual is limited; therefore, people will use the information available to assume other characteristics about that person; for instance, observable behaviors such as eye contact, leaning forward, smiling and positive hand gestures (ex. steepling hands) are linked to positive emotions, while avoiding eye contact, leaning back, avoiding touch, and defensive hand gestures (ex. hands in pockets) or no gestures at all are linked to feelings of detachment. Besides that, another popular example used when referring to the halo effect is the phenomenon called the attractiveness stereotype or when encountering individuals who are similar to others in some aspects, like personality or life history like the school they attended. People tend to assume that physically attractive individuals are more likely to be more healthy, successful, courteous, containing higher moral standards, and greater social competence than other people; on the other hand, the attractiveness stereotype can also carry a negative connotation as some people may think of attractive people as less honest and more conceited than others.

Dion, Berscheid & Walster (1972) conducted a study on the relationship between attractiveness and the halo effect. Sixty students, thirty males and thirty females from the University of Minnesota took part in the experiment. Each subject was given three different photos to examine: one of an attractive individual, one of an individual of average attractiveness, and one of an unattractive individual. The participants judged the photos' subjects along 27 different personality traits (including altruism, conventionality, self-assertiveness, stability, emotionality, trustworthiness, extraversion, kindness, and sexual promiscuity). Participants were then asked to predict the overall happiness the photos' subjects would feel for the rest of their lives, including marital happiness (least likely to get divorced), parental happiness (most likely to be a good parent), social and professional happiness (most likely to experience life fulfillment), and overall happiness. Finally, participants were asked if the subjects would hold a job of high status, medium status, or low status. Results showed that most of the participants overwhelmingly believed more attractive subjects have more socially desirable personality traits than either averagely attractive or unattractive subjects, would lead happier lives in general, have happier marriages, and have more career success, including holding more secure, prestigious jobs. Participants, however, believed that attractive individuals would be worse parents than both averagely-attractive and unattractive individuals.

==== Moral traits ====
A recent study by Klebl and colleagues (2022) built onto the "beauty-Is-good" stereotype, specifically looking at the role of attractiveness in influencing moral attributions. The study posited that moral traits are especially likely to be influenced by a target's physical/facial attractiveness because moral traits are crucial in person perception. Three domains of moral exemplarity were used in moral vs. non-moral traits: just, bravery, and caring. Two studies were employed to investigate whether moral traits were more strongly linked to physical attractiveness than non-moral traits, and investigated if those effects were due to the traits' warmth.

Results showed that participants especially attribute moral traits to attractive people than attributing positive non-moral traits. Additionally, this greater effect was found not to be caused by the traits' warmth. The findings of this study suggest that a target's moral character is strongly biased by the "beauty-is-good" stereotype than non-moral trait attributions.

=== Academics and intelligence ===
A study by Landy & Sigall (1974) demonstrated the Halo Effect, looking at male judgments of female intelligence and competence on academic tasks. Sixty male undergraduate students rated the quality of essays which included both well- and poorly-written samples. One third were presented with a photo of an attractive female as author, another third with that of an unattractive female as author, and the last third were shown neither. On average, most of the participants gave significantly better writing evaluations for the more attractive author. On a scale of 1 to 9, the well-written essay by the attractive author received an average of 6.7 while the unattractive author received a 5.9 (with a 6.6 as a control). The gap was larger on the poor essay: the attractive author received an average of 5.2, the control a 4.7, and the unattractive author a 2.7, suggesting male readers are generally more willing to give physically attractive females the benefit of the doubt when performance is below standard than those not considered attractive.

Research conducted by Moore, Filippou & Perrett (2011) sought residual cues to intelligence in female and male faces while attempting to control for the attractiveness halo effect. Over 300 photographs of Caucasian British college students were rated for perceived intelligence. The photographs that were scored lowest in perceived intelligence were used to create a low-intelligence composite face and those photographs that were scored highest in perceived intelligence were used to create a high-intelligence composite face. Both female and male faces of high- and low-perceived intelligence were created, resulting in four groups of composite faces. Participants for the study were recruited online; 164 female and 92 male heterosexual residents of the UK rated each of the composite faces for intelligence and attractiveness. Of the female composites, attractiveness seemed to be controlled as both the high- and low-perceived intelligence groups were rated as equally attractive. However, of the male face composites, the high-perceived intelligence group was rated as significantly more attractive than the low-perceived intelligence group, suggesting that either the authors could not adequately control for the attractiveness halo effect for the male composite photographs or that intelligence is an integral factor of attractiveness in high-intelligence male faces. The second part of the study found that the composites in the high-perceived intelligence group were rated highest in the factors of friendly and funny as markers of intelligence in both the female and male groups. While intelligence does not seem to be a factor that contributes to attractiveness in women, with regards to men, attractive faces are perceived to be more intelligent, friendly, and funny by women and men.

=== Political effects ===
Officeholders who create what The New York Times called "a living legacy" benefit from a halo effect when their overall accomplishments are subsequently evaluated. (Note: The Times was referring to F. D. Roosevelt and Ronald Reagan)

Researchers have shown that perceived physical and vocal attractiveness (or their opposite) lead to bias in judgment. A 2010 study found that attractiveness and familiarity are strong predictors of decisions regarding who is put in a position of leadership. Judgments made following one-second exposures to side-by-side photos of two US congressional candidates were reasonably predictive of election outcomes. Similar studies (Palmer & Peterson 2012) found that even when taking factual knowledge into account, candidates who were rated as more attractive were still perceived as more knowledgeable. Thus, beauty evaluations also emerge as major predictors of electoral success.

=== The judicial context ===
Study results showing the influence of the halo effect in the judicial context exist:

- Efran (1974) found subjects were more lenient when sentencing attractive individuals than unattractive ones, even though exactly the same crime was committed. The researchers attributed the result to a societal perception that people with a high level of attractiveness are seen as more likely to have successful futures due to corresponding socially desirable traits.
- Monahan (1941) studied social workers who were accustomed to interacting with a diverse range of people and found that the majority experienced difficulty when asked to consider that a beautiful person was guilty of a crime.
- A study presented two hypothetical crimes: a burglary and a swindle. The burglary involved a woman illegally obtaining a key and stealing $2,200 (equivalent to $13,000 today); the swindle involved a woman manipulating a man to invest $2,200 in a nonexistent corporation. The results showed that when the offense was not related to attractiveness (as in the burglary) the unattractive defendant was punished more severely than the attractive one. However, when the offense was related to attractiveness (the swindle), the attractive defendant was punished more severely than the unattractive one. The study imputes that the usual leniency given to the attractive woman (as a result of the halo effect) was negated or reversed when the nature of the crime involved her looks.

=== Gender differences ===
Kaplan (1978) found that some women were influenced by the halo effect on attractiveness only when presented with members of the opposite sex. Dermer & Thiel (1975) continued this line of research, going on to demonstrate that jealousy of an attractive individual has a slight effect in evaluation of that person. These works showed these halo effect more prevalent among females than males. Later research by Moore, Filippou & Perrett (2011) was able to control for attractiveness in composite photographs of females who were perceived to be of high or low intelligence, while showing that the attractiveness halo effect was seen in high intelligent male composite faces by heterosexual residents of the UK. Either the halo effect is negated by feelings of jealousy in women or the halo effect is lessened when women are looking at same sex individuals or the attractiveness halo effect can be controlled for in women.

=== Possible causes ===
Rating error effect, mistakes made by raters when they use a rating scale, reflect the task competence of the rater, as well as the rater's sex, social position, race, religion, and age. Researchers showed that halo effect is one component of this error. Fisicaro and Lance introduced three explanatory models. The first model named the general impression model states that global evaluation affects the rating of individual characteristics. The salient dimension model states that how people perceive an individual characteristic affects their evaluation of other characteristics. The inadequate discrimination model refers to the rater's failure to identify different behaviors of the person being evaluated.

== The reverse halo effect ==
The reverse halo effect occurs when positive evaluations of an individual cause negative consequences. Rater errors pose special problems for the issues of reliability and validity. Furthermore, ratings that differ in time may accurately reflect a change in behavior even though this difference would demonstrate an artificial lack of reliability. A follow-up study with both men and women participants supported this, as well as showing that attractive women were expected to be conceited and have a higher socioeconomic status. Eagly et al. (1991) also commented on this phenomenon, showing that more attractive individuals of both sexes were expected to be higher in vanity and possibly egotistic. Applied instances of the reverse halo effect include negative evaluations of criminals who use their attractiveness to their advantage and rating a philosophical essay lower when written by a young female than an old male.

== The horn effect ==
A negative form of the halo effect, called the horn effect, the devil effect, or the reverse halo effect, allows a disliked trait or aspect of a person or product to negatively influence overall perception. Psychologists call it a "bias blind spot:" "Individuals believe (that negative) traits are inter-connected." due to a negative first impression. The Guardian wrote of the devil effect in relation to Hugo Chavez: "Some leaders can become so demonized that it's impossible to assess their achievements and failures in a balanced way." For those seen in a negative light, anything they do that is negative is exemplified, while the positive things they do are not seen, or are doubted.

== Education ==
Abikoff et al. (1993) found the halo effect is also present in the classroom. In this study, both regular and special education elementary school teachers watched videotapes of what they believed to be children in regular 4th-grade classrooms. In reality, the children were actors, depicting behaviors present in attention deficit hyperactivity disorder (ADHD), oppositional defiant disorder (ODD), or standard behavior. The teachers were asked to rate the frequency of hyperactive behaviors observed in the children. Teachers rated hyperactive behaviors accurately for children with ADHD; however, the ratings of hyperactivity were much higher for the children with ODD-like behaviors, showing a horn effect for children who appeared to have ODD.

Foster & Ysseldyke (1976) also found the halo effect present in teachers' evaluations of children. Regular and special education elementary school teachers watched videos of a normal child whom they were told was either "emotionally disturbed," possessing a learning disorder, "mentally retarded," or "normal." The teachers then completed referral forms based on the child's behavior. The results showed that teachers held negative expectancies toward emotionally disturbed children, maintaining these expectancies even when presented with normal behavior. In addition, the "mentally retarded" label showed a greater degree of negative bias than the "emotionally disturbed" or "learning disabled" label.

=== Observations ===
"In the classroom, teachers are subject to the halo effect rating error when evaluating their students. For example, a teacher who sees a well-behaved student might tend to assume this student is also bright, diligent, and engaged before that teacher has objectively evaluated the student's capacity in these areas. When these types of halo effects occur, they can affect students' approval ratings in certain areas of functioning and can even affect students' grades."

"In the work setting, the halo effect is most likely to show up in a supervisor's appraisal of a subordinate's job performance. In fact, the halo effect is probably the most common bias in performance appraisal. Think about what happens when a supervisor evaluates the performance of a subordinate. The supervisor may give prominence to a single characteristic of the employee, such as enthusiasm, and allow the entire evaluation to be colored by how he or she judges the employee on that one characteristic. Even though the employee may lack the requisite knowledge or ability to perform the job successfully, if the employee's work shows enthusiasm, the supervisor may very well give him or her a higher performance rating than is justified by knowledge or ability."

== Further research findings ==
Murphy, Jako & Anhalt (1993) argue: "Since 1980, there have been a large number of studies dealing directly or indirectly with halo error in rating. Taken together, these studies suggest that all seven of the characteristics that have defined halo error for much of its history are problematic and that the assumptions that underlie some of them are demonstrably wrong." Their work claims that the assumption that the halo effect is always detrimental is incorrect, with some halo effects resulting in an increase in the accuracy of the rating. Additionally, they discuss the idea of "true halo"—the actual correlation between, for example, attractiveness and performance as an instructor—and "illusory halo," which refers to cognitive distortions, errors in observation and judgment, and the rating tendencies of the individual rater. They claim that any true differentiation between true and illusory halos is impossible in a real-world setting, because the different ratings are strongly influenced by the specific behaviors of the person observed by the raters.

A study by Forgas (2011) states that one's mood can affect the degree of the halo effect's influence. When someone is in a favorable mood, the halo effect is more likely to be influential—this was demonstrated by study participants choosing between pictures of an elderly man with a beard and a young woman, and deciding which subject possessed more philosophical attributes. Additionally, when asked to list the happy, neutral, or negative times in their life, the halo effect was more evident in the perceptions of the participants who chose to write about happy prior experiences. Forgas's study suggests that when one is gauging the extent of the halo effect in a situation, one must consider the emotional state of the person making the judgment.

A 2013 report on "the link between disease and leader preferences" claimed that "congressional districts with a higher incidence of disease" were more likely to show a halo effect "on electoral outcomes."

== See also ==
- Ad hominem
- Affect heuristic
- Association fallacy
- Attribute substitution
- Body privilege
- Dr. Fox effect
- Dunning–Kruger effect
- In-group favoritism
- Illusory superiority
- List of cognitive biases
- Lookism
- Team error

== Bibliography ==
- Abikoff, Howard; Courtney, Mary; Pelham, William E.; Koplewicz, Harold S. (October 1993). "Teachers' ratings of disruptive behaviors: The influence of halo effects". Journal of Abnormal Child Psychology. 21 (5): 519–533. doi:10.1007/BF00916317. PMID 8294651. S2CID 46270488.
- Dion, Karen; Berscheid, Ellen; Walster, Elaine (1972). "What is beautiful is good". Journal of Personality and Social Psychology. 24 (3): 285–290. doi:10.1037/h0033731. PMID 4655540. S2CID 10152052.
- Efran, Michael G. (June 1974). "The effect of physical appearance on the judgment of guilt, interpersonal attraction, and severity of recommended punishment in a simulated jury task". Journal of Research in Personality. 8 (1): 45–54. doi:10.1016/0092-6566(74)90044-0.
- Foster, Glen; Ysseldyke, James (January 1976). "Expectancy and halo effects as a result of artificially induced teacher bias". Contemporary Educational Psychology. 1 (1): 37–45. doi:10.1016/0361-476X(76)90005-9.
- Kanazawa, Satoshi; Kobar, Jody L. (May 2004). "Why beautiful people are more intelligent". Intelligence. 32 (3): 227–243. doi:10.1016/j.intell.2004.03.003.
- Landy, David; Sigall, Harold (1974). "Beauty is talent: Task evaluation as a function of the performer's physical attractiveness". Journal of Personality and Social Psychology. 29 (3): 299–304. doi:10.1037/h0036018.
- Monahan, F. (1941). Women in Crime. New York: Washburn.
- Murphy, Kevin R.; Jako, Robert A.; Anhalt, Rebecca L. (April 1993). "Nature and consequences of halo error: A critical analysis". Journal of Applied Psychology. 78 (2): 218–225. doi:10.1037/0021-9010.78.2.218. S2CID 6394309.
- Palmer, Carl L.; Peterson, Rolfe D. (2012). Beauty and the Pollster: Interviewer Bias in Subjective Evaluations of Respondent Characteristics (PDF). Annual Meeting of the Midwest Political Science Association. Chicago IL. Archived from the original (PDF) on 2014-03-09.
- Thorndike, E.L. (1920). "A constant error in psychological ratings". Journal of Applied Psychology. 4 (1): 25–29. doi:10.1037/h0071663.
