= Pretty privilege =

Social concept

Pretty privilege is the tendency for people who are viewed as more attractive or "pretty" to receive more opportunities, benefits, attention, or other perks than their less attractive counterparts. The concept of pretty privilege does not have a founding figure but rather emerged through online feminist discourse about how women are expected to be attractive, especially relative to men. With the proliferation of large scale social media platforms that focus on physical attractiveness and greater discussion of social dynamics on platforms like TikTok, pretty privilege has become an increasingly common term. Pretty privilege can be seen in its effects on career trajectory, social acceptance, legal aid, and gender dynamics.

== Related concepts ==
=== Body privilege ===
Body privilege is a concept used to examine the economic, social, and political advantages or benefits that are made to both men and women based solely on their physical attractiveness. The term was borrowed from Peggy McIntosh's idea of white privilege and evolved into the idea that privilege could also be based on a person's body size. Samantha Kwan coined the term "body privilege" and explains how it affects some people's everyday life. For example, in some cases a person's body is seen as an indicator of a person's intelligence. A person's body can also be a deciding factor on employment decisions such as hiring and promoting. However, some may say that privilege may only apply in unchangeable circumstances, such as race and not in cases that are under the control of the influenced. For this reason, the very idea of body privilege remains debated.

The term "body privilege" indicates that there are social benefits to fitting the standard image. Even though the term is a relatively new concept, concepts such as the stigmatization of obesity and sizeism goes far back. In terms of workplace environments, the University of Connecticut Rudd Center found that employees that possess features such as higher body weight often face "unfair hiring practices, lower wages, fewer promotions, harassment from co-workers, and unfair job termination". Alternatively, Kwan also states that physical attractiveness is a determining factor in the hiring process. Those who are deemed as conventionally attractive are stereotyped as individuals who are more intelligent and seen as those who have happier marriages, and generally lead better lives.

=== Halo effect ===
The halo effect posits that a positive impression of a subject will positively influence one's other impressions of that subject. The term was first introduced by Edward Thorndike in his 1920 paper, "A constant error in psychological ratings". Nisbet & Wilson (1977) broadened the term's understanding to also include that the same tendency occurs when people are the subject as well.

=== Physical attractiveness stereotype ===
The physical attractiveness stereotype suggests that attractive people are often assumed to have desirable qualities, such as intelligence or trustworthiness. Status characteristics — observable characteristics of someone's visible appearance like age, sex, body type, or race — determine the extent to which individuals have decision-making power in groups, with perceived attractive individuals being given more influence over ultimate decisions.

=== Sexual capital ===
Sexual capital or erotic capital refers to the social and economic value accrued by an individual or group as a result of their sexual attractiveness and desirability. Sexual capital is determined by intersecting aspects of a person, including race, culture, religion, class, and gender.

== Effects ==
=== Career ===
The impact of pretty privilege on career opportunities has been widely studied within academia. Researchers have found a variety of information related to how perceived attractiveness affects career trajectory. The benefits of pretty privilege in career trajectory are often associated with an increased tendency for attractive job-seekers to get hired and to receive higher wages. Overall, there is a positive correlation between physical attractiveness and chances to receive a job offer. Watkins & Johnston found that attractive people with mediocre résumés have an increased likelihood to receive offers to interview. Furthermore, attractive individuals earn a higher salary throughout their life than less attractive individuals. Mobius & Rosenblat found that prospective employers were willing to provide a 10.5% increase in salary offers to attractive individuals when all other information is the same. Further research examined interpersonal perceptions of attractive people among co-workers, finding that attractive employees had a higher likelihood of being seen as socially competent and being recommended for a successive role. Additionally, the social capital that attractive people amass as a result of their pretty privilege can be utilized to further career connections and opportunities.

=== Social ===
Attractive individuals are provided desirable social attributes based on their appearance; they may be seen as more confident, likable, or persuasive. Attractive individuals also are perceived as more trustworthy upon first impressions. For those deemed less attractive, pretty privilege in a social context can have adverse affects on mental health and achievement levels. Gupta et al. (2015) concluded that there exists a negative relationship between physical attractiveness and depression/distress. The same study also concluded that there exists a positive correlation between physical attractiveness and psychological well-being.

=== Government ===
In the United States, pretty privilege manifests within the three branches of government. On a judicial level, analysis of cases reveal that attractiveness can affect all aspects of a criminal process. Research has revealed that defendants perceived as attractive are less likely to be arrested, less likely to be sentenced, and less likely to receive harsh sentences. Furthermore, the perceived attractiveness of the representing lawyer impacted case favorability, with more attractive lawyers having greater levels of case success. In the executive branch and legislative branches, the attractiveness of candidates can influence voters' choices.

=== Gender ===
Pretty privilege exists amongst all genders, with men, women, and those of other gender identities facing a myriad of expectations/societal norms informing why they might receive such privileges. Within contemporary society, women tend to feel the effects (or lack thereof) of pretty privilege more acutely, as women are more commonly objectified and hold lesser societal power than their male counterparts. Furthermore, research has proven that women are more readily perceived through their physical attractiveness and traits than men, with this emphasis on appearance associated with hostility towards women and sexist practices. Features granting pretty privilege are different around the world and throughout time. Some traits that are commonly considered to be desirable for women are facial symmetry, large bust size, full lips, and a low waist-hip ratio. Some common traits that are commonly considered to be desirable for men are tall height, masculine facial dimorphism, upper body strength, and broad shoulders.

== Responses ==
Responses to minimize the effects of pretty privilege exist in numerous contexts. In the workplace, there is a movement to decenter attractiveness by shifting dialogues from physicality to ability. Blind recruitment, diverse interview panels, and talent assessments are tactics employers have used to minimize the impact of attractiveness on hiring decisions. From a social perspective, body positivity content on social media has been proven to positively affect users' mental health and minimize pretty privilege biases.

A smaller body of research also suggests that pretty privilege can negatively impact attractive people, with a higher tendency for attractive individuals to be viewed as vain, despite other largely positive assessments. Additionally, Hamermesh (2011) posits that pretty privilege is a form of social productivity, in which the privileges attributed to attractive people should be viewed in the same way as other inherent characteristics like intelligence, physical strength, or musical ability.

=== Incelosphere ===
Communities within the incelosphere have applied pretty privilege on a larger ideological scale, considering physical beauty a critical factor for men. Most incels identify with the "black pill", an ideology and a subsection of the Manosphere that argues female sexual selection is primarily based on external superficial qualities such as attractiveness in looks, money, and status; they also argue that these factors, especially looks, are biologically determined. This means that any man who lacks these qualities is fatalistically subjected to a life of loneliness, never being able to experience sex or relationships.

== See also ==
- Halo effect
- Lookism
- Physical attractiveness stereotype
- Physical attractiveness
- Body positivity
- Sexual capital
