= Physical attractiveness stereotype =

Association of physical beauty with positive traits

The physical attractiveness stereotype, commonly known as the "beautiful-is-good" stereotype, is the tendency to assume that physically attractive individuals, coinciding with social beauty standards, also possess other desirable personality traits, such as intelligence, social competence, and morality. The target benefits from what has been coined as "pretty privilege", namely social, economic, and political advantages or benefits. Physical attractiveness can have a significant effect on how people are judged in terms of employment or social opportunities, friendship, sexual behavior, and marriage.

The physical attractiveness stereotype will bias an observer's opinions and decisions when comparing people of different attractiveness levels. There is evidence of this stereotype affecting decision making within social settings, but also within the workplace and the judicial system.

== History ==
The physical attractiveness stereotype was first formally observed in a study done by Karen Dion, Ellen Berscheid, and Elaine Walster in 1972. The goal of this study was to determine whether physical attractiveness affected how individuals were perceived, specifically whether they were perceived to have more socially desirable personality traits and quality of life. Participants, all university students, were informed that they would be tested on how well they could "read" a person after seeing a single photo of them, where their performance would then be compared to individuals trained in reading body language and other interpersonal skills. The subjects were then given three envelopes that contained a photo of either a male or female near the subjects' age, who the researchers had categorized as either attractive, average, or unattractive. Findings demonstrated that, overall, attractive individuals judged to be more socially desirable, have better job and marital prospects, be better spouses, and have better social, marital and professional lives compared to unattractive individuals. The only dimension that did not realise the same results was parenting, where attractive individuals were not rated higher on the expectation of being a better parent. Hence, this study coined the term "beautiful-is-good".

== Related theories and perspectives ==
There are some proposed theoretical underpinnings and evidence for the physical attractiveness stereotype.

=== Implicit personality theory ===
The implicit personality theory is the unconscious assumptions one makes about another's personality based on their characteristics. These assumptions can be based on other personality traits but in the context of the physical attractiveness stereotype, they are based on physical traits. Using this theory, researchers explain the physical attractiveness stereotype in that attractive physical features are linked with positive assumptions of personality and unattractive physical features are linked with negative assumptions of personality. These unconscious linkages can explain why those seen as more physically attractive are treated and perceived differently. However, this theory becomes inaccurate when individuals make assumptions based on pre-conceived judgements they believe make sense without applying them to real-world circumstances.

One prevalent study conducted a meta-analysis which used the implicit personality theory to challenge the “beauty-is-good” theory. The study found that the traits associated with attractiveness were only remarkably strong for social competence (e.g., sociability, popularity), whereas people also tended to view them as more vain and less modest. With evidence finding that the “beauty-is-good” theory was not one-dimensional, using the implicit personality framework was argued to be most appropriate, encouraging the context-dependent nature and complexity of the physically attractive stereotype to be acknowledged.

=== Evolution ===
The principle of evolutionary biology is that, in case of genetic variation within a population in a characteristic, the form which improves the individual's chance of survival and reproduction will be selected over other forms and becomes more frequent within the population. Evolutionary psychologists suggest that the physical attractiveness stereotype has evolved for individuals to assess potential mates and reproductive partners and as a means to assess our status ranking among same-sex members.

The reproductive strategy of women and men differ; however, both include advertising to potential mates and competing with same-sex members to demonstrate one's value. Attractiveness or beauty is the display of these traits and one of the most important predictors of reproductive success. Physical attractiveness may have evolved as a signal of good health, fitness, and genetic quality. Certain physical features, including symmetry, clear skin, and waist-to-hip ratio, signal reproductive health. Individuals with these features are perceived as more attractive because they possess genes which they could pass on to the next generation.

The physical attractiveness stereotype may have also evolved as a result of natural selection. Attractive individuals may have a greater chance of mating and passing on desirable traits and are therefore preferred as mates over others based on their physical attractiveness.

Physical attractiveness, therefore, provides the target with direct benefits where they gain directly for themselves and their offspring, and indirect benefits whereby the target gains genetic benefits to the offspring.

=== Brain regions involved in perceiving attractiveness ===
Here only the brain regions used in assessing facial beauty will be discussed, since there is little research of how the brain processes body judgements.

The brain uses at least three cognitive domains to decide the value of attractiveness. At first, the occipital and temporal regions of the cortex process face views. The information about facial features is then passed on to the fusiform face area of the fusiform gyrus (FG) for facial recognition. When judging an unfamiliar face, the FG responds more strongly to attractive faces than unattractive ones, suggesting that the recognition of attractive features occurs even before the rest of the brain is included in the evaluation.

The second module interprets facial movements and then interacts with other brain regions such as the amygdala, insula, and limbic system for the emotional content of facial expressions and movements.

Information is then passed on to the third module, the orbitofrontal cortex (OFC) which makes judgments of beauty and produces the neurological rewards, namely dopamine and other neurotransmitters, for finding the face's beauty. The OFC is more active when viewing an attractive face versus an unattractive face. These areas of the brain are also associated with reward processing and regulating experiences of pleasure motivation. Researchers suggest that our brains find attractive faces rewarding which could be part of the reason more attractive people benefit from pretty privilege.

=== Memory ===
In memory systems, stereotypes form as information is encoded and stored, primarily as semantic memory, integrating into existing schemas. They are then primed and retrieved into working memory when forming judgements.

Studies have suggested stereotypes foster efficiency in encoding, where information congruent with stereotypes can readily assimilate and consolidate into existing schemas. Information, hence, was also better recalled, though potentially motivated by confirmation biases. Studies found people often mistakenly recognised stereotype-congruent information as familiar, bolstered by findings of recognition biases stemmed from stereotypes generating false memories. Furthermore, when memory processes were compromised, stereotypes were exercised as heuristic cues in facilitating the retrieval of information and formation of judgements. For example, studies found upon recounting episodic memories, people relied on semantic memory in reinterpreting forgotten details, as it is more easily retrievable. Similar behaviours were also observed when complexity or cognitive demand of tasks increased. For instance, one study found that as decision-making became harder, jurors exhibited stronger stereotype-congruent recall of case details and judgements on defendants. Hence, though stereotypes can sometimes allow people to remember, recall and recognise more easily, it comes at the expense of accurately recalling and utilising these concepts later on.

Findings from Jean-Christophe Rohner and Anders Rasmussens' support such findings, whilst tailoring their study’s focus specifically to the physically attractive stereotype.

Their 2011 study found evidence that both explicit (conscious) and implicit (unconscious) memory systems recognised stereotype-congruent better than incongruent information. Across three experiments, researchers presented participants with equally divided sets of congruent and incongruent face-word pairs (e.g., an attractive face with “kind” or “cruel”, respectively). Researchers then conducted subsequent memory tests, presenting new face-word pairs along with the old pairs. Explicit memory was investigated by observing whether participants could accurately recognise and categorise the pairs as "old" or "new". Implicit memory was measured similarly, albeit participants only focused on the word's valence (e.g., "kind" is "positive") to judge whether the presented “face” influenced response/reaction time. The study also measured the participants' subjective confidence in their responses

Though results demonstrated participants had recognised congruent pairs most accurately and quickly, they also frequently categorised them as "old" regardless. No significant correlation between answers and measures of low confidence was found, demonstrating participants confidently believed they encountered congruent pairs before, supporting previous notions of bias imposed on recognition memory.

Moreover, their 2012 study extended this by investigating the effects of nine moderating variables on stereotype-guided behaviours. Results demonstrated no moderator had a statistically significant impact in reducing bias, indicating the need for potentially accommodating real-world scenarios to account for the strength of the physically attractive stereotype.

== Real-life implications ==
In the years since the publication of the original study, further research has bolstered the physical attractiveness stereotype and expanded its influence into other areas.

=== Intelligence ratings ===
Physical attraction also has a strong relationship with how intelligent one is perceived. For both adults and children, attractive individuals are expected to be more intellectually competent than unattractive individuals. This effect is stronger in adults and also stronger in males. Between equally attractive males and females, the males will be perceived as more intelligent. This perception exists despite little to no evidence that attractiveness is correlated with actual competence.

=== Workplace ===
Research has shown that this stereotype exists in the workplace as well. A meta-analysis looking at how one's level of physical attractiveness can affect various job-related outcomes showed a strong relationship between attractive individuals and better job outcomes. The report accumulated over 60 study results and showed that attractive individuals were perceived as better employees. They are more likely to be hired and promoted, as well as ranked higher in performance evaluations and employment potential than unattractive counterparts. This stereotype is present for and affects both men and women as neither the gender of the attractive individual nor the gender of the observer influences the relationship.

=== Judicial system ===
Studies have demonstrated how attractive defendants also receive more lenient treatment in judicial settings, being viewed as less dangerous and more virtuous.

A meta-analysis conducted by Ronald Mazella and Alan Feingold investigated the effect of a defendant’s physical attractiveness on jury rulings through mock trials to better understand juries’ decision-making. It was found that defendants who were physically attractive, female, and of high socioeconomic status received weaker sentences. Juries were more likely to find a physically unattractive defendant guilty than an attractive defendant. Additionally, for certain crimes, juries recommended lesser punishments for attractive individuals. In the case of robbery, rape, and cheating, the attractiveness of the defendant contributed to a lesser sentence. However, in the case of negligent homicide, attractive individuals received harsher punishments than their unattractive counterparts, though the effect size of these findings were notably small. Researchers posit that this occurs because attractive individuals are held to higher standards than unattractive individuals. Therefore, they are treated harsher when they make a mistake, such as in the case of negligent homicide.

Most studies also found that attractiveness led to weaker punishments. However, for crimes that shared relations with attractiveness, such as swindling, they received harsher sentences compared to their unattractive counterparts. This is potentially a result of jurors perceiving defendants to weaponise their attractiveness, hindering stereotype-congruent associations to be exercised in decision-making. Generally, such results were rationalised by acknowledging that benefits reaped from the physically attractive stereotype were not unidirectional. Some studies posited that when attractive defendants provided justification, jurors anchored to this more positively, and were more forgiving in sentencing. However, when justification was low, jurors could not characterise defendants with stereotype-congruent traits of attractiveness, realising no benefits over unattractive defendants.

The effects physically-attractive stereotypes have on memory also underscore the fragility of certain judicial processes. Empirical evidence revealed that people rely on stereotypes in inferring forgotten details when recalling personal memories, or as a heuristic to ease complex decision-making. Such findings further shed light on potentially detrimental biases impinging jurors, with similar implications applying to memory-based judgements like eyewitness testimonies.

Many studies have found unattractive faces are stereotypically associated with untrustworthiness, and hence, criminality and guilt in crime-settings. One study found that unattractive/“criminal” faces were more memorable and easier recognised. Another study indirectly supported this, however, their results indicated that, more significantly, participants failed to recognise individuals intra-categorically (e.g., attractive individuals from each other). Such recognition error was also demonstrated with other variables such as race, with some highlighting that people were notably confident in their judgements. The implications of this on eyewitness testimonies can be inferred, where unattractive individuals are particularly vulnerable to these stereotype-motivated recognition errors, especially when sharing similar characteristics to the actual perpetrator or those associated with criminality.

Current literature has also found that asking witnesses to select out of options can make them feel more confident in their answers, where this is misconstrued as accurate. For example, providing a series of mugshots for them to select the perpetrator. It is encouraged for them to freely recall information instead. Studies have also found that stereotype-motivated behaviour is potentially easily reversible, where simply informing participants to be more deliberate and conscious in mitigating stereotypical thinking can almost entirely remove its biassed effects.

A 2023 study found that attractive victims of intimate partner violence are viewed as being more credible compared to less attractive victims.

=== Education ===
In a review of studies done that examine perception of students in the education system, it was found that attractive students were treated more favorably by their teachers than unattractive students. Consistent with the perception that attractive individuals are more intelligent, research shows that teachers have higher expectations for attractive students. They expect these students to be more intelligent, earn better grades, and have better social attributes than other, less attractive students. Furthermore, various studies done between 1960–1985 show that attractive students actually earned higher scores on standardized tests. Researchers believe this is an example of a self-fulfilling prophecy, where the teacher's higher expectations for the attractive students cause them to work harder and perform better.

== Criticism ==
There are recent studies that indicate that the physical attractiveness stereotype can also be a negative bias and disadvantage the target. Research suggests that there might exist an exception to pretty privilege when the viewer and the target are of the same sex. In the study, targets were less likely to be recommended for a job and admission into university compared to average-looking individuals. This might stem from a desire to avoid perceived self-threats posed by attractive same-sex targets. Especially individuals who lack self-esteem are more likely to avoid these threats than those with high self-esteem.

== See also ==
- List of cognitive biases
- Lookism
- Body privilege
- Halo effect
- Physical attractiveness
