= Ugliness =

Aesthetically unfavorable characteristic

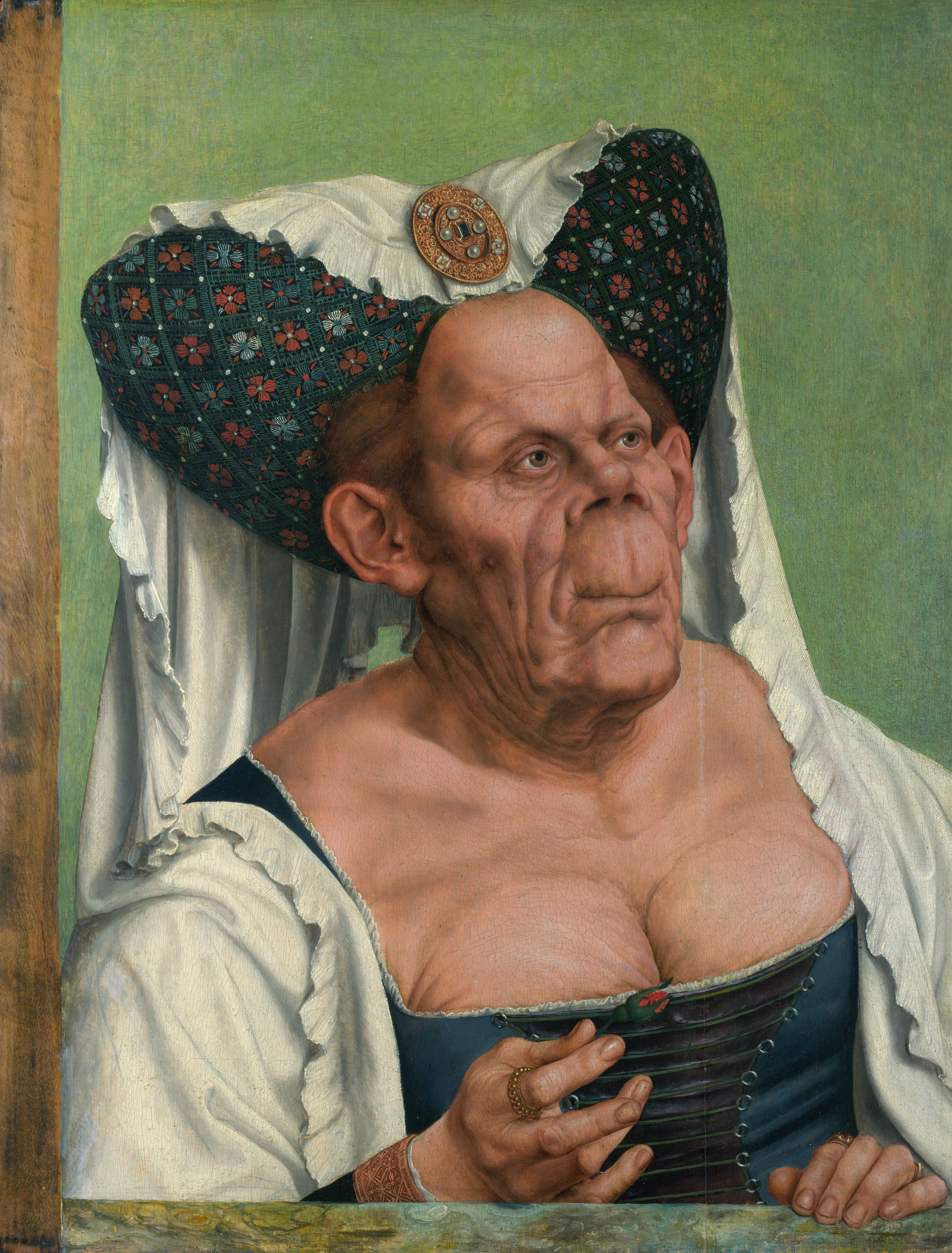
The Ugly Duchess (painting by Quentin Matsys, c. 1513)

Unattractiveness or ugliness is the degree to which a person's physical features are considered aesthetically unfavorable.

== Terminology ==
Ugliness is a property of a person or thing that is unpleasant to look upon and results in a highly unfavorable evaluation. The point of ugliness is to be aesthetically unattractive, unpleasing, repulsive, or offensive. There are many terms associated with visually unappealing or aesthetically undesirable people, including hideousness and unsightliness.

== History ==
Jean-Paul Sartre had strabismus and a bloated, asymmetrical face, and he attributed many of his philosophical ideas to his lifelong struggle to come to terms with his self-described ugliness. Socrates also used his ugliness as a philosophical touch point, concluding that philosophy can save a person from their outward ugliness. Famous in his own time for his perceived ugliness, Abraham Lincoln was described by a contemporary: "to say that he is ugly is nothing; to add that his figure is grotesque, is to convey no adequate impression." However, his looks proved to be an asset in his personal and political relationships, as his law partner William Herndon wrote, "He was not a pretty man by any means, nor was he an ugly one; he was a homely man, careless of his looks, plain-looking and plain-acting. He had no pomp, display, or dignity, so-called. He appeared simple in his carriage and bearing. He was a sad-looking man; his melancholy dripped from him as he walked. His apparent gloom impressed his friends, and created sympathy for him—one means of his great success."

== Prejudice ==
Discrimination or prejudice against unattractive people is sometimes referred to as lookism, cacophobia, or aschemophobia, and if it is a result of one's disfigurement, ableism. Teratophobia is an aversion or fear of people who appear monstrous, have blemishes or are disfigured. When such an aversion is coupled with prejudice or discrimination, it may be viewed as a form of bullying. With the dating world or courtship, judging others purely based on their outward appearance is acknowledged as an attitude that does transpire, yet is often viewed as an approach that is superficial and shallow. Some research indicates a sentencing disparity where unattractive people are "more likely to be recommended psychiatric care" than attractive people. Prejudice against ugliness is complex: Gretchen Henderson suggests that there is, paradoxically, a cultural suspicion towards both beauty and ugliness.

=== Legality ===
Some jurisdictions already make it illegal to discriminate based on immutable forms of aesthetic appearance, including the Australian state of Victoria, wherein lookism was officially recognized as an illegal form of discrimination in 1995. In the United States, several states and major cities' jurisdictions have legislation prohibiting appearance-related discrimination.

== See also ==
- Ugly laws
