= Nancy Etcoff =

American psychologist (b. 1955)

- Born: 1955 (age 70–71)
- Citizenship: American
- Education: Brown University; Harvard University; Boston University; MIT
- Known for: Survival of the Prettiest (1999)
- Scientific career
- Fields: Psychology
- Workplaces: Harvard University; Massachusetts General Hospital

Nancy Etcoff (born 1955) is an American psychologist at Harvard University, where she has taught classes about the mind, brain, behavior, and aesthetics. Etcoff is best known for her 1999 book Survival of the Prettiest: the Science of Beauty, which argues for a biological basis for human beauty linked to evolutionary psychology. In addition, she works at Massachusetts General Hospital.

== Education ==
Etcoff earned her B.A from Brown University. She initially studied comparative literature before switching her major to psychology. She received an M.Ed. from Harvard University and earned her Ph.D. in psychology at Boston University. After this, she completed her postdoctoral fellowship in brain and cognitive sciences at the Massachusetts Institute of Technology (MIT).

== Work and research ==
Etcoff is an associate professor of Harvard Medical School and works as a psychologist at the Massachusetts General Hospital. Etcoff serves as the director of the Psychiatric Neuroimaging Laboratories Program in Aesthetics and Well-Being, and is on the advisory board of the Peabody Essex Museum.

=== Psychology of beauty and happiness ===
Etcoff leads seminars in neuroaesthetics. In her 1999 book Survival of the Prettiest: the Science of Beauty, she rejects the notion of beauty as a cultural construct, an invention of the fashion industry, or a backlash against feminism. Instead Etcoff argues that human beauty perception is a biological artifact derived from evolutionary genetic pressure. This book was the basis of a one-hour Discovery Channel episode.

Etcoff's work on the subject of beauty has been discussed in many major news outlets, including The New York Times, The Wall Street Journal, Newsweek, Cosmopolitan, The Atlantic, Forbes, Fortune, among others.

Etcoff has given public presentations in forums, such as the New York Academy of Sciences and the TED Conference. She has been interviewed by the National Public Radio.

Etcoff's definitions of human happiness have appeared on the Harvard Medical Magazine.

=== Scientific publications ===
In 2017, Etcoff was co-author of Zen and the Art of Living Mindfully: The Health-Enhancing Potential of Zen Aesthetics. She has 15 earlier publications, primarily on facial expressions and facial attractiveness, listed at Medline.

== Personal life ==
Etcoff was born in 1955. She was married to the cognitive psychologist Steven Pinker from 1980 to 1992.
