= Attributional ambiguity =

Psychological attribution concept

Attributional ambiguity is a psychological attribution concept describing the difficulty that members of stigmatized or negatively stereotyped groups may have in interpreting feedback. According to this concept, a person who perceives themselves as stigmatized can attribute negative feedback to prejudice. This can lead stigmatized group members to feel uncertainty about whether negative outcomes are due to discrimination against them or their own behavior. In comparison, they might discredit positive feedback as a form of sympathy rather than seeing it as the result of their ability and achievement. The term was coined by Melvin Snyder, Robert E. Kleck, Angelo Strenta, and Steven J. Mentzer in 1979 before being popularized by Jennifer Crocker, Brenda Major and their colleagues in the 1990s.

== Implications ==
Attributional ambiguity can have unfortunate repercussions for members of stigmatized groups. Members of groups that are ‘stereotype-vulnerable’ or are often stereotyped are at greater risk of having less self-worth through the lens of attributional ambiguity. With this concept, when people of an often stigmatized group receive feedback, they are unsure what the basis is for that feedback and believe it could have been attributed to things other than performance alone. Whether it is positive or negative feedback they face uncertainty about how accurate that feedback was and thus feeling uncertain about how to interpret the responses.

In the absence of true feedback one cannot totally rely on that evaluation and thus cannot adjust their behavior or performance accordingly. Attributional ambiguity can be applied in a very broad sense, considering how often people seek feedback. In academics, athletics, relationships, etc. are all areas in which feedback can be pivotal. For example, if it is known that a manager is very sensitive to his/her subordinates’ feelings, and he/she gives positive feedback, it is unclear if that feedback was true or simply an action of sensitivity.

== Empirical support ==
In an experiment conducted by Jennifer Crocker, Brenda Major and colleagues, women who were evaluated unfavorably by a blatantly prejudiced evaluator experienced less negative affect than women who were rated unfavorably by an unbiased evaluator. With African American participants, it was found that when reviewed negatively African Americans were more likely to attribute the evaluator's negativity to prejudice than were white participants. Furthermore, African Americans were likely to attribute both negative and positive reviews to prejudice if they could be seen by the evaluator. Being visible (and thus vulnerable to being stereotyped based on race) helped African Americans cope with negative reviews, but also made them more likely to discredit positive reviews.

The same concept can be applied not only to race, ethnicity, gender, etc., but appearance as well. The extent to which one views his/herself as attractive can affect how they perceive feedback. A study by Major, Carrington & Carnevale (1984) found that, as described above, the attractive participants were less likely to believe positive feedback given to them, believing that the observer had an ulterior motive. When the observer could see the attractive participant, they doubted the true motive behind their positive feedback. Unattractive participants were more likely to believe positive feedback than were attractive participants. When an ulterior motive is possible, it is easier to discount the feedback whether it is positive or negative. (See also Lookism.)

C. L. Hoyt and colleagues examined attributional ambiguity in Latino subjects as compared to white subjects. They found that when given a negative review Latino subjects were more likely to attribute this negativity to the prejudice of the examiner than white subjects. They also found that when given a positive review, Latino subjects were more likely to discredit the positivity of the reviewer and experience a lower sense of well being than their white counterparts. This research suggests that while attributional ambiguity can be used as a buffer to protect the self from negative reviews and biased thoughts, it can also prevent stigmatized groups from embracing reviews.

== See also ==
- Attribution (psychology)
- Fundamental attribution error
- Lookism
- Minority group
- Social psychology
- Social stigma
- Ultimate attribution error
