= Ugly law =

Unsightly beggar ordinances in the United States

From 1867 to 1974, various cities of the United States had unsightly beggar ordinances, retroactively named ugly laws. These laws targeted poor people and disabled people. For instance, in San Francisco, a law from 1867 deemed it illegal for "any person, who is diseased, maimed, mutilated or deformed in any way, so as to be an unsightly or disgusting object, to expose himself or herself to public view." Exceptions to public exposure were acceptable only if the people were subjects of demonstration, to illustrate the separation of disabled from nondisabled and their need for reformation.

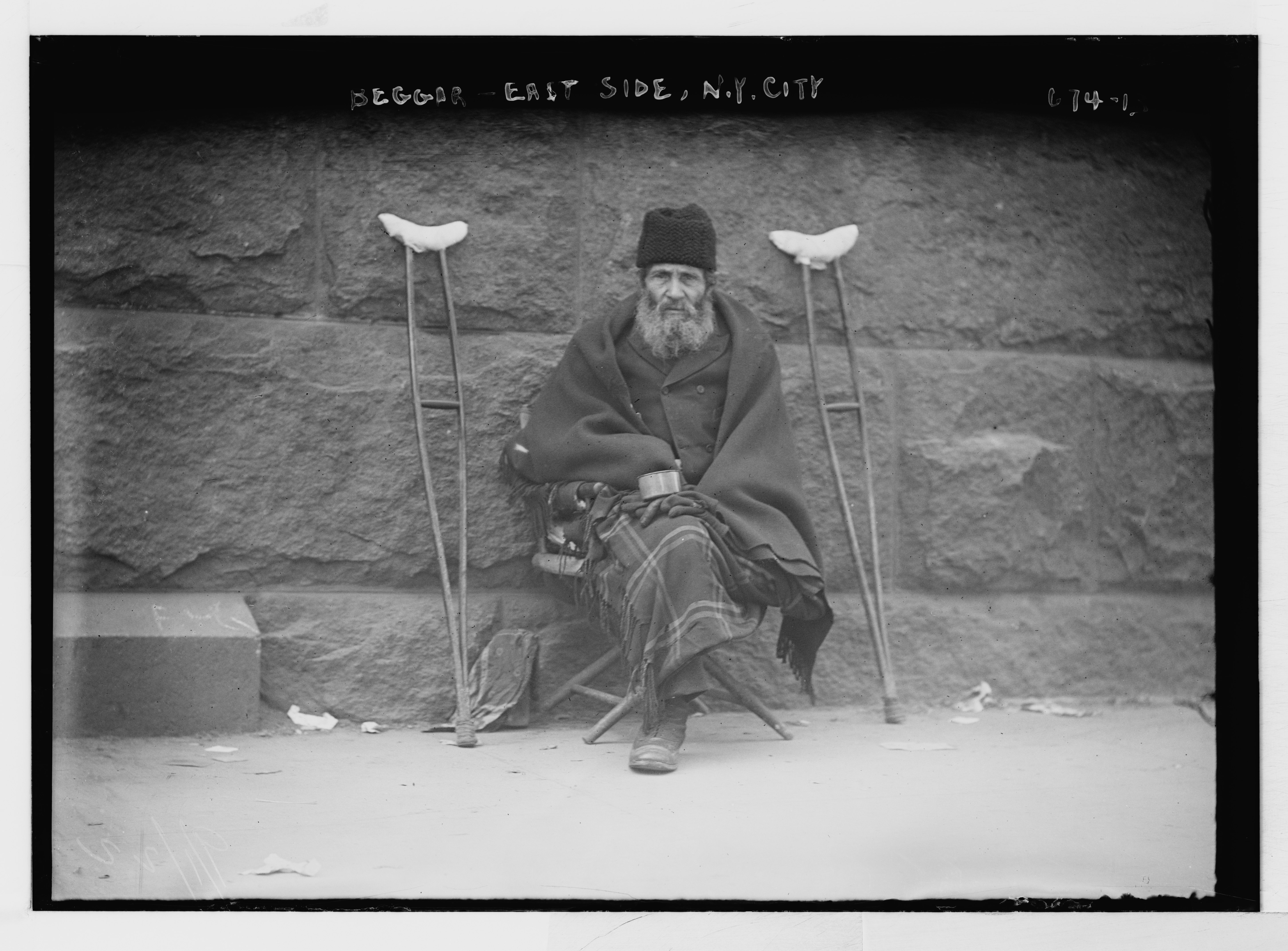
A beggar in 1920s New York with his crutches

The Charity Organization Society suggested that the best charity relief would be to investigate and counsel the people needing assistance instead of providing them with material relief. This created conflict in people between their desire to be good Christians and good citizens when seeing people in need of assistance. It was suggested that the beggars imposed guilt upon people in this way. The educator William F. Slocum wrote in 1886 that "Pauperism is a disease upon the community, a sore upon the body politic, and being a disease, it must be, as far as possible, removed, and the curative purpose must be behind all our thought and effort for the pauper class." Similarly, other authors suggested that one who gave charity to beggars without knowing what was to be done with the funds was as "culpable as one who fires a gun into a crowd".

The term ugly laws was coined in the mid-1970s by detractors Marcia Pearce Burgdorf and Robert Burgdorf, Jr.

== History ==
Ugly laws in the United States arose in the late nineteenth century. During this period, urban spaces underwent an influx of new residents, which placed strain on the existing communities. The new residents were sometimes impoverished. This meant large numbers of people who were strangers to each other now occupied closer quarters than they had in small towns, where such local institutions as schools, families, and churches helped moderate social relations. As a reaction to this influx of people who were impoverished, ministers, charitable organizers, city planners, and city officials across the United States worked to create ugly laws for their community.

The language of the unsightly beggar ordinances pertained to hiding the parts of the person that may appear disabled or diseased. This includes any movements that would indicate a disability or disease, like limping.

The first American ordinance pertaining to preventing people with disabilities from appearing in public was passed in 1867 in San Francisco, California. This ordinance had to do with the broader topic of begging. It is noted that people who were perhaps in need of money traveled to California to "strike it rich" during the California Gold Rush. When they did not find themselves wealthy, they remained in California. Letters and documents from the period just after the California Gold Rush note the large number of "insane" people wandering the streets. Helper (1948) even refers to the "insane" people as "pitible nuisance" and remarked that they were allowed in public with no one to care for them.

New Orleans, Louisiana, had a similar law police were strictly enforcing in 1883. A New Orleans newspaper reported on the City adopting a tough stance on begging as other cities in the United States had.

Portland, Oregon enacted an ugly law in 1881.

The Chicago ordinance of 1881 read as follows:

Any person who is diseased, maimed, mutilated, or in any way deformed, so as to be an unsightly or disgusting object, or an improper person to be allowed in or on the streets, highways, thoroughfares, or public places in the city, shall not therein or thereon expose himself or herself to public view, under the penalty of a fine of $1 for each offense (Chicago City Code 1881)

The $1 is equivalent to $33 in 2025. In most cities, punishments for violating an ugly law ranged from incarceration to fines of up to $50 for each offense.

In May 1881, the unsightly beggar ordinance went into effect in Chicago, Illinois. It was created by Chicago alderman James Peevey. Peevey is quoted in the Chicago Tribune from May 19, 1881, saying of the ordinance, "Its object is to abolish all street obstructions." Ugly laws identified groups of people as disturbing the flow of public life and forbid them from public spaces. Such people, deemed "unsightly" or "unseemly", were usually impoverished and often beggars. Thus ugly laws were methods by which lawmakers attempted to remove the poor from sight.

Laws similar to Chicago's followed in Denver, Colorado, and Lincoln, Nebraska, in 1889. At some time from 1881 to 1890 an ugly law was enacted in Omaha, Nebraska. Additionally, ugly laws were sparked by the Panic of 1893. These included Columbus, Ohio, in 1894, and in 1891 for the entire state of Pennsylvania. Pennsylvania's was different as it contained language applying to cognitive disability as well as physical disability. An attempt was made at introducing ugly laws in New York, but it failed in 1895. Initial drafts in New York were similar to those in Pennsylvania as to include cognitive disabilities. Reno, Nevada instituted an ordinance before 1905. Los Angeles, California, attempted to pass an ordinance in 1913.

In 1902, an ugly law similar to that of the United States was enacted in the City of Manila in the Philippines. This law was similar to those of the United States, being written in English and during a time when Manila was under American control, and included the common phrasing "no person who is diseased". This was one of the first ordinances to be written under American control. Other ordinances dealt with hygiene reform and considered unsightly beggars part of this initiative.

The last ugly laws were repealed in 1974. Omaha, Nebraska, repealed its ugly law in 1967, yet had an arrest of a person for violating the unsightly beggar ordinance documented in 1974. Columbus, Ohio, repealed its law in 1972. Chicago was the last to repeal its ugly law in 1974.

== Enforcement ==
People charged under the ugly laws were either charged a fine or held in jail until they could be sent to the poor house or work farm. The wording in the San Francisco ordinance indicates violators will be sent to the almshouse. This connects with the Victorian Era poor law policy.

Historian Brad Byrom noted ugly laws have been unevenly and rarely enforced, being disregarded by police. The first recorded arrest pertaining to ugly laws was Martin Oates in San Francisco, California, in July 1867. Oates was a former Union soldier during the American Civil War.

The ugly laws did not restrict performances of people with disabilities for the purpose of entertainment or eliciting disgust, but rather restricted people with disabilities from mingling with the general public.

Use of the ugly laws to control the use of public spaces by people with disabilities was still occurring after the signing of the Rehabilitation Act of 1973.

Racism also played a role in the establishment and enforcement of ugly laws. In 1860s San Francisco, Chinese immigrants and their descendants were unlawfully quarantined en masse to prevent spread of disease and epidemics.

The last recorded arrest related to an ugly law was in 1974, under an Omaha, Nebraska ordinance. In this instance, the man arrested was homeless and the officer arresting him did so under the guise of the ugly law as the man had visible scars and marks on his body. The judge, Walter Cropper, and assistant prosecutor, Richard Epstein, in this case noted there was no legal definition for ugly and criminal prosecution would demand proving someone is ugly. The result was that the city prosecutor, Gary Bucchino, did not file charges. He noted that while the law was still active, this person did not meet the definition.

== Criticism ==
Ugly laws prevented some people with physical disabilities from going out in public at all.

British scholar Stuart Murray argues that the "civil contagion" of proliferation of ugly laws is peculiarly American: "Disability disturbs, and it disturbs the sense of self in U.S. contexts in special ways."

Jacobus tenBroek (1966) argued that the limitations imposed on a person with a disability had little to do with actual disability, but rather "society's imagined thoughts of disability difficulties and risks".

In 1975, Marcia Pearce Burgdorf and Robert Burgdorf, Jr. wrote about the unsightly beggar ordinances in their newspaper article, "A History of Unequal Treatment: The Qualifications of Handicapped Persons as a 'Suspect Class' under the Equal Protection Clause". In this article, the term "ugly laws" was created and used, having been inspired by the newspaper article title regarding the Omaha arrest in 1974. It was an act of advocacy.

John Belluso's play The Body of Bourne has a scene in which Randolph Bourne was confronted in Chicago due to an ugly law. While this is a fictional occurrence, the depiction of the law indicates the impact on disability history.

In 1980, while on tour in Europe, a performer with the San Francisco-based Lilith Women's Theatre, Victoria Ann Lewis, delivered a monologue about the difficulty of people with disabilities finding work due to the social idea that people with disabilities should hide or be in the circus. Lewis believed herself to be denied admission to a theater school in New York City due to her limp. She noted they tried to persuade her to take a position behind the scenes. She felt this was due to the ugly laws and that she would not be able to perform in some cities.

== Impact on legislation and policy ==
There was a connection between ugly laws and "public hygiene management schemes" such as segregation, eugenics, and institutionalization.

The ugly laws had an impact on what society considers rehabilitation. "In the rehabilitationist program the aim is in one sense to make disability vanish", to "cause the disabled to disappear and with them all that is lacking, in order to assimilate them, drown them, dissolve them in the greater and single social whole". People with disabilities were not allowed to publicly beg for food or money to support their needs as a person, but it was acceptable to display themselves commercially to beg for a cure or salvation from their disability.

Relationships, reproductive rights and individual right to life were also impacted by the ugly laws and charitable philosophy during this period. Policy makers discussed preventing people with disabilities from marrying and having children. The policy makers suggested this was to prevent the children their union would produce from tainting society's heredity pool. Charity must "do what it can to check the spreading curse of race degeneration". People involved with charitable policy suggested that while euthanasia would be a release for the person struggling with their disabilities, it also went against the moral principles taught by religion.

The repeals of ugly laws followed soon after the passage of the Rehabilitation Act of 1973 and its Section 504, and the 1990 passage of the Americans with Disabilities Act further stopped any possibility of a recreation of ugly laws.

Fredman (2011) comments:

Individuals with disabilities are a discrete and insular minority who have been faced with restrictions and limitations, subjected to a history of purposeful unequal treatment, and relegated to a position of political powerlessness in our society, based on characteristics that are beyond the control of such individuals and resulting from stereotypic assumptions not truly indicative of the individual ability of such individuals to participate in, and contribute to, society.

== See also ==
- Ableism
- Freak show
- Lookism
- Social cleansing
