= Deborah Jones Merritt =

American legal scholar

Deborah Jones Merritt is an American legal scholar.

Merritt earned a bachelor of arts degree in history at Harvard College in 1977, and subsequently graduated from Columbia Law School in 1980. She is the John Deaver Drinko–Baker & Hostetler Chair in Law at the Ohio State University Moritz College of Law. The Deborah Jones Merritt Center for the Advancement of Justice is named for her.
