= Sexual harassment in education in the United States =

Sexual harassment in education in the United States is an unwelcome behavior of a sexual nature that interferes with an American student's ability to learn, study, work or participate in school activities. It is common in middle and high schools in the United States. Sexual or gender harassment is a form of discrimination under Title IX of the Education Amendments of 1972. Sexual harassment involves a range of behavior from mild annoyances to unwanted touching and, in extreme cases, rape or other sexual assault.

The definition of sexual harassment includes harassment by both peers and individuals in a position of power relative to the person being harassed. In schools, though sexual harassment initiated by students is most common, it can also be perpetrated by teachers or other school employees, and the victim can be a student, a teacher, or other school employee. Some have argued that even consensual sexual interactions between students and teachers constitute harassment because the inherent power differential creates a dynamic in which "mutual consent" is impossible.

== Statistics ==
In their 2000 survey on 2064 students in 8th through 11th grade, the American Association of University Women (AAUW) reported:

- 81% or eight out of 10 students experience sexual harassment in school
- 83% of girls have been sexually harassed
- 78% of boys have been sexually harassed
- 38% of the students were harassed by teachers or school employees
- 36% of school employees or teachers were harassed by students
- 42% of school employees or teachers had been harassed by each other

In their recent study (AAUW 2006) on sexual harassment at colleges and universities, the AAUW claimed that while both men and women were targets of sexual harassment, "women are disproportionately negatively affected."

- 62% of female college students and 61% of male college students report having been sexually harassed at their university.
- 66% of college students know someone personally who was harassed.
- 10% or fewer of student sexual harassment victims attempt to report their experiences to a university employee.
- 35% or more of college students who experience sexual harassment do not tell anyone about their experiences.
- 80% of students who experienced sexual harassment report being harassed by another student or former student.
- 39% of students who experienced sexual harassment say the incident or incidents occurred in the dorm.
- 51% of male college students admit to sexually harassing someone in college, with 22% admitting to harassing someone often or occasionally.
- 31% of female college students admit to harassing someone in college.
- Over 70% of LGBT college students have experienced sexual harassment.

In the "Report Card on Gender Equity," the NCWGE that 30 percent of undergraduate students, and 40 percent of graduate students, have been sexually harassed. (NCWGE, 1997)

The Associated Press reported 2,500 cases of teacher sexual misconduct between 2002 and 2007. From 2001 to 2005, 2,570 teacher credentials were revoked for sexual misconduct. There were about 3 million teachers at the time.

=== Demographics ===
==== Gender ====
According to surveys conducted by the AAUW in 1993 and 2001:

- While in both surveys, female students reported experiencing sexual harassment more than the male students, the percentage of male students reporting sexual harassment increased from 49% in 1993 to 56% in 2001.
- In 2001, female students who had been sexually harassed in school reported male-to-female harassment that was one-on-one while male students who experienced sexual harassment reported either one-to-one harassment by a female, or harassment by a group of females.

==== Race ====
In the same surveys (AAUW 1993, 2001) it was found that:

- 21% of white male students reported having had someone tug at or pull down their clothing in an inappropriate way, while only 10% of African American male students reported this.
- While 51% of Hispanic and 51% of white female students experienced being touched in an inappropriate, sexual manner, 67% of African American females experienced this.
- 18% of Hispanic, 15% of white, and 28% of African American female students reported having been forced to kiss someone.
- 30% of Hispanic, 32% of white, and 50% of African American female students have had someone tug or pull down their clothing in an inappropriate way.

== Types ==
There are three primary types of sexual harassment found in schools: verbal, visual/non-verbal, and physical. The most common type is verbal, followed by physical, and visual/non-verbal. In the survey conducted by the AAUW in 2000, it was found that 6 out of 10, or 58% of the students reported experiencing some form of physical harassment at some point during their time in school, and 76% reported experiencing nonphysical (verbal or visual/nonverbal) at some point during their time in school.

=== Verbal ===
Verbal sexual harassment includes unwanted sexual humor, sexual rumors, inappropriate sexual name calling, and homophobic slurs, judging or rating others' body parts, pressure for sexual relationships, and sexual harassment via phone calls.

=== Visual/non-verbal ===
Visual/non-verbal sexual harassment includes unwanted written sexual communication (notes, text messages, letters, email), unwanted sexual facial expressions or gestures, indecent exposure, and the showing of sexual pictures.

Advancements in technology have expanded visual/non-verbal sexual harassment to also include taking unsolicited photographs and videos of students.

=== Physical ===
Physical sexual harassment includes sexually brushing against someone, having one's clothing pulled or tugged in a sexual manner, unwanted sexual touching, and any forced kissing or touching.

== Peer-to-peer ==
Most sexually harassing behavior is student-on-student. In "The Report Card on Gender Equity", by the National Coalition for Women and Girls in Education (NCWGE), it was reported that, of students who have been sexually harassed, 90% were harassed by other students. (NCWGE, 1997) And in their 2006 report on sexual harassment in higher education, the AAUW reported that 80% of students sexually harassed were targeted by other students. (AAUW, 2006)

One of the most common reasons reported for sexually harassing behavior is because the harasser thinks it is funny to do so. In their 2006 study, the AAUW found that this was the most common rationale for harassment by boys—59 percent used it. Less than one-fifth (17%) of those boys who admitted to harassing others say they did so because they wanted a date with the person. (AAUW, 2006) Other researchers assert that the "I thought it was funny" rationale is a fallacy, and the true reasons align more with that of a need to assert power and induce fear in others—more in line with bullying. These hazing behaviors develop in school, continue in high school and college, eventually moving into the workplace. (Boland, 2002)

In late 2006/early 2007 a study revealed that more than 20% of all boys had been harassed by a female student. In 15% of all cases the girl admitted to sexually harassing the boy and asserted the reasons of "I thought it was funny" and "I'm not doing any harm, it's what he wanted". High schools are addressing this behavior.

Peer-to-peer sexual harassment is three times more likely than perpetration by teachers or other school faculty. Sexual harassment between peers may also be a result of students trying to conform to expected gender norms created by society. It can also be used as a tool for gender policing. For example, this could be seen if a male is exhibiting behavior not seen to peers as being masculine, so others may label him with homophobic slurs in order to reinforce gender conformity through a form of nonphysical sexual harassment. Students may exhibit, accept, or tolerate this conforming behavior as to not cause rifts in peer groups.

Developmental causes may also result in sexual harassment among students. Those who are unprepared to interact with those of the opposite sex, are unable to appropriately read social cues, or try to exhibit sexual interest in another while not understanding appropriate boundaries, may end up engaging in sexually harassing behavior.

== By teachers ==
=== Prevalence ===
A literature review of educator sexual misconduct published by the US Department of Education in 2004 written by researcher Charol Shakeshaft found that 9.6% of high school students have experienced some form of sexual misconduct. Black, Hispanic, and Native American Indian children are at greatest risk for sexual abuse. Also at increased risk are children with disabilities; the reason for this may be their greater need for individual attention and their possible problems with communicating.

Children who have been victims of educator sexual misconduct usually have low self-esteem, and they are likely to develop suicidal ideation and depression. Because the abuser was a person the child was encouraged to trust, they may experience a sense of betrayal.

Shakeshaft also claimed that sexual abuse in public schools "is likely more than 100 times the abuse by priests."

In November 2024, Shakeshaft released a new book called "Organizational Betrayal: How School Enable Sexual Misconduct and How to Stop It. This book largely was researched when she appeared as an expert witness in cases about sexual misconduct and made agreements to be able to use the findings in her research. Otherwise she found it hard to get people to talk about educator sexual misconduct in K-12, which is the area she covers.

She writes in the book that more than the perpetrator is complicit in the continuing child sexual abuse by school employees. She states the entire community bears responsibility from teachers who suspected but did not say anything to administrators who ignored the allegations to leadership. In fact, she writes "We are all complicit."

Shakeshaft concludes that one of the reasons there haven't been more studies on educator sexual misconduct is that as a society there isn't a will to know. She discusses this in a Harvard Graduate School of Education interview where she stresses the importance of reporting boundary violations and states she hasn't seen a person's life ruined by a report that wasn't of concern. She states, "So sexual misconduct is targeting a student in a sexual way. It could be language. It could be behaviors. It could be sharing pornographic materials. The behaviors can be anyplace from playing with their hair and talking to them about sex, to hugging in a sexual way, to sexual intercourse."

In the interview, Shakeshaft also states that the problem seems to be increasing from the 9.6 percent figure she found in 2004 to a 17.4 percent of students in public schools who have experienced educator sexual misconduct as found in a study "Title IX Policy Implementation and Sexual Harassment Prevalence in K-12 Schools" by Billie Jo Grant et al published in the 2023 Educational Policy publication using data from the 2018-2019 year.

Shakeshaft uses 132 cases of employee sexual misconduct that she wrote reports on to provide the basis for her research in "Organizational Betrayal." She states that she is often asked why educators would sexually abuse students and her answer is "because they can." She writes that not enough is being done to protect students.

Trends that she notices are that boundary violations start small and then become normalized and afterwards increase. For example, she states hugs can be a boundary violation but if no one mentions the red flag, this is seen as standard conduct, and a potential abuser can move on to more touching after having normalized it with the students and also the observers. She's seen that abusers are often well-regarded and liked in the school, and that other school staff are reluctant to report boundary crossing in a way they wouldn't be if they found a gun on the stairwell. She states that there isn't enough education around grooming and boundary crossing behaviors for bystanders to understand and intervene. In addition, she notes administrator resistance, staff and student support for the perpetrator, mass outrage by parents, and punishing of the victim as possible outcomes in the cases she's researched.

She states that red flags include covering the windows and doors of a classroom even if it with student art since it means behavior inside can't be observed, an educator spending alone time in a classroom with a student, an educator giving a student rides home, as well as becoming close with the students' family to build trust.

In their 2002 survey, the American Association of University Women Educational Foundation reported that, of students who had been harassed, 38% were harassed by teachers or other school employees. One survey that was conducted with psychology students reports that 10% had sexual interactions with their educators; in turn, 13% of educators reported sexual interaction with their students. In a national survey conducted for the AAUW Educational Foundation in 2000, it was found that roughly 290,000 students experienced some sort of physical sexual abuse by a public school employee between 1991 and 2000.

In 1995, the CDC replicated part of this study with 8,810 students on 138 college campuses. They examined rape only, and did not look at attempted rape. They found that 20% of women and 4% of men had experienced rape in the course of her or his lifetime.

On campuses, it has been found that alcohol is a prevalent issue in regards to sexual assault. It has been estimated that 1 in 5 women experience an assault, and of those women, 50–75% have had either the attacker, the woman, or both, consume alcohol prior to the assault. Not only has it been a factor in the rates of sexual assault on campus, but because of the prevalence, assaults are also being affected specifically by the inability to give consent when intoxicated and bystanders not knowing when to intervene due to their own intoxication or the intoxication of the victim.

A 2007 survey by the National Institute of Justice found that 19.0% of college women and 6.1% of college men experienced either sexual assault or attempted sexual assault since entering college. In the University of Pennsylvania Law Review in 2017, D. Tuerkheimer reviewed the literature on rape allegations, and reported on the problems surrounding the credibility of rape victims, and how that relates to false rape accusations. She pointed to national survey data from the Centers for Disease Control and Prevention that indicates 1 in every 5 women (and 1 in 71 men) will be raped during their lifetime at some point. Despite the prevalence of rape and the fact that false rape allegations are rare, Tuerkheimer reported that law enforcement officers often default to disbelief about an alleged rape. This documented prejudice leads to reduced investigation and criminal justice outcomes that are faulty compared to other crimes. Tuerkheimer says that women face "credibility discounts" at all stages of the justice system, including from police, jurors, judges, and prosecutors. These credibility discounts are especially pronounced when the victim is acquainted with the accuser, and the vast majority of rapes fall into this category. The U.S. Department of Justice estimated from 2005 to 2007 that about 2% of victims who were raped while incapacitated (from drugs, alcohol, or other reasons) reported the rape to the police, compared to 13% of victims who experienced physically forced sexual assault.

=== Psychology and behaviors of perpetrators ===
Most complaints about a teacher's behavior tend to center around what is felt to be inappropriate speech in a class or discussion, such as using sexist or sexual references to make a point. However, in some cases, bonds and relationships can form between teacher and student beyond class discussions. Relationships between students and teachers can be often quite intimate and intense as they share common passions and interests. Students are dependent on their teachers' approval for academic success, opportunities, and later career success. They will talk about personal issues, such as problems at home, or with boyfriends/girlfriends. Such closeness and intimacy can blur the professional boundaries and lead teachers to feel comfortable taking advantage of a student. Martin writes,

...teachers hold positions of trust. They are expected to design teaching programmes and carry out their teaching duties to help their students develop as mature thinkers. This may involve close working relationships in tutorials or laboratories, individual meetings to discuss projects or essays, and more casual occasions for intellectual give and take. For impressionable young students, the boundaries between intellectual development and personal life may become blurred. In this situation, some academics easily move from intellectual to personal to sexual relationships.

A teacher who harasses a student may be doing so because he or she is experiencing the stress from various personal problems or life traumas, such as marital trouble or divorce, a professional crisis, financial difficulties, medical problems, or the death of a spouse or child. Even though the behavior is unacceptable, it can be a symptom of the effects of such stresses, and may stop if the situation changes, or the pressures are removed.

=== Sexual relationships between students and teachers ===
There has been debate over whether or not sexual interactions and relationships between students and teachers constitute sexual abuse.

While sexual relationships with pupils is illegal in the U.S., this is not the case in higher education. Literature professor Jane Gallop argues that students learn more effectively in a sexually charged atmosphere. In her book, she describes the separate occasions she slept with two male professors on her dissertation committee, and when she first began sleeping with her own students as an assistant professor. (Gallop, 1997). In her September 2001 essay in Harper's Magazine, The Higher Yearning, academic Christina Nehring celebrated the educative nature of such sexual relationships: "Teacher-student chemistry is what fires much of the best work that goes in universities, even today".

However, in recent years, there has been controversy over consensual sexual interactions between students and teachers, especially within the last decade. Like many, Gallop asserts that the relationships between a teacher and a student is very much like that of a parent and a child. (Gallop, 1997) However, it is this parallel that many say is the reason teacher-pupil sexual contact and relations are immoral because they are too closely akin to incest, and similar long-term damages can result.

Many experts argue that even consensual sexual interactions between students and teachers constitute sexual harassment. The most commonly expressed concern is over whether "mutual consent" can exist in a relationship where there is such a disparity in power between the people involved. Because of this, more and more schools are adopting policies that forbid amorous relationships between students and professors "in the instructional context" even when they are consenting (Smithson, 1990). Dzeich et al. writes:

Physical intimacy with students is not now and never has been acceptable behavior for academicians. It cannot be defended or explained away by evoking fantasies of devoted professors and sophisticated students being denied the right to 'true love.' Where power differentials exist, there can be no 'mutual consent.'

— Dzeich et al., 1990

In an interview with the Chronicle of Higher Education, a dean at the University of Texas at Austin stated he'd like to crack down on consensual relationships between professors and students. "Wait until she graduates," he says he tells male professors. "We have a kind of sacred trust to the students," he explains. "They're coming here to get us to evaluate what their abilities are and what their future could be. These relationships poison the whole academic well."

Dzeich argues that much damage occurs because of the betrayal by someone that the student trusted and respected. Moreover, seduction attempts which are masked by pretenses to academic and personal attention are particularly damaging because the student feels complicit in their own abuse. (Dzeich 1990)

Another consequence is that, when sex is an accepted behavior between teachers and students, it can be more difficult to raise concerns about sexual harassment. For example, unwanted sexual advances by a professor may be intimidating or even frightening; however, if sexual relations between staff and students is common at the school, it will be difficult for a student to identify this behavior as harassment. (Martin, 1993)

==== Abuse of trust and conflicts of interest ====
Sexual relations between teachers and students raises concerns about the abuse of trust and conflicts of interest—and these points are not usually covered in sexual harassment policies.

The question of abuse of trust comes into play when sexual relations between teacher and student are present. This occurs when the trust associated with a professional relationship is destroyed because of non-professional actions or requests for non-professional actions. Martin writes, "Teachers are in a position of authority and trust to foster the intellectual development of their students. When they engage in sexual relations with a student, they violate that trust implicit in a professional teacher-student relationship." (Martin, 1993)

Conflicts of interest can arise when the professional responsibilities of a teacher are affected, or appear to be affected, by a special personal relationship with a student. These can include showing favoritism towards a student sexually involved with the teacher, or hostility towards a student due to a past relationship. If a teacher is sexually involved with a student, colleagues may feel pressured to give preferential treatment to the student, such as better marks, extensions on essays, extra help, or academic opportunities. When there are multiple relationships between several staff and students, the possibilities for conflict of interest are enormous. Even if there is no favoritism or hostility, it can be perceived by others to be exhibited.

== Special education ==
Like all other students, students with disabilities experience sexual harassment in school as victims and perpetrators. Some disabilities could cause a lack of control over impulses, a lack of awareness of the effects of their words and actions, and a lack of social skills needed to avoid sexually harassing behavior. In some circumstances, a student with disabilities could exhibit a behavior that would constitute sexual harassment without intentionally trying to be malicious or inappropriate. In these cases, where a disability could lead to sexually harassing behaviors, positive behavior intervention plans are often put into place by a team often including parents, school administrators, general education teachers, special education teachers, school psychologists, and counselors. These types of plans could also be made during Individualized Education Program meetings regarding the student.

== Independent schools ==
In 2018, independent schools created a Prevention and Response Task Force Report to provide guidelines for independent schools, yet this does not have much accountability built in to the system.

One school is Sonoma Academy where a group of alumnae formed the Athena Project to have the school investigate (and subsequently) fire a teacher who had groomed female students for decades, as found by a report the school funded.

This school is represented by the same law firm Folger Levin that represents other Bay Area independent schools that had investigations that found educator sexual misconduct such as University High School and Branson in California. (Close to Sonoma.) In the Branson and University reports there was an educator who moved between schools despite it being common knowledge that he had dated a student. Years later the student sued and brought the issue to more light in 2021.

An earlier example is the Marlborough School where an investigation that ended in 2014 found that the sexual harassment claims of a former teacher by a student did have merit and that there was a "'pattern of misconduct' by the teacher and 'mistakes in judgment' by top school officials, leading to the resignation of the school’s chief administrator," according to the Larchmont Buzz.

Vanity Fair covered the ensuing scandal in 2015 that chronicles how one student's essay online about sexual misconduct (which includes harassment) by an English teacher led another student to come forward who had been raped earlier by the same teacher. In 2015, the teacher Joseph Koetters was sentenced to a year in jail for engaging in sex acts with this student and another 16-year-old girl.

The teacher was accused of inappropriate emails in 2012 at Marlborough and then when he left to teach at Polytechnic School they knew about the allegations as well before they hired him because of calls from the school and the mother of the student who reported inappropriate behavior also called, according to Buzzfeed. That article explores how at Marlborough "the cult of personality around Koetters was so intense it was difficult to come forward at the exclusive, high-pressure school."

In 2023, a second report on sexual misconduct was published by the boarding school Thacher School in Ojai following a 2021 report that made national news. The New York Times stated in June 2021 of the first report,"The 91-page report, released on Wednesday, said students told investigators that their complaints were met with indifference and shame by administrators at the college preparatory school for grades nine through 12 in Ojai, a city of about 7,400 in Ventura County."

Around the same time, the Cate School in California released a report that, "Seventeen former faculty members or administrators of Cate School in Carpinteria have been identified as engaging in sexual misconduct with students, including grooming and sexual relations, with the earliest perpetrator a faculty member in the 1980s and 1990s."

The most recent case of sexual misconduct in the Cate report is that of Da’Jon James "who was director of vocal music from 2019–2020, and includes grooming, touching, kissing and sexual remarks. In the most serious allegation, substantiated by the report, a student described going to his room in November 2019 to watch television alone," according to Coastal View that quotes the investigation. James got a new teaching job in Colorado at the Alexander Dawson school and later "pleaded guilty to second-degree assault and sexual exploitation of a child, according to online court records" as stated in the Colorado Hometown Weekly

In 2018, a law called Pass the Trash was in effect in New Jersey that sets guidelines for reference checks that includes looking into sexual harassment, and also encompasses nonpublic schools. In 2022, an Education Department report showed that state policies on "pass the trash" were uneven.

== Private schools ==
A 2016 USA Today piece on how teachers who abuse find new jobs in education stated that, "Private schools and youth organizations are especially at risk. They are left on their own to perform background checks of new hires and generally have no access to the sole tracking system of teachers who were disciplined by state authorities."

The estimated amount of educator sexual misconduct is that one in ten students experiences this between K-12 based on 2004 data largely from public schools. Private schools that do not rely on government money do not need to release information about the rates of educator sexual misconduct. Starting in the late aughts and through the 2010s and into 20s, media reports and school investigations showed that the problem is prevalent in private schools as well.

Shakeshaft in "Organizational Betrayal" states that independent/private schools do experience current and historical misconduct, but are unique in that reputation is everything and their students can easily transfer to other schools. She quotes the National Association of Independent Schools that states schools must not interpret reputation as integrity and that the truest mesasure of institutional strength is integrity, which is tested with preventing and responding to educator sexual misconduct.

One of the early disclosures of historical educator misconduct was 2006 at St. Paul's in Concord, New Hampshire that has many times been the center of controversy over student sexual misconduct as well. The 2006 Vanity Fair piece "A Private School Affair" illustrated many of the issues that would be replayed in other sexual misconduct inquiries—resistance by the school, alumni activism, press coverage, concern over reputation, and cultural aspects of elite schools that may contribute to these scandals.

Horace Mann in the Bronx, NY in 2012 was found to have historical educator misconduct was uncovered in 2012 from as far back as the 1960s and often by serial offenders.

After the 2012 media reports, The Boston Globe published an investigation in 2016 on East Coast boarding schools that showed patterns similar to Horace Mann where misconduct was not addressed and added an aspect now called "pass the trash" in public schools where private school teachers were also given good references and sent to other private schools where they reoffended.

Educator sexual misconduct is a broad term that includes verbal and physical sexual abuse, and in 2004, the first study on the topic "The Shakeshaft Report" found that one in ten students experienced sexual misconduct before graduating from high school, and this may be an underestimation since researchers Carol Shakeshaft found that only six percent of students officially reported educator sexual misconduct. A 2020 study by the U.S. Department of Education's Office for Civil Rights based on data from the 2017-18 school year on sexual assault and rape also showed a growing problem. And a 2020 study "The Nature and Scope of Educator Misconduct in K-12" found the number had increased to 11.7 percent.

=== St. Paul's in Concord, New Hampshire ===
One of the early media articles on the subject was the 2006 Vanity Fair article, "A Private School Affair" that includes multiple controversies at St. Paul's School, an exclusive boarding school in Concord, New Hampshire that for more than a century educated the upper crust. The writer Alex Shoumatoff wrote two books on the history of private schools and saw them as microcosms of society.

Shoumatoff, an alumnus of St. Paul's, did not like the press treatment his school received after the controversies over financial impropriety, hazing, a student drowning, and allegations that dozens of teachers sexually abused students from the 1940s to early 1990s.

He reported that the sexual misconduct inquiry started with a student disclosure of past faculty sexual misconduct at a twenty-fifth reunion and some alumni joined a task force to present to the rector (the head). One former student was quoted as saying the board was protecting themselves after hearing first-hand accounts of misconduct.

The article also describes changes in the parent community at St. John's from the "artificial aristocracy" based on wealth and birth was being replaced by what Thomas Jefferson called the "natural aristocracy" of virtue and talent. One rector of St. Paul's in 1996 published an article that stated, ""Although the old-monied families still exert a considerable influence and control over their alma maters, they often do so in ways that reflect their own social and financial insecurities. ... caused the boarding school to do what it has often been accused of doing ... namely, to serve private rather than public interests."

=== St. Paul's student sexual misconduct ===
A book written about student sexual misconduct in 1990 at St. Paul's that was met with administrative inaction is Lacy Crawford's "Notes on a Silencing". The 2020 memoir reflects the #MeToo movement that gained prominence in 2017 and Crawford writes about women's uneasy relationships with institutions. The Washington Post's review of the book stated, "The book, which chronicles her assault at a boarding school, is a reminder of how adults willingly and knowingly serve up children to trauma in exchange for maintaining their reputations."

Another significant case involving St. John's was a 2014 sexual assault on freshman Chessy Prout during the "Senior Salute" tradition where senior-year males competed for freshman-year females that resulted in the well-publicized trial where the senior Owen Labrie who maintained the encounter was consensual. Chessy Prout co-wrote the book "I Have a Right to" published in 2018 and her family created a nonprofit with the same name.

In 2023, Prout's parents wrote an opinion article in the Citizen Times that described an institutional approach to treating victims of sexual assault as DARVO, a term coined by psychologist Jennifer Freyd that stands for deny, attack and reverse, victim and offender

A related concept is institutional betrayal another term coined by Jennifer Freyd or Organizational Betrayal, the name for a book coming out on the subject by Carol Shakeshaft, who studies how to prevent educator sexual misconduct.

In 2017, the New Hampshire Attorney General's Office started a criminal investigation into St. Paul's sexual misconduct going back decades but prompted by the Owen Labrie case. A grand jury reviewed thousands of documents and a 2018 settlement was reached that a state overseer would be established at the school. This Independence Compliance Officer's role is to ensure mandatory reports are made and after the first officer quit and reported it was because of retaliation by the school that didn't want investigations into criminal matters, the second officer has released at least one biannual report in July 2021 that found ten new reports of sexual assault.

=== Horace Mann in Bronx, NY ===
In 2012, The New York Times Magazine feature "Prep School Predators: Horace Mann School's Secret History of Sexual Abuse" was an early example of private school controversies that the writer Amos Kamil later made into a 2015 book, "Great is the truth: Secrecy, scandal and the quest for justice at Horace Mann School." This uncovered three teachers who had serially molested students at this elite private preK-12 in Bronx, New York from as far back as the 1960s that many administrators knew about but didn't stop, which also got coverage in New York Magazine and Newsweek in 2015.

Newsweek's 2015 piece on Horace Mann starts with a quote from the alumni group Making Schools Safe that independently funded an investigation when the school did not act, "Our goal is not to rehash or accuse, but simply to understand how more than twenty abusers operated for decades with little fear of reprisal."

=== Thacher School in Ojai, CA ===
This Boston Globe 2016 investigation prompted schools like the boarding school Thacher in Ojai, California to start investigations. Thacher eventually published two reports of historical sexual misconduct the last one issued in 2023. With the first report, the then-head of school Blossom Pidduck apologized for the historical failures. Past students who were interviewed for the investigation said that when they complained at the time of the instances, they were met with "indifference and shame," according to The New York Times.

This 2021 article states that the findings from the first Thacher report "echoes accusations that have roiled other prep schools in the last decade." The Venture County District Attorney's office said in December 2022 that it found more than 50 instances where the school failed to make a mandated report but that it was past the statute of limitations for those issues.

The National Association of Independent Schools' blog in 2021 that responded five years later to this Boston Globe article and was titled "The long-term vision for healing abuse on campus" that asked, "Was it more shocking that abuse happened or that schools worked so hard to conceal the truth?" The writer Vanessa Orange states, "Prestige has its pitfalls; the illusion of perfection can get in the way of acknowledging problems...Taking ownership of a problem on campus is an investment in trust between a school and the public."

Ten percent of United States students attended private schools in the 2021-22 school year, according to Pew Research. Public schools operate under federal Title IX rules for sexual harassment and discrimination and the federal K-12 law, the Elementary and Secondary Education Act, suggests states pass laws to prevent educator sexual misconduct. These laws do not apply to private schools.

=== St. Anne's in Brooklyn, NY ===
In 2024, New York Magazine published an article "The Shame of St. Anne's" about a 37-year-old teacher at the elite Brooklyn private school, Winston Nguyen, who had been arrested and charged with eleven felonies that included posing as a student on Snapchat and asking St. Anne's students to send him sexual images. Nguyen had served prison time for fraud before joining St. Anne's and that was known before his hire.

The article stated, "Parents say they feared interrogating leadership about Nguyen could be interpreted as their clashing with the school's liberal bent, and none of the 12 interviewed for this article would speak with their names attached, out of fear that they would upset the administration or get canceled by other parents for breaking ranks."

This is after a 2019 letter went out to parents with the results of an independent firm's sexual misconduct investigation that found nineteen former St. Anne's teachers or staff who had potentially engaged in inappropriate behavior or sexual misconduct from the 1970s to 2017.

=== Other cases ===
Vanity Fair covered similar scandals in feature articles "The Prep School and Predator" about Marlborough School in Los Angeles in March 2015, "St. George's Hidden Dragons" about St. George's in Rhode Island in 2016, "Dangerous Privilege" in 2016 also about St. Paul's, "The Code of Silence" in 2019 about Brett Kavanaugh's Georgetown Prep in Bethesda, Maryland, and "Mr. Weber's Confession" about Phillips Exeter in Exeter, New Hampshire in 2021.

In 2016, The Boston Globe published an article about sexual misconduct at New England boarding schools titled, "Private Schools, Painful Secrets: Educators accused of sexual misconduct often find new posts" that revealed trends on the subject that were not well known before this story.

In the overview video, the then-executive director of the Association of Boarding Schools Peter Upham said, "Thirty years ago wrongly or rightly, and it was probably wrongly, a lot of abuse was handled quietly. And what I think that demonstrated was a failure to recognize that people who abuse are likely to abuse again."

The Boston Globe's 2016 investigation surveyed all the boarding schools and got responses from ten percent of them. The investigation found that at least 67 private schools in New England were accused of employees abusing or harassing at least 200 students since 1991. This included eleven cases where employees who faced sexual misconduct and then went on to work at other schools.

This Boston Globe's Spotlight Team's investigation determined that boarding schools did not find the balance between investigating sexual misconduct allegations and protecting their reputation. That the schools often originally concealed or ignored allegations. In 2016, the article states that as private institutions the boarding schools were exempt from public records laws.

The article states that it can take decades for victims to report sexual misconduct in school. In the 2010s, this culture began shifting as victims began publicly describing their sexual misconduct from schools such as St. George's where in 2016 an investigation found 50 credible allegations of sexual misconduct by both staff and students; Phillips Exeter Academy that in 2016 admitted to not disclosing an award-winning teacher's sexual misconduct in the 1970s and 80s that led to other disclosures; and the boys' preK-9 day and boarding school the Fesseden School in Massachusetts that in 2016 also had extensive educator sexual misconduct uncovered from as far back as the 1960s. A commonality in these investigations is that they were often not reported to the law enforcement or child protective services as in some cases is mandated by law.

Other private schools that received media coverage for sexual misconduct include Presentation High School in San Jose, CA in 2018; Caitlin Gable School in Portland, OR; Cate School in Carpenteria, CA in 2022; and Greater Atlanta Christian (GAC) School in Norcross, Atlanta in 2024 among others.

In January 2025, Vanity Fair published an article "Girls, Interrupted: The Sex Abuse Scandal That’s Rocking Miss Hall’s, an Elite Berkshires Boarding School for Girls that stated that despite a trend in the 2010s for private schools to reckon with their pasts, the elite Miss Hall's "Astonishingly, Miss Hall's seems to have made the gamble to stay silent even as the world around it changed...Now stories...are flooding out from a brave group of women, going back decades, and they all bear striking similarities in their specific patterns...And that if that vulnerability [of girlhood] is pierced, it can shatter a life forever."

== Effects ==
=== In higher education ===
In their 2006 report, "Drawing the Line: Sexual Harassment on Campus" the AAUW found physical and emotional effects from sexual harassment on female students:

- 68% of female students felt very or somewhat upset by sexual harassment they experienced;
- 6% were not at all upset.
- 57% of female students who have been sexually harassed reported feeling self-conscious or embarrassed.
- 55% of female students who have been sexually harassed reported feeling angry.
- 32% of female students who have been sexually harassed reported feeling afraid or scared.

The AAUW also found that sexual harassment affects academics and achievement:

Students experience a wide range of effects from sexual harassment that impact their academic development including: have trouble sleeping, loss of appetite, decreased participation in class, avoid a study group, think about changing schools, change schools, avoid the library, change major, not gone to a professor/ teaching assistant's office hours. Students may experience multiple effects or just one. The wide range of experiences lowers the percentage of students who experience any particular effect.

- 16% of female students who have been sexually harassed found it hard to study or pay attention in class.
- 9% of female students dropped a course or skipped a class in response to sexual harassment.
- 27% of female students stay away from particular buildings or places on campus as a result of sexual harassment.

In the same 2006 report, the AAUW also found effects from sexual harassment on male and LGBT students:

- 35% of male college students reported feeling very or somewhat upset about being sexually harassed.
- 61% of male students reported feeling not very upset or not at all upset about experiencing sexual harassment.
- 20% of male students reported feeling worried about sexual harassment, to some extent.
- 60% of LGBT college students who were sexually harassed tried to avoid their harasser.
- 24% of LGBT college students who were sexually harassed had difficulties paying attention in class and studying.
- 17% of LGBT college students who had experienced sexual harassment have considered transferring to a different school and 9% made the transfer.

In 2018, a national advisory report of the National Academies of Sciences, Engineering and Medicine found that sexual harassment is rampant in academic science and concluded that sexual harassment should be treated as seriously as research misconduct. To report such behaviour is difficult for those concerned, given that scientists-in-training often dependent on a single high-profile mentor for research funding, job recommendations and fieldwork.

=== In K-12 education ===
While this issue was often discussed in higher education, K-12 Dive states that before 2016 it was rarely discussed in K-12 education despite being prevalent. K-12 Dive also reported the Office of Civil Rights recorded 350 sexual harassment complaints in 2012. By 2022, the Education Department’s civil rights enforcement arm reported more than double the amount at 833.

In public K-12, there has been more focus on educator sexual misconduct in the United States since the 2016 investigation by USA Today "Teachers who sexually abuse students still find classroom jobs." The article states that after a year-long investigation showed, "education officials put children in harm's way by covering up evidence of abuse, keeping allegations secret and making it easy for abusive teachers to find jobs elsewhere." It continued that schoolchildren continue "to be beaten, raped and harassed by their teachers while government officials at every level stand by and do nothing." USA Today found more than 100 teachers who were still working with children despite losing their licenses.

The article states abusive teachers make up an estimated one percent of the total number of teachers. Their investigation showed dozens who were accused of abusive behavior, lost that job, and then got hired at another job around students. This phenomenon is known as "pass the trash."

US News and World Report reported in 2022 that the federal K-12 Elementary and Secondary Education Act, "requires states to adopt laws and policies that prohibit school employers from assisting or 'aiding and abetting' employees or contractors in obtaining a new job if they are 'known or believed, with probably cause, to have engaged in sexual misconduct with a student or minor.'”

The 2015 Every Student Succeeds Act stated that any K-12 organization that got federal money needed to stop predatory teachers from getting new education jobs.

Still as of July 2019, the federal Department of Education lacked authority to ensure district compliance. In July 2019, Frontline Education provided a list of states that did have "Don't Pass the Trash" laws.

In 2024, a Harvard educator wrote that states and districts were still struggling to implement the Every Student Succeeds law's requirements.

After the 2016 USA Today investigation piece was published, there were reforms put into action. The article found "9,000 disciplined teachers were missing from the national teacher misconduct database operated by the non-profit National Association of State Directors of Teacher Education and Certification [NASDTEC]. The story and subsequent reports outlined widespread inconsistencies in how states handle teacher background checks and how they report problem teaches to NASDTEC."

In the follow up article, NASDTEC Executive Director Phillip Rogers said they called for an audit of all 50 state agencies about their submissions in the database.

In 2022, the Education Department published a "Study of State Policies to Prohibit Aiding and Abetting Sexual Misconduct" that found uneven policies among states with what is colloquially known as passing the trash. The state educational associations reported that the lack of sharing information between states caused problems. The study did discuss the database from the NASDTEC database that with a paid membership allowed states to track disciplinary actions on teachers licenses. The database was criticized for only including certified teachers.

The Federal Title IX of the Education Amendments of 1972 was known for trying to support female athletes especially at the collegiate level and to "prohibit sex discrimination in any educational program or activity that receives any federal funding," according to the 2024 Harvard Gazette. In 1992, Title IX was interpreted to also include sexual harassment and assault.

The Department of Education has redefined the term sexual harassment in a Dear Colleague letter in 2011 and 2020 during the Trump administration, and again in April 2024 issued more regulatory changes. Before 2021, when the Harvard Title IX coordinator described the general idea as "unwelcome conduct on the basis of sex that was severe, persistent, or pervasive, based on the totality of the circumstances" to 2020 where it was change to "severe, persistent, and pervasive" and then in 2024 to "a definition for hostile environment harassment, which is unwelcome sex-based conduct that, based on the totality of the circumstances, is subjectively and objectively offensive and is severe or pervasive."

Districts that have had educator sexual misconduct investigations covered in the media include Redlands Unified School District in California that was featured in the 2023 CBS documentary "Pledge of silence." Others are the Coronado School District in California where a 2019 article was published "Investigations into educator abuse vary wildly from school to school" and Long Island, New York, where Newsday in 2024 published an investigation into the secrecy of multiple districts.

=== By teachers ===
A reanalysis of the AAUW data found that victims of sexual harassment by teachers reported experiencing adverse health effects because of the abuse. 28% said that they had trouble sleeping and lost their appetite, 51% reported feeling embarrassed, and 37% indicated that they felt less sure of themselves or less confident as a result of the sexual harassment. Furthermore, 36% of the students said that they were afraid or scared and 29% reported feeling confused about their identity. In addition to negatively affecting health outcomes, teacher sexual abuse influenced the victims' academic performance. The affected students avoided the teacher (43%), they did not want to go to school (36%), avoided talking in class (34%), had trouble paying attention (31%), cut classes (29%), or found it hard to study (29%).

==== The gender double standard ====
Some sources have discussed a double standard regarding the conduct of female versus male teachers. When it comes to sexual harassment or sexual abuse cases involving a male teacher as the perpetrator to a female student, severe punishments are often the result. According to David Ring, a lawyer working with sexual abuse cases, it is not uncommon for the male teachers to be convicted, face jail time, or owe partial civil damages to the student victim depending on the severity of the case. When a female teacher is the perpetrator of sexual harassment to a male student, there are arguments that the female teachers are given lighter sentences and the male victims are given lower amounts of compensation due to the reasoning that teenage males would be willing to have sexual encounters with older, female teachers as a response to changes in their hormones.

It has been argued that the effects of pupil-teacher sexual harassment vary depending on the gender of the student and the harasser. In some states in the U.S., sexual relations between a woman and an underage male did not even constitute statutory rape until the 1970s. Many assert that most boys would be happy to have a teacher show sexual interest in them. While the effects vary from student to student, evidence shows that both male and female victims exhibit similar psychological effects from pupil-teacher sexual harassment. In the long term, experts have suggested that victims experience issues with depression, addiction, and age-appropriate relationships.

== Complaints ==
In 1999, roughly 14% of complaints to the U.S. Department of Education Office of Civil Rights (OCR) involved sex discrimination. "Sexual harassment is as serious (and some would say more serious) a problem as it is in the workplace....(it) is not a new phenomena. But it is only recently that the Supreme Court has said that schools can be held liable for money damages for sexual harassment."

The U.S. judicial system does not analyze the types of harassment in the same way they do harassment in the workplace. Instead, the US Supreme Court ruled in Gebser v. Lago Vista Independent School District (1998) that it "will not hold a school district liable in damages under Title IX for a teacher's sexual harassment of a student absent actual notice and deliberate indifference."

However, many harassment targets fear to make reports because of the possible repercussions. Of the women who have approached her to share their own experiences of being sexually harassed by their professors, feminist author Naomi Wolf wrote:

I am ashamed of what I tell them: that they should indeed worry about making an accusation because what they fear is likely to come true. Not one of the women I have heard from had an outcome that was not worse for her than silence. One, I recall, was drummed out of the school by peer pressure. Many faced bureaucratic stonewalling. Some women said they lost their academic status as golden girls overnight; grants dried up, letters of recommendation were no longer forthcoming. No one was met with a coherent process that was not weighted against them. Usually, the key decision-makers in the college or university—especially if it was a private university—joined forces to, in effect, collude with the faculty member accused; to protect not him necessarily but the reputation of the university, and to keep information from surfacing in a way that could protect other women. The goal seemed to be not to provide a balanced forum, but damage control.

In addition, there are many inconsistencies regarding some technology-based sexual harassment and abuse laws. Individual states must try to prosecute the crimes via existing, usually outdated, laws such as those for "peeping Toms" or breach of privacy. In Kansas, for example, a private school teacher is being charged under outdated breach of privacy law for recording over 100 female students in a state of undress over a period of 5 years. The Kansas law includes the word "telegraph", a service whose main provider ceased offering the service in 2006. The US Supreme Court has yet to set a precedent in this area of the law. These students are further being victimized, beyond the existing trauma of abuse, by injustice.

== Court cases ==
=== Franklin v. Gwinnett County (GA) Public Schools (1992) ===
In 1992, the Supreme Court decided that, out of the violation of their civil rights, students who were victims of sexual harassment have the right to seek monetary damages from their school district. This was a major step taken by the Supreme Court where before this decision, compensation was not up for grabs from the damage in sexual harassment cases.

=== Davis v. Monroe County Board of Education ===
In 1994, when a judge ruled that the school district was not liable for the sexual harassment that occurred when a fifth grade boy allegedly made attempts to inappropriately touch a female student, the case made its way to the Supreme Court. In 1999, the Supreme Court decided that once sexual harassment among peers has been reported to a school district, they must be held responsible.

=== Bruneau v. South Kortright (NY) Central School District (1996) ===
When a sixth grade girl was sexually harassed by some of her male peers, under Title IX, she was able to file charges against her school district, teacher, and assistant superintendent, and receive compensation for the damages. Ultimately, because the school district was made aware of the situation and failed to address it, they were found liable for this incident.

== Handling in schools ==
Schools, under Title IX, are required to investigate a situation where there is a report of sexual harassment as well as formally addressing the issue to students, staff, and parents as a preventative measure.

In a study conducted by the AAUW in 2011, of 7th to 12th grade students, only 12% of the surveyed students felt that their school did enough to address sexual harassment.

=== In colleges and universities ===
When college students were surveyed, it was found that 35% do not tell anyone about a sexual harassment occurrence, 49% tell a friend, and only 7% go to a school faculty member to report the incident. Female students especially were noted to hesitate to report these incidents in fear that the incidents are not important enough or a large enough deal. 54% of the surveyed college students listed this as a reason for not reporting sexual harassment.

=== Policies and procedures ===
79% of surveyed college students know of sexual harassment policies in their colleges. The U.S. Department of Education's Office for Civil Rights has mandated that schools create policies for sexual harassment as well as procedures for how to handle reports of these instances. The Office for Civil Rights' guidelines for effective sexual harassment policies include:

- Issuing a policy against sex discrimination
- Incorporating grievance procedures
- Creating specific investigation plans and timelines
- Explaining where one can file a report
- Designating one person (at least) to be the Title IX coordinator for complaints and provide the school faculty and students with that person's contact information
- Creating a disciplinary plan for the perpetrators
- Ensuring that all of the sexual harassment policies and procedures are easily accessible to students, teachers, faculty, and parents

Along with sexual harassment policies in colleges and universities, brochures or informational handouts are often distributed, and there are often designated locations or personnel on campus where victims can report sexual harassment. Under Title IX, schools that receive federal funding must designate a coordinator to whom those who need to report sexual harassment can go to, as well as who can receive suggestions and feedback from students on how to improve upon how the school is dealing with sexual harassment. This is required of all schools who receive federal funding, not only in higher education.

=== Prevention ===
Aside from dealing with sexual harassment as it occurs, using the designated procedures, prevention is often used to eliminate sexual harassment before it begins, particularly in schools. The U.S. Department of Education's Office for Civil Rights has stated that training is part of the prevention of sexual harassment in schools and in their 2001 publishing of Sexual Harassment Guidance: Harassment of Students by School Employees, Other Students or Third Parties, they have indicated that not only should academic institutions provide faculty and teacher training, but also provide students with classroom resources in order to make them aware of what constitutes sexual harassment and what to do if it occurs. It is often recommended that consistent anti-sexual harassment workshops begin in the younger grades so that students remain informed and the policies are strongly enforced.

== See also ==
- Bullying in academia
- Bullying in teaching
- Catholic sex abuse cases
- Charol Shakeshaft
- Child sexual abuse
- Mary Kay Letourneau
- Pamela Rogers Turner
- Professional abuse
- Rape of college women
- School bullying
- Scouting sex abuse cases
- Sexual harassment
- Sexual harassment in education
