= Position of trust =

Overview of concept

A position of trust is any position that grants a person authority over another person or people, or valuable things, and carries a legal and ethical obligation to appropriately exercise that authority. The term may be used in a more restricted sense as defined by an organization or by legislation.

According to one common definition, it is any position that has liability for "cash, keys, or kids (minors)". The concept of "keys" refers to security, including IT security and management.

Crimes may be punished more severely if committed by a person in a position of trust, and people proposed for positions of trust may be subject to background checks, and scrutiny of their actions.

== Parties involved ==
A typical position of trust at the personal level involves child custody or power of attorney. The same would be true for the five standard professions; medicine, law, finance, education and engineering. Any regulated profession dealing with the health and safety of others usually requires certification and licensing and would be a position of trust. The same would be true in the hierarchy of relationships involved in education, employment, financial matters and government.

== Sexual relations ==
In the United Kingdom, the Sexual Offences Act 2000 prohibits a person in a position of trust from performing sexual acts with someone who cannot consent, which includes minors and "very vulnerable people". This is primarily used for the protection of young people who are above the age of consent but under the age of 18 and for the protection of people with mental disabilities. Only after a person is no longer in a position of trust may they pursue a sexual relationship with a person previously entrusted to them. Similarly, molestation by a person in a position of trust is also a criminal offence in Singapore punishable by imprisonment.

In the Netherlands, incest itself is not prosecutable, but if an adult commits incest with a family member that is a minor, the adult can be prosecuted for abusing his/her position of trust. The adult family member does not have to be biologically related to the minor to be prosecutable for this offence. The relevant legislation also applies to adults who are family members only by marriage.

== See also ==
- Conflict of interest
- Misplaced loyalty
- Profession
- Professional abuse
- Professional ethics
- Professional responsibility
- Supervisor
