= Biology of trust =

The biology of trust is the study of physiological mechanisms involved in mediating trust in social attachments. It has been studied in terms of genetics, endocrinology and neurobiology.

Trust is the intentional choice to believe the input of strangers because one believes they know the truth and have one's best interest at heart. Trust is important in creating social attachments.

Social bonds is a characteristic present in many mammals and other vertebrae species. However, there exists a paradox in the formation of social bonds in humans- while there are benefits, drawbacks, such as judgment, vulnerabilities to harmful physical and emotional hurt do exist. And overarching all of this is trust, which is marked by the intentional choice to rely on another individual for an underlying purpose, despite drawbacks- a factor in social bonds with biological implications.

== Neural Mechanisms ==
Neuropeptides, specifically oxytocin (OT) and arginine-vasopressin (AVP), have been shown to be involved in physiological mechanisms of social behavior. Sex hormones, have also been correlated. The involvement of OT and AVP in trust and social attachment can be attributed the fact that both molecules can be released as neurotransmitters or hormones throughout the body. OT and AVP act as neurotransmitters when released directly by the hypothalamus; they act as neurohormones when released peripherally by the pituitary gland. So, both AVP and OT are peripheral (functioning throughout the body) and central (functioning within the brain).

Both social bonding and social attachment involve OT. In female rats that had OT injected directly into the brain, studies found that the OT rats exhibited full maternal behavior towards foster pups. In studies involving human subjects, increases in OT were observed in subjects who received intentional trust signals in a controlled trust game. When an OT receptor antagonist was injected in rats, it was found that there was a decrease in social recognition and decreased social bonding. In a similar study, injection of central or peripheral OT in the lateral septum or main olfactory bulbs showed an increase in social recognition and interaction. Studies have also shown the integration of OT with Dopamine (DA) and AVP in social bonding. Function of DA neurons on OT receptors bound in the striatum strengthen social attachment by directing the reward pathways in which DA is involved with towards behavioral trust.

Social recognition memory also involves AVP. In a study conducted on Brattleboro rats that carried a mutation inhibiting AVP production, injection of central and peripheral AVP was correlated with an improvement in social recognition. As with OT, injection of AVP receptor antagonist was followed by impaired social bonding and recognition. In male titi monkeys, injection of AVP increased social behavior towards their female partner. In human studies, AVP has also shown to increase pro-social behavior towards their significant other. The effects of AVP are reinforced by its integration with OT. In a study in which rats received increased peripheral or central OT and AVP, the rats with increased OT or AVP exhibited an increase in huddling and sharing food with other rats.

Social bonding is mediated several brain areas which respond to OT, AVP, and DA. Studies using fMRI have been used in research to assess associated brain areas in human attachment based on auditory and visual stimuli responses of the brain to attachment target. These studies found that the ventral tegmental area (VTA) and ventral striatum in the brain were activated during responses to attachment target. Further research in fMRI studies have shown that the amygdala, nucleus accumbens (NA), hypothalamus, sub-cortical and cortical reward neural networks are also involved mediating social attachment. These networks and pathways contain receptors that allow OT, AVP, and DA to exert their effects in high and low level processes in the brain that provide a foundation for social trust. In studies with human subjects who experienced social isolation, there was an increase in activity in the hypothalamic-pituitary-adrenal (HPA) axis-a neural network involved in the release of cortisol, a stress-response hormone. This same research showed a deactivation in brain regions associated with OT and AVP.
