= Sexual misconduct =

Misconduct of a sexual nature; legal term in some jurisdictions

Sexual misconduct is misconduct of a sexual nature that exists on a spectrum that may include a broad range of sexual behaviors considered unwelcome. This includes conduct considered inappropriate on an individual or societal basis of morality, sexual harassment and/or criminal sexual assault.

However generally, from a purely legal standpoint, sexual misconduct is a "lay term" that represents a boundary that has been broken, dictated by a moral set of conduct, particularly where the situation is normally non-sexual and therefore unusual for sexual behavior, or where there is some aspect of personal power or authority that makes sexual behavior inappropriate. A common theme, and the reason for the term misconduct, is that these violations occur during work or in a situation of a power imbalance (such as sexual harassment).

The alleged misconduct can be of various degrees, such as exposure of genitals, assault, aggressive come-ons, pleading, or even inattentiveness to nonverbal cues of discomfort. The "definition of sexual misconduct is far from clear" and it is a "lay term, sometimes used in institutional policies or by professional bodies", to deal with cases marked by power imbalance, coercion, and predatory behaviour."

== Definitions ==
In the legal sense, for a person in a position of authority, it includes in particular any sexual activity between them and one of their subordinates. This commonly includes teachers and their students, clergy and their congregants, doctors and their patients, and employers and their employees. While such activity is usually not explicitly illegal, it is often against professional ethical codes. For example, a teacher may be fired and a doctor may have their medical license revoked because of sexual misconduct. In addition, the person in the subordinate position may allege sexual harassment. The University of Iowa defines sexual misconduct as "...unwelcome behavior of a sexual nature that is committed without consent or by force, intimidation, coercion, or manipulation."

Entering a sexual relationship with a subordinate, even when the contact is initiated by the latter, is considered unethical by some because of the subordinate's vulnerability to the superior and the inequality of power that characterizes the relationship. In the case of the doctor-patient relationship, having a sexual relationship with the patient even after the professional relationship has concluded is considered problematic for the physician because of the potential for the patient's continuing dependence on and transference towards the physician. Therefore, sexual relationships with former patients are considered unethical by the medical profession when physicians "use or exploit the trust, knowledge, emotions or influence derived from the previous professional relationship" in any way. By contrast, legal ethics permit sexual relations with former client and, in California, with current clients as well so long as the sex is consensual and is not rendered in exchange for legal services.

Some activities which are not strictly erotic, e.g. mooning (exposing the buttocks), streaking (running naked through a public area) and skinny dipping (swimming naked), are sometimes also categorized as sexual misconduct. Despite these opinions, others believe that sexual relations in workplace settings are not unethical including between boss and employee. Many companies do not prohibit so-called fraternization but instead recognize the difference between consensual dating and improper behavior.

According to Joanne Laucius from the Ottawa Citizen, the "definition of sexual misconduct is far from clear" and the "word 'misconduct' also lacks precision — it can be used as a catch-all for all kinds of behaviour, often obscuring what actually happened". Laucius states that the terms "sexual violence or sexual harassment and assault are much more specific terms that convey the nature of the allegations." Elaine Craig, an associate professor in the Schulich School of Law at Dalhousie University, states that "[s]exual misconduct is a lay term, sometimes used in institutional policies or by professional bodies. It covers an array of problematic sexual behaviour including sexual harassment, sexual assault and sexual abuse. Two of these terms have specific (and different) legal meanings: Sexual assault has a specific meaning in the criminal law context, unlike sexual misconduct, which may cover both criminal and non-criminal conduct."

Elizabeth Sheehy, the Shirley Greenberg Chair for Women and the Legal Profession at the University of Ottawa states that "[s]exual misconduct is a social issue and not a fixed line—it shifts as women gain access to economic and political equality. It's not found under criminal law, in human rights codes, or collective agreements. It might be found under professional disciplinary codes." She states that "we don't have a consensus on it, either", "...except that there are three key considerations. First, a power imbalance. Second, coercion, whether implicit or explicit. Third, predatory behaviour." Ally Crockford, a public educator at the Ottawa Rape Crisis Centre, states that "[s]exual misconduct is... a catch-all for behaviour that is not OK, but it's unclear how it should be classified. It could be any number of things—someone is made to feel uncomfortable, or they feel they are being watched or looked at in a certain way."

Michelle Cottle wrote in The Atlantic that the "...almost infinite shades of creepy misbehavior on display are challenging the legal and cultural categories used to describe them", as this issue is, in "...some ways, uncharted territory", making it "...hard to tell how the new lines will be drawn, much less where." Cottle states that "[m]illennials and younger Gen Xers seem to have a broader definition of what constitutes harassment as well as less hesitation about discussing their experiences".

== In education ==
A literature review of educator sexual misconduct published by the US Department of Education in 2004 written by researcher Charol Shakeshaft found that 9.6% of high school students have experienced some form of sexual misconduct. Black, Hispanic, and Native American Indian children are at greatest risk for sexual abuse. Also at increased risk are children with disabilities; the reason for this may be their greater need for individual attention and their possible problems with communicating.

== See also ==
- Buddhist ethics § Sexual misconduct
- Professional boundaries
- Sexual abuse
- Sexual bullying
- Sexual ethics
- Weinstein effect

== Notes ==
- Council on Ethical and Judicial Affairs (Nov 20, 1991). "Sexual misconduct in the practice of medicine". JAMA. 266 (19). American Medical Association: 2741–5. doi:10.1001/jama.266.19.2741.
- West, SG; Hatters-Friedman, S; Knoll, JL IV. (2010). "Lessons to learn: female educators who sexually abuse their students". Psychiatric Times. 27 (8): 9–10.
