= Assistant practitioner =

An Assistant practitioner, similar to a Nursing Associate is university/college-trained and paid at band 4 of the UK NHS Career Framework An Assistant Practitioner is a worker who competently delivers health and social care to and for people. They have a required level of knowledge and skill beyond that of the traditional healthcare assistant or support worker.

The Assistant Practitioner would be able to deliver elements of health and social care and undertake clinical work in domains that have previously only been within the remit of registered professionals. The Assistant Practitioner may transcend professional boundaries. They are accountable to themselves, their employer, and, more importantly, the people they serve. RCN AP Scope of Practice.

In the NHS Assistant Practitioners work as Occupational Therapy assistants, Diabetes team assistants. They also work in Radiotherapy treating patients with cancer. Diagnostic Radiography, Mammography, Nuclear medicine, District Nursing, strokes and rehabilitation, Podiatry, they also act as Patient Coordinators, Assistant Theatre Practitioners, primary care workers in Mental Health, Research, and IT support worker and assistant practitioner. Assistant practitioners can also be found working in community (such as clinics, patients' own homes, G.P. surgeries) and in hospitals (such as in wards, pathology laboratories, accident and emergency departments, medical physics departments etc.).

Depending upon the role and the nature of the work, Assistant Practitioners may be expected to work shifts.

Assistant practitioners can perform a wide range of skills once they have received training such as phlebotomy, cannulation, holistic needs assessment, urinary catheterisation, chemotherapy side effects and symptom assessment, delivering radiotherapy, performing X-rays, medication administration and deliver patient information. Some Assistant Practitioners will have a wider scope of practice than others. The skills that the AP has will depend on the trust they are working for and how far the AP would like to progress.

Working as an Assistant Practitioner overseas is much harder, the job is not recognised in the US in order to see if your qualifications will be accepted in countries other than the UK one must contact the licensing board for their chosen profession.

== Training ==
Training for Assistant Practitioner (AP) is completed through the NHS trust the employees of the AP. During training, the Trainee Assistant Practitioners (Also known as a TAP) will typically study towards a foundation degree, or BTEC higher national diploma-level qualification, on a part-time basis whilst working. During training, TAPs are paid on the NHS AFC pay scale band 3 and provided with full support and help from their employer.

=== Career Progression ===
Assistant practitioners may be allowed to progress through the career framework from a band 4 to a band 5 and become a fully qualified Practitioner (Nursing, Radiotherapy, Radiography, Podiatry, Mental Health, Occupational Therapy) depending on the area they have chosen.

== Supervision of the AP ==
Assistant Practitioners work under the day to day supervision of a registered member of staff. This can vary in nature and does not necessarily mean direct ‘line of sight’ supervision. A typical model would see the Assistant Practitioner undertaking tasks for which it has previously been agreed that they are competent to do, possibly with sign off at the end by a registered practitioner (as in the diagnostic imaging example) or reporting back to the supervisor if there are any specific issues that need clarification or confirmation (as in the community-based model). This latter model is often referred to as indirect or proximal supervision.
