= Generalized trust =

Trust that people have in members of society in general

Generalized trust, also known as spontaneous sociability, is the trust that people have in their fellow members of society in general. It is often measured in survey-based social science research by asking the question, "Generally speaking, would you say that most people can be trusted or that you can't be too careful in dealing with people?" This question has been included in the General Social Surveys in the United States, the World Values Survey, and the European Social Surveys. Unlike many other human behavioral traits, generalized trust has been found to exhibit a moderate to low heritability in behavior genetic studies, implying that culture is more important in the development of such trust than is genetics. The significant cross-national variation in levels of generalized trust also supports a significant role for cultural factors. It has been found to be associated with intelligence, happiness, and self-reported health.

Recent work in the organizational field indicates that generalized trust can change over time temporary as a response to daily work experiences and in a more meaningful way in response to major life changes and events such as taking on a new social role.
