= Professional responsibility =

Set of duties within professional ethics

Professional responsibility is a set of duties within the concept of professional ethics for those who exercise a unique set of knowledge and skill as professionals.

Professional responsibility applies to those professionals making judgments, applying their unique skills, and reaching informed decisions for, or on behalf, of others, as professionals. Professionals must be seen to exercise due care and responsibility in their areas of specialisation – known as professions.

What makes professionals unique, is that the general public would not ordinarily be expected to know in detail the skills and knowledge of a profession independently.

In a modern context, professional responsibility encompasses an array of the personal, corporate, and humanitarian standards of behaviour, as expected by clients, fellow professionals, and professional bodies.

== Origins and history ==
Professional responsibility historically applied to secularly-taught professions including medicine, law, and divinity or religion. The origins of this phrase date back to 1695, with the aforementioned split of the concept into three areas. The term continued to evolve alongside generally accepted responsibilities for professionals to become all-encompassing as it accommodated new emerging professions in modern societies.

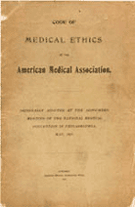
Code of Medical Ethics for the AMA, written by Thomas Percival

In the earlier history of the phrase 'professional responsibility', Thomas Percival (1740-1804) published one of the most notable professional codes for medical ethics, specifically for practising physicians in the United States governing their professional responsibilities as practitioners. Percival was also accomplished in founding one of the first known professional responsibility codes to be adopted by a professional body: The American Medical Association (AMA).

More recently, modern professionals and their networks continue to adopt the various codes of professional responsibility to suit their evolving modern professions. Research has shown that through implementation of common behavioural standards, the likelihood of interpersonal conflict decreases where honour and respect is encouraged. Professional responsibility acts as an organisational framework permitting professionals to assert practical independence in their fields, away from nominal employers, by way of service to their clients.

== Implementation ==
Professional responsibility is typically implemented by an organisation or institution's management, through what is commonly referred to as a code of ethics or similar guiding document of standards. A code of ethics sets out principles and rules to assist professionals and organisations to govern their implementation of the ideals of professional responsibility. A code of ethics also establishes a general idea of the ethical standards for businesses or other organizations.

Because professionals are persons conducting unique skills in their career of choice, ethics, responsibility guidelines and professional responsibility principles, should be applied simultaneously through organisations professionals work within, but also implemented in the individual's character, demeanour, and personal life. Professional responsibility is implemented to assess the moral dimension of human activity in occupations that have professional status, concerned with the moral conduct and standards governing the profession and its members.

Professional responsibility is defined by professional accepted standards of personal behaviour, moral values, and personal guiding principles. Codes for professional responsibility may be established by professional bodies or organizations to guide members in performing functions to a consistent ethical set of principles. In the rapidly globalised world, developments in technology for many occupations in different fields, mean that professionals must pay particular attention to this rapid growth.

Professional responsibility helps professionals to choose how to react to problems, by making choices and other approaches, drawing on perspectives through professional ethics. These perspectives can be reached through virtues, values, rules, other ethical theories, moral stances, moral decisions and moral compasses.

=== Common competencies of professional responsibility ===
Professional responsibility should be implemented through several components as general guidance for members of professional bodies. These competencies include:

- Honesty - being trustworthy, loyal, sincere, and fair
- Integrity - consistency between actions, values, expectations, and outcomes
- Transparency - operating where others can see what actions are performed
- Accountability - taking responsibility for actions and their outcomes wherever due
- Objectivity - having a well-informed unbiased view on practical matters
- Respectfulness - treating colleagues and clients with care and compassion
- Obedience to the law – adhering to regulatory and governmental guidelines

== Examples ==
=== The legal profession ===
Legal professionals and associates of the legal profession are bound by general codes of ethics, with governing principals of client privilege, confidentiality, completeness, and professional courtesy. This profession's responsibilities vary from jurisdiction to jurisdiction, but generally form a similar perspective internationally.

=== The medical profession ===
The American Medical Association imposes its code of ethics on practising medical professionals in the USA, which discusses issues ranging from workplace interpersonal relationships with staff, to the handling of critical information regarding patient care. Internationally, medical professionals often take the Hippocratic Oath, an oath of Greek origins, which encompasses the 'first do not harm' responsibility.

=== The business world ===
Businesses have codes of ethics to assist workers deducing whether behaviours would be considered appropriate or acceptable wherever dealing with clients and stakeholders. Some businesses will require their staff to attend recurring monthly or yearly training on business ethics. In some cases, employees may be required to sign declarations that they will adhere to the organisations ethical guidelines as laid out by the employer.

=== Teachers and education ===
Teachers and education professionals – such as those in tertiary institutions – often act as role models to students. Their code of ethics usually protects their students against mistreatment and protects the value of sharing knowledge through responsible communication.

=== Social protection ===
Welfare agencies and their professional staff have a duty to enquire about circumstances and not to take initial appearances and answers to questions at face value. Certain agencies in England were criticised in 2013 for "a woeful lack of professional curiosity" which should have informed their child protection work.

=== Table on common professional responsibilities ===
Common Responsibilities for Professions
| Legal | Medical | Business | Education |
| Confidentiality Competence Professional Courtesy | Trust Do No Harm Privacy | Integrity Teamwork Objectivity | Consideration Growth Communication |

== Examples of common violations in one field ==
Common violations in the legal field include:

- Conflicts of interest. This occurs where the same lawyer or firm is representing both sides in a lawsuit, or previously represented one side. In countries with the adversarial system of justice, a conflict of interest violates the right of each client to the undivided, zealous loyalty of his lawyer. Conflicts may also occur if the lawyer's ability to represent a client is materially limited by the lawyer's loyalty to another client, a personal relationship, or other reasons.
- Incompetent representation. Attorneys have a duty to provide competent representation, and the failure to observe deadlines or conduct thorough research is considered a breach of ethics.
- Mishandling of client money. Clients often advance money to lawyers for a variety of reasons. The money must be kept in special client trust accounts until it is actually earned by the lawyer or spent on court fees or other expenses.
- Fee-splitting arrangements. Attorneys may not split fees with non-attorneys, or with other attorneys who have not worked on the matter for which the client is represented.
- Disclosure of confidential information. Lawyers are under a strict duty of confidentiality to keep information received in the course of their representations secret. Absent law to the contrary, lawyers may not reveal or use this information to the detriment of their clients.
- Communication with represented parties. An attorney may not communicate directly with a person who they know to be represented by counsel with respect to a matter for which the attorney is seeking to communicate. For example, in a civil suit, the plaintiff's attorney may not speak to the defendant directly if the attorney knows that the defendant is represented by counsel without their attorney's express consent.
- Proper solicitation and advertising. Attorneys generally may solicit business by personally offering their services to potential clients who are not already close friends or family members. Advertising by attorneys is also strictly regulated, to prevent puffery and other misleading assertions regarding potential results.

Reports of violations will activate that profession's regulator to investigate and perhaps discipline the professional concerned.

== In the United States ==
=== In U.S. law schools ===
Following the Watergate scandal, which involved questionable behavior by a number of lawyers, the American Bar Association ("ABA") mandated that all American law schools incorporate a required course on this topic. This is typically offered as an upper-level course, most often taken in the second year. Professional responsibility courses include matters pertaining to basic legal ethics, as well as bar admissions, legal advertising, disbarment proceedings, ineffective assistance of counsel, and judicial misconduct.

Maynard Pirsig, published one of the first course books on legal ethics, Cases and Materials on Legal Ethics, 1949, later Cases and Materials on the Standards of the Legal Profession, 1957, and Cases and Materials on Professional Responsibility, 1965.

Maynard Pirsig also published the definition of legal ethics in Encyclopedia Britannica, 1974.

=== Examinations ===
Every state in the United States tests prospective attorneys on their knowledge of professional responsibility. Forty-seven states and the District of Columbia require bar applicants to pass an exam called the Multistate Professional Responsibility Exam (MPRE). The remaining three states test professional responsibility on their local bar examinations. Furthermore, the ABA promulgated the ABA Model Rules of Professional Conduct. in 1983; when Maine adopted the model rules in August 2009, California became the only remaining U.S. jurisdiction not to have adopted the model rules in whole or in part. Most states have only minor variations from the model rules, if any. Attorneys who violate professional responsibility rules may be subject to sanctions ranging from reprimands to temporary suspension to permanent disbarment.

== See also ==
- Legal malpractice
- Professional
- Professional abuse
- Professional ethics
- Professional negligence in English Law
- Category:United States professional responsibility case law
