= Trust capital =

Trust capital refers to the established trustworthiness of an entity, considered as a resource (or capital) which is gained or spent through various activities.

== Definitions of trust capital ==
The level of trust within companies determines how much trust capital they have. Unlike financial capital, trust capital is not subject to buy/sell transactions. It is related to Putnam's theory of social capital that is built up of trust, networks, and mutuality norms. Trust also “empowers and enables cooperation and decision-making, engenders the atmosphere of openness and transparency, enhances communication, and motivates and joins people together”. This is why trust capital is considered as a strategic resource of companies, especially for those which are based on knowledge, since trust facilitates knowledge sharing. Trust capital is a compound of:

- Reliability capital, that is received from others,
- Trustfulness capital, that is given to others.

They supplement each other and multiply their compounded effect, meaning the trust capital. The effect of trust capital is reduced by the impact of its opposite, distrust capital.

== Trust capital in working environments of knowledge companies ==
Trust capital plays an especially significant role in knowledge-intensive companies, which rely on team-based work. Where there is lack of trust, it is replaced by contracts. Since project team-based work is dynamic and fast, it is difficult to regulate with contract practices, and trust therefore plays a greater role. Trust is a strategic resource in knowledge companies, since these companies function in environments marked by risk and uncertainty. Jemielniak discovered in interviews that there is a great amount of distrust in the line between web programmers and managers, and between IT specialists and their clients. The reasons why this happens can be associated with lack of communication and social skills of IT specialists (“IT specialists are different than other people […] “Even, when it comes to make oneself understood. […] I often seen guys really specific at what they do, brainy, but unable to explain something in a clear way, to show how this or that solution works”).
