= Charol Shakeshaft =

American academic

- Born: 1949 (age 76–77)

Academic background
- Education: University of Nebraska–Lincoln (BA); Texas A&M University (MA, PhD)

Academic work
- Discipline: Educational researcher
- Institutions: Virginia Commonwealth University; Hofstra University

Charol Shakeshaft (born 1949) is an educational researcher noted for her studies on sexual abuse of students by school staff. She co-authored a four-year study on sexual abuse at school, which first appeared in March 1995, in the educational journal Phi Delta Kappan. Shakeshaft was chair of the Educational Leadership Department at Virginia Commonwealth University until 2017.

Shakeshaft was commissioned by the Department of Education to review the available literature on sexual misconduct with students by public school employees, and published her findings in 2004.

== Education ==
Shakeshaft earned a Bachelor of Arts degree in English literature from the University of Nebraska–Lincoln. She obtained a Master of Arts in organizational theory and a PhD in educational leadership and social science methods from Texas A&M University.

== Research ==
In 1994, Shakeshaft published a report based on a four-year study of 225 sexual abuse complaints—184 in New York State and 41 in other states—against teachers made to federal authorities from 1990 to 1993. She found that "All of the accused admitted sexual abuse of a student, but none of the abusers was reported to the authorities, and only 1 percent lost their license to teach. Only 35 percent suffered negative consequences of any kind, and 39 percent chose to leave their school district, most with positive recommendations. Some were even given an early retirement package."

In 2004, Shakeshaft published Educator Sexual Misconduct: A Synthesis of Existing Literature for the United States Department of Education. The report indicated that nearly 10% of U.S. public school students, or 4.5 million students, had been the victims of sexual harassment, rape or sexual abuse. The review described the prevalence of educator sexual misconduct, offender characteristics, targets of educator sexual misconduct, and recommendations for prevention of educator sexual misconduct.

In 2024, Shakeshaft published the book "Organizational Betrayal: How Schools Enable Sexual Misconduct and How to Stop It" through Harvard Education Press. The book is based on the cases where she acted as an expert witness and had permission to use this experience as her research. Only through these cases did she find full access to the range of experiences around educator sexual misconduct from administrators to victims to the communities affected.

== Media reports ==
According to a 2006 National Review Online opinion column republished by CBS News, Shakeshaft said that

"... the physical sexual abuse of students in [public] schools is likely more than 100 times the abuse by [Catholic] priests."

She estimated that about 290,000 students were victimized between 1991 and 2000. A 2004 editorial column in The Washington Post, noted the Educator Sexual Misconduct report was the first analysis of its kind. She studied nearly 900 documents to complete her analyzed research. Citing the Times-Picayune, however, the Post also noted that Shakeshaft's report had been criticized by two large teacher organizations, for not separating sexual harassment of students and actual molestation, lumping them both together, claiming that makes the problem seem worse than it is. The editor added,

"The fact that this report doesn't make those distinctions doesn't mean it isn't valid; it does mean that more research is needed. In fact, the report itself points out that there has been no nationally financed effort to collect data on sexual misconduct in schools."

A 2002 report in The New York Times quoted Shakeshaft as having written,

"Only 1 percent of the cases did superintendents follow up to ensure that molesting teachers did not continue teaching elsewhere. In 54 percent, superintendents accepted the teachers' resignations or retirements. Of the 121 teachers removed this way, administrators knew for certain that 16 percent resumed teaching in other districts... Moving molesting teachers from school district to school district is a common phenomenon. And in only 1 percent of the cases do superintendents notify the new school district. The term ’passing the trash’ is the preferred jargon among educators."

In 2007, a report in The Washington Post noted, "It's a dynamic so common it has its own nicknames: 'passing the trash' or the 'mobile molester.'" In addition, "Maine...has a law that keeps offending teachers' cases secret" and that

"in Hawaii, no educators were disciplined by the state in the five years the AP examined, even though some teachers there were serving sentences for various sex crimes during that time. They technically remained teachers, even behind bars."

The report also said, "Laws in several states require that even an allegation of sexual misconduct be reported to the state departments that oversee teacher licenses. But there's no consistent enforcement, so such laws are easy to ignore. School officials fear public embarrassment as much as the perpetrators do, Shakeshaft says. They want to avoid the fallout from going up against a popular teacher. They also don't want to get sued by teachers or victims, and they don't want to face a challenge from a strong union."

In 2013, Shakeshaft wrote an article "Knowing Warning Signs of Educator Misconduct" in Kappan Magazine.

In 2020, Shakeshaft gave a TedX talk, "A Call to Action: Stopping Sexual Abuse by School Employees."

== Media appearances ==
- Shakeshaft has been featured as an expert on The Oprah Winfrey Show.
- Shakeshaft was featured on an episode of THS Investigates titled "Hot for Student" (2007)
- Shakeshaft has appeared on National Public Radio.

== See also ==
- Sexual harassment in education
