= Professional =

Person who is paid to undertake a specialized set of tasks

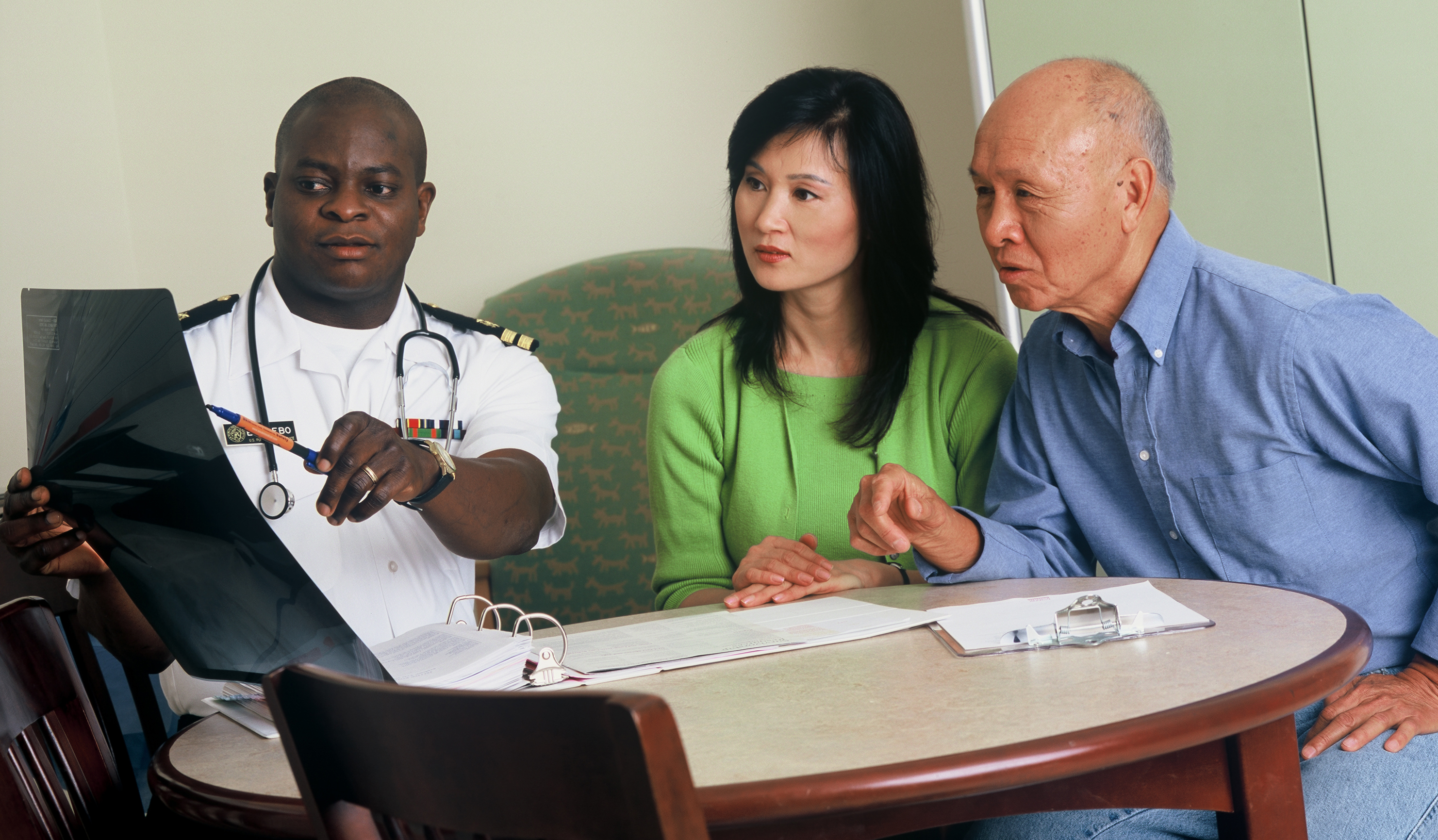
Doctor explains X-ray to patient.

A professional is a member of a profession or any person who works in a specified professional activity. The term also describes the standards of education and training that prepare members of the profession with the particular knowledge and skills necessary to perform their specific role within that profession. In addition, most professionals are subject to strict codes of conduct, enshrining rigorous ethical and moral obligations. Professional standards of practice and ethics for a particular field are typically agreed upon and maintained through widely recognized professional associations, such as the IEEE. Some definitions of "professional" limit this term to those professions that serve some important aspect of public interest and the general good of society.

In some cultures, the term is used as shorthand to describe a particular social stratum of well-educated workers who enjoy considerable work autonomy and who are commonly engaged in creative and intellectually challenging work.

== Trades ==
In narrow usage, not all expertise is considered a profession. Occupations such as skilled construction and maintenance work are more generally thought of as trades or crafts. The completion of an apprenticeship is generally associated with skilled labour, or trades such as carpenter, electrician, mason, painter, plumber and other similar occupations.

== Etymology ==
The etymology and historical meaning of the term professional is from Middle English, from profes, adjective, having professed one's vows, from Anglo-French, from Late Latin professus, from Latin, past participle of profitēri to profess, confess, from pro- before + fatēri to acknowledge; in other senses, from Latin professus, past participle. Thus, as people became more and more specialized in their trade, they began to 'profess' their skill to others, and 'vow' to perform their trade to the highest known standard. With a reputation to uphold, trusted workers of a society who have a specific trade are considered professionals. Ironically, the usage of the word 'profess' declined from the late 1800s to the 1950s, just as the term 'professional' was gaining popularity from 1900 to 2010. Notably, in American English the rise in popularity of the term 'professional' started at the beginning of the 20th century whereas in British English it started in the 1930s and grew fastest in the 1960s and 1970s.

== Guilds and licensing practices ==
The notion of a professional can be traced to medieval European guilds, most of which died off by the middle of the nineteenth century, except the scholars guild or university.

With most guilds formally abolished outside of the realm of academia, establishing exclusivity and standards in a trade (i.e. the successful professionalization of a trade) had to be achieved via other means such as licensing practices, of which might begin as an informal process established by voluntary professional associations, but then eventually become law due to lobbying efforts. Paralleling or soon after the fall of guilds, professional associations began to form in Britain and the US. In the US, several interested parties sought to emulate the model of apprenticeship that European guilds of the Middle Ages had honed to achieve their ends of establishing exclusivity in trades as well as the English concept of a gentleman which had come to be associated with higher income and craftsmanship. Examples are the Lazzaroni who lobbied to create the American Association for the Advancement of Science (AAAS) and professional associations who lobbied to create the American Medical Association (AMA). According to Miller et al., "Lazzaroni opposed reforms for no apparent reason other than that scientists outside of their tight-knit group proposed them.". In his seminal work The Transformation of American Medicine (1982) Paul Starr argues that a significant motivation in the development of the AMA was to gain authority over unlicensed practitioners to minimize competition among medical practitioners, thereby enhancing the earning power and prestige of medical professionals. The licensing process Starr argues, was unnecessarily prolonged and the costs were artificially enhanced with the specific aim of deterring potential practitioners from entering the field. In his book, The Early Development of Medical Licensing Laws in the United States, 1875–1900, Ronald Hamowy wrote:

"The American Medical Association (AMA) was established as a permanent national organization at Philadelphia in 1847 at a convention attended by some 230 delegates representing more than forty medical societies and twenty-eight schools. From its inception, one of its primary aims was upgrading medical education and a concomitant reduction in the number of physicians. Its committee on raising medical standards reported at its first meeting that "the large number of Medical Colleges throughout the country, and the facility with which the degree is obtained, have exerted a most pernicious influence" on the profession. With the object of alleviating this situation, recommendations were carried out calling for a specified minimum preliminary education as a prerequisite for admission to a medical college, a lengthening of the period of study for graduation from a medical school, including compulsory clinical instruction at a hospital before the issuance of a diploma, and professional participation in some licensing scheme for physicians. Indeed, the issue of education was considered so important by the AMA that one of its first acts was the establishment of a Committee on Medical Education..."

As technology progressed throughout the twentieth century, the successful professionalization of a given field was increasingly made possible through the idea of specialization.

As was the case with guilds who claimed to establish exclusivity in a trade in the name of serving the public good, there are often subtle dichotomies present in the idea of professionalizing a field, whether in the name of serving some notion of the public good or as a result of specialization. For example, while defenders of guilds have argued that they allowed markets to function by ensuring quality standards, Sheilagh Ogilvie had instead argued that markets of the Middle Ages flourished when guilds were abolished and that there is much evidence to support the notion that individuals prefer a wide variety of products of varying quality and price to be granted protections which they did not ask for, and which artificially constrain consumer options. Concerning modern forms of professional specialization, does specialization that accompanies technological advances naturally result in exclusivity, or have our licensing systems and laws been artificially engineered to limit the number of individuals who reach the point of specialization?

In certain cases, the want to specialize can adversely and negatively affect an industry. In his seminal work From Poor Law to Welfare State: A History of Social Welfare in America (1994) Walter Trattner argues that social workers began to emphasize individualized casework at the expense of alternative methods which utilize holistic approaches to address social issues.

In many cases, granting degrees through universities serves as one major component of licensing practices. Still, numerous legal stipulations and, in some cases, even informal social norms act in this capacity. Nevertheless, the university system constitutes one of the last remaining widely spread guild (or quasi-guild) and continues to serve as an indispensable means for the professionalization of fields of work. While it is true that most guilds disappeared by the middle of the nineteenth century, the scholars guild persisted due to its peripheral standing in an industrialized economy. In the words of Elliot Krause, "The university and scholars' guilds held onto their power over membership, training, and workplace because early capitalism was not interested in it...".

== See also ==
- Amateur
- Centre for the Study of Professions
- Organizational culture
- Professional boundaries
- Professional services
- Professional sports
- Semi-professional
- Professional-managerial class
