= Professional boundaries =

Relationship between any professional and their client

Professional boundaries are an important consideration in the relationship between any professional and their client.

== Nurse-client boundaries ==
Boundaries are an integral part of the nurse-client relationship. They represent invisible structures imposed by legal, ethical, and professional standards of nursing that respect the rights of nurses and clients. These boundaries ensure that the focus of the relationship remains on the client's needs, not only by word but also by law. The College of Nurses of Ontario (CNO) Standards identifies that it is the nurse's responsibility to establish the boundaries and limits of the relationship between the nurse and client. The boundaries have a specific purpose and health goal, and the relationship terminates when identified goal is met.

Any action or behaviour in a nurse-client relationship that personally benefits the nurse at the expense of the client is a boundary violation. Some examples of boundary violations are engaging in a romantic or sexual relationship with a current client, extensive non-beneficial disclosure to the client and receiving a gift of money from the client. Abuse and neglect are extreme examples. They involve the betrayal of respect and trust within the relationship. This includes withholding communication from a client because it is considered to be an example of neglect.

It is the nurse's job to be aware of signs that professional boundaries may be crossed or have been crossed. Warning signs of boundary crossing that may lead to boundary violations include frequently thinking of a client in a personal way, keeping secrets with a specific client, favouring one client's care at the expense of another's and telling a client personal things about yourself in order to make an impression. Anything that could comprise the client's well-being if the relationship with a registered nurse is continued or discontinued can be considered a warning sign. Boundary violations are never acceptable and it is the nurse's job to handle any situation with any regards to it professionally and therapeutically regardless of who initiated it.

== Clinical mental health counseling ==
There are multiple boundaries that could be crossed between a client and a counselor, including physical, psychological, emotional, and social boundaries. Some of these boundary lines may be blurry. For example, there are differing opinions on whether touch is ever appropriate between a counselor and their client. Sexual intercourse, however, is uniformly agreed upon as inappropriate. Dual relationships, where a counselor holds two or more different roles within a client's life at the same time, are also typically avoided, as well as the acceptance of gifts of significant monetary value.

== See also ==
- Profession
- Professional abuse
- Professional conduct
- Professional ethics
- Personal boundaries
- Sexual misconduct
