= Trust (sentiment) =

Assumption of and reliance on the honesty of another party

Trust in others in Europe in 2015

Country-level estimates of trust in 2018

Share of people agreeing with the statement "most people can be trusted" in 2014

Trust is the belief that another person will do what is expected and is built through repeated consistency. It brings with it a willingness for one party (the trustor or truster) to become vulnerable to another party (the trustee), on the presumption that the trustee will act in ways that benefit the trustor. In addition, the trustor does not have control over the actions of the trustee; however, those actions influence the trustor's positive, neutral, or negative evaluations regarding the trustworthiness of the trustee. Scholars distinguish between generalized trust (also known as social trust), which is the extension of trust to a relatively large circle of unfamiliar others, and particularized trust, which is contingent on a specific situation or a specific relationship.

As the outcome of trust is uncertain and depends on what one chooses to believe, the trustor can only evaluate and develop expectations based on the trustee's actions. Such expectations are formed with a view to the motivations of the trustee, dependent on their characteristics, the situation, and their interaction. The trustor's risk perception of failure or harm to themselves stems from the uncertainty of the trustee's behavior.

In the social sciences, the subtleties of trust are a subject of ongoing research. In sociology and psychology, the degree to which one party trusts another is a measure of belief in the honesty, fairness, or benevolence of another party. The term "confidence" is more appropriate for a belief in the competence of the other party. A failure in trust may be forgiven more easily if it is interpreted as a failure of competence rather than a lack of benevolence or honesty. In economics, trust is often conceptualized as reliability in transactions. In all cases, trust is a heuristic decision rule, allowing a person to deal with complexities that would require unrealistic effort in rational reasoning.

== Types ==
Types of trust identified in academic literature include contractual trust, competence trust and goodwill trust. American lawyer Charles Fried speaks of "contractual trust" as a "humdrum" experience based on the voluntary acceptance of contractual obligations: for example, people keep appointments and undertake commercial transactions. "Competence trust" can be defined as "a belief in the other's ability to do the job or complete a task"; this term is applied, for example, in relation to cultural competence in healthcare. In working relationships, "goodwill trust" has been described as "trust regarding the benevolence and integrity of [a] counterpart". Four types of social trust are recognized:

- Generalized trust, or a dispositional trait geared towards trusting others, is an important form of trust in modern society, which involves much social interaction with strangers. Schilke et al. refer to generalized and particularized trust (trust exhibited in a specific situation or a specific relationship) as two significant research streams in the sociology of trust.
- Out-group trust is the trust a person has in members of a different group. This could be members of a different ethnic group, or citizens of a different country, for example.
- In-group trust is placed in members of one's own group.
- Trust in neighbors considers the relationships between people with a common residential environment.

== Sociology ==
Sociology claims trust is one of several social constructs; an element of the social reality. Other constructs frequently discussed together with trust include control, confidence, risk, meaning and power. Trust is attributable to relationships between social actors, both individuals and groups (social systems). Sociology is concerned with the position and role of trust in social systems. Interest in trust has grown significantly since the early 1980s, from the early works of Luhmann, Barber, and Giddens (see Sztompka for a more detailed overview). This growth of interest in trust has been stimulated by ongoing changes in society, known as late modernity and post-modernity.

Sviatoslav contended that society needs trust because it increasingly finds itself operating at the edge between confidence in what is known from everyday experience and contingency of new possibilities. Without trust, one should always consider all contingent possibilities, leading to paralysis by analysis. Trust acts as a decisional heuristic, allowing the decision-maker to overcome bounded rationality and process what would otherwise be an excessively complex situation. Trust can be seen as a bet on one of many contingent futures, specifically, the one that appears to deliver the greatest benefits. Once the bet is decided (i.e. trust is granted), the trustor suspends his or her disbelief, and the possibility of a negative course of action is not considered at all. Hence trust acts as a reducing agent of social complexity, allowing for cooperation.

Sociology tends to focus on two distinct views: the macro view of social systems, and a micro view of individual social actors (where it borders with social psychology). Views on trust follow this dichotomy. On one side, the systemic role of trust can be discussed with a certain disregard to the psychological complexity underpinning individual trust. The behavioral approach to trust is usually assumed while actions of social actors are measurable, allowing for statistical modelling of trust. This systemic approach can be contrasted with studies on social actors and their decision-making process, in anticipation that understanding of such a process will explain (and allow to model) the emergence of trust.

Sociology acknowledges that the contingency of the future creates a dependency between social actors and, specifically, that the trustor becomes dependent on the trustee. Trust is seen as one of the possible methods to resolve such a dependency, being an attractive alternative to control. Trust is valuable if the trustee is much more powerful than the trustor, yet the trustor is under social obligation to support the trustee.

Modern information technologies have not only facilitated the transition to a post-modern society but have also challenged traditional views on trust. Information systems research has identified that people have come to trust in technology via two primary constructs: The first consists of human-like constructs, including benevolence, honesty, and competence, whilst the second employs system-like constructs, such as usefulness, reliability, and functionality. The discussion surrounding the relationship between information technologies and trust is still in progress as research remains in its infant stages.

=== High- and low-trust societies ===
A low-trust society is defined as one in which interpersonal trust is relatively low, and shared ethical values are lacking. Conversely, a high-trust society is one where interpersonal trust is relatively high, and where ethical values are strongly shared.

=== Influence of ethnic diversity ===
Several dozen studies have examined the impact of ethnic diversity on social trust. Research published in the Annual Review of Political Science concluded that there were three key debates on the subject:

1. Why does ethnic diversity modestly reduce social trust?
2. Can contact reduce the negative association between ethnic diversity and social trust?
3. Is ethnic diversity a stand-in for social disadvantage?

The review's meta-analysis of 87 studies showed a consistent, though modest, negative relationship between ethnic diversity and social trust. Ethnic diversity has the strongest negative impact on neighbor trust, in-group trust, and generalized trust. It did not appear to have a significant impact on out-group trust. The authors present a warning about the modest size of the effect, stating, "However, the rather modest size of the [overall negative relationship] implies that apocalyptic claims regarding the severe threat of ethnic diversity for social trust in contemporary societies are exaggerated."

== Psychology ==
In psychology, trust is believing that the trusted person will do what is expected. According to the psychoanalyst Erik Erikson, development of basic trust is the first state of psychosocial development occurring, or failing, during the first two years of life. Success results in feelings of security and optimism, while failure leads towards an orientation of insecurity and mistrust possibly resulting in attachment disorders. A person's dispositional tendency to trust others can be considered a personality trait and as such is one of the strongest predictors of subjective well-being. Trust increases subjective well-being because it enhances the quality of one's interpersonal relationships; happy people are skilled at fostering good relationships.

Trust is integral to the idea of social influence: it is easier to influence or persuade someone who is trusting. The notion of trust is increasingly adopted to predict acceptance of behaviors by others, institutions (e.g. government agencies), and objects such as machines. Yet once again, perceptions of honesty, competence and value similarity (slightly similar to benevolence) are essential.

There are three forms of trust commonly studied in psychology:

- Trust is being vulnerable to someone even when they are trustworthy.
- Trustworthiness are the characteristics or behaviors of one person that inspire positive expectations in another person.
- Trust propensity is the tendency to make oneself vulnerable to others in general. Research suggests that this general tendency can change over time in response to key life events.

These three factors can counteract each other. Sometimes, trust can be reduced by being more transparent about failed expectation, which increases trustworthiness but may reduce trust.

Once trust is lost by violation of some combination of these three determinants, it is very hard to regain. There is asymmetry in the building versus destruction of trust.

Research has been conducted into the social implications of trust, for instance:

- Barbara Misztal attempted to combine all notions of trust. She described three functions of trust: it makes social life predictable, it creates a sense of community, and it makes it easier for people to work together.
- In the context of sexual trust, Riki Robbins describes four stages. These consist of perfect trust, damaged trust, devastated trust, and restored trust.
- In the context of information theory, Ed Gerck defines and contrasts trust with social functions such as power, surveillance, and accountability.
- From a social identity perspective, the propensity to trust strangers (see in-group favoritism) arises from the mutual knowledge of a shared group membership, stereotypes, or the need to maintain the group's positive distinctiveness.

Despite the centrality of trust to the positive functioning of people and relationships, very little is known about how and why trust evolves, is maintained, and is destroyed.

One factor that enhances trust among people is facial resemblance. Experimenters who digitally manipulated facial resemblance in a two-person sequential trust game found evidence that people have more trust in a partner who has similar facial features. Facial resemblance also decreased sexual desire for a partner. In a series of tests, digitally manipulated faces were presented to subjects who evaluated them for attractiveness within a long-term or short-term relationship. The results showed that within the context of a short-term relationship dependent on sexual desire, similar facial features caused a decrease in desire. Within the context of a long-term relationship, which is dependent on trust, similar facial features increased a person's attractiveness. This suggests that facial resemblance and trust have great effects on relationships.

Interpersonal trust literature investigates "trust-diagnostic situations": situations that test partners' abilities to act in the best interests of the other person or the relationship while rejecting a conflicting option which is merely in their self-interest. Trust-diagnostic situations occur throughout everyday life, though they can also be deliberately engineered by people who want to test the current level of trust in a relationship.

A low-trust relationship is one in which a person has little confidence their partner is truly concerned about them or the relationship. People in low trust relationships tend to make distress-maintaining attributions whereby they place their greatest focus on the consequences of their partner's negative behavior, and any impacts of positive actions are minimized. This feeds into the overarching notion that the person's partner is uninterested in the relationship, and any positive acts on their part are met with skepticism, leading to further negative outcomes.

Distrusting people may miss opportunities for trusting relationships. Someone subject to an abusive childhood may have been deprived of any evidence that trust is warranted in future relationships. An important key to treating sexual victimization of a child is the rebuilding of trust between parent and child. Failure by adults to validate that sexual abuse occurred contributes to the child's difficulty in trusting self and others. A child's trust can also be affected by the erosion of the marriage of their parents. Children of divorce do not exhibit less trust in mothers, partners, spouses, friends, and associates than their peers of intact families. The impact of parental divorce is limited to trust in the father.

People may trust non-human agents. For instance, people may trust animals, the scientific process, and social machines. Trust helps create a social contract that allows humans and domestic animals to live together. Trust in the scientific process is associated with increased trust in innovations such as biotechnology. When it comes to trust in social machines, people are more willing to trust intelligent machines with humanoid morphologies and female cues, when they are focused on tasks (versus socialization), and when they behave morally well. More generally, they may be trusted as a function of the "machine heuristic"—a mental shortcut with which people assume that machines are less biased, more accurate, and more reliable than people—such that people may sometimes trust a robot more than a person.

People are disposed to trust and to judge the trustworthiness of other people or groups—for instance, in developing relationships with potential mentors. One example would be as part of interprofessional work in the referral pathway from an emergency department to a hospital ward. Another would be building knowledge on whether new practices, people, and things introduced into our lives are indeed accountable or worthy of investing confidence and trust in. This process is captured by the empirically grounded construct of "Relational Integration" within Normalization Process Theory. This can be traced in neuroscience terms to the neurobiological structure and activity of a human brain. Some studies indicate that trust can be altered by the application of oxytocin.

=== Social identity approach ===
The social identity approach explains a person's trust in strangers as a function of their group-based stereotypes or in-group favoring behaviors which they base on salient group memberships. With regard to ingroup favoritism, people generally think well of strangers but expect better treatment from in-group members in comparison to out-group members. This greater expectation translates into a propensity to trust a member of the in-group more than a member of the out-group. It is only advantageous for one to form such expectations of an in-group stranger if the stranger also knows one's own group membership.

The social identity approach has been empirically investigated. Researchers have employed allocator studies to understand group-based trust in strangers. They may be operationalized as unilateral or bilateral relationships of exchange. General social categories such as university affiliation, course majors, and even ad-hoc groups have been used to distinguish between in-group and out-group members. In unilateral studies of trust, the participant is asked to choose between envelopes containing money that an in-group or out-group member previously allocated. Participants have no prior or future opportunities for interaction, thereby testing Brewer's notion that group membership is sufficient to bring about group-based trust and hence cooperation. Participants could expect an amount ranging from nothing to the maximum value an allocator could give out. Bilateral studies of trust have employed an investment game devised by Berg and colleagues in which people choose to give a portion or none of their money to another. Any amount given would be tripled and the receiver would then decide whether they would return the favor by giving money back to the sender. This was meant to test trusting behavior on the sender's part and the receiver's eventual trustworthiness.

Empirical research demonstrates that when group membership is salient to both parties, trust is granted more readily to in-group members than out-group members. This occurs even when the in-group's stereotype was comparatively less positive than the out-group's (e.g. psychology versus nursing majors), in the absence of personal identity cues, and when participants had the option of a sure sum of money (i.e. in essence opting out of the need to trust a stranger to gain some monetary reward). When only the recipient was made aware of group membership, trust becomes reliant upon group stereotypes. The group with the more positive stereotype was trusted (e.g. one's university affiliation over another's) even over that of the in-group (e.g. nursing over psychology majors).

Another explanation for in-group-favoring behaviors could be the need to maintain in-group positive distinctiveness, particularly in the presence of social identity threat. Trust in out-group strangers increased when personal cues to identity were revealed.

== Philosophy ==
Many philosophers have written about different forms of trust. Most agree that interpersonal trust is the foundation on which these forms can be modeled. For an act to be an expression of trust, it must not betray the expectations of the trustee. Some philosophers, such as Lagerspetz, argue that trust is a kind of reliance, though not merely reliance. Gambetta argued that trust is the inherent belief that others generally have good intentions, which is the foundation for our reliance on them. Philosophers such as Annette Baier challenged this view, asserting a difference between trust and reliance by saying that trust can be betrayed, whereas reliance can only be disappointed. Carolyn McLeod explains Baier's argument with the following examples: we can rely on our clock to give the time, but we do not feel betrayed when it breaks, thus, we cannot say that we trusted it; we are not trusting when we are suspicious of another person, because this is in fact an expression of distrust. The violation of trust warrants this sense of betrayal. Thus, trust is different from reliance in the sense that a trustor accepts the risk of being betrayed.

Karen Jones proposed an emotional aspect to trust—optimism that the trustee will do the right thing by the trustor, which is also described as "affective trust". People sometimes trust others even without this optimistic expectation, instead hoping that by extending trust this will prompt trustworthy behavior in the trustee. This is known as "therapeutic trust" and gives both the trustee a reason to be trustworthy, and the trustor a reason to believe they are trustworthy.

The definition of trust as a belief in something or a confident expectation about something eliminates the notion of risk because it does not include whether the expectation or belief is favorable or unfavorable. For example, to expect a friend to arrive to dinner late because she has habitually arrived late for the last fifteen years is a confident expectation (whether or not we find her late arrivals to be annoying). The trust is not about what we wish for, but rather it is in the consistency of the data. As a result, there is no risk or sense of betrayal because the data exists as collective knowledge. Faulkner contrasts such "predictive trust" with the aforementioned affective trust, proposing that predictive trust may only warrant disappointment as a consequence of an inaccurate prediction, not a sense of betrayal.

== Economics ==
Trust in economics explains the difference between actual human behavior and behavior that could be explained by people's desire to maximize utility. In economic terms, trust can explain a difference between Nash equilibrium and the observed equilibrium. Such an approach can be applied to individual people as well as to societies.

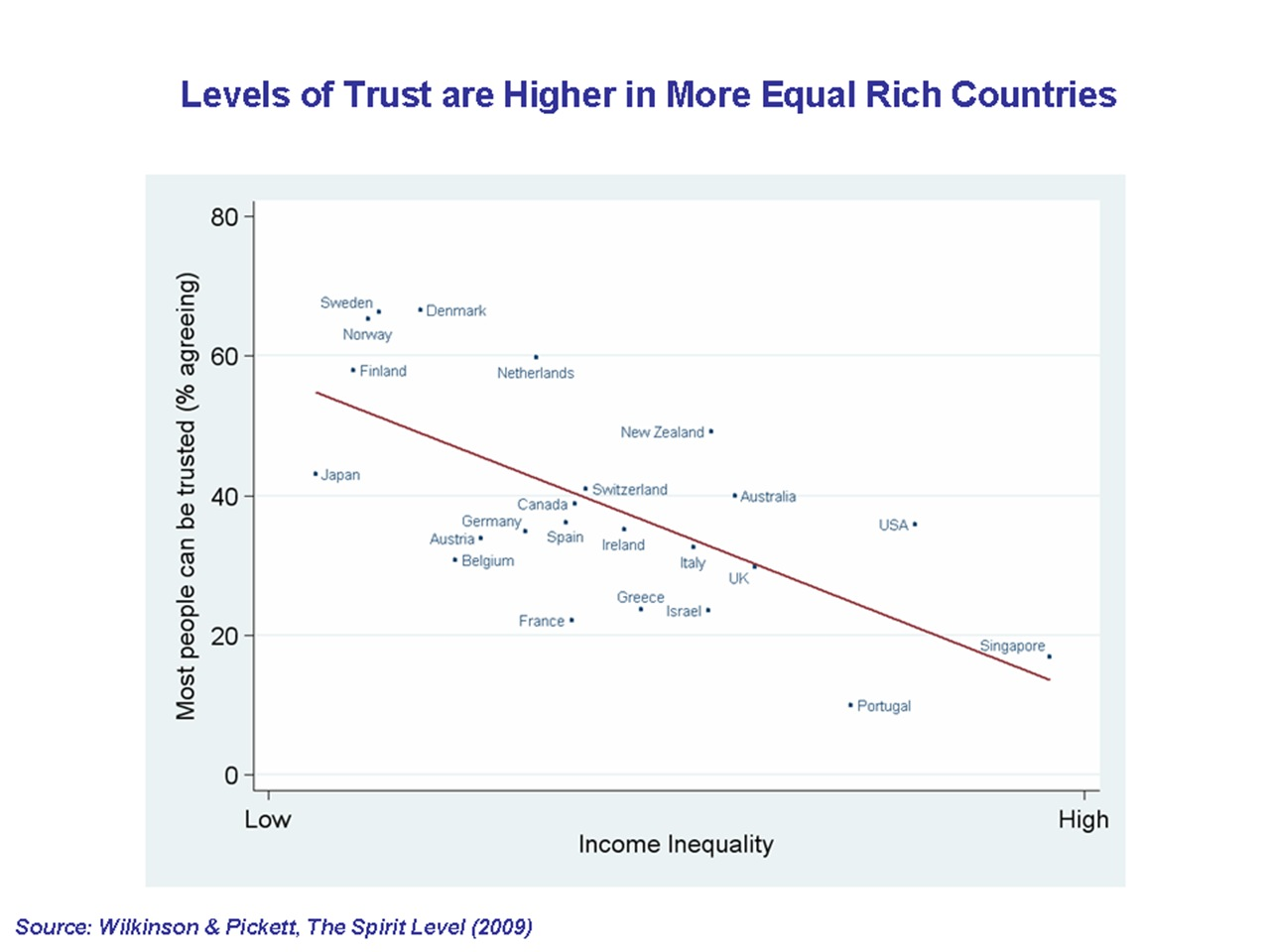
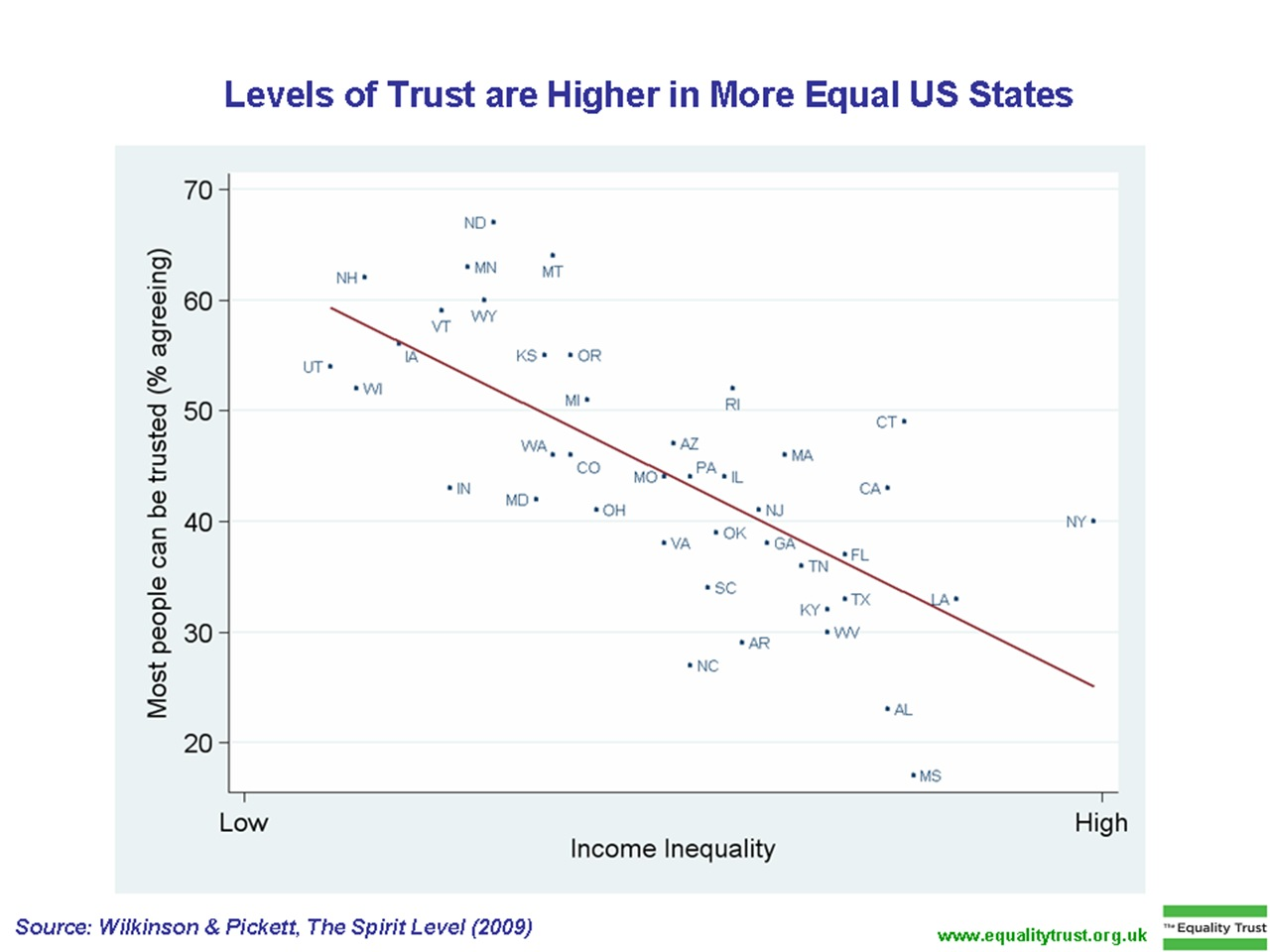
Levels of trust are higher in countries, and in states of the U.S.A., that are more economically equal.

Trust is important to economists for many reasons. Taking the "Market for Lemons" transaction popularized by George Akerlof as an example, if a potential buyer of a car does not trust the seller not to sell a lemon, the transaction will not take place. The buyer will not buy without trust, even if the product would be of great value to the buyer. Trust can act as an economic lubricant, reducing the cost of transactions between parties, enabling new forms of cooperation, and generally furthering business activities, employment, and prosperity. This observation prompted interest in trust as a form of social capital and research into the process of creation and distribution of such capital. A higher level of social trust may be positively correlated with economic development: Even though the original concept of "high trust" and "low trust" societies may not necessarily hold, social trust benefits the economy and a low level of trust inhibits economic growth. The absence of trust restricts growth in employment, wages, and profits, thus reducing the overall welfare of society. The World Economic Forums of 2022 and 2024 both adopted the rebuilding of trust as their themes.

Theoretical economical modelling demonstrates that the optimum level of trust that a rational economic agent should exhibit in transactions is equal to the trustworthiness of the other party. Such a level of trust leads to an efficient market. Trusting less leads to losing economic opportunities, while trusting more leads to unnecessary vulnerabilities and potential exploitation. Economics is also interested in quantifying trust, usually in monetary terms. The level of correlation between an increase in profit margin and a decrease in transactional costs can be used as an indicator of the economic value of trust.

Economic "trust games" empirically quantify trust in relationships under laboratory conditions. Several games and game-like scenarios related to trust have been tried, with certain preferences to those that allow the estimation of confidence in monetary terms. In games of trust the Nash equilibrium differs from Pareto optimum so that no player alone can maximize their own utility by altering their selfish strategy without cooperation. Cooperating partners can also benefit. The classical version of the game of trust has been described as an abstract investment game, using the scenario of an investor and a broker. The investor can invest some fraction of his money, and the broker can return to the investor some fraction of the investor's gains. If both players follow their naive economic best interest, the investor should never invest, and the broker will never be able to repay anything. Thus the flow of money, its volume, and its character is attributable entirely to the existence of trust. Such a game can be played as a once-off, or repeatedly with the same or different sets of players to distinguish between a general propensity to trust and trust within particular relationships. Several variants of this game exist. Reversing rules leads to the game of distrust, pre-declarations can be used to establish intentions of players, while alterations to the distribution of gains can be used to manipulate the perceptions of both players. The game can be played by several players on the closed market, with or without information about reputation.

Other interesting games include binary-choice trust games and the gift-exchange game. Games based on the Prisoner's Dilemma link trust with economic utility and demonstrate the rationality behind reciprocity.

The popularization of e-commerce led to new challenges related to trust within the digital economy and the desire to understand buyers' and sellers' decisions to trust one another. For example, interpersonal relationships between buyers and sellers have been disintermediated by the technology, and consequentially they required improvement. Websites can influence the buyer to trust the seller, regardless of the seller's actual trustworthiness. Reputation-based systems can improve trust assessment by capturing a collective perception of trustworthiness; this has generated interest in various models of reputation.

== Management and organization science ==
In management and organization science, trust is studied as a factor which organizational actors can manage and influence. Scholars have researched how trust develops across individual and organizational levels of analysis. They suggest a reciprocal process in which organizational structures influence people's trust and, at the same time, people's trust manifests in organizational structures. Trust, sometimes referred to as trust capital, is also one of the conditions of an organizational culture that supports knowledge sharing. An organizational culture that supports knowledge sharing allows employees to feel secure and comfortable to share their knowledge, their work, and their expertise. Structure often creates trust in a person, and this encourages them to feel comfortable and excel in the workplace; it makes an otherwise stressful environment manageable.

Management and organization science scholars have also studied how trust is influenced by contracts and how trust interacts with formal mechanisms. Scholars in management and related disciplines have also made a case for the importance of distrust as a related but distinct construct. Similarly scholars have assessed the relationship between monitoring and trust, for example in a trust game context, and in shareholder-management relations.

Since the mid-1990s, organizational research has followed two distinct but nonexclusive paradigms of trust research:

1. The first distinguishes between two major dimensions of trust: Trust in another can be characterized as cognition-based trust (based on rational calculation) and affect-based trust (based on emotional attachment). For example, trust in an auto repair shop could come in the form of an assessment of the capabilities of the shop to do a good job repairing one's car (cognition-based trust) or of having a longstanding relationship with the shop's owner (affect-based trust).
2. The second distinguishes between the trustworthiness factors that give rise to trust (i.e., one's perceived ability, benevolence, and integrity) and trust itself.

Together, these paradigms predict how different dimensions of trust form in organizations by demonstrating various trustworthiness attributes.

== Systems ==
Beyond interpersonal trust among leaders, system trust, a background confidence in the international order rooted in the idea of states acting as coherent state persons, underpins diplomacy and diplomatic stability. In systems, a trusted component has a set of properties that another component can rely on. If A trusts B, a violation in B's properties might compromise A's correct operation. Observe that those properties of B trusted by A might not correspond quantitatively or qualitatively to B's actual properties. This occurs when the designer of the overall system does not consider the relation. Consequently, trust should be placed to the extent of the component's trustworthiness. The trustworthiness of a component is thus, not surprisingly, defined by how well it secures a set of functional and non-functional properties, deriving from its architecture, construction, and environment, and evaluated as appropriate.

== Other ==
Holding trust in a democratic political system is known as political efficacy.

== See also ==
- Anticipation
- Attachment theory
- Credulity
- Crime statistics
- Gullibility
- Intimacy
- Leap of faith
- Misplaced trust
- Personal boundaries
- Position of trust
- Source criticism
- Swift trust theory
- Trust metric
- Trusted system
- Trust in computing
