= Professional abuse =

Abuse in professional settings

Professional abuse is "a pattern of conduct in which a person abuses, violates, or takes advantage of a victim within the context of the abuser's profession." This typically involves a violation of the relevant professional organization's code of ethics. Organizational ethics or standards of behavior require the maintenance of professional boundaries and the treatment of people with respect and dignity.

Professional abuse involves those working in a facility were patients/clients are abused due to their vulnerability relying on professionals for assistance.

They are taken advantage of because of this leaving them treated unethically. This type of abuse is not noticed as much as other abuse because of the trust that these patients think they have for the abuser and the manipulation antics used upon them.

== Settings and context in which it occurs ==
These types of situations tend to happen in hospitals, nursing homes, rehabilitation centers, schools and many more health-related facilities. It's not just limited to these facilities; however, it could also take place in offices that deal heavily with patients.

== Forms of abuse ==
There are many forms of abuse: discriminatory, financial, physical, psychological, and sexual.

Professional abuse always involves: betrayal, exploitation, and violation of professional boundaries.

Professionals can abuse in three ways:

- nonfeasance - ignore and take no indicated action - neglect.
- misfeasance - take inappropriate action or give intentionally incorrect advice.
- malfeasance - hostile, aggressive action taken to injure the client's interests.

== Factors contributing to professional abuse ==
In a working environment, the abuse of power against staff can manifest in various harmful ways. Often, abuse originates from an individual who holds power (i.e. the boss, executive or managers), but as the examples below demonstrate, abuse can also come from someone in a less powerful position.

=== Healthcare settings ===
There are numerous risk factors impacting both perpetrators and professionals who fall victim to assaults. In the context of healthcare settings, healthcare workers are more vulnerable to violence due in large part to the conditions under which care and services are provided. Extensive research conducted identifies that one critical aspect contributing to this heightened vulnerability is the nature of interactions between healthcare workers, patients, friends or visitors. These individuals often find themselves emotionally charged, grappling with complex health issues, uncertainties and high expectations regarding the care and outcomes for their loved ones. This emotional intensity, combined with the perception of healthcare workers as authority figures responsible for the well-being of patients, can contribute to feelings of powerlessness or frustration among individuals receiving care. In some cases, this sense of powerlessness may manifest as aggression or violence towards healthcare.

Furthermore, the likelihood of violence is further increased by structural and environmental variables like crowded facilities, long wait times, strict visiting restrictions, a lack of information, and linguistic and cultural disparities.

In relation to healthcare workers themselves, they may be faced with shortage of staff, inexperienced staff, or a lack of training. Short-staffing not only places a heavier workload on existing personnel but also increases stress levels and reduces the ability of staff to effectively manage patient interactions. As a result, healthcare workers may find themselves stretched thin, forced to juggle multiple responsibilities simultaneously, and unable to provide the level of care and attention they desire. Moreover, the composition of healthcare teams may also play a role in increasing susceptibility to violence. Inexperienced or newly hired staff members, for instance, may lack the confidence, skills, and familiarity with institutional protocols necessary to navigate challenging situations effectively. This lack of experience can leave them feeling ill-equipped to handle confrontations or de-escalate tense interactions with patients or their families, potentially exacerbating conflicts and increasing the risk of violence.

=== Workplace abuse ===
The culture and structure within an organization are critical factors in determining whether the workplace is supportive or hostile. According to Perez Moroz and Brian Kleiner, where there exists a competitive organizational structure, power dynamics often favour a select few individuals who wield authority and influence. This power dynamic can lead to the emergence of abusive behaviours within the organization as those in positions of authority may misuse their power to assert control or dominance over others. The objective of those in positions of power is to secure personal comfort and well-being. Consequently, to achieve this comfort, individuals commonly referred to as management, misuse their authority as a means to accomplish tasks. Bassman and London (1993) highlight the absence of standardized guidelines for handling mistreated subordinates by supervisors/managers in numerous organizations. The imperative to maintain their positions within an organization may drive these managers to mistreat their subordinates.

However, managerial abuse may not solely arise from the fear of losing power but could also be influenced by personality disorders, job stress, and learned patterns of aggression. Such managers may engage in nepotism by promoting undeserving subordinates while leveraging company resources for personal gain. A manager displaying abusive tendencies might possess significant self-assurance and managerial skills to mask this unethical behaviour. Furthermore, the gratification derived from abuse may stem from a sense of control and superiority.

== Impact on victims and communities ==
The impact of workplace abuse, particularly by supervisors or managers, extends beyond individual victims to affect the broader community and organizational culture. Gary Powell (1998) describes an abusive organization as displaying little regard for its employees' well-being, creating an environment where concerns for human needs are disregarded. In such settings, workplace trauma is pervasive, leading to significant emotional and psychological distress among employees. Employees subjected to this emotional abuse, scrutiny, and intrusive surveillance experience diminished job performance and self-worth, while facing increased levels of stress and anxiety. This reduces the overall productivity of the workforce. According to studies, employees who experience abusive supervision have greater turnover rates, less favourable job attitudes, and increased conflict between work and family life among employees. Workplace abuse also perpetuates a cycle of dysfunction, contributing to communication breakdowns, reduced performance, and increased absenteeism.

== Solutions ==
There are several strategies available to organizations seeking to address professional abuse. A study, for instance, revealed that this problem often arises when there is an extreme power imbalance between the professional and the victim. A framework based on different grades of client empowerment and ways of strengthening it can help solve the problem. Those who have been subjected to professional abuse could also pursue any of the following courses of actions: lodging a complaint; reporting abuse to the police; and, taking legal action. There are also organizations that can help those who are victimized learn more about their rights and the options available to them.

An alternative to the solutions posed above is developing a plan of 'zero tolerance' which deals with any type or form of discrimination and workplace abuse. This policy would entail the establishment of clear guidelines aimed at addressing any instances or form of discrimination and abuse within the workplace.

Education and training initiatives can also be deemed beneficial for addressing workplace abuse effectively. These programs would involve both managers and employees, being educated about acceptable conduct and behaviour in the workplace. For managers, such initiatives provide insights into recognizing the signs of abuse, understanding the impact it can have on individuals and the organization, and learning effective strategies for prevention and intervention. Similarly, education and training initiatives help employees understand their obligations, rights, and methods for reporting abuse.

== See also ==
- Abuse of power
- Institutional abuse
- Patient abuse
- Professional conduct
- Professional negligence in English Law
- Professional responsibility
