= Saint-Domingue Creoles =

Ethnic group native to Saint-Domingue

Saint-Domingue Creoles Créoles de Saint-Domingue

Regions with significant populations
- Saint-Domingue, Louisiana, France, United States, Haiti, Cuba, Puerto Rico, New York, Dominican Republic, Jamaica

Languages
- French, Creole French, Spanish, Portuguese, English, Haitian Creole

Religion
- Roman Catholic, Voodoo, Islam, Protestant

Related ethnic groups
- Haitians, Cajuns, Louisiana Creoles, French Louisianians, Acadians, Dominicans, Puerto Ricans

Saint-Domingue Creoles (French: Créoles de Saint-Domingue, Haitian Creole: Moun Kreyòl Sen Domeng) or simply Creoles, were the people who lived in the French colony of Saint-Domingue prior to the Haitian Revolution.

These Creoles formed an ethnic group native to Saint-Domingue and were all born in Saint-Domingue. The Creoles were well educated, and they created much art, such as the famed French Opera; their society prized manners, good education, tradition, and honor. During and after the Haitian Revolution, most Creoles from Saint-Domingue fled to locations in the United States, other Antilles islands, Cuba, France, Jamaica, and especially New Orleans in Louisiana, where they made an enormous impact on Louisiana Creole culture.

== Saint-Domingue Creole Society ==
=== Etymology ===
The word creole comes from the Portuguese term crioulo, which means "a person raised in one's house" and from the Latin creare, which means "to create, make, bring forth, produce, beget". In the New World, the term originally referred to Europeans born and raised in overseas colonies (as opposed to the European-born peninsulares).

=== Origin of the Saint-Domingue Creoles ===
French adventurers settled on Tortuga Island, which was close to the Spanish colony of Santo Domingo. As a result, in the late 17th century, the French had de facto control of the island close to the Spanish colony. The wars of Louis XIV in Europe finally convinced the Spaniards to give the western quarter of the island to the French under to the Treaty on Ryswick (1697). The French called their new colony Saint-Domingue. As the colony developed, a planter class emerged that created highly profitable plantations- these plantations generated so much wealth that Saint-Domingue soon became the richest colony in the world.

In the late 17th century, French colonists made up more than 90% of the population in Saint-Domingue. However, as demand for sugar in Europe grew, planters imported African slaves to meet the demand. The population of Africans grew quickly, and sexual exploitation of enslaved African women by many French settlers contributed to the emergence of a multiracial Creole population, resulting in the growth of a multiracial Creole population. By the early 18th century, Creoles and Africans came to compose the majority of the colony.

Throughout the 17th century, French Creoles became established in the Americas as a unique ethnicity originating from the mix of French, Indian, and African cultures. These French Creoles held a distinct ethno-cultural identity, a shared antique language, the Creole French language, and their civilization owed its existence to the overseas expansion of the French Empire. Martinique for a time was the center of French Creoles in the Caribbean; its decline lead to Saint-Domingue becoming the capital of the West Indian Creole civilization.

=== Saint-Domingue Creole society ===
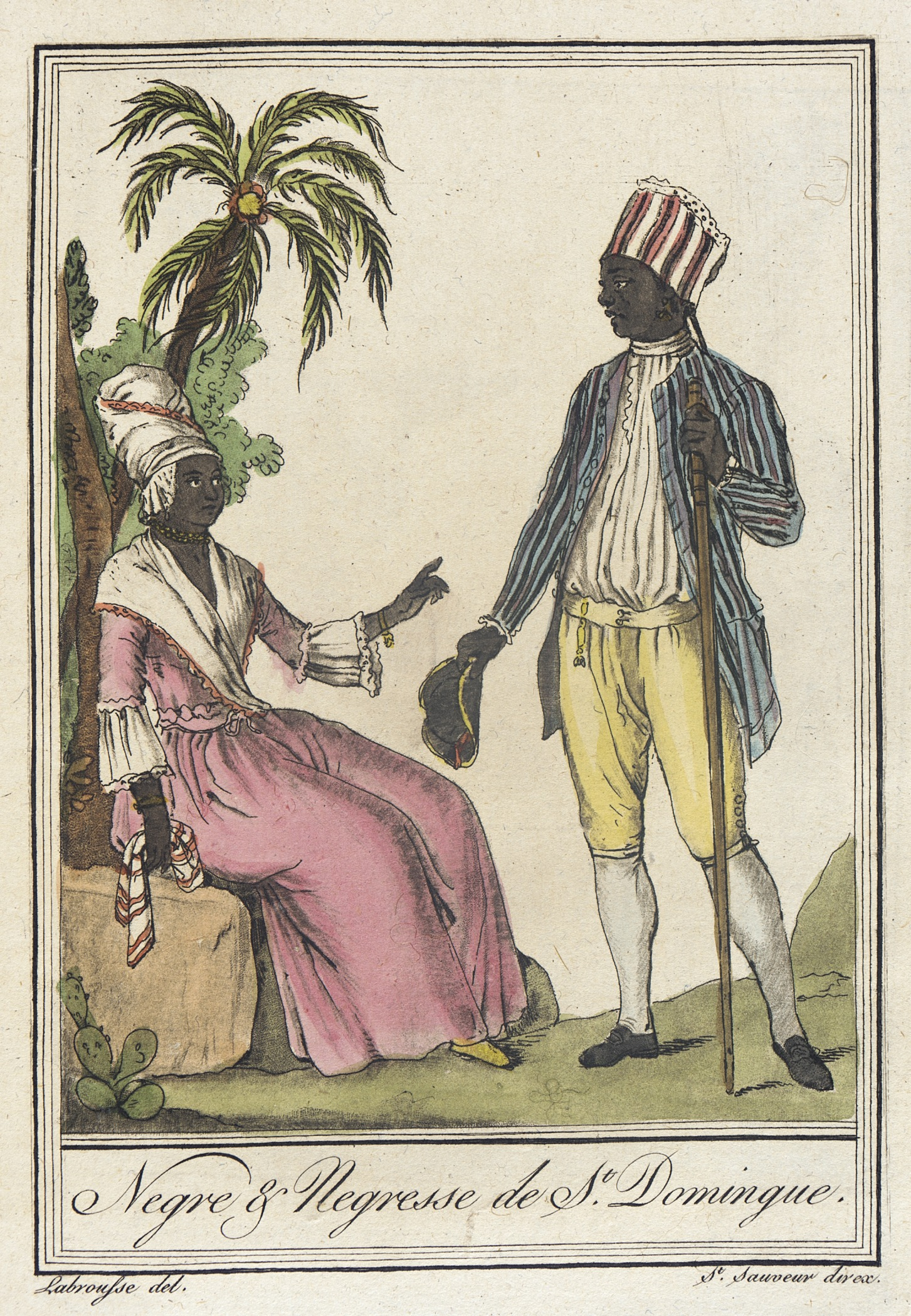
A rich Creole planter and his wife

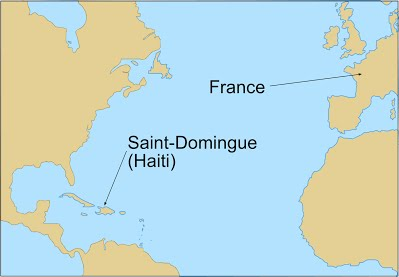
A picture depicting the distance between Saint-Domingue and France

Saint-Domingue had the largest and wealthiest free population of color in the Caribbean who were known as the Gens de couleur libres (free people of color). Population estimations in 1789 indicate that there were 28,000 to 32,000 affranchis and Creoles of color; 40,000 to 45,000 whites which included its largest group being the Petits blancs (white commoners; lit: little whites) and Creoles of lighter complexions; French subjects: engagés (white indentured servants), foreign European immigrants or refugees, and a small exclusive group of Grands blancs (white nobles; lit: big whites) of whom the majority lived or were born in France; lastly, a slave population which totaled to be between 406,000 and 465,000. While many of the Gens de couleur libres were affranchis (ex-slaves), most members of this class were Creoles of color, i.e. free born blacks and mulattoes. As in New Orleans, a system of plaçage developed, in which white men had a kind of common-law marriage with slave or free mistresses, and provided for them with a dowry, sometimes freedom, and often education or apprenticeships for their children. Some such descendants of planters inherited considerable property.

While the French controlled Saint-Domingue, they maintained a class system which covered both whites and free people of color. These classes divided up roles on the island and established a hierarchy. The highest class, known as the Grands blancs, was composed of rich nobles, including royalty, and mainly lived in France. These individuals held most of the power and controlled much of the property on Saint-Domingue. Although their group was very small and exclusive, they were quite powerful.

Below the Grands blancs were the Petits blancs (white commoners) and the gens de couleur libres (free people of color). These classes inhabited Saint-Domingue and held a lot of local political power and control of the militia. Petits blancs shared the same societal level as gens de couleur libres.

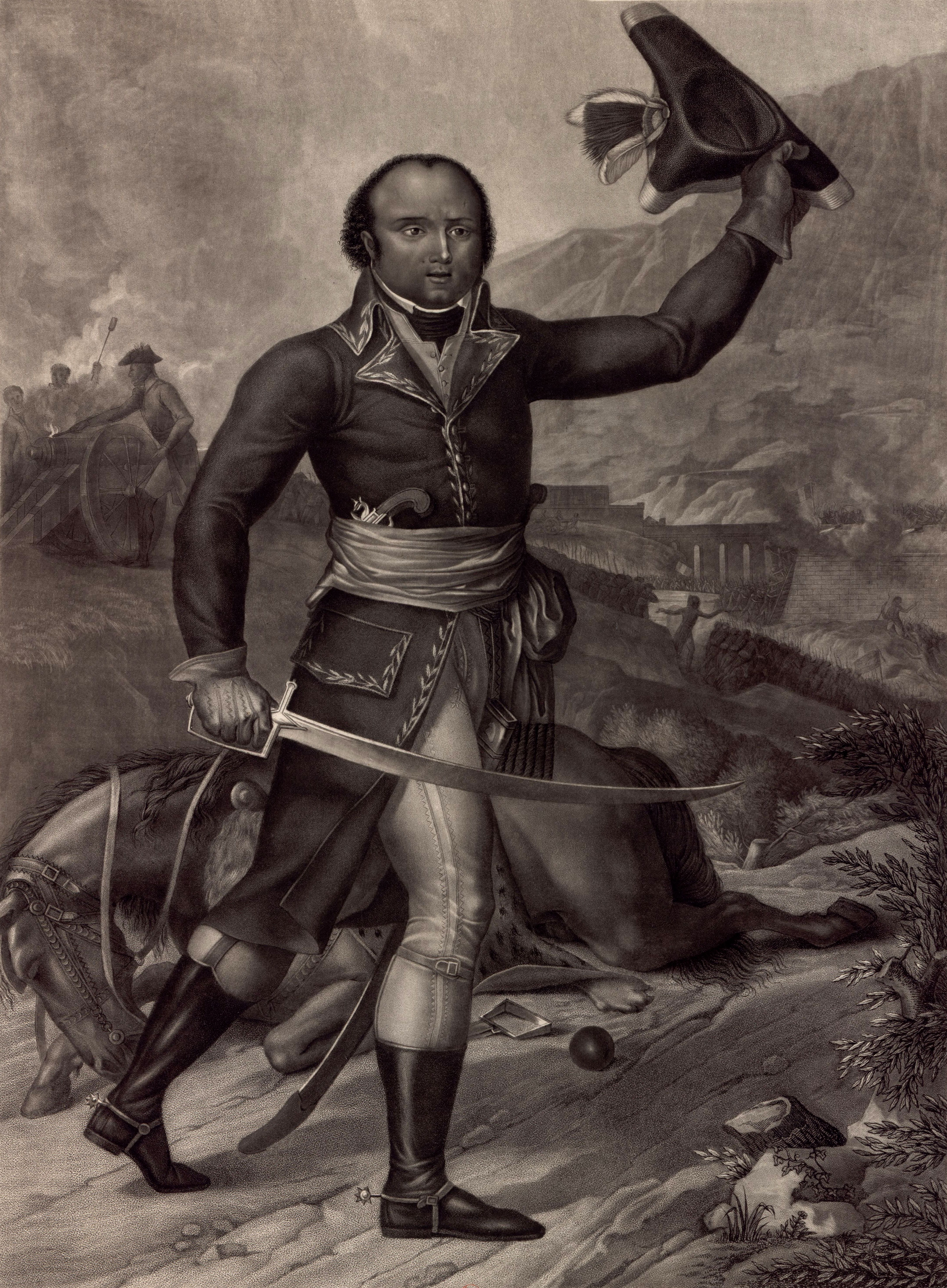
Thomas-Alexandre Dumas, a Creole general in the French Army.

"These men are beginning to fill the colony... their numbers continually increasing amongst the whites, with fortunes often greater than those of the whites... Their strict frugality prompting them to place their profits in the bank every year, they accumulate huge capital sums and become arrogant because they are rich, and their arrogance increases in proportion to their wealth. They bid on properties that are for sale in every district and cause their prices to reach such astronomical heights that the whites who have not so much wealth are unable to buy, or else ruin themselves if they do persist. In this manner, in many districts the best land is owned by Creoles of color."

The Gens de couleur libres class was made up of affranchis (ex-slaves), free-born blacks, and mixed-race people, and they controlled much wealth and land in the same way as Petits blancs; they held full citizenship and civil equality with other French subjects. Race was initially tied to culture and class, and some "white" Creoles had non-white ancestry.

=== Development of Creole culture ===
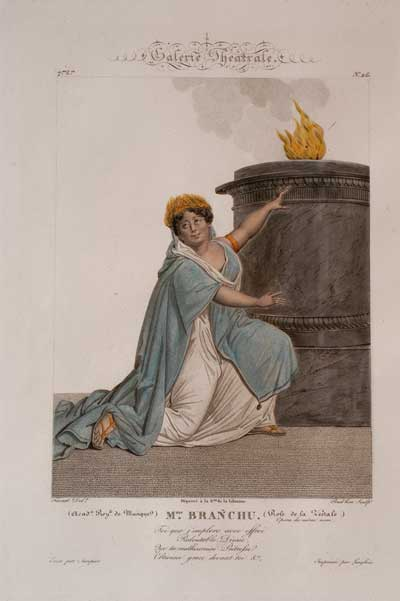
A Creole soprano Caroline Branchu

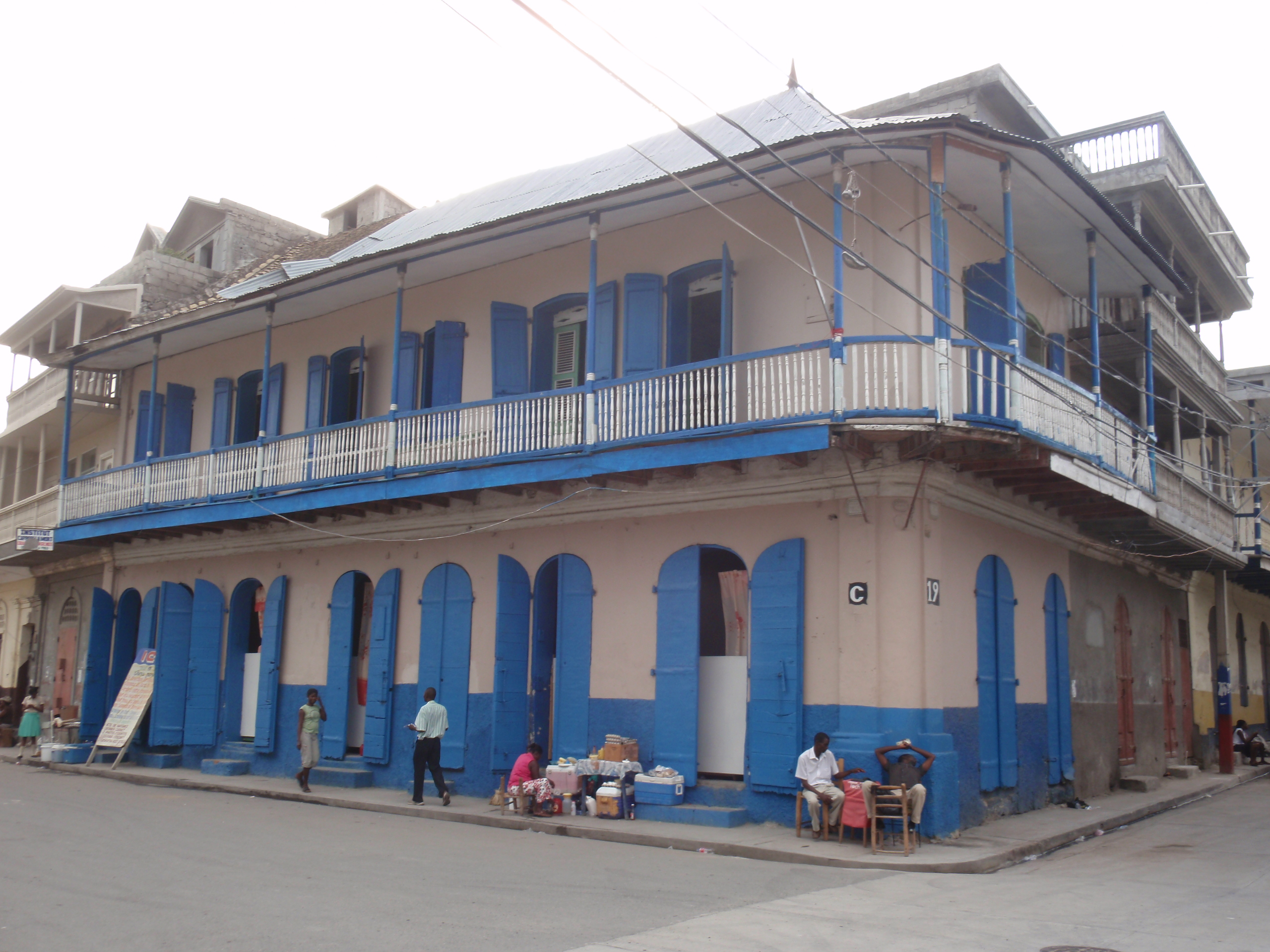
Creole architecture in Cap-Haïtien, previously Cap-Français

Saint-Domingue underwent a cultural awakening in the years after the French and Indian War, where France lost all of its continental New France territory (French Louisiana, French Canada, and Acadia). Imperial French policy makers worried that future conflicts could test the loyalty of their Creole subjects, and as Saint-Domingue was the richest colony in the world, they couldn't afford to lose it. The Bourbon Regime thus expanded the colonial bureaucracy, hired administrative personnel, built new infrastructure, and started a colonial mail service as well as a Creole printing press. Creole entrepreneurs also added to the colony's development by building cafés and clubs.

The urban society of Saint-Domingue became rich and thrived. The French Opera was one of the most cherished arts in Saint-Domingue. Eight towns in Saint-Domingue had theaters, the largest being in the capital of Cap-Français that could hold 1,500 spectators. There were also Masonic lodges, and many universities espousing French Enlightenment ideas. Saint-Domingue was home to the Cercle des Philadelphes, a scientific organization of which the American scientist Benjamin Franklin was a member.

Saint-Domingue developed a highly specialized and differentiated economy, and art and entertainment were abundant on the island. Public festivals such as masquerade balls, the celebration of feasts & holidays, and charivaris became ingrained in the culture of Saint-Domingue. A transient population also became present in its society, and tourists from different cultures and classes would stream to the major city-centers of the island, such as Cap-Français and Port-au-Prince.

By 1789, the society in Saint-Domingue was already older and much refined, with its own customs, traditions, and values. The core of Saint-Domingue Creole civilization was transferred to New Orleans, Louisiana after the Haitian Revolution.

=== Freedoms of the Creoles and Affranchis ===
In 1685, French administrators published a slave code based on Roman laws, the Code Noir. Discipline, the colonial government, rural police, and the ability for social promotion prevented slave uprisings in Saint-Domingue; in the British colonies such as Jamaica, a dozen large slave rebellions occurred in the 18th century alone. Saint-Domingue never had a slave rebellion until the beginning of the Haitian Revolution.

The Code Noir based on Roman laws also conferred affranchis (ex-slaves) full citizenship and gave complete civil equality with other French subjects. Saint-Domingue's Code Noir never outlawed interracial marriage, nor did it limit the amount of property a free person could give to affranchis. Creoles of color and affranchis used the colonial courts to protect their property and sue whites in the colony.

During the 18th century, Saint-Domingue became home to the largest and wealthiest free population of African descent anywhere in the Americas. The existence of wealthy families of African descent challenged the ideas from which the plantation society emerged. For much of the 18th century, colonists used social class rather than genealogy to define position in Saint-Domingue society.

Saint-Domingue census records show that families of African ancestry who owned property, were educated, and were legitimately married were listed as White Creoles by officials; racial identities were tied to wealth and culture rather than ancestry.

=== Slavery in Saint-Domingue ===
Planters slowly integrated slaves into their plantation's labor system. On each plantation there was a black commander who supervised the other slaves on behalf of the planter, and the planter made sure not to favor one African ethnic group over the others.

Most slaves who came to Saint-Domingue worked in fields or shops; the youngest slaves often became household servants, while the oldest slaves were employed as surveillants. Some slaves became skilled workmen, and they received privileges such as better food, the ability to go into town, and partake in liberté des savanes (savannah liberty), a sort of freedom with certain rules. Slaves were considered to be valuable property, and slaves were attended by doctors who gave medical care when they were sick.

A description of how the liberté des savanes Creole custom worked:

"My parent, like most Creoles, was an indulgent master, and more under the influence of his bondservants than he himself was aware of. A number of servants belonged to him, who either hired themselves in the capital or on estates, or became fishermen, chip-chip finders, or land-crab catchers. These people gave my father what they pleased out of their earnings; he scarcely took any account of what his slaves paid him: sufficient for him was it, that one part of them supplied him with enough to satisfy his immediate wants. The rest waited on him, or waited on each other, or, most properly speaking, waited for each other to work.

Thirteen adult slaves and three boys lived in his house: their united labour might have been performed by two or three paid domestics. Their time was chiefly spent in eating wangoo (boiled Indian cornflour), fish, land-crabs, and yams; sleeping; beating the African drum, composed of a barrel covered with a goat's skin; dancing, quarrelling, and love-making after their own peculiar amusement.

If a fine chicken-turtle, a large grouper, or delicious rock-hynd was caught by any of our fishermen, no price would tempt them to sell it; no, it must be sent or brought as a present to the master;... if my father received little money from his slaves, he wanted little, and fared sumptuously in consequence to the presents he received, and these were always given to him with pride."

=== African presence in Saint-Domingue ===
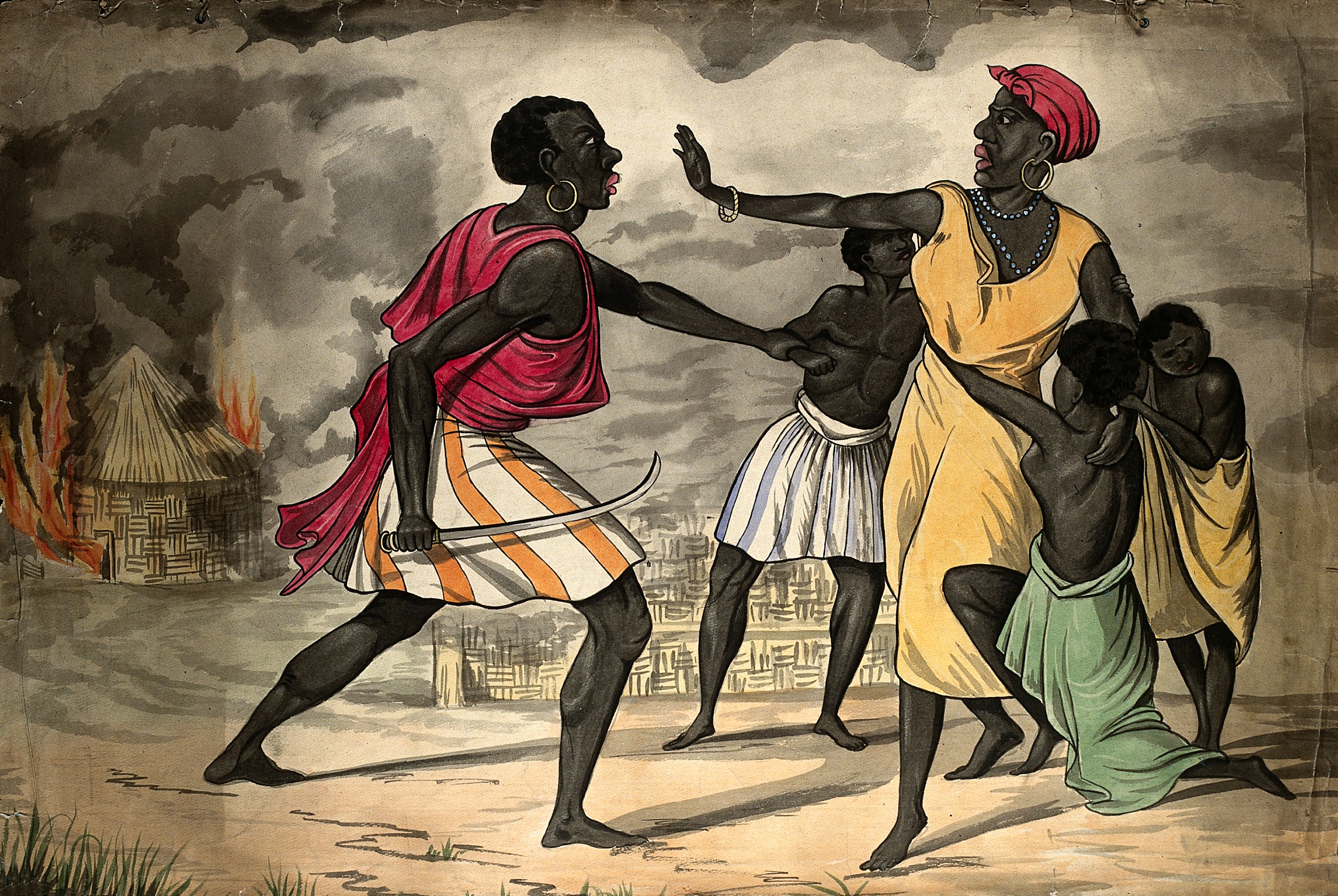
An African slaver capturing slaves for sale

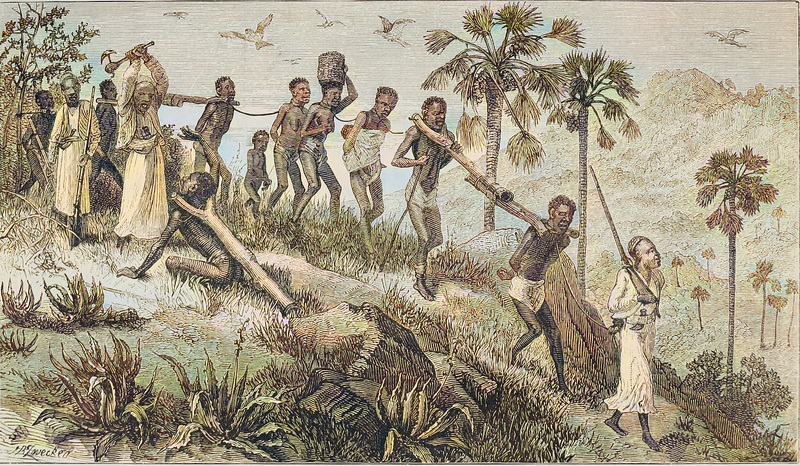
African slave traders

The vast majority of the slaves in Saint-Domingue were war-captives who had lost a war with another ethnic group. Most slaves came from ethnic tension between different tribes and kingdoms, or religious wars between pagans and Muslim-pagan inter-religious wars.

R. Hé! hé! mô n'a pas pense ça, moi, qui mô va faire dans mo paye? mô n'a pas saclave?

Q. Ah! bin; quand vous arrive dans vous paye, vous n'a pas libe donc?

R. Non va; mô saclave la guerre; quand mô arrive là; zotte prend moi encore pour vendé moi. Quand mô fini mort, mô va allé dans mon paye, à v'là tout.

R. Hey! Hey! I don't think so, what am I going to do in my country? I won't be a slave?

Q. Ah! well; when you you arrive in your country, you won't be free then?

R. Not at all; i'm a slave of war; when I arrive there, they will take me again and sell me. When I die, I will go to my country, that's all.

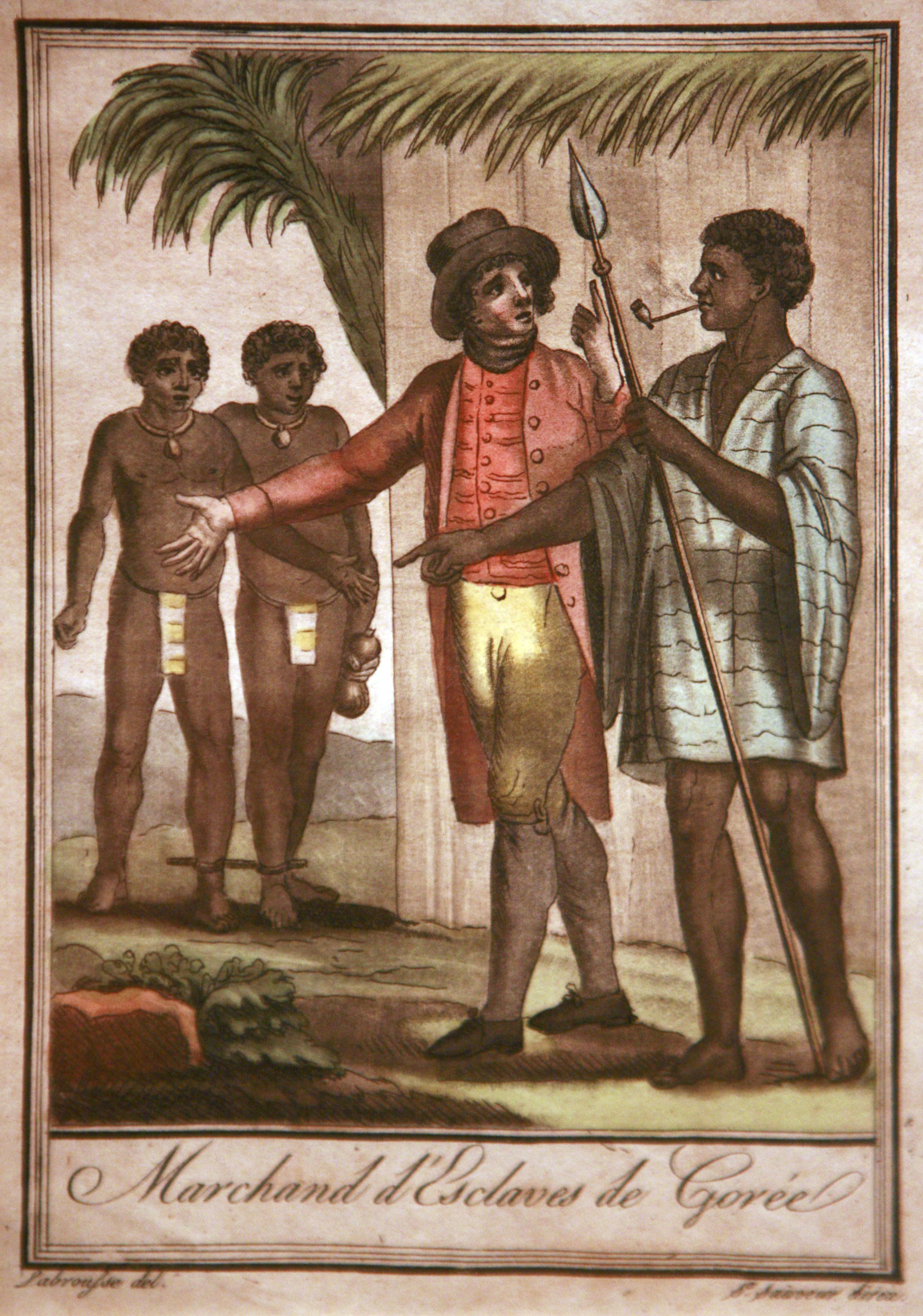
An African slave trader sells two slaves to a European

As African freedmen had full citizenship and civil equality with other French subjects, they took an interest in expanding the studies of each of their unique people's history. Africans contributed to the spiritual and mythological aspects of Saint-Domingue through their folklore, such as the widespread tales of Compère Lapin and Compère Bouqui.

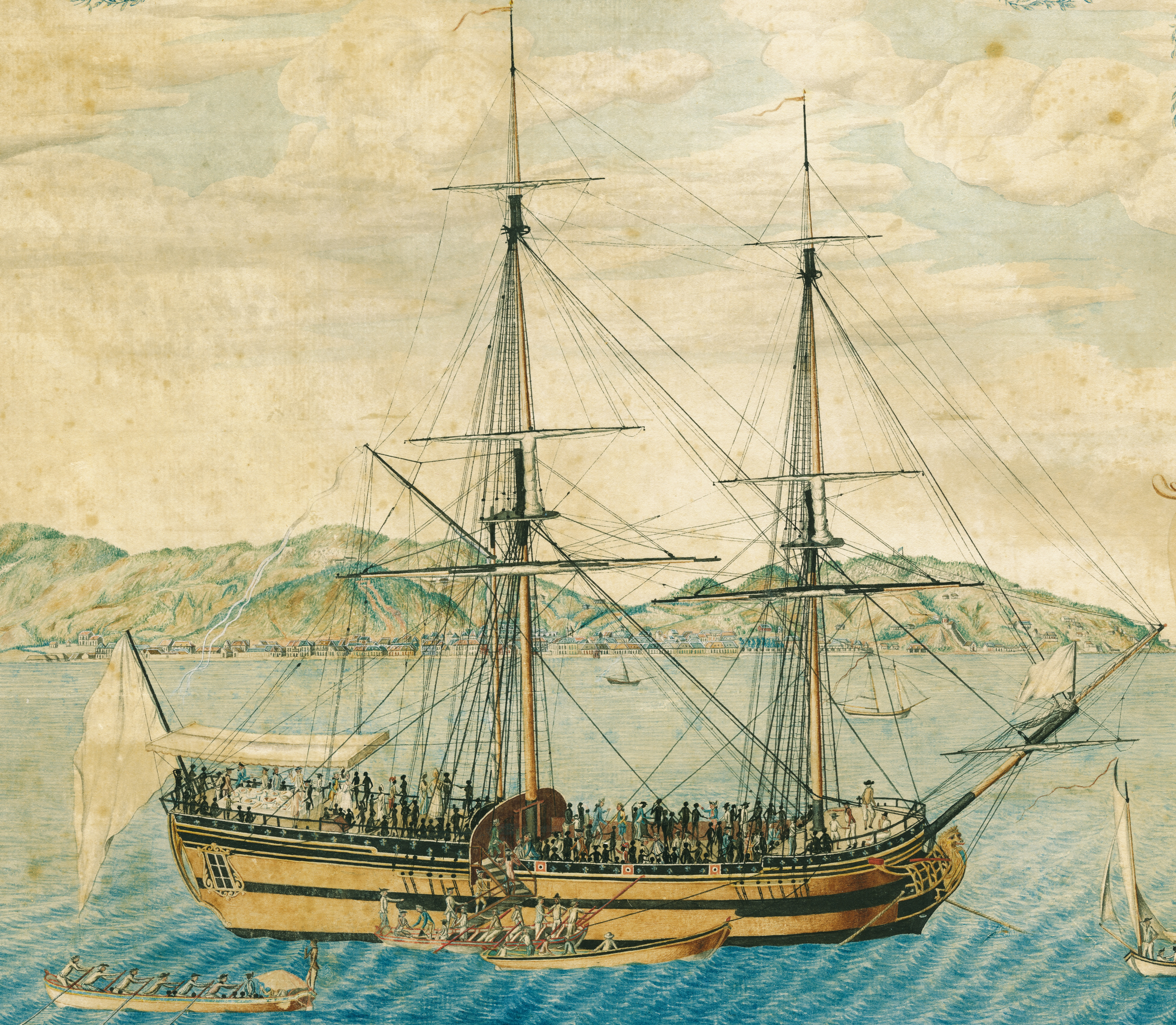
A slave ship arriving at Cap-Français, Saint-Domingue

Below is a list of different African peoples found in Saint-Domingue:

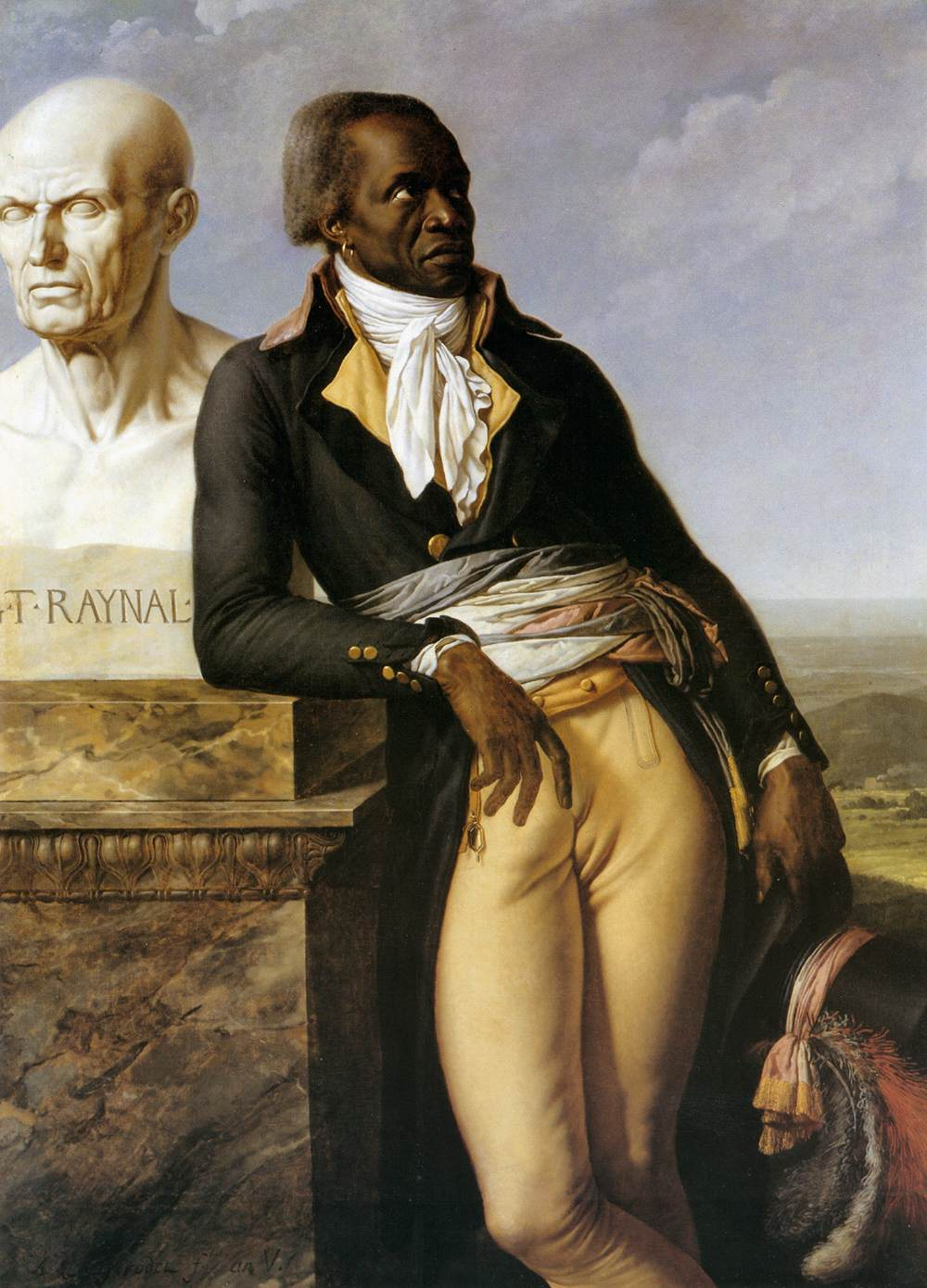
Jean-Baptiste Belley, an affranchi who became a rich planter, elected member of the Estates General for Saint-Domingue, and later Deputy of the French National Convention

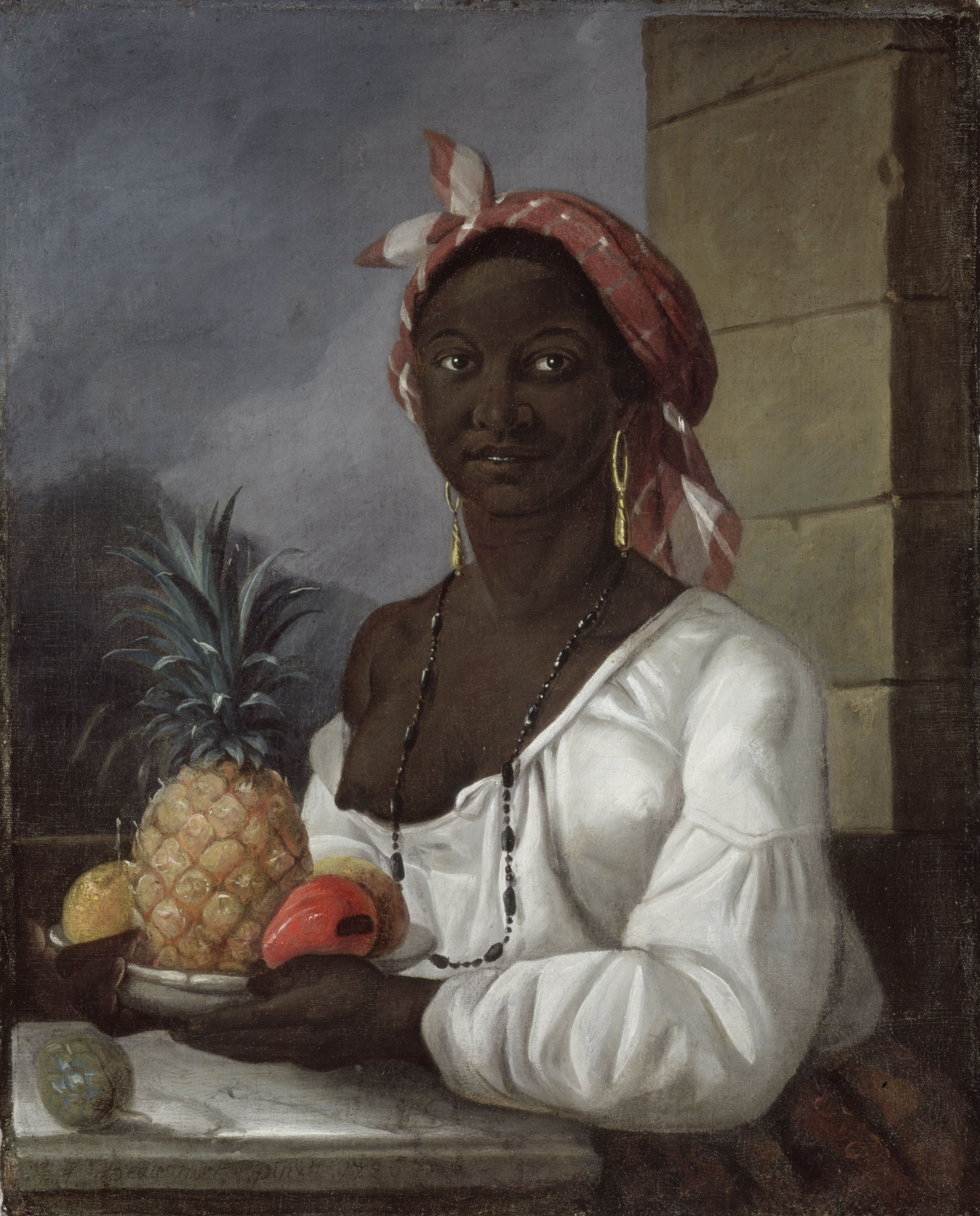
Portrait of a Haitian slave woman

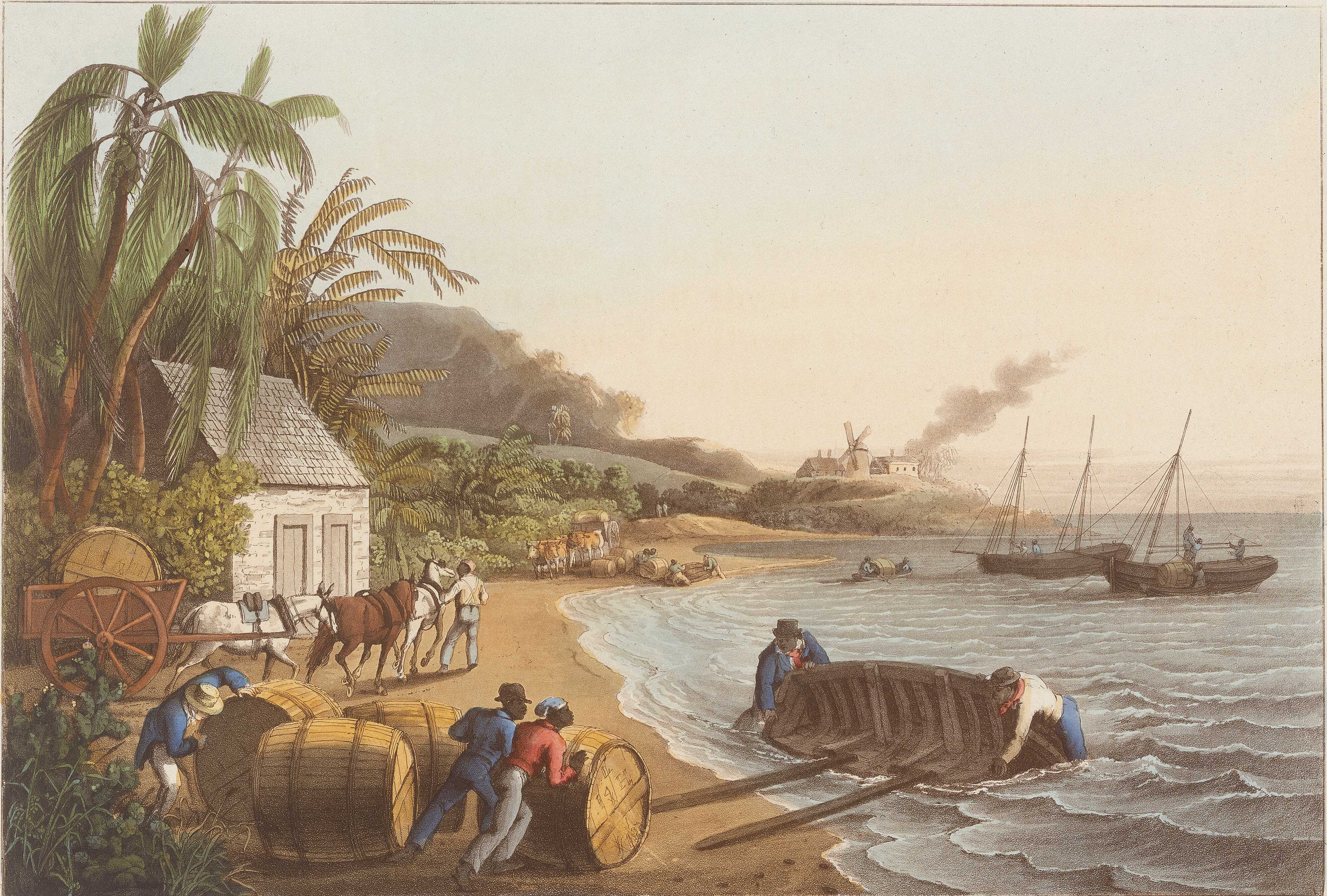
Sugar shipping out

- The Bambaras. Bambara was often used as a generic term for African slaves. European traders used Bambara as a term for defining vaguely a region of ethnic origin. Muslim traders and interpreters often used Bambara to indicate Non-Muslim captives. Slave traders would sometimes identify their slaves as Bambara in hopes of securing a higher price, as Bambara slaves were sometimes characterized as being more passive. Further confusing the name's indication of ethnic, linguistic, religious, or other implications, the concurrent Bambara Empire had notoriety for its practice of slave-capturing wherein Bambara soldiers would raid neighbors and capture the young men of other ethnic groups, forcibly assimilate them, and turn them into slave soldiers known as Ton. The Bambara Empire depended on war-captives to replenish and increase its numbers; many of the people who called themselves Bambara were indeed not ethnic Bambara.
- The Dunkos, a tattooed people whose women cherished their men with the utmost respect.
- The Aradas, a tattooed people who used poison to kill their enemies. They worshipped the moon, mollusks, and serpents. Toussaint Louverture was reportedly of Arada heritage.
- The people of Juida, a tattooed people whose women were known to be extroardinarily flirtatious. The women of Juida wore a heavy ring inside of their bottom lip, and the skin of their throat was modified with cuts of a knife.
- The people of Essa who religiously worshipped the dead king of their people as a divinity. They place his body in a pagoda following the main route of their capital on a richly ornamented throne, and worship him until the reigning King of Essa dies. The cadavre is embalmed with palm oil which conserves the body's freshness for a long time. The body is dressed very extravagantly, and a guardian watches it day and night as travelers come to visit and pay respects.
- The people of Urba, a fierce people who are arbitrary in their resolutions of revenge. If a murder takes place, the dead's relatives do not search for the killer; rather, they will hide and will disembowel the first passer-by without fear of a judiciary backlash, offering the victim's life as a sacrifice to their god Brataoth. They prepare the funeral of their relative, leaving the corpse of their victim exposed to the air, and devoured by ferocious beasts. They dig a huge trench where the murder was committed, so that the spirit of the dead may not wander to other places. The cadaver is embalmed and exposed and placed in an iron cage, so that the body is not touching the ground. For this reason the body is safe from carnivorous animals as they cannot get through the iron bars and the deepness of the trench. A little hut is constructed above the cage so that the weather does not interfere with the body.

The King of Urba often calls meetings of magic men that are called Makendals, whose purpose is to foresee the results of battles, and in the event of a defeat, to indicate which soldiers were responsible for the failure of the battle; the Makendals many times would arbitrarily call upon innocent men to face punishment for "criminal conduct" leading to the defeat.

When the King of Urba loses many of his people to war, he assembles the Makendal council, and consults the members on the way to repopulate his kingdom, where he is recommended to buy 1.one hundred gourde vases, 2.one hundred jugs, 3.one hundred slaves. The Makendals transport all of these on the major roadway, and order the slaves' bodies to be opened, where they pour red palm oil inside and specific shells, and bury all of these items at a specific location. This is the ritual of repopulation to gain favor from their gods.

- The Aminas who believed in metempsychosis, or the migration of the soul after death. When slaves from this ethnic group would arrive in Saint-Domingue, some would use suicide to return to the country of whence they came, believing that they would regain the rank, wealth, relatives, and friends that they lost after they were defeated in war.

For an example, an account of this metempsychosis occurred on the plantation of Mr.Desdunes, who had purchased an Amina woman and her two children. The woman and children had barely arrived on the island, and the woman was witnessed observing the Ester river, stopping every moment to measure the depth of the river, and making sighs while lifting her eyes to the sky.

One morning, the Amina woman was found drowned with her two children attached on her belt. The children's screams for help, echoing the horrors of their soon-to-be death, were heard by African fishermen, but not knowing to what to attribute the cause, they didn't go to the location to render aid.

- The Igbos who also believed in metempsychosis.
- The people of Borno had women who took very great care in selecting a suitable partner. The Borno women were absolutely submissive to their men, and sought to be bodily clean at all times. They would bathe three times a day and use palm oil to anoint their bodies.

In finding a partner, old women of Borno are chosen to examine the new wife, and they bring her to her nuptial bed playing instruments and singing chants of joy, if she is indeed found to be a virgin.

If, however, she is found not to be a virgin, she will be declared a prostitute. Prostitution in Borno was punished by enslavement; Borno prostitutes would be taken by order of the king, shipped to a coastal slave port to be sold to the first European slave ship that arrived.

During child birth, other Borno wise-women serve as nurses to provide aid to the soon-to-be mother. As the child is born and the umbilical cord is cut, the scissors used are placed carefully under the pillow of the baby. The scissors are not used again except for the purpose of cutting the umbilical cord.

New-born babies of Borno are tattooed eight days after their birth with the characteristics of their nation, which are placed on the face, the chest, on the arm, and elsewhere on the body. The designs are of a symmetrical sun, tongues of fire, diverse animals, of reptiles, and of prevalent architecture in their society.

The people of Borno do not eat meat unless it is sacrificed and blessed by their grand-priest, called an alpha. Pork is entirely banned from their diet.

A pilgrim to Borno will follow the main road with jugs filled with water, of which he offers to passer-byes or weary travelers.

Their common money is shells, and they have a great veneration for a prayer book that, if they touch it cannot leave before reading it, singing by memory. The people of Borno would rather sell all of their animals rather than diminish their piety for their sacred laws.

The Borno people have a code of laws for the punishment of crimes, following which require three witnesses to prosecute. Their good faith is so strong that if they are inclined to believe the witnesses, the accused will immediately be hung.

Every house in Borno is like small island surrounding a courtyard. At night, the whole family assembles in the home to avoid savage beasts like leopards & lions.

The King of Borno never leaves his palace, and if someone who enters into the palace dares to fix his eyes on him, he will be punished by death. While the king must make judgements in criminal proceedings, he is seated on a throne and hidden from the vision of the general population by a elegantly fashioned curtain. Any declaration he makes is echoed through the chamber by 7 pipes. The subject to whom the declaration is made indicates his submission to the judgement of the king by giving him his humble recognition, and he kneels, claps with his hands, and covers his head with ashes.

Thievery is abhorred in the society of Borno. If one is found guilty of thievery, the crime is not thought to be individual; indeed the whole family is charged with the crime. For example, if child of Borno takes something that doesn't belong to him, the courtiers of the king take the child and his whole family and sell them as slaves.

If a member of the royal court is found of adultery, he is punished with death. The woman will be drowned and the father and child are impaled and placed on the road to serve as an example.

The people of Borno can hunt once a year. They burn the grass in swamps to fetch the nests of aquatic fowl and take their eggs, and the turtles that hide in the area. As the people don't eat any meat except smoked, these provisions last for the whole year.

- The Mozambique people.
- The Dahomeans.
- The Accrans.
- The Crepans.
- The Assianthees.
- The Popans.
- The Fulanis.
- The Gabonese.
- The Malagasy
- The Congos were well known for their enjoyment of life. They lived life happily at a sweet and slow pace, and they loved dancing and relaxation; they were known for their great singing.
- The Senegalese people were often considered to be the most beautiful of the different African ethnicities found in Saint-Domingue.
- The Tacuas.
- The Hausas.
- The Nago Yoruba people.

=== European presence in Saint-Domingue ===
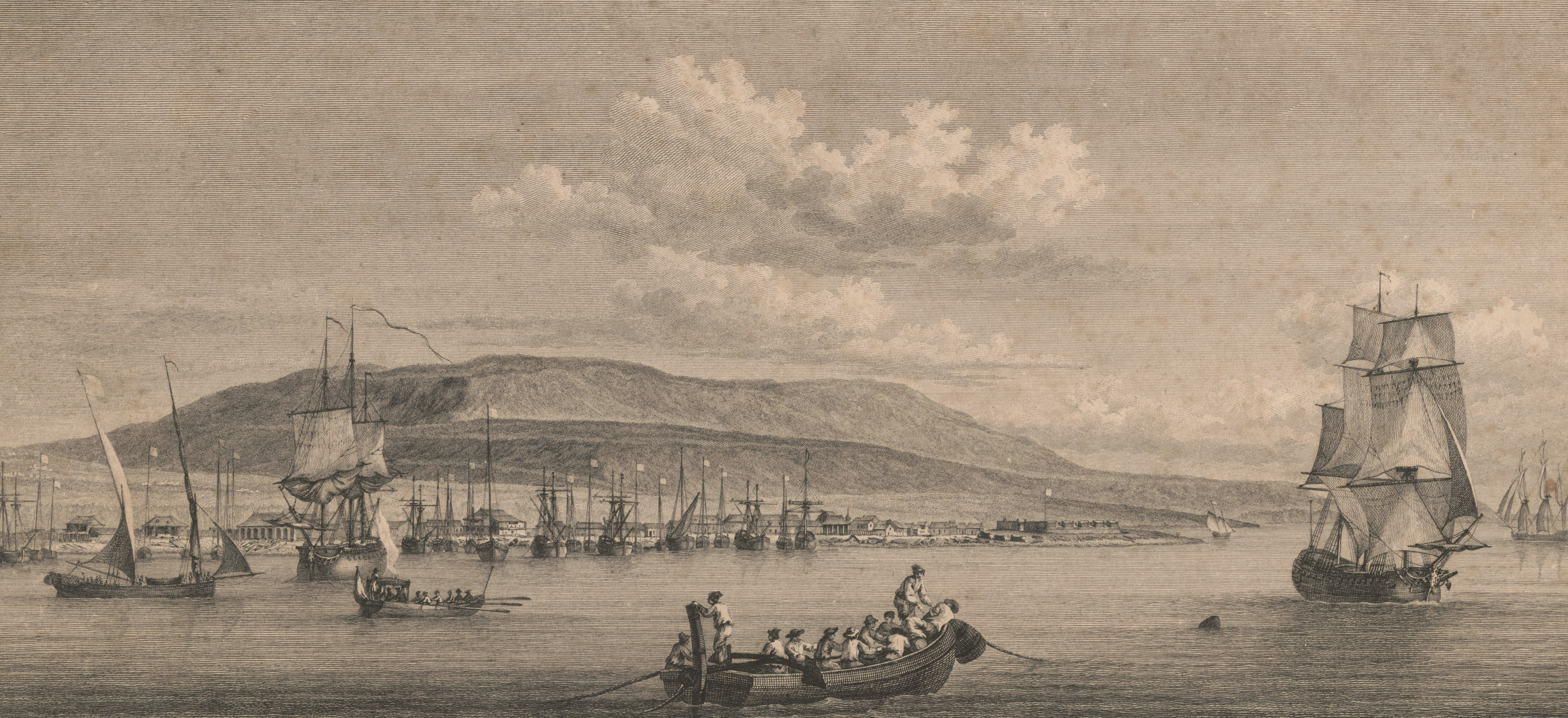
Môle-Saint-Nicolas in 1780

Saint-Domingue was populated by various groups of Europeans, including Frenchmen, Spaniards, Germans, as well as Acadians deported from old Acadia in North America.

In 1764, after the Grand Dérangement had exiled thousands of Acadians from their northern homelands, there was an attempt by French authorities to settle them at Môle-Saint-Nicolas, to shore up France's most lucrative colony of Saint-Domingue and build a base that could be used by the French Navy. It was a disaster, thanks to disease and shortages of food; a visiting French official reported: "The greatest criminal would have preferred the Galleys to a torture session in this plague-stricken place." Within a year, a reported 420 of the 700 Acadian settlers of Môle were dead, and most of the survivors fled to Louisiana shortly thereafter.

Bombardopolis was founded in 1764 by German settlers with the support of the nearby Director of Môle-Saint-Nicolas, Mr. Fusée Aublet. A population of Acadians and Germans who had been living in Louisiana had arrived in Môle-Saint-Nicolas; and the local government wished to separate those of German ancestry from the Acadians, judging the two cultures could not happily coexist. The new community was named after Fusée Aublet's German benefactor, Mr. de Bombarde, a wealthy financier and amateur naturalist.

=== Royalist curtailment of Creole rights ===
A Creole master fencer Jean-Louis Michel

Despite the cultural progress in Saint-Domingue, tensions between Creole families and royal administrators escalated. In 1769, Creole planters rallied Creoles of color and Petits blancs to help fight an unpopular militia reform. Although the Bourbon government crushed the uprising, it could not stomp out all of the Creole dissent. Creoles of all classes and colors resented the "tyrannical" royal administration.

European born soldiers died rapidly in tropical locations such as Saint-Domingue, and royal officials preferred a native Creole militia; but the united forces of the Creole planter class, Creoles of color, and Petits Blancs posed an enormous threat to Bourbon royalist control.

Starting in the early 1760s, and gaining much impetus after 1769, Bourbon royalist authorities began attempts to cut Creoles of color out of Saint-Domingue society, banning them from working in positions of public trust or as respected professionals. They began segregating theaters and other public spaces, and issued an edict preventing Creoles of color from dressing extravagantly and restricted their ability to ride in private carriages. They began referring to all Creoles of color as affranchis, a term that means ex-slave, an insult to all Creoles who came from long-standing free families. Militia companies also became segregated, and Creoles of color who previously served in militias with white Creoles were transferred into "colored" units.

The Bourbon government spread rumors to destroy the society's cohesiveness. Prior to the 1760s, visitors to Saint-Domingue frequently described the great beauty, romance, and allure of the mixed-race Creole women. Afterwards, they became known as dangerous temptations. Mixed-race men who were known for passion, handsomeness, and chivalry became restereotyped as highly sexual, narcissistic, lazy, and physically weak. This new form of prejudice shattered the older idea of a social continuum in Saint-Domingue as mixed-race men and women were deemed inferior to both white and black Creoles no matter their wealth in an attempt to oust them from their high positions as being morally and physically inferior to both groups.

The new color line drove the colony's wealthiest families of color into political action. In 1784, Julien Raimond, a free Creole of color planter, traveled to France to lobby the naval administrator to reform racist colonial policy implemented by the Bourbon government. More than a dozen wealthy Creole families supported Raimond's campaign, and continued supporting him in creating rights and equality for Creoles of color, which was the most important colonial issue during the years before the French Revolution in Saint-Domingue.

=== Downturn of Saint-Domingue's economy ===
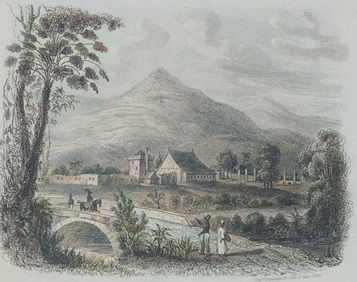
An image of Saint-Domingue's landscape

As the social systems of Saint-Domingue began to erode after the 1760s, the plantation economy of Saint-Domingue also began to weaken. The price of slaves doubled between 1750 and 1780 and land in Saint-Domingue tripled in price during the same period. Sugar prices still increased, but at a much lower rate than before. The profitability of other crops like coffee collapsed in 1770, causing many planters to go into debt. The planters of Saint-Domingue were eclipsed in their profits by enterprising businessmen; they no longer had a guarantee on their plantation investment, and the slave-trading economy came under increased scrutiny.

Along with the establishment of a French abolitionist movement, the Société des amis des Noirs, French economists demonstrated that paid labor or indentured servitude were much more cost-effective than slave labor. In principle the widespread implementation of indentured servitude on plantations could have produced the same output as slave labor. However, the Bourbon King Louis XVI didn't want to change the labor system in his colonies, as slave labor was directly responsible for allowing France to surpass Britain in trade. Nevertheless, Saint-Domingue did increase its reliance on indentured servants (known as Petits blanchets or engagés) and by 1789 about 6 percent of all white Creoles were employed as labor on plantations along with slaves.

Despite signs of economic decline, Saint-Domingue continued to produce more sugar than all of the British Caribbean islands combined.

=== Saint-Domingue Creoles in the American Revolutionary War ===
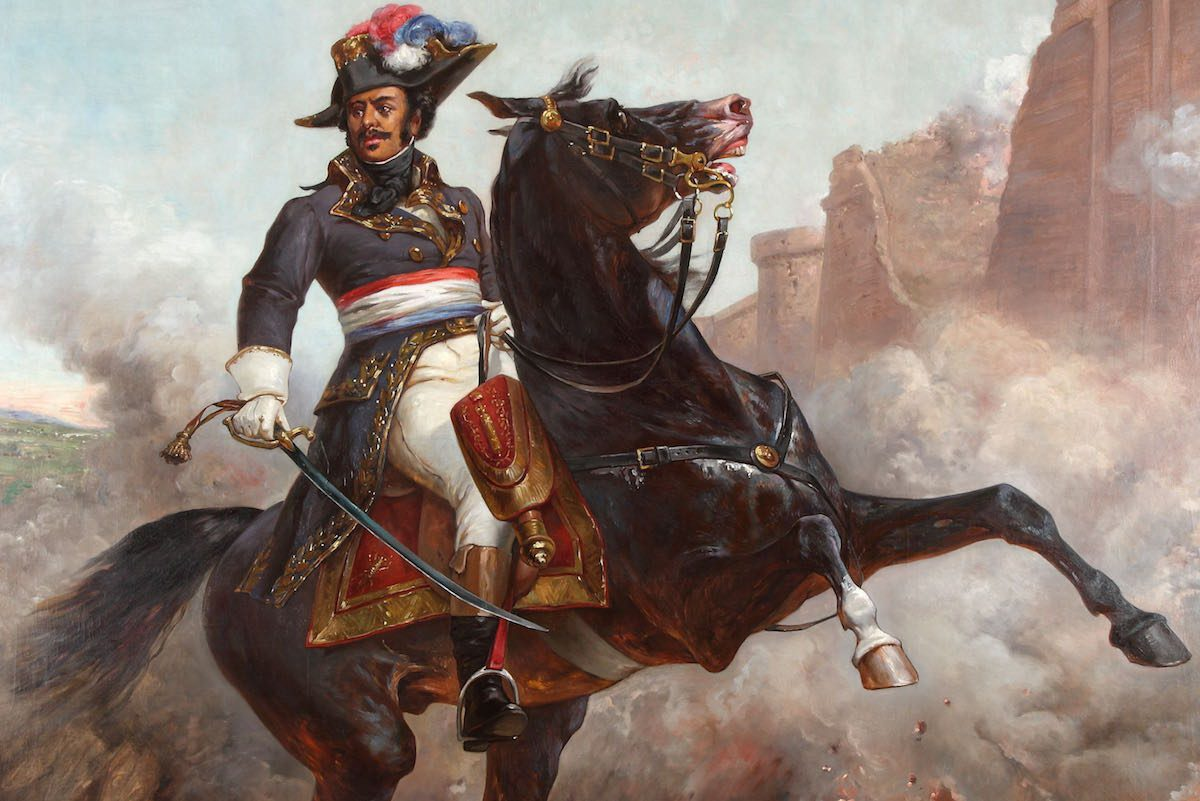
Thomas-Alexandre Dumas

Saint-Domingue Creoles such as Vincent Ogé, Jean-Baptiste Chavannes, and André Rigaud fought with American rebel forces during the American Revolutionary War. The Chasseurs-Volontaires de Saint-Domingue (Saint-Domingue Volunteers–Chasseurs) accompanied the Comte d'Estaing as part of the expeditionary force for service. The unit participated in the Siege of Savannah.

The expeditionary force under the command of d'Estaing and his lieutenant, Jean-Baptiste Bernard Vaublanc, left Cap-Français on 15 August 1779, and arrived on 8 September 1779, in Savannah, Georgia. After arriving they were tasked to help the American rebels attempting to gain control of the city which British forces captured in 1778.

The British Army sortied from their defenses on 24 September before dawn to engage their French and American besiegers. The Chasseurs-Volontaires fought back and lost one man while seven others were wounded, along with Comte D'Estaing. The siege ended in failure on 9 October 1779.

The French did not disband the Chasseurs-Volontaires, but instead continued to use the unit. The Chasseurs-Volontaires did not return to Saint-Domingue until 1780. Afterwards, the majority of the regiment served in Saint-Domingue as garrison troops.

== Revolutionary History of Saint-Domingue ==
=== The Rebellion of Saint-Domingue ===
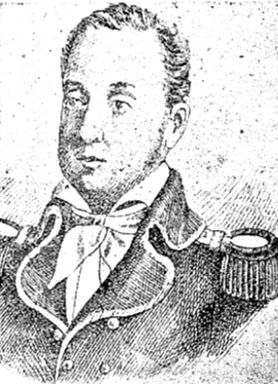
Saint-Domingue Creole aristocrat Vincent Ogé

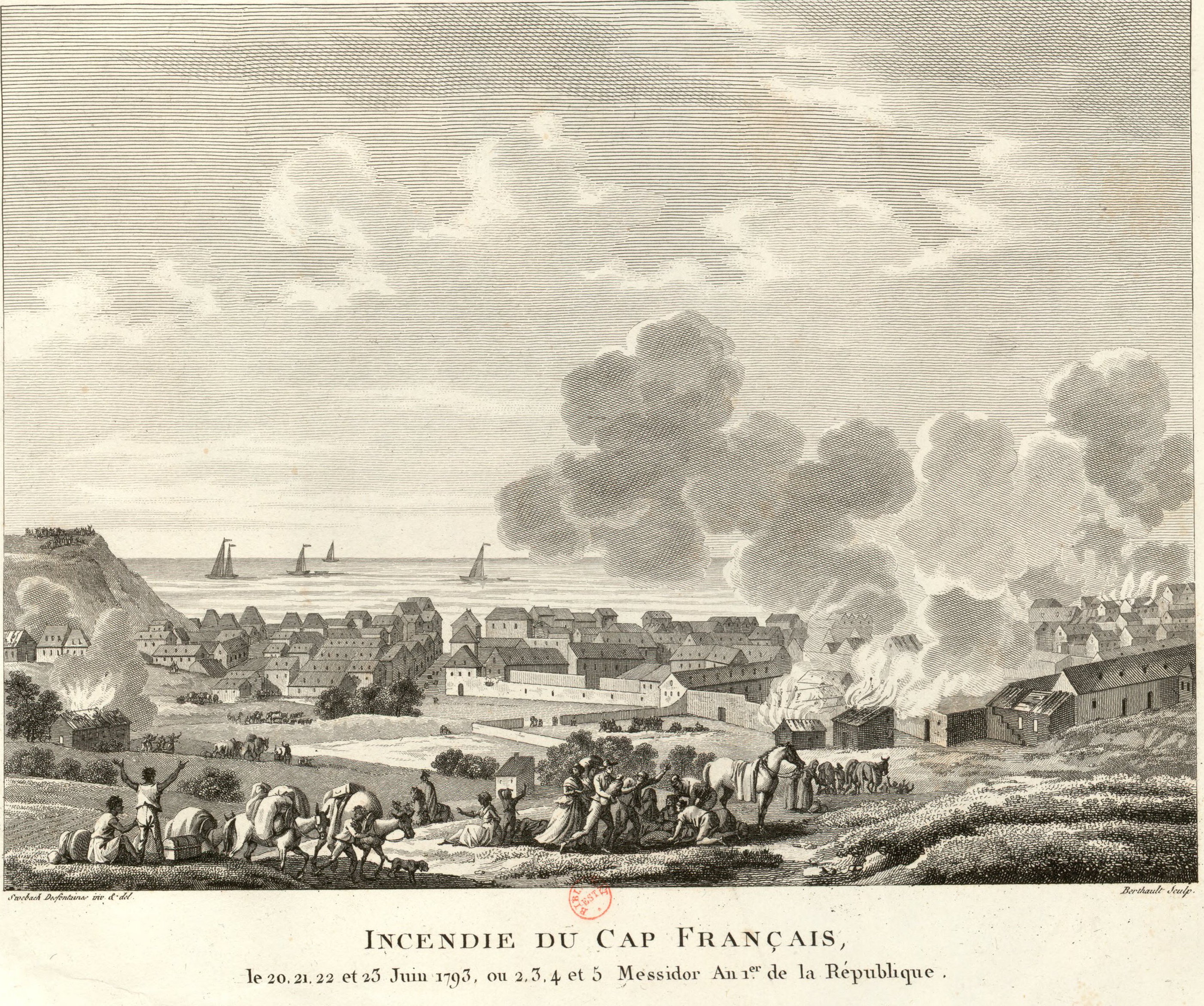
The burning of Cap-Français in 1793

As the French Revolution began in France, Creole aristocrats also began revolting against French rule. Wealthy Creole planters saw the French Revolution as an opportunity to gain independence from France. The elite planters intended to take control of the island and create favorable trade regulations to further their own wealth and power and to restore social & political equality granted to the Creoles.

Wealthy Creoles such as Vincent Ogé, Jean-Baptiste Chavannes, and the ex-governor of Saint-Domingue Guillaume de Bellecombe incited various revolts, including a slave revolt, aimed at overthrowing the Bourbon Regime. After Rebel Creole leaders defeated the Bourbon royalists, they lost control of the slave revolt, and to make matters worse, Britain and Spain began to invade the colony. As the rebellion in Saint-Domingue dragged on, it changed in nature from a political revolution to a racial war.

"The rebellion was extremely violent ... the rich plain of the North was reduced to ruins and ashes ..." After months of arson and murder, Toussaint Louverture, a planter and Jacobin from Saint-Domingue, took charge of the leaderless slave revolt; he formed an alliance with Spanish invasion forces.

The Republican revolutionaries in France had written the Declaration of the Rights of Man in 1789, and they to saw that slavery would need to be abolished. They sent a Republican commission with 15,000 troops and tons of arms to Saint-Domingue to abolish slavery and defend from British and Spanish invasion forces.

Republican delegate Léger-Félicité Sonthonax arrived in Saint-Domingue and he made an emancipation proclamation: the proclamation granted specific freedoms to all the slaves, but ultimately, only slaves in the north and west of Saint-Domingue were granted freedom. He was committed to make drastic decisions to prevent Britain and Spain from succeeding in their attempts to assume control over Saint-Domingue.

When the Republicans emancipated the slaves of Saint-Domingue, Toussaint Louverture decided to switch allegiances to the Republican government and double-cross Spain; he was cautious and awaited French ratification of emancipation before officially changing sides. In September and October, emancipation was extended throughout the colony. On February 4, 1794, the French National Convention ratified this act, applying it to all French colonies. Toussaint Louverture and his corps of well-disciplined, battle-hardened former slaves came over to the French Republican side in early May 1794.

Soon after his betrayal, Louverture eradicated all Spanish supporters, and put an end to the Spanish threat to Saint-Domingue. Republican France signed the Treaty of Basel of July 1795 with Spain, ending hostilities between the two countries.

=== Civil War and Invasion of Santo Domingo ===
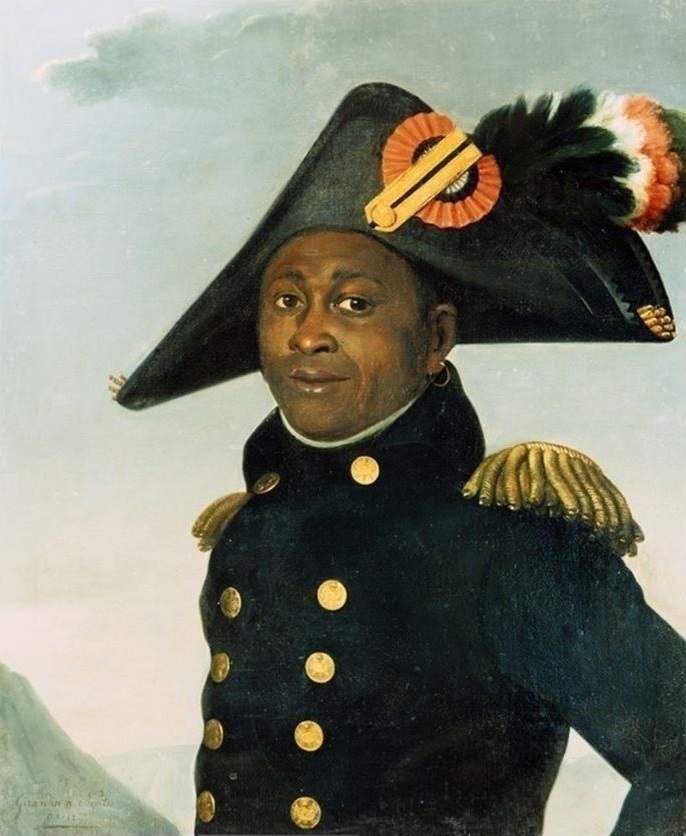
Governor-General-for-life of Saint-Domingue, Toussaint Louverture

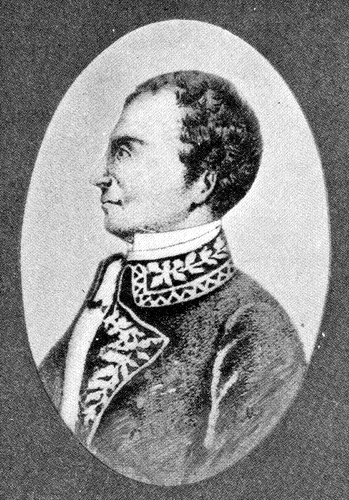
Saint-Domingue Creole general André Rigaud

For months, Louverture was in sole command of Saint-Domingue, except for a semi-autonomous state in the south, where general André Rigaud, a Creole of color, rejected the authority of the Republican Government. Both generals continued harassing the British, whose position on Saint-Domingue was increasingly weak.

On 30 April 1798, Louverture signed a treaty with the British general Thomas Maitland, exchanging the withdrawal of British troops from western Saint-Domingue in return for a general amnesty for the Creole-Bourbon royalists in those areas. In May, Port-au-Prince was returned to French rule in an atmosphere of order and celebration.

In 1799, the tensions between Louverture and Rigaud resurfaced. Louverture accused Rigaud of trying to assassinate him to gain power over Saint-Domingue. In June 1799, Louverture declared Rigaud a traitor and attacked the southern state. The resulting civil war, known as the War of Knives, lasted more than a year, with the defeated Rigaud fleeing to Guadeloupe, then France, in August 1800. Louverture delegated most of the campaign to his lieutenant, Jean-Jacques Dessalines, who became infamous, during and after the civil war, for murdering about 10,000 Creole captives and civilians. During the civil war in Saint-Domingue, Napoleon Bonaparte gained power in France.

After the civil war, in January 1801, Louverture invaded the Spanish territory of Santo Domingo, taking possession of it from the governor, Don Garcia, with few difficulties. The area was less developed and populated than the French section. Louverture brought it under French law, abolishing slavery and embarking on a program of modernization. He now controlled the entire island.

In March 1801, Louverture appointed a constitutional assembly, composed chiefly of planters, to draft a constitution for Saint-Domingue. He promulgated the Constitution on 7 July 1801, officially establishing his authority over the entire island of Hispaniola. It made him Saint-Domingue's governor-general for life with near absolute powers and the possibility of choosing his successor. However, Louverture did not declare Saint-Domingue's independence, acknowledging in Article 1 that it was a colony of the French Empire.

Many of Saint-Domingue's whites fled the island during the civil war. Toussaint Louverture, however, understood that they formed a vital part of the economy in Saint-Dommingue as a middle class, and in the hopes of slowing the impending economic collapse, he invited them to return. He gave property settlements and indemnities for war time losses, and promised equal treatment in his new Saint-Domingue; a good number of white Creole refugees did return. The refugees who came back to Saint-Domingue and believed in Toussaint Louverture's rule were later exterminated by Jean-Jacques Dessalines.

=== The Haitian Revolution in Saint-Domingue ===
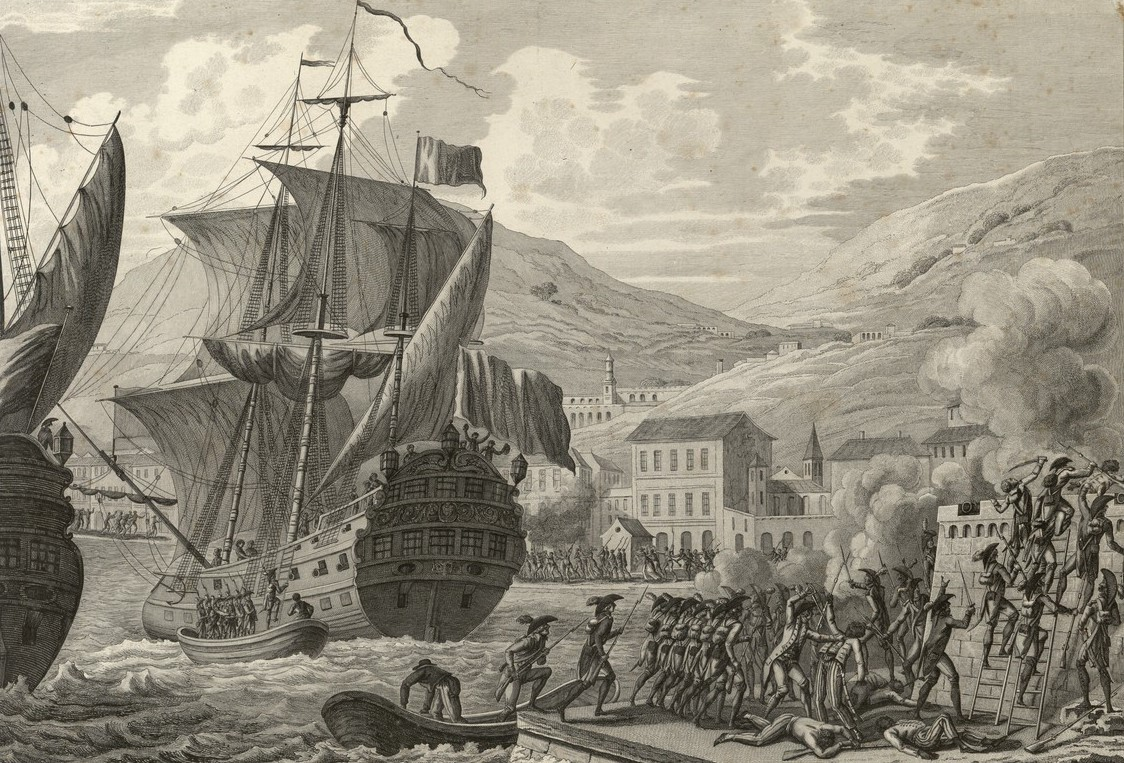
French forces capturing Cap-Français on 5 February 1802

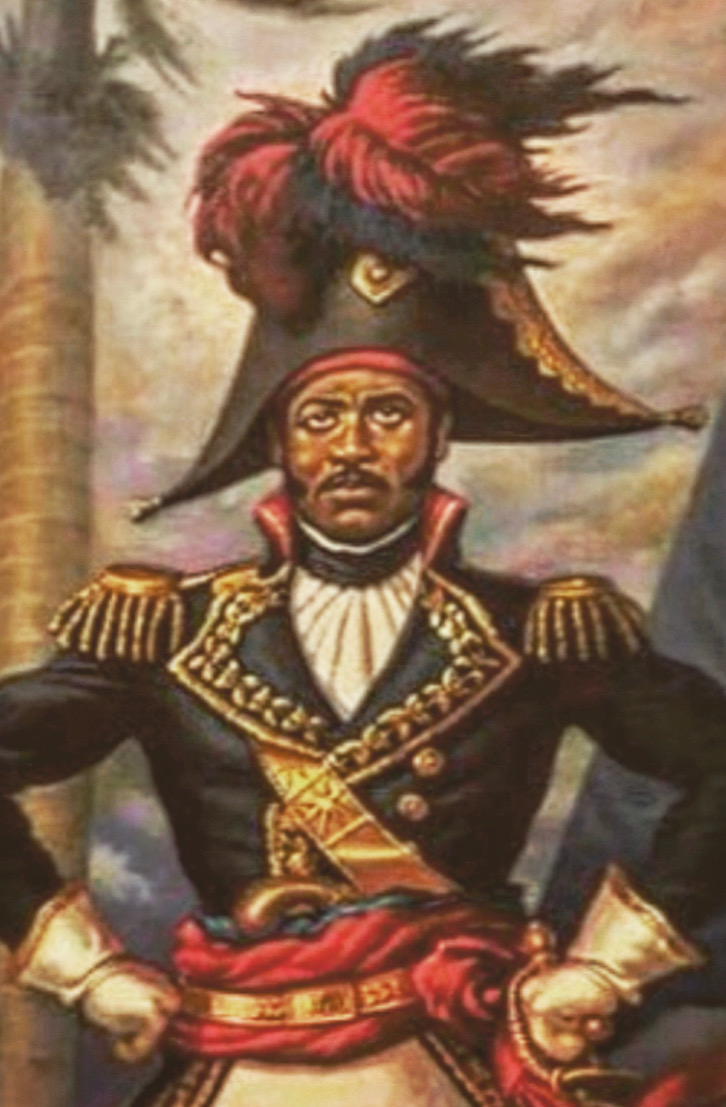
General Jean-Jacques Dessalines

Louverture strove to convince Bonaparte of his loyalty. He wrote to Napoleon, but received no reply. Napoleon eventually decided to send an expedition of 20,000 men to Saint-Domingue to restore French authority. Given the fact that France had signed a temporary truce with Great Britain in the Treaty of Amiens, Napoleon was able to plan this operation without the risk of his ships being intercepted by the Royal Navy.

Napoleon dispatched troops in 1802 under the command of his brother-in-law, General Charles Emmanuel Leclerc, to restore French rule to the island. Creole leaders who were defeated during the War of Knives such as André Rigaud and Alexandre Pétion accompanied Leclerc's French expeditionary forces. Both Louverture and Dessalines fought against the French expeditionary forces, but after the Battle of Crête-à-Pierrot, Dessalines defected from his long-time ally Louverture and joined Leclerc's forces.

Eventually, a ceasefire was enacted between Louverture and the French expeditionary forces. During this ceasefire, Louverture was captured & arrested. Jean-Jacques Dessalines was at least partially responsible for Louverture's arrest, as asserted by several authors, including Louverture's son, Isaac. On 22 May 1802, after Dessalines learned that Louverture had failed to instruct a local rebel leader to lay down his arms per the recent ceasefire agreement, he immediately wrote to Leclerc to denounce Louverture's conduct as "extraordinary".

Leclerc originally asked Dessalines to arrest Louverture, but he declined. Jean Baptiste Brunet was ordered to do so, and he deported Louverture and his aides to France, claiming that he suspected the former leader of plotting an uprising. Louverture warned, "In overthrowing me you have cut down in Saint-Domingue only the trunk of the tree of liberty; it will spring up again from the roots, for they are numerous and they are deep."

When it became clear that the French intended to re-establish slavery on Saint-Domingue, as they already had on Guadeloupe, Dessalines switched sides again in October 1802, to oppose the French. By November 1802, Dessalines had become the leader of the slave rebellion. Leclerc died of yellow fever, which also killed many French troops. Dessaline's forces achieved a series of victories against the French.

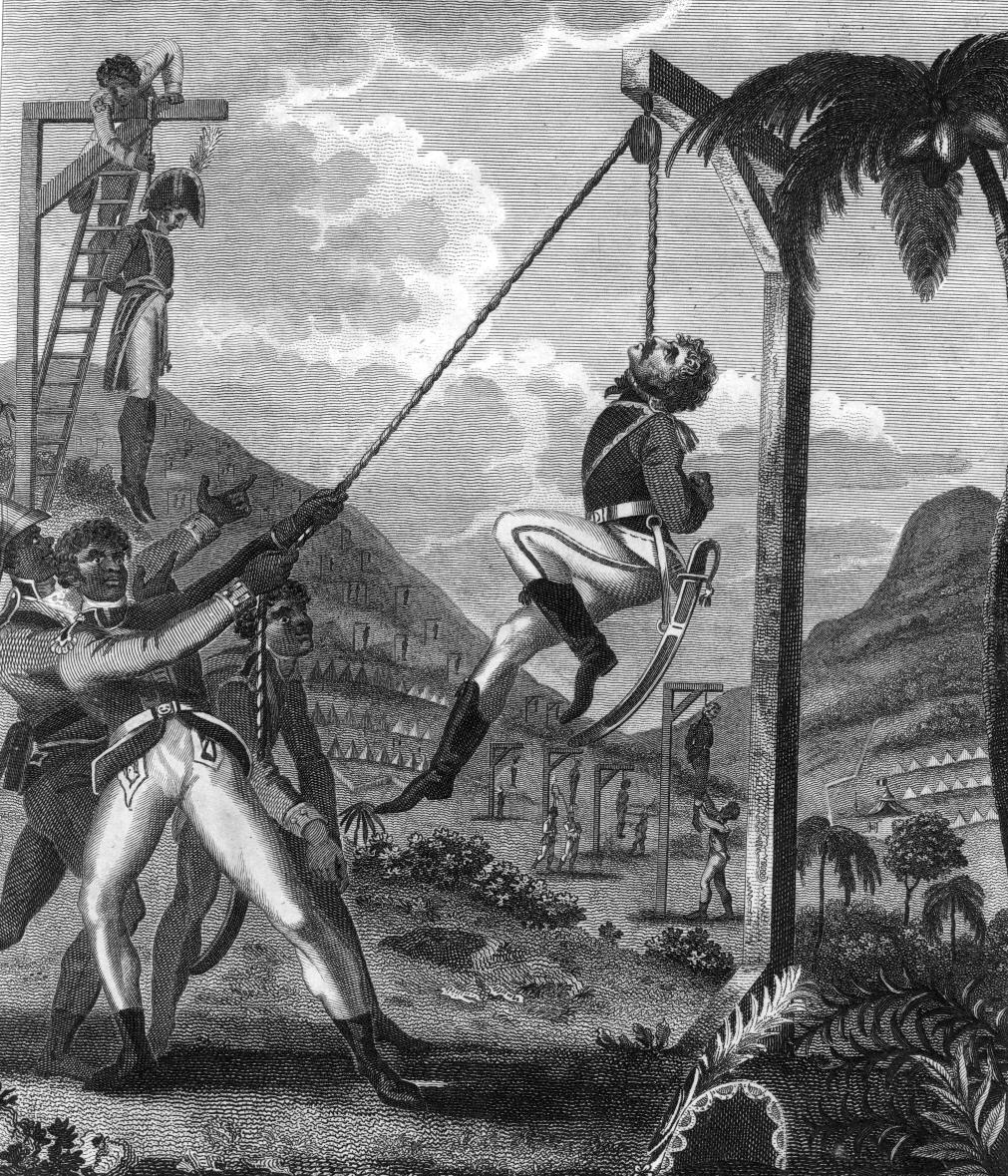
Black troops hanging French prisoners

Dessalines named himself Governor-General-for-life of Saint-Domingue on 30 November 1803. On 4 December 1803, the French expeditionary army surrendered its last remaining territory to Dessalines's forces. This officially ended the only slave rebellion in world history which successfully resulted in establishing an independent nation.

On 1 January 1804, from the city of Gonaïves, Dessalines officially declared the former colony's independence and renamed it "Haiti" after the indigenous Taíno name. After the declaration of independence, Dessalines named himself Governor-General-for-life of Haiti and served in that role until 22 September 1804, when he was proclaimed Emperor of Haiti by the generals of the Haitian revolutionary army.

=== Genocide of the remaining whites in Saint-Domingue ===
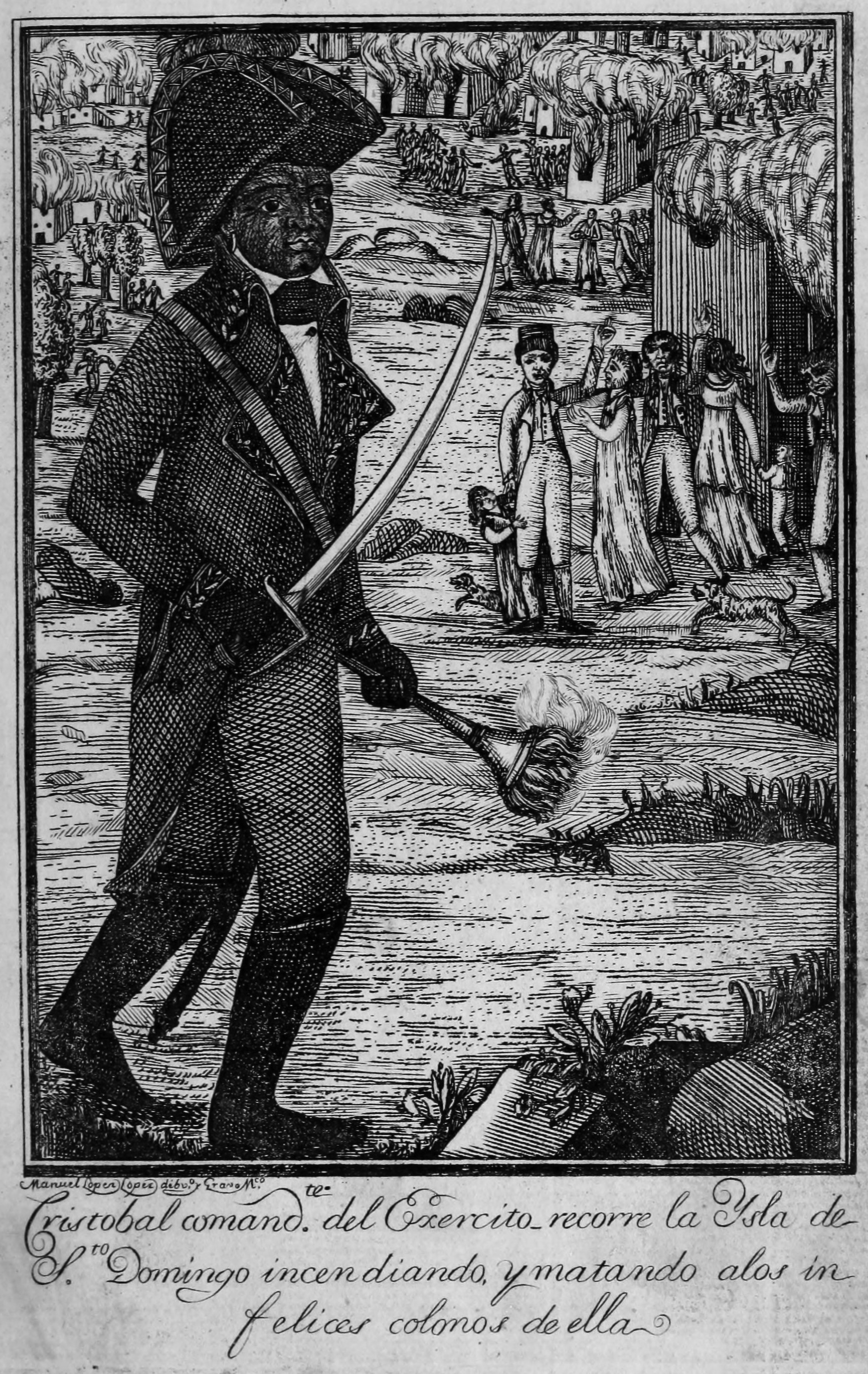
Henri Christophe during the 1804 Haitian massacre

Between February and April 1804, Governor-General-for-life Jean-Jacques Dessalines ordered the genocide of all remaining whites in Haitian territory. He decreed that all those suspected of conspiring in the acts of the expeditionary army should be put to death, including Creoles of color and freed slaves deemed traitors to Dessalines' regime. Dessalines gave the order to the cities of Haiti that all white people should also be put to death. The weapons used should be silent weapons such as knives and bayonets rather than gunfire, so that the killing could be done more quietly, and avoid warning intended victims by the sound of gunfire and thereby giving them the opportunity to escape.

From early January 1804 until 22 April 1804, squads of soldiers moved from house to house throughout Haiti, torturing and killing entire families. Eyewitness accounts of the massacre describe imprisonment and killings even of whites who had been friendly and sympathetic to the Haitian Revolution.

The course of the massacre showed an almost identical pattern in every city he visited. Before his arrival, there were only a few killings, despite his orders. When Dessalines arrived, he demanded that his orders about mass killings of the area's white population should be put into effect. Reportedly, he ordered the unwilling to take part in the killings, especially men of mixed race, so that the blame should not be placed solely on the black population. Mass killings took place on the streets and in places outside the cities.

In parallel to the killings, plundering and rape also occurred. Women and children were generally killed last. White women were "often raped or pushed into forced marriages under threat of death."

Dessalines did not specifically mention that the white women should be killed, and the soldiers were reportedly somewhat hesitant to do so. In the end, however, the women were also put to death, though normally at a later stage of the massacre than the adult males. The argument for killing the women was that whites would not truly be eradicated if the white women were spared to give birth to new Frenchmen.

Before his departure from a city, Dessalines would proclaim an amnesty for all the whites who had survived in hiding during the massacre. When these people left their hiding place however, they were murdered as well. Some whites were, nevertheless, hidden and smuggled out to sea by foreigners. There were notable exceptions to the ordered killings. A contingent of Polish defectors were given amnesty and granted Haitian citizenship for their renouncement of French allegiance and support of Haitian independence. Dessalines referred to the Poles as "the White Negroes of Europe", as an expression of his solidarity and gratitude.

=== The Empire of Haiti ===
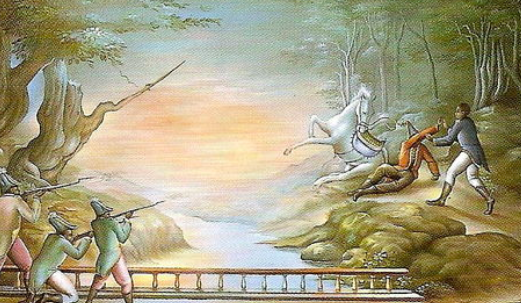
The assassination of Emperor Jean-Jacques Dessalines, 17 October 1806

Dessalines was crowned Emperor Jacques I of the Haitian Empire on 6 October 1804 in the city of Cap-Haïtien. On 20 May 1805, his government released the Imperial Constitution, naming Jean-Jacques Dessalines emperor for life with the right to name his successor. Dessalines declared Haiti to be an all-black nation and forbade whites from ever owning property or land there. The generals who served under Dessalines during the Haitian Revolution became the new planter class of Haiti.

In order to slow the economic collapse of Haiti, Dessalines enforced a harsh regimen of plantation labor on newly freed slaves. Dessalines demanded that all blacks work either as soldiers to defend the nation or return to the plantations as labourers, so as to raise commodity crops such as sugar and coffee for export to sustain his new empire. His forces were strict in enforcing this, to the extent that some black subjects felt they were enslaved again. Haitian society became feudal in nature as workers could not leave the land they worked.

Dessalines was assassinated on 17 October 1806 by rebels led by Haitian generals Henri Christophe and Alexandre Pétion; his body was found dismembered and mutilated. Dessalines' murder did not solve the tensions in Haiti; instead, the country was torn into two new countries led by each general. The Northern State of Haiti (later the Kingdom of Haiti) maintained forced plantation labor and became rich, while the Southern Republic of Haiti abandoned forced plantation labor and collapsed economically.

== Saint-Domingue Creoles after the Haitian Revolution ==
=== Saint-Domingue Creoles in New Orleans, Louisiana ===
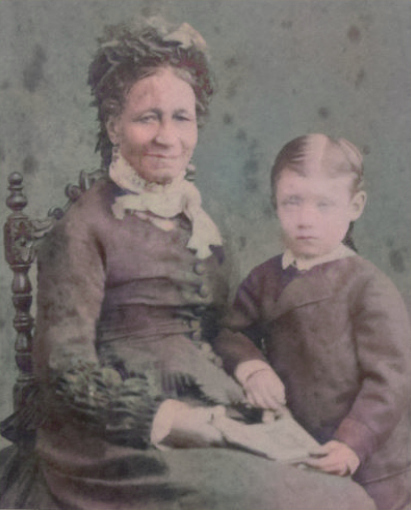
Elisabeth Dieudonné Vincent with her granddaughter

The Creoles of Saint-Domingue fled to many places in the United States, other Antilles islands, New York City, Cuba, France, Jamaica, and especially New Orleans in Louisiana. More than half of all Saint-Domingue's refugees eventually settled in New Orleans.

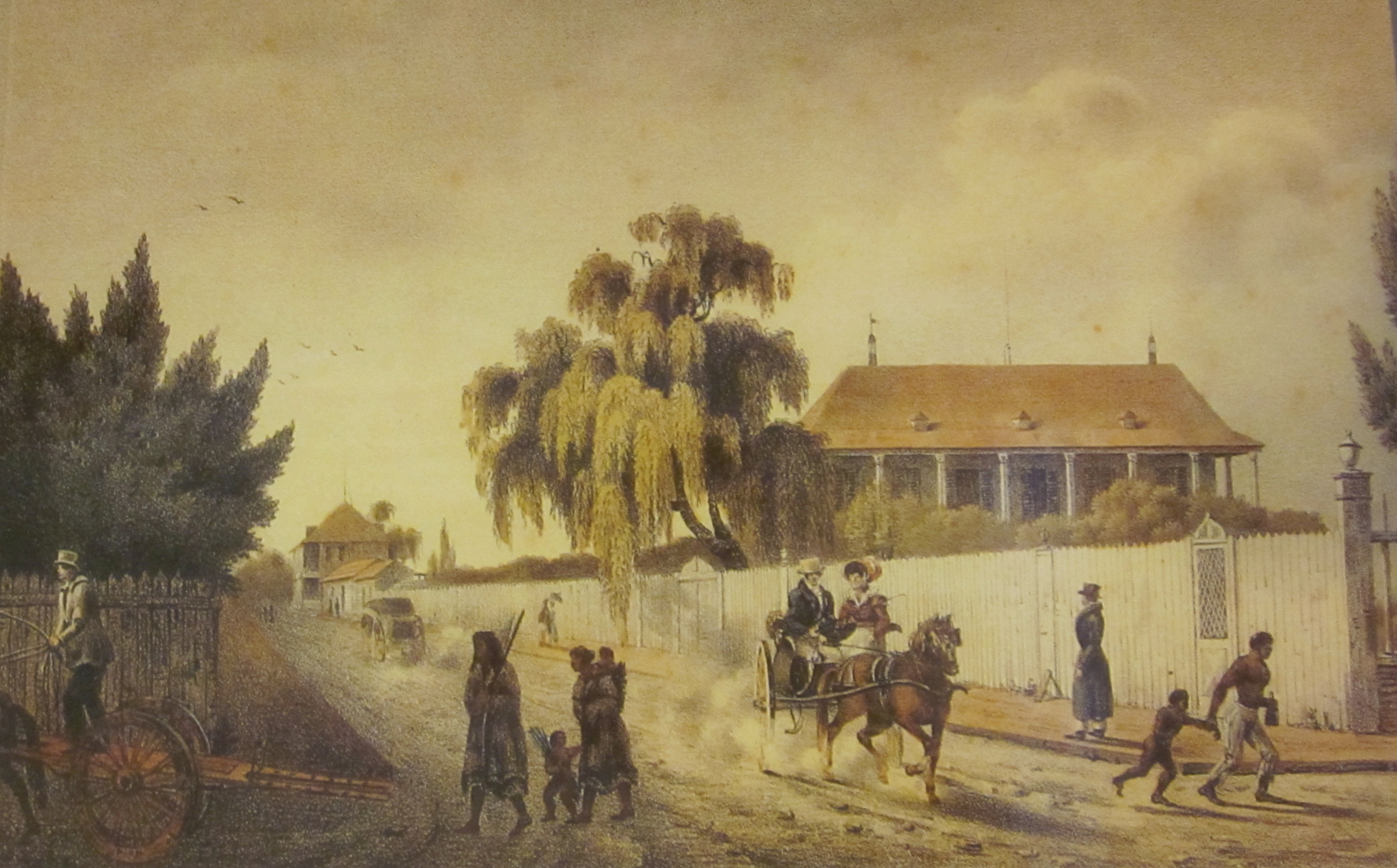
The Faubourg Marigny in New Orleans, Louisiana

The Saint-Domingue Creoles established new sugar, coffee, and tobacco plantations in Cuba, jumpstarting the island's economy, particularly in coffee production. More than 25,000 refugees settled the cities of Baracoa (Guantanamo Province) and Santiago de Cuba. Most of these Creoles were later expelled from Cuba to Louisiana.

Although Spanish and American authorities forbade access of slaves into Cuba and Louisiana, some concessions were made to the fleeing refugees. Many of the slaves who accompanied these refugees came willingly, as they feared the bloodshed, murder, pillaging, lawlessness, and economic collapse in Saint-Domingue.

"I find myself with my wife six months pregnant, feeding a son not yet eight months old; my brother is more fortunate than I, for he is without his wife and his child who were compelled by poor health to remain temporarily at Saint-Domingue. We were constrained to abandon our possessions and our servants, who have shown us fidelity and attachment, which did not permit us at the last minute to hide from them our route and plans. 'What is going to become of us,' these poor unfortunates said to us, 'if you abandon us in this lost and ruined country? Take us with you, any place you want to go; we will follow you anywhere. As long as we die with you, we will be happy.' Moved by this speech that each of them expressed in his own way, and all in a manner that appeared natural to us, how could we have concealed from them the uncertainty clouding the attempt which we, acting out of gratitude, must make to bring them to Louisiana. We could only promise to request permission."

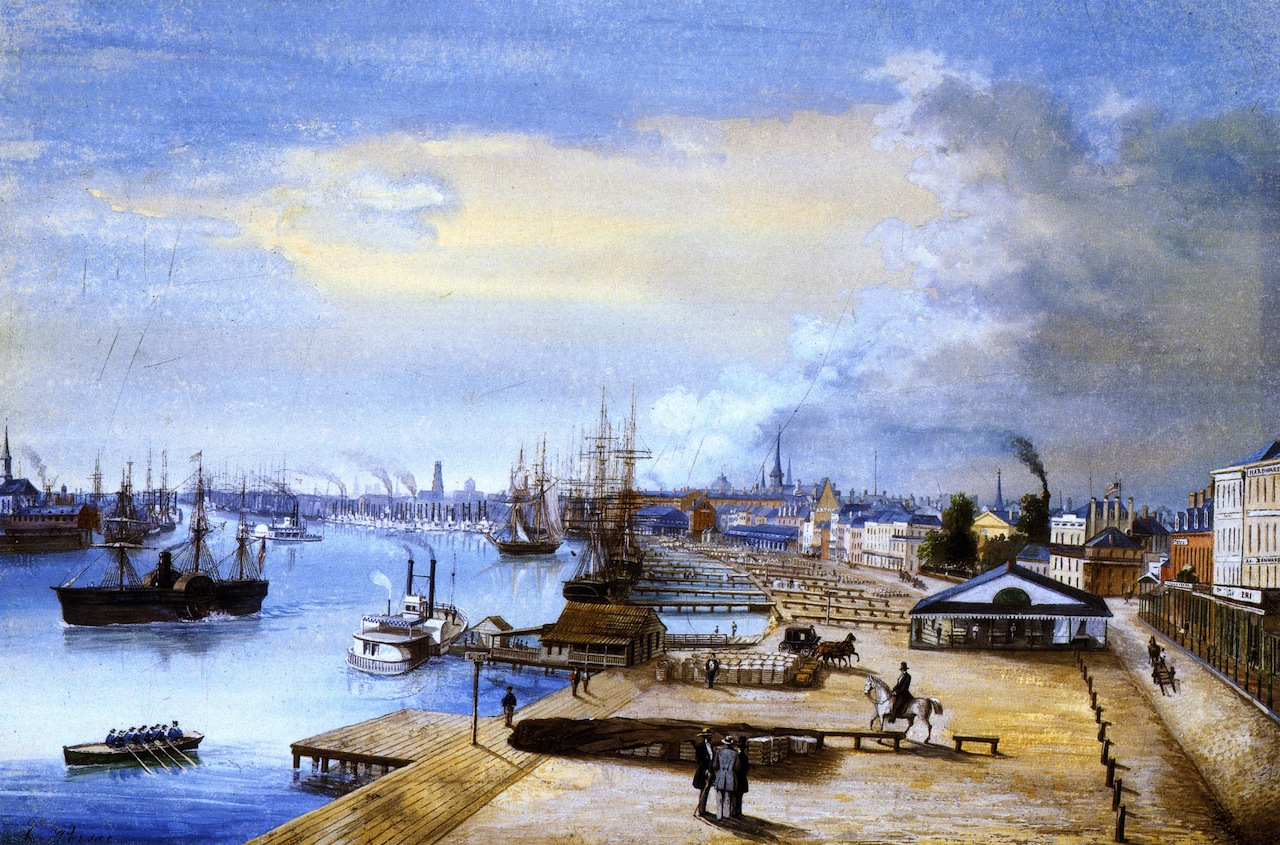
New Orleans, the metropolis of the Creole State

When refugees from Saint-Domingue arrived with slaves, they often followed the old Creole customs such as the liberté des savanes (savannah liberty), where the owner allowed their slaves to be free to find work at their own convenience in exchange for a flat weekly or monthly rate. They often became domestics, cooks, wig makers, and coachmen.

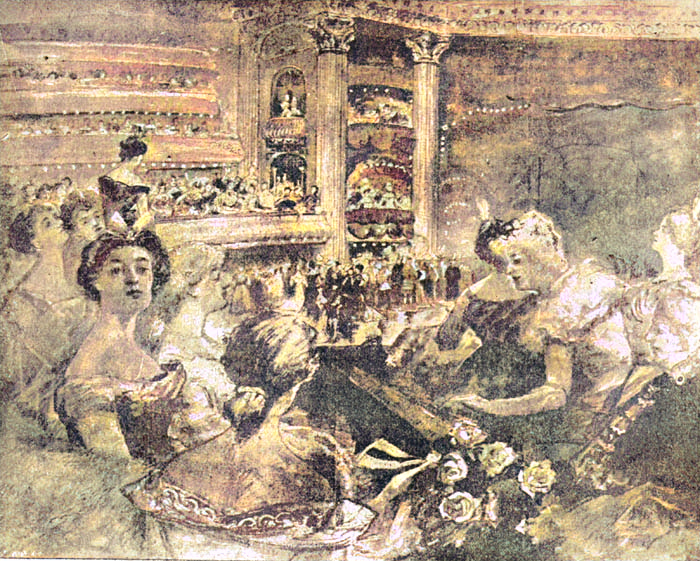
New Orleans Creoles at the French Opera

Although Saint-Domingue Creoles remained concentrated in the city of New Orleans, some very slowly scattered into surrounding parishes. There, manual labor for agriculture was in greatest demand. The scarcity of slaves made Creole planters turn to Petits habitants (Creole peasants), and immigrant indentured servitude to supply manual labor; they complimented paid labor with slave labor. On many plantations, free people of color and whites toiled side-by-side with slaves. This multi-class state of affairs converted many minds to the abolition of slavery.

High yields of the Creole plantations were partially obtained by better agricultural technology, but also by a more rational use of manual labor. The comparison of task completion rates between slave labor and paid labor proved that slave workers produced inferior quality work to paid employees. The maintenance of expensive slave labor then could only be justified by the social status that they conferred upon the proprietary planter. The following passage is the conversation between two Creole planters on the emancipation of slaves.

-D'après ce que j'entends... on trouverait en vous, tout propriétaire d'esclaves que vous êtes, un chaud partisan de l'émancipation des noirs?

–Sans doute, répondit M.Melvil, si cette émancipation, sagement calculée, et progressivement amenée, fournit des citoyens paisibles et non des malfaiteurs de plus à nos États du Sud, si vastes que, pour les peupler, nous recevons, sans leur demander aucune exhibition de papiers, tous les fugitifs, qu'ils soient poursuivis ou condamnés par la vangeance des souverains, ou la justice des tribunaux européens.

–Mais, objecta le créole, sans esclaves que deviendraient nos plantations?

–Les affranchis les cultiveraient moyennant un salaire.

–L'expérience a démontré que les nègres libres sont les ouvriers les plus paresseux de la terre.

–Ils cesseront de l'être quand ils seront familiarisés avec la civilisation. Ils connaîtront alors de nouveaux besoins, de nouvelles jouissances. Le désir de les satisfaire leur ouvrira les yeux sur la nécessité du travail, auquel ils se livreront plus mollement peut-être à l'état de liberté qu'à celui d'esclavage, mais toujours plus efficacement que ces engagés qui nous arrivent d'Europe par cargaisons, et dont il se trouve à peine dix sur quarante capables de résister aux influences énervantes et souvent délétères de notre climat.

–From what I hear... we would find in you, as much of the slave holder that you are, a strong voice for black emancipation?

–Without a doubt, responded Mr.Melvil, if this emancipation, wisely calculated, and brought about progressively, furnished peaceful citizens and not more wrong-doers to our Southern States, so vast are they that, to populate them, we receive, without asking any show of papers, all fugitives, whether they be condemned by revenge from their rulers, or from the law of European councils.

–But, objected the Creole, without slaves, what will become of our plantations?

–The affranchis (freedmen) shall farm and earn a wage.

–Past experience has shown that freed slaves are some of the laziest workers in the world.

–They shall not be any longer once they are familiarized with our civilization. They will become acquainted with new needs, and new enjoyments. The desire to satisfy them will open their eyes to the necessity of work, which perhaps shall bring them softly to the state of freedom rather than remaining in that of slavery, but more efficiently than these engagés (indentured servants) who arrive from Europe in boatloads, and of whom barely ten out of forty are capable of surviving the vexatious and often deadly influences of our climate.

A Young New Orleans Creole lady

The large, rich families of old Saint-Domingue were almost nowhere to be found in Louisiana. They no longer possessed the social status from having a large number of slaves and vast plantations. Indeed, the majority of refugees who made a mark on 19th century Louisiana and Louisiana Creole culture came from the lower classes of Saint-Domingue.

The flag of New Orleans, Louisiana

There was chronic tension between the Louisiana Creoles and Anglo-Americans, and the reinforcement of the Creole culture by the refugees garnered a major negative reaction. The Americans had counted on their waves of immigration to replace the Creole population with an English-speaking majority. The hopes for rapid Americanization in Louisiana were dashed by the influx of refugees in 1809.

Anglo-Americans harbored much hostility towards the Creole refugees, as they would identify them with the history of their revolution. While Louisiana Creoles embraced the incoming population, Americans found white Saint-Domingue Creoles to be repulsive, as they would intermingle with people of color, frequenting taverns and drinking with Creoles of color and slaves.

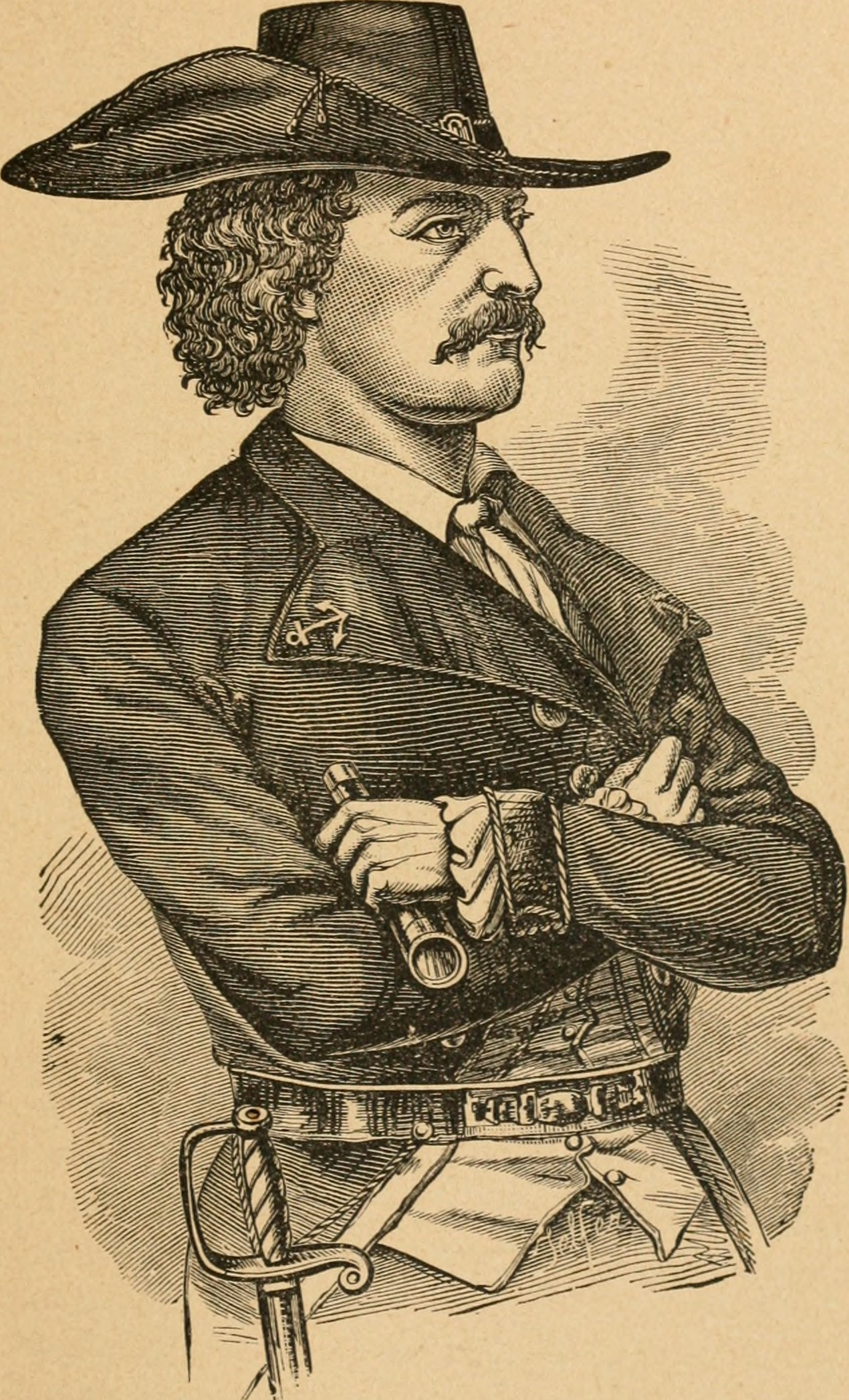
Jean Lafitte the pirate

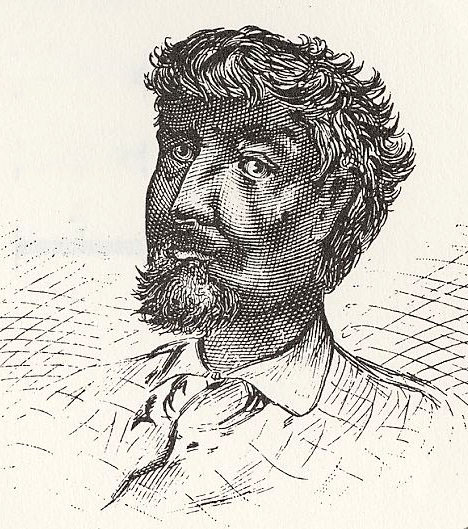
Jean Baptiste du Sable, founder of Chicago

The Saint-Domingue Creole specialized population raised Louisiana's level of culture and industry, and was one of the reasons why Louisiana was able to gain statehood so quickly. A quote from a Louisiana Creole who remarked on the rapid development of his homeland reads:

"Nobody knows better than you just how little education the Louisianians of my generation have received and how little opportunity one had twenty years ago to procure teachers... Louisiana today offers almost as many resources as any other state in the American Union for the education of its youth. The misfortunes of the French Revolution have cast upon this country so many talented men. This factor has also produced a considerable increase in the population and wealth. The evacuation of Saint-Domingue and lately that of the island of Cuba, coupled with the immigration of the people from the East Coast, have tripled in eight years the population of this rich colony, which has been elevated to the status of statehood by virtue of a governmental decree."

In New York City, the famous French lawyer and gastronome Jean Anthelme Brillat-Savarin found Saint-Domingue Creoles in Manhattan and recounts an encounter with one such refugee:

"I sat next to a Creole one day at dinner, who had lived for two years in New York, and still did not know enough English to ask for bread. I expressed my astonishment at this; "Bah," he replied, "do you suppose I would ever trouble to learn the language of so dull a race?"

Jean Baptiste du Sable believed from Saint-Domingue, founded the city of Chicago.

Jean Lafitte the pirate king who ruled his kingdom in Barataria Bay of Louisiana, was believed to be a Creole from Saint-Domingue.

Some refugees from Saint-Domingue did attempt to perpetuate French Revolutionary ideas on their arrival into Louisiana and Cuba, which American and Spanish authorities feared:

"...many adventurers who are daily coming into the Territory from every quarter, possess revolutionary principles and restless, turbulent dispositions..."

Their fears were eventually confirmed; in 1805, Grandjean, a white Creole from Saint-Domingue and his compatriot accomplices attempted to incite a slave rebellion aimed at overthrowing the American government in Louisiana. The plan was foiled by New Orleanian Creole of color who revealed the plot to American authorities. The Americans sentenced Grandjean and his accomplices to work on a slave chain-gang for the rest of their lives.

=== Saint-Domingue Creoles in Haiti ===
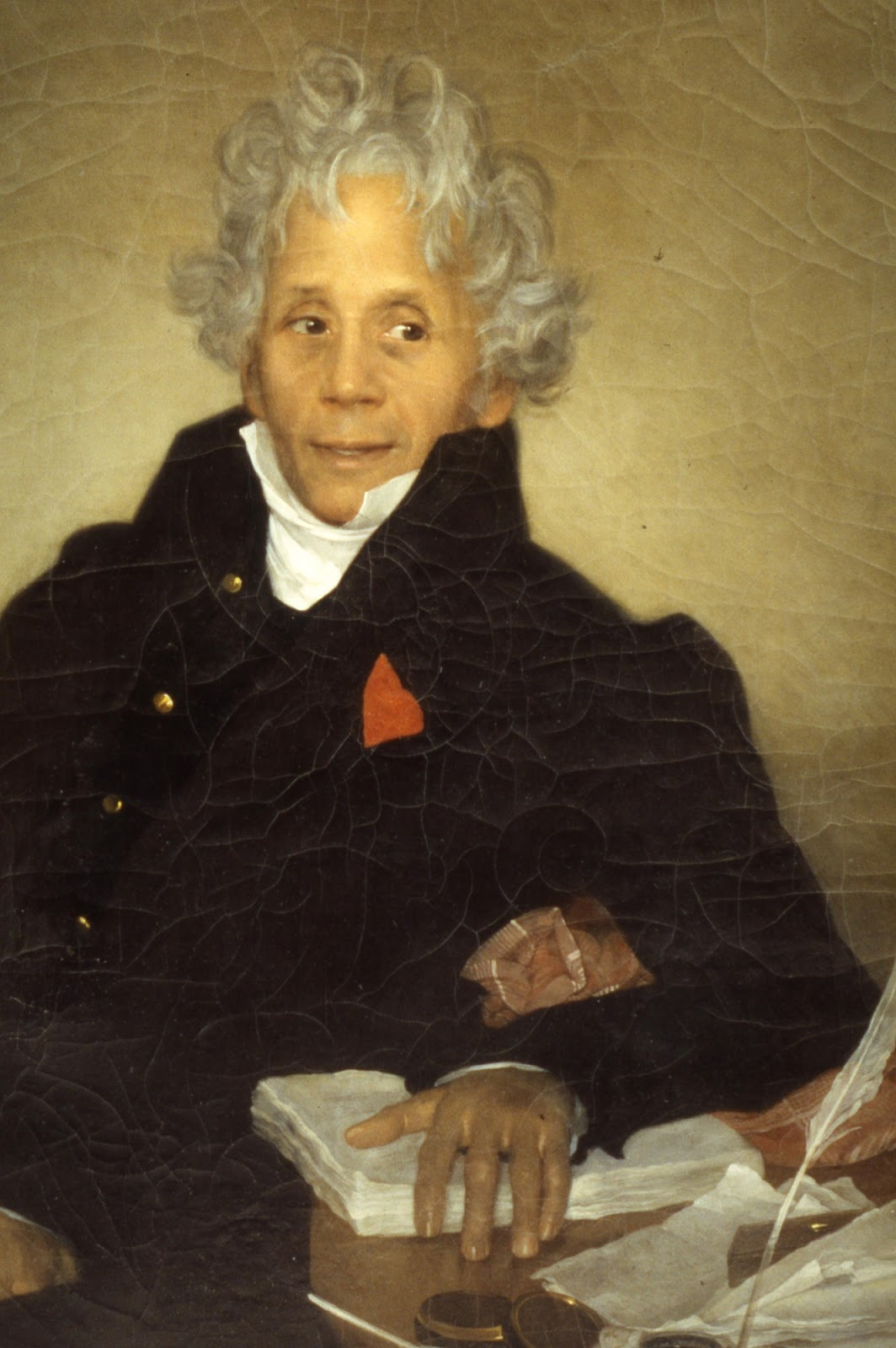
Physician and surgeon, François Fournier de Pescay

François Fournier de Pescay was among the Creoles who fled and did not return to Haiti after its independence.

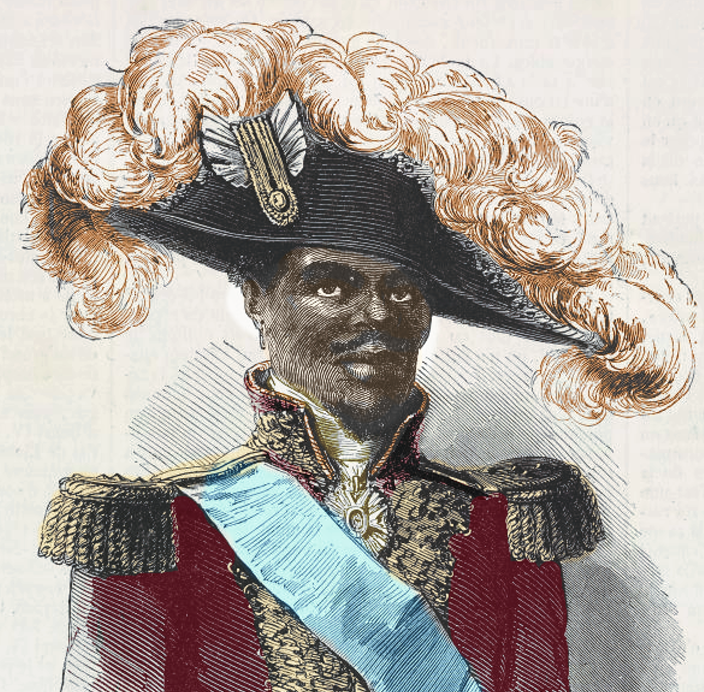
Haitian prince Jean-Joseph Soulouque

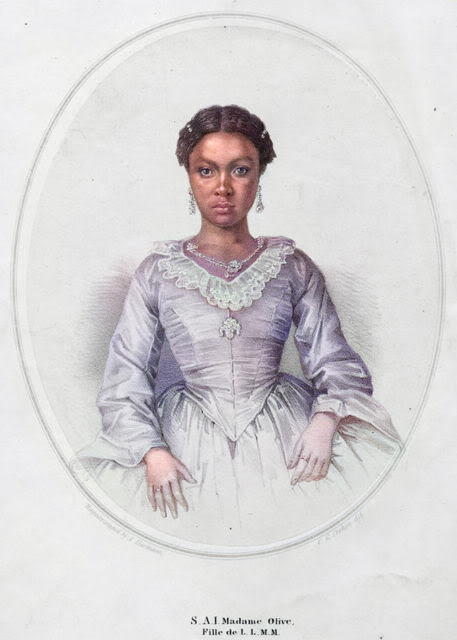
Haitian princess Olive Soulouque

Haiti's new elite class styled itself after Creole customs, and it identified itself as the successor of the Saint-Domingue, promoting Creole arts and culture while emphasizing Saint-Domingue's historical role of being the center of French Creole civilization in the Americas.

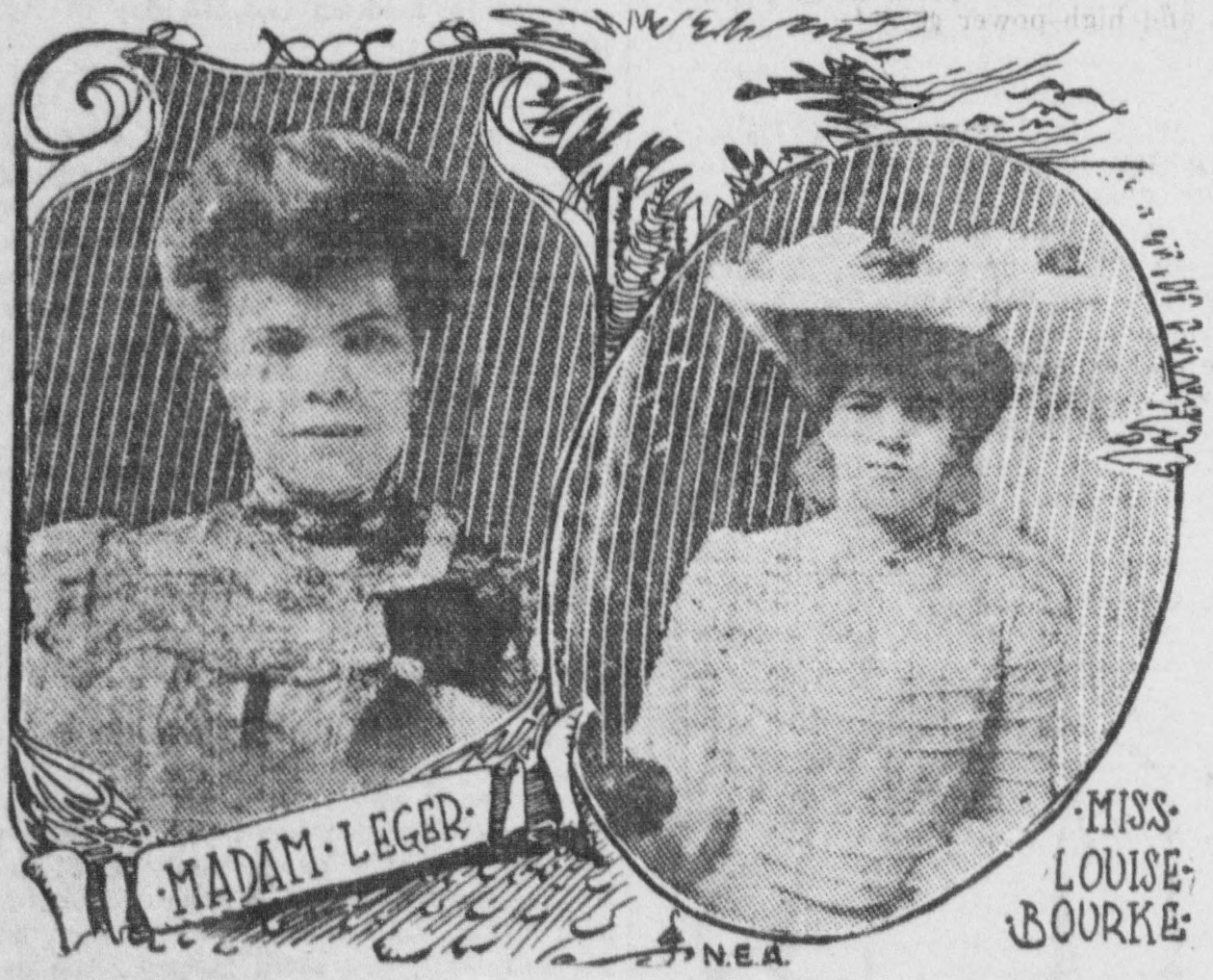
Haitian aristocrats Madame Leger and Louise Bourke, 1904

Many Louisiana Creoles of Saint-Domingue origins fled to Haiti during the American Civil War to escape the bloodshed and economic collapse in Confederate Louisiana. After the Civil War, some Louisiana Creole refugees returned to New Orleans and Louisiana.

Between July 28, 1915, and August 1, 1934, the United States occupied Haiti and established colorism and Jim Crow laws. The racism and violence that occurred during the United States' occupation of Haiti inspired black nationalism among Haitians and left a powerful impression on later Haitian politicians. New nationalist ideas in Haiti emphasized African roots and abandoned the promotion of Haiti's colonial Creole heritage.

Haitian politicians such as François "Papa Doc" Duvalier promoted a noirist history of the Haitian Revolution, and emphasized the idea of a heroic black slave uprising against evil white slave masters as an allegory for the Haitian people gaining independence from the American occupational forces, both in the hopes of swaying the opinions and votes of the peasant class (the majority of the Haiti's population), and to instill a strong Afro-centric nationalism into the country.

In 2012, Haiti petitioned to be made a member of the African Union, as it claimed to be sufficiently African. However, in May 2016, the African Union Commission announced, "According to Article 29.1 of the AU's Constitutive Act, only African States can join the African Union." Therefore, "Haiti will not be admitted as a Member State of the African Union."

== Culture ==
=== Creole French Language ===
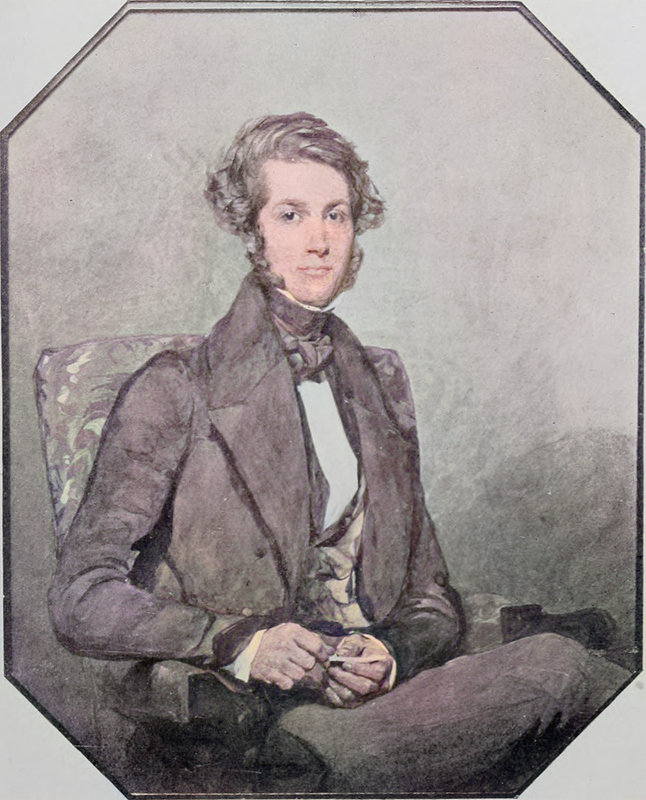
American ornithologist John James Audubon, born Jean-Jacques Rabin Audubon in Les Cayes, Saint-Domingue

Creoles of all classes spoke Creole French. There were different registers of Creole French, a lower and higher register, depending on one's education and social class. Creole French served as a lingua franca throughout the West Indies.

L'Entrepreneur. Mo sorti apprend, Mouché, qué vou té éprouvé domage dan traversée.

Le Capitaine. Ça vrai.

L'Entr. Vou crére qué navire à vou gagné bisoin réparations?

Le C. Ly té carené anvant nou parti, mai coup z'ouragan là mété moué dan cas fair ly bay encor nion radoub.

L'Entr. Ly fair d'iau en pile?

Le C. Primié jours aprés z'orage, nou té fair trente-six pouces par vingt-quatre heurs; mai dan beau tem mo fair yo dégagé ça mo pu, et tancher miyor possible, nou fair à présent necqué treize pouces.

The Entrepreneur. I just learned, sir, that you garnered damages in your crossing.

The Captain. That's true.

The Entrepreneur. Do you believe that your ship needs repair?

The Captain. It careened before we left, but the blow from the hurricane put me in the position of getting it refitted again.

The Entrepreneur. Is it taking on a lot of water?

The Captain. The first days after the storm, we took on thirty six inches in twenty four hours; but in clear weather I made them take as much of it out as I could, and attached it the best we possibly could; we're presently taking on not even thirteen inches.

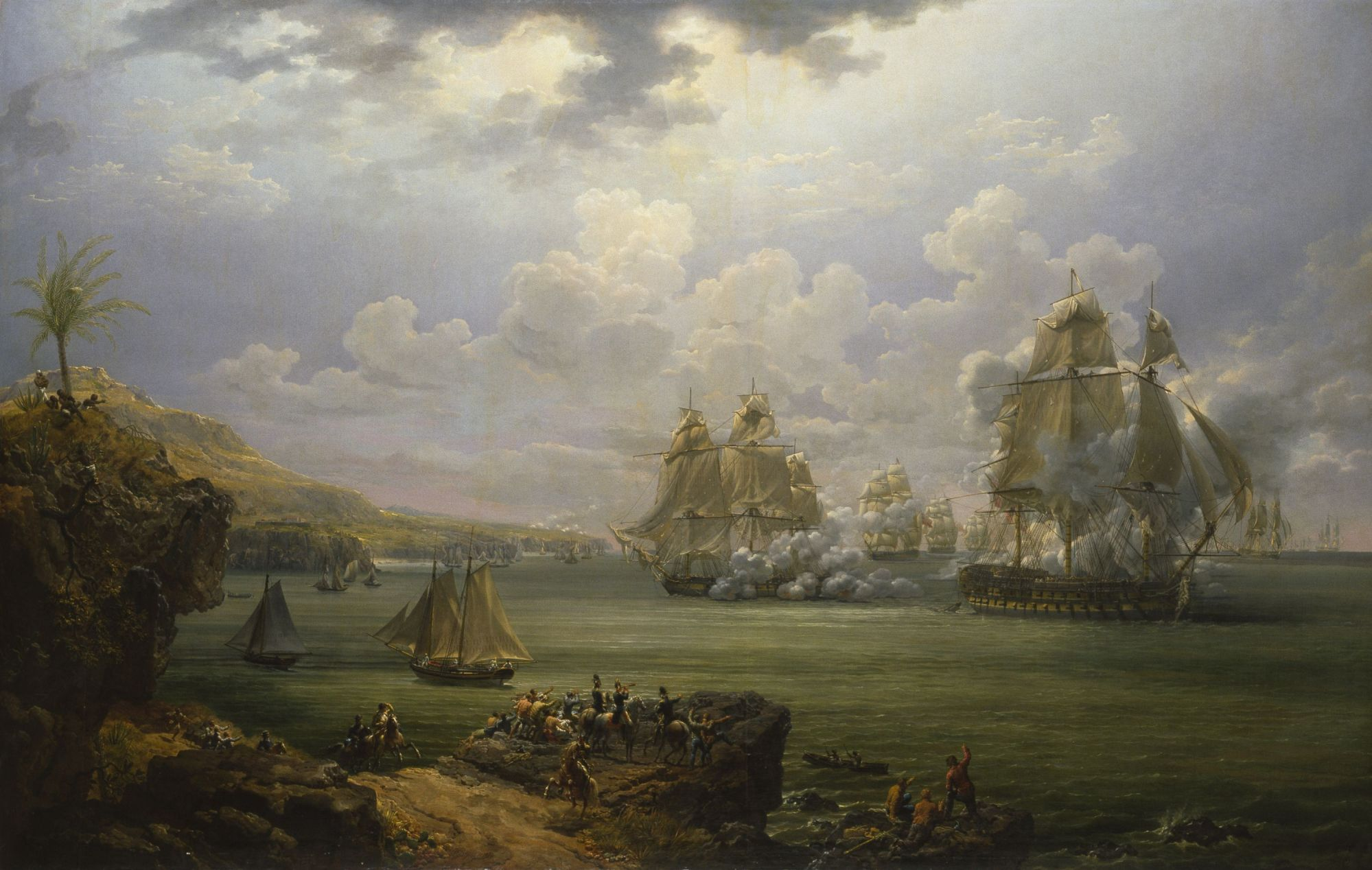
The Blockade of Saint-Domingue, 18 June–6 December 1803. British and Haitian forces attack French forces at Cap-Français

Mad. Wilminton. C'est toi, Jean-Pierre? Hé! d'où viens-tu? Pourquoi cette arme?

Jean-Pierre. Vous pas gagné peur, madame, ça pas pour faire mal fusil-là, ça pitôt pour défendre vous. Moi allé dans ville cherché vous, et maître à moi, madame; mais bien content trouvé vous ici; vous savoir Caraïbe sauvé tribunal?

Mad. Wilminton. Je le sais.

Jean-Pierre. Oui, madame, et moi été avec eux chercher z'autres Caraïbes qui dans montagne, quand nous voir grand l'escadre français qui canoné fort à z'anglais, moi dire comme ça: Z'anglais pas laissé soldats beaucoup dans ville, si nous gagné beaucoup Caraïbes, nous capables pour sauver maître à moi, et blanc Français; mais t'en prie, Madame, vini dans ville. Moi velé taché voir maître pour bail li bon courage.

Mad. Wilminton. Ton maître est sauvé, je viens de le voir.

Jean-Pierre. Li sauvé? Oh! mon bon Dié! mon bon Dié! ta remercie.

Mad. Wilminton. J'entends du bruit: on marche vers ces lieux..... Ah! grand Dieu! c'est le constable avec des soldats.

Jean-Pierre. Nous pas en force pour attaquer eux, vini, madame, vini, moi connais gnon pitit sentier par où constable li pas capable voir nous rentrer dans ville. Vous, camarades, tournez vers montagne cherché z'autres Caraïbes, et vini ici pour delivré bon blanc. Vini, vini, moi conduire vous.

Mad. Wilminton. O ciel! protége-moi!

Madame Wilminton. Is it you, Jean-Pierre? Hey! where are you coming from? Why are you armed?

Jean-Pierre. Don't be afraid, madame, this weapon is not to cause harm, rather it's to defend you. I went into town to find you, and my master, madame; but I am very happy to find you here; did you know that a Carib saved the tribunal?

Madame Wilminton. I know.

Jean-Pierre. Yes, madame, and I came with them to find other Caribs who are in the mountain, when we saw the big French squadron bombard the English fort, I said this: "The English did not leave a lot of soldiers in town, if we gather a lot of Caribs, we can save my master, and the white Frenchmen;" but I beg you, Madame, come into town. I want to try to see master to give him good luck.

Madame Wilminton. Your master is safe, I just saw him.

Jean-Pierre. He's safe? Oh! my goodness! I thank you.

Madame Wilminton. I hear noise: they're coming this way..... Ah! good God! it's the constable with soldiers.

Jean-Pierre. We aren't enough to attack them, come, madame, come, I know a little path where the constable cannot see us reenter the town. You, camarades, return to the mountains and look for other Caribs, and come here to save the good white. Come, come, I will lead you.

Madame Wilminton. Oh heavens! protect me!

The flag of the Empire of Haiti (1804-1806)

Haïti, l'an 1er, 5e, jour de l'indépendance.

Chère maman moi,

Ambassadeurs à nous, partis pour chercher argent France, moi voulé écrire à vous par yo, pour dire vous combien nous contens. Français bons, oublié tout. Papas nous révoltés contre yo, papas nous tués papas yo, fils yo, gérens yo, papas nous brûlées habitations yo. Bagasse, eux veni trouver nous! et dis nous, vous donner trente millions de gourdes à nous et nous laisser Haïti vous? Vous veni acheter sucre, café, indigo à nous? mais vous payer moitié droit à nous. Vous penser chère maman moi, que nous accepté marché yo. Président à nous embrassé bon papa Makau. Yo bu santé roi de France, santé Boyer, santé Christophe, santé Haïti, santé indépendance. Puis yo dansé Balcindé et Bai chi ca colé avec Haïtienes. Moi pas pouvé dire vous combien tout ça noble et beau.

Venir voir fils à vous sur habitation, maman moi, li donné vous cassave, gouillave et pimentade. Li ben content si pouvez mener li blanche france pour épouse. Dis li, si ben heureuse. Nous plus tuer blancs, frères, amis, et camarades à nous.

Fils à vous embrasse vous, chère maman moi.

Congo, Haïtien libre et indépendant, au Trou-Salé.

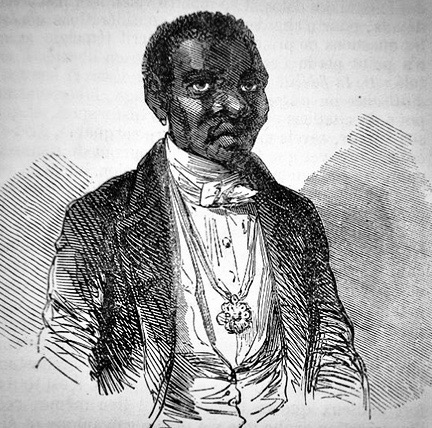
A Haitian planter

Haiti, 1st year, 5th day of independence.

My dear mother,

Our ambassadors left to get money from France, I want to write to you through them, to tell you how much we are happy. The French are good, they forgot everything. Our fathers revolted against them, our fathers killed their fathers, sons, managers, and our fathers burned down their plantations. Well, they came to find us, and told us, "you give thirty million gourdes to us and we'll leave Haiti to you? (And we replied) Will you come buy sugar, coffee, and indigo from us? You will pay only half directly to us." Do you believe my dear mother, that we accepted the deal? Our President hugged the good papa Makau (the French ambassador). They drank to the health of the King of France, to the health of Boyer, to the health of Christophe, to the health of Haiti, to independence. Then they danced Balcindé and Bai chi ca colé with Haitian women. I can't tell you how much all of this is so beautiful and noble.

Come see your son at his plantation, my mother, he will give you cassava, goyava, and pimentade. He will be happy if you can bring him a white Frenchwoman for a wife. Tell her, if you please. We won't kill anymore whites, brothers, friends, and camarades of ours.

Your son hugs you, my dear mother.

Congo, free and independent Haitian, at Trou-Salé.

== See also ==
- Louisiana Creole people
- Haitians
- History of Haiti
- History of Louisiana
