= François Fournier de Pescay =

Haitian physician and surgeon

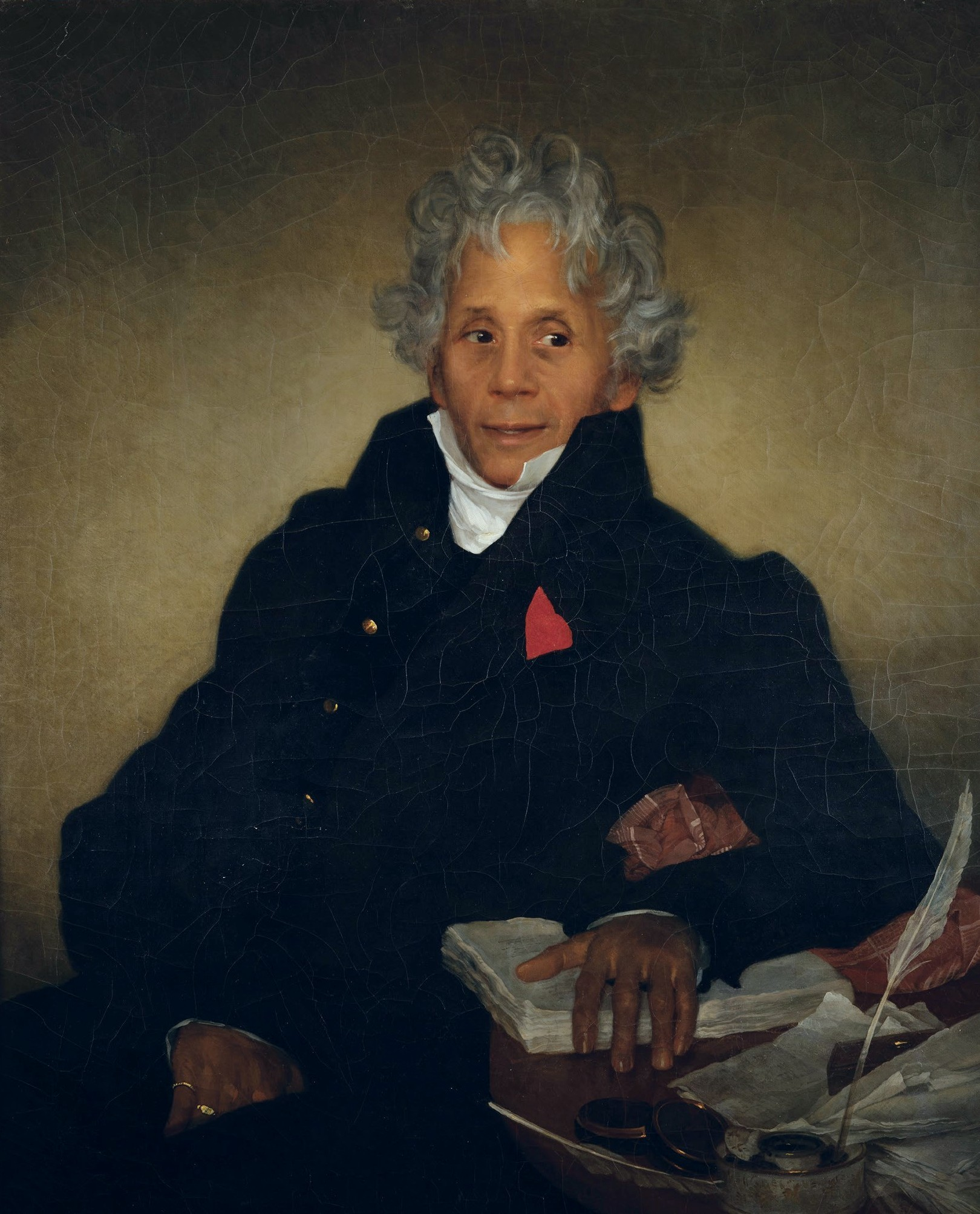
Portrait of François Fournier de Pescay by Augustine Cochet de Saint-Omer, 1831

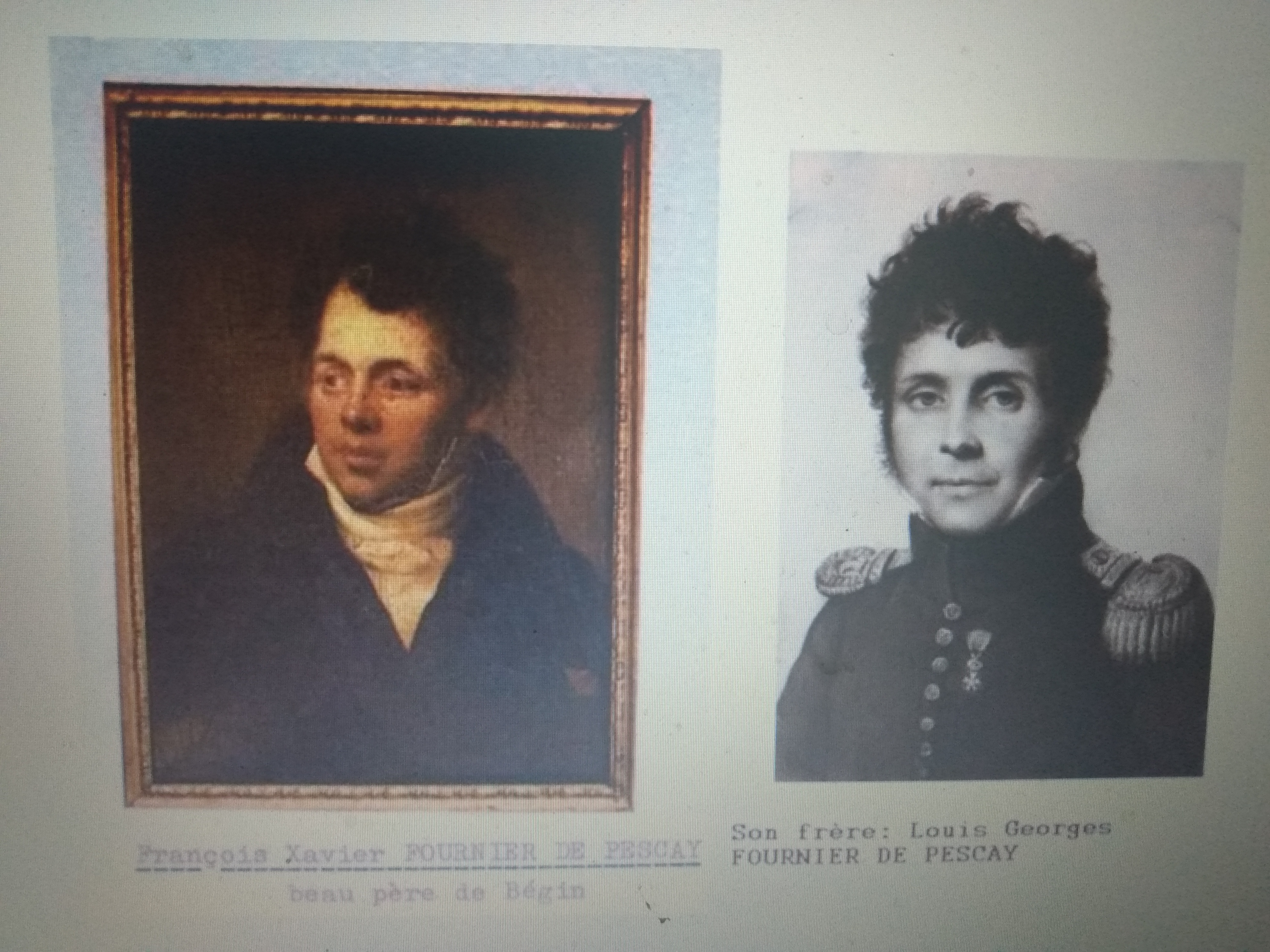

François Fournier de Pescay (born 7 September 1771 – 8 July 1833), was a Haitian medical doctor and surgeon.

== Biography ==
François Fournier de Pescay was born in 1771 in Cap-Français in Saint-Domingue. He was the son of François Pescay, a planter of Saint-Domingue, and a free black woman, Adélaïde Rappau, the first person of color to have practiced medicine and surgery in Europe. He was the first Director of the first University of Haiti (L'Académie d'Haïti).

Fournier de Pescay began as a surgeon and doctor in 1792 in the revolutionary armies. In 1799, he left the army and moved to Brussels where he worked, and professed helped found the Brussels Medical Society for which he later became Secretary-General.

In 1806, Fournier de Pescay was recalled in the Napoleonic army as a surgeon of the Imperial Guard, an elite unit created in 1806 by Napoleon I and for young people of the most aristocratic families of the old regime.

In 1808, he was seconded to the Castle Valençay as personal physician to the Prince of Asturias (future Ferdinand VII of Spain) that Napoleon, having undertaken to conquer Spain to put his brother Joseph Bonaparte on the throne, holding prisoner. While in Valencay, Fournier de Pescay devoted his leisure to literature and published several medical books. He was then appointed Secretary of the Board of Health of hosts.

This is Louis XVIII who decorated it from the Legion of Honour. He retained his position at the Health Board until 1823, when he sailed for Haiti with his family, occupying National High School as Director of Port-au-Prince in 1824, professor of medicine and surgery Port-au-Prince and Inspector General of the Health Department. Returning to Paris in 1828, he was forced to retire to the south of France for health reasons and died near Pau. While in Haiti, he published the regulations of the "Academy of Haiti" adding Law and Medicine to the curriculum of this first Haitian University. However, following certain disappointments especially with Boyer, the Haitian president with whom he fell out, he returned to France in 1828 undermined by illness.

Apart from many books related to medicine, we owe him several translations, including that of "Troubadour or Old Loves", Paris, 1812, 5 songs and poem in Romance language, Hugues de Xentrales.
