= Jacques de Falaise =

French quarryman who became famous for his ingestion skills (1754–1825)

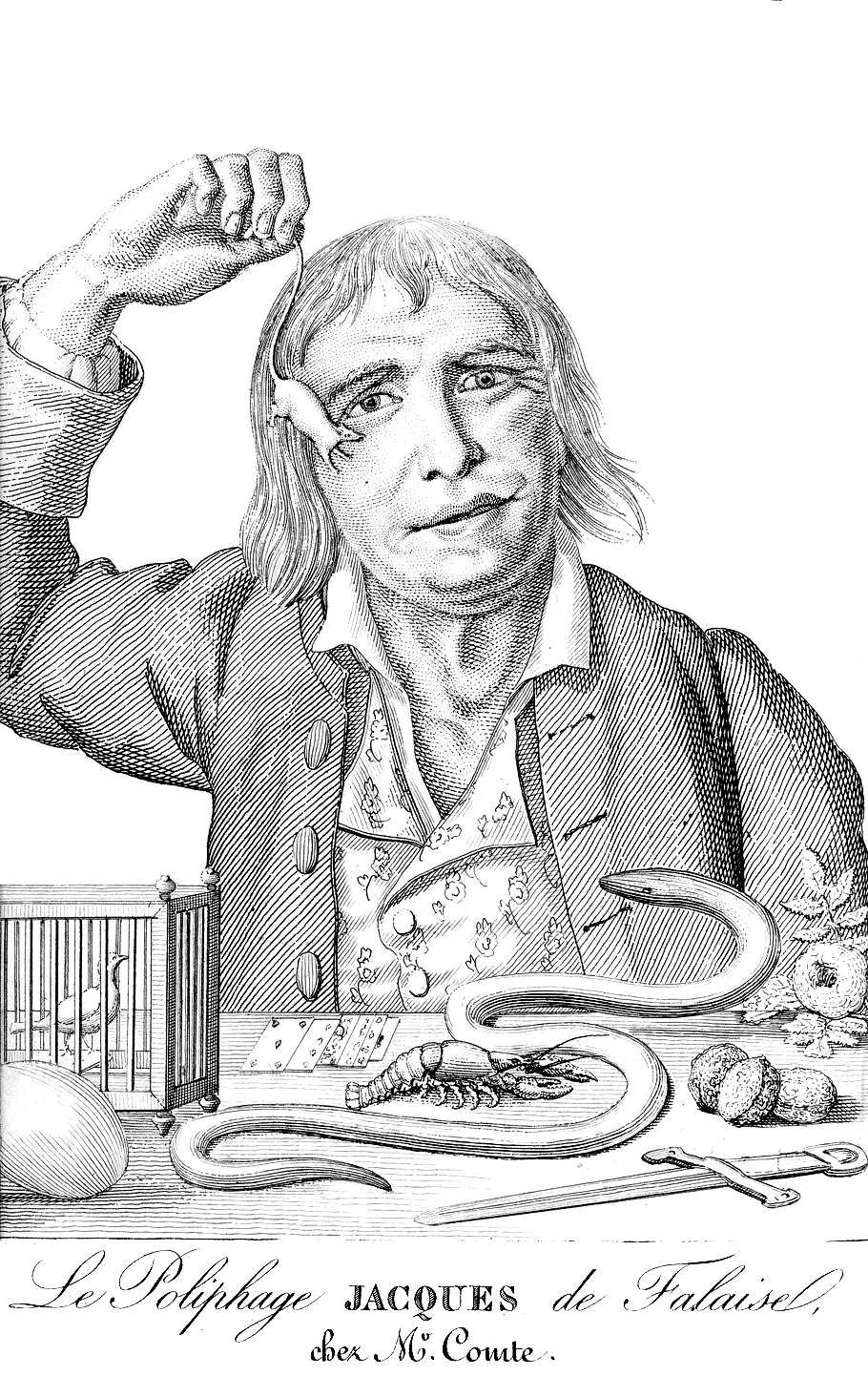
- Le poliphage Jacques de Falaise chez M. Comte, anonymous engraving from 1819. Jacques de Falaise, seated at a table, holds a live mouse in one hand. In front of him, a bird in a cage, an eel, a crayfish, a flower, nuts, playing cards and a sword.
- Born: Jacques Simon; 1754; Falaise, France
- Died: 30 March 1825 (aged 70-71); Paris, France
- Occupations: Quarryman, street performer
- Known for: Polyphagia (Note: The term polyphage is "derived from πολυς, numerous, and φαγω, I eat"; Pierre-François Percy and Charles Nicolas Laurent "express by this name the eaters by profession, those gluttons whom nothing can satiate, and who, not very delicate about the choice of dishes, always find them good enough if they are abundant enough to satisfy their voracity. (Percy, Pierre-François; Laurent, Charles Nicolas (1820). "Polyphage". Dictionnaire des sciences médicales. Panckouche. p. 256.))

Jacques de Falaise (stage name of Jacques Simon; 1754 – 30 March 1825) was a French quarryman who became famous in the early 19th century for his ingestion skills.

First hired by conjurer Louis Comte at his Paris theater in 1816, he became famous for a few years for his "polyphagic experiments", during which he ingested nuts, pipes, unshelled hard-boiled eggs, flowers with their stems, watches, and live animals such as mice, sparrows, eels, and crayfish. Forced to stop his exploits by several bouts of gastroenteritis, he died by suicide in 1825. His autopsy was the subject of a memoir widely circulated in Europe, which concluded that Jacques de Falaise was not endowed with exceptional digestive organs, and that he indulged in his exercises out of a desire to shine, rather than a depraved appetite. He is considered the "ancestor" of circus "merycists".

== Biography ==
=== Montmartre maneuver ===
Jacques Simon was born in 1754 in Baumière, Normandy, on the banks of the river Ante, near Falaise, (Note: The editor of Les Derniers Contes de Charles-Philippe de Chennevières-Pointel, known as Jean de Falaise, humorously notes that "The town of Falaise has the glory of having produced a number of beings of monstrous configuration, either externally or internally. To mention only the best-known, these two who, at the time of the Empire, showed themselves as albinos in the Passage Delorme in Paris, and of the same period, was the famous Jacques de Falaise, who swallowed, with incomparable ease, rats, swords, vipers, flaming guts, and who, like all creators of a genre, has not been surpassed by any imitator; finally, and most recently, that marvellous child from Falaise, who ran all over the kingdom, and whose four limbs offered phenomenal extremities." (Chennevières-Pointel, Charles-Philippe de (1860). Les Derniers contes de Jean de Falaise. Poulet-Malassis et de Broise. p. 103.)) from which he derived his nickname "Jacques de Falaise". Almost nothing is known about the first sixty years of his life, other than that he worked as a quarryman in the plaster quarries of Montmartre, a trade that enabled him to develop "very considerable muscular strength" and "robust health", yet he never "felt the need to satisfy his hunger with disgusting or bizarre objects".

The circumstances in which he became aware of his extraordinary abilities are the subject of divergent accounts. According to the 1820 Notice devoted to him by an anonymous author, it happened, on an unspecified date, that, as a game, he hid a bride's chain and locket in his mouth, then, in order not to be discovered, he swallowed them and declared: "Vous voyais ben que je n'lons point" ("You could see that I don't have anything"). According to doctor Beaudé's Mémoire, who performed an autopsy on Jacques Simon in 1825, he was challenged one day in a cabaret to swallow the owner's canary, "despite the strong protests of the bird's owner", and swallowed it in one go, which surprised him the most, declaring: "I didn't think I'd swallow it at all, and I was quite surprised to see it go down so easily".

Having discovered this curious talent, Jacques Simon repeated the experiment several times, swallowing "corks and hard-boiled eggs with their shells", "keys, crosses, rings", then "live animals, which passed through with the same ease". Due to lack of training, however, he nearly "strangled himself at the market, trying to swallow a live eel".

=== Then, a freak show ===
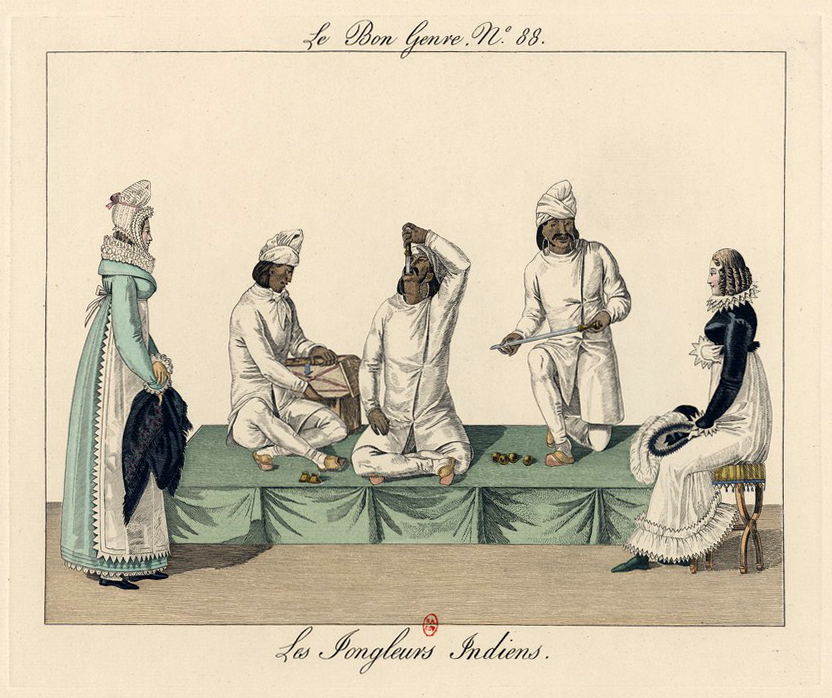
Les Jongleurs indiens, engraving by Georges-Jacques Gatine based on an anonymous drawing. Le Bon Genre series (1816). "The saber, which one of these jugglers swallows, is one inch [2.54 cm] wide and eighteen [45.72 cm] long. This trick, or rather experiment, (Note: In the language of the time, magic tricks were "experiments", magicians were "physicists" and their show was "amusing physics". (Metzner, Paul (1998). Crescendo of the Virtuoso: Spectacle, Skill, and Self-promotion in Paris During the Age of Revolution. University of California Press. p. 199. ISBN 9780520206847.)) which we see performed with ever-new surprise and awe, is proof of the power of long habit"

Jacques Simon's artistic career was an indirect consequence of the success of a trio of Indian jugglers who, "after having won the admiration of London", performed in Paris, rue de Castiglione, during the winter of 1815–1816. In addition to escamotage and juggling, their sword-swallowing act was particularly noteworthy. According to Anglès's Almanach critique et littéraire de Paris, this trick "consisted on slowly introducing a sword into the esophagus as far as the stomach, and perhaps even into the cavity of this viscera, a well-polished iron blade, the width of which was about half an inch [1.27 cm] at its tip, then increased little by little; so that it was at least an inch [2.54 cm]. This blade was a line and a half thick [3 mm]; all the angles were rounded with great care, and the Indian would push it into his gullet with great care, after first coating it with saliva and passing it over his tongue".

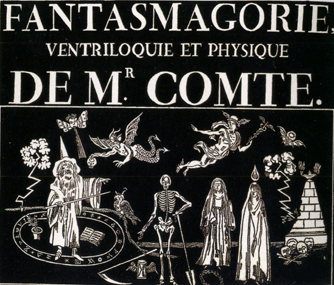
Fantasmagorie ventriloquie et physique de Mr Comte. Advertising poster for the Comte Theatre. (Note: In the language of the time, magic tricks were "experiments", magicians were "physicists" and their show was "amusing physics". (Metzner, Paul (1998). Crescendo of the Virtuoso: Spectacle, Skill, and Self-promotion in Paris During the Age of Revolution. University of California Press. p. 199. ISBN 9780520206847.))

Swiss-born Louis Comte was a famous magician and ventriloquist, known as the "king's physicist" for having charmed Louis XVIII with his "experiments" in "amusing physics". He gave a show of "amusing magic and phantasmagoria" in a small "theater", then located in a cellar of the Hôtel des Fermes, rue de Grenelle-Saint-Honoré (now rue Jean-Jacques-Rousseau). The prestidigitator was also a shrewd businessman, always on the lookout for attractions that would serve "as an interlude to goblet tricks and ventriloquist illusions" and helped make his theater "an inexhaustible reservoir of tricks and juggling of all kinds".

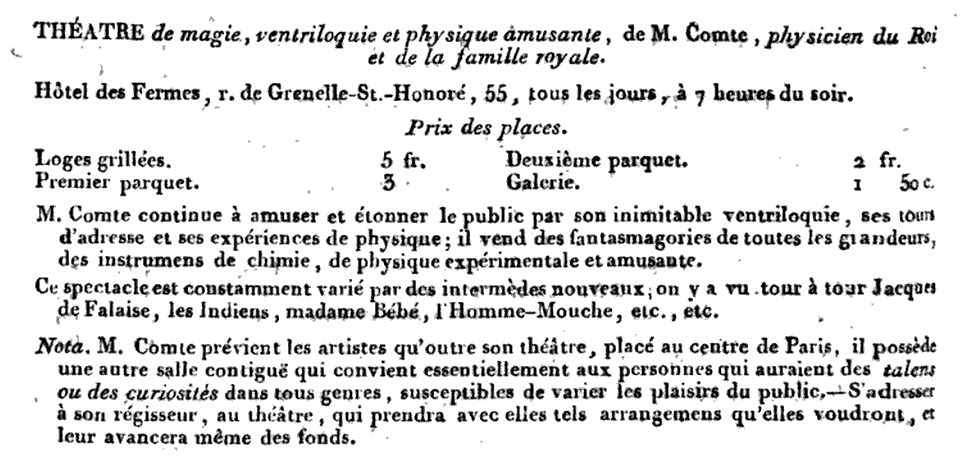
Advertisement for the Comte theater (1820), referring to Jacques de Falaise

Having heard of the Montmartre quarryman's talents, he saw an opportunity to capitalize on the vogue for Indian jugglers, and had him approached by his steward, a certain Mr. Godin, who "made the Indian sword shine" in the worker's eyes and aroused in him "a love of glory". This new profession seemed to Jacques to be much preferable to the one he had been practicing, and he soon resolved not to return to the quarries of Montmartre, having "no other regret than to have so long disregarded the great views that Providence had for him". English traveler Stephen Weston (Note: British clergyman Stephen Weston had a devotion to Paris. He witnessed the events of the Revolution in 1791 and 1792, but fled the French capital in mid-August of the latter year, considering it a city where one could "be killed by mistake or for six pounds". After the Treaty of Amiens in 1802, he hurried back, and during the summer of 1829, when he was in his eighties, he could be seen there daily at the theater and other places of amusement. Courtney, William Prideaux (1899). "Weston, Stephen (1747-1830)" . Dictionary of National Biography. Vol. 60. pp. 372–374.) summed up Jacques's joy by pastiching a tirade by Francaleu in La Métromanie:

In my belly one fine day this talent was found,
And I was sixty years old when it happened to me.

Louis Comte's recruitment of Jacques Simon came with leonine conditions, as he agreed, "for 400 francs a year, food and clothing, to swallow, for five years, and in public, any objects presented to him".

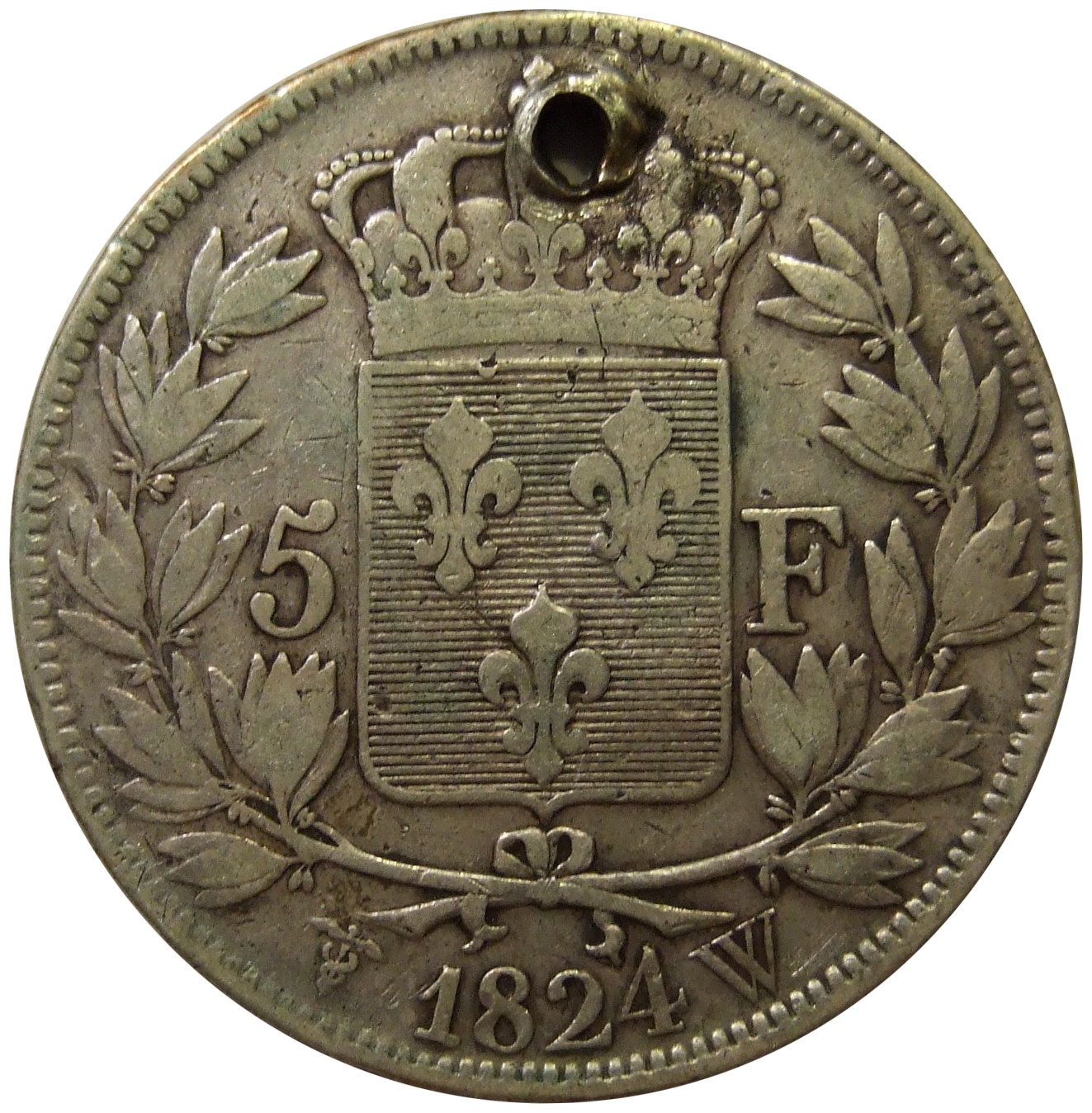
The five-franc silver coin measured 37 mm in diameter and weighed 25 g. By swallowing around 50 of these coins in one go, Jacques de Falaise ingested around 1.25 kg of silver, at the cost of a "dangerous intestinal inflammation".

After "a few weeks of practice under the eyes of his new boss", Jacques Simon made his debut at the Théâtre Comte in June 1816, under the stage name of "Jacques de Falaise", to which was quickly added the sonorous epithet of "polyphage", (Note: The term polyphage is "derived from πολυς, numerous, and φαγω, I eat"; Pierre-François Percy and Charles Nicolas Laurent "express by this name the eaters by profession, those gluttons whom nothing can satiate, and who, not very delicate about the choice of dishes, always find them good enough if they are abundant enough to satisfy their voracity. (Percy, Pierre-François; Laurent, Charles Nicolas (1820). "Polyphage". Dictionnaire des sciences médicales. Panckouche. p. 256.)) a learned word for "swallowing everything", as one work of the period put it, at the risk of being "trivial", to put himself "within the reach of all readers". To the amazement of the audience, he swallowed for a quarter of an hour, "very resolutely" and "with an air of bliss painted on his face", whole potatoes or walnuts, unshelled eggs, a pipe bowl, small shot glasses, a watch with its chain, three cards rolled together, which he " swallowed without tearing them or crushing them with his teeth", a rose, "with its leaves, its long stem, and its thorns", but also live animals, such as a sparrow, a white mouse, a frog, a crayfish, an eel or a snake, never vomiting what he ingested in this way. He readily responded to audience challenges, agreeing to repeat his "experiments" for spectators who arrived late, swallowing an English spectator's watch "as well as the chain and three charms hanging from it", or coins. On one occasion, "he had to swallow 300 francs in 5-franc coins, as the poster had announced; but, as by a fair convention, everything that passed through the stomach of our polyphagus (Note: The term polyphage is "derived from πολυς, numerous, and φαγω, I eat"; Pierre-François Percy and Charles Nicolas Laurent "express by this name the eaters by profession, those gluttons whom nothing can satiate, and who, not very delicate about the choice of dishes, always find them good enough if they are abundant enough to satisfy their voracity. (Percy, Pierre-François; Laurent, Charles Nicolas (1820). "Polyphage". Dictionnaire des sciences médicales. Panckouche. p. 256.)) became his property, the head of the establishment had only 150 francs available for this purpose, inviting the public to provide the rest, if they wanted to witness the show he had been announced. Twenty or so coins were thrown at him, and he swallowed them all; and if he didn't ingest the advertised 300 francs into his stomach, it was because a crowd of spectators, fearing the consequences of this kind of exercise, wouldn't allow it. The pain caused by the weight and movement of these fifty pieces was so severe that Jacques de Falaise was obliged to clasp his stomach with a wide belt, which he didn't leave until he had passed all the pieces in his stool".

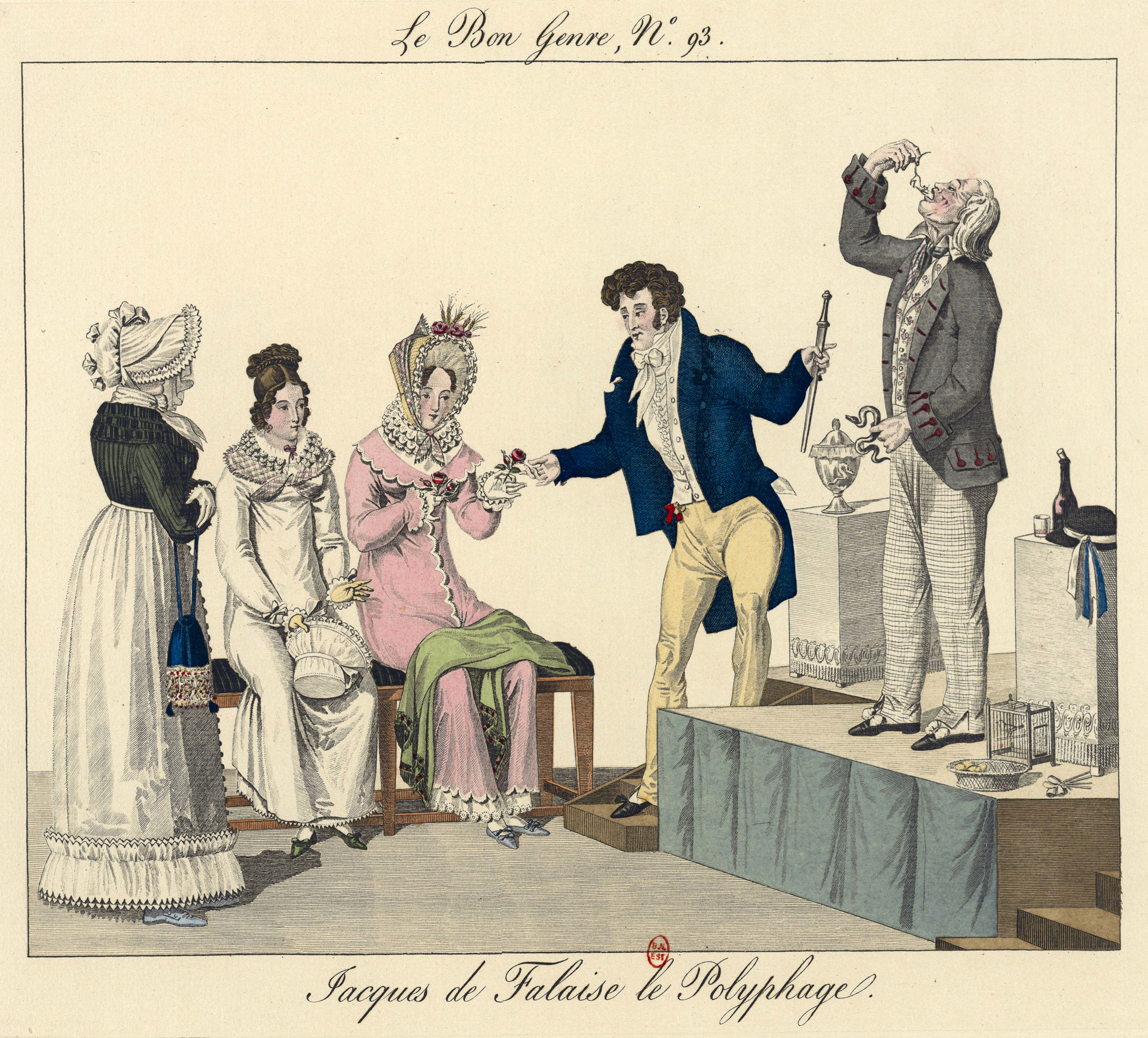
Print from the Le Bon Genre series, drawn by Louis-Marie Lanté, 1816. Jacques de Falaise inserts a live mouse into his mouth with his right hand, and holds a live eel in his left. A lady in the audience hands him a rose, complete with stem and leaves.

The highlight of his show was a repeat of the Indian jugglers' sword-swallowing trick. "Without preparation, very lightly, and without giving the slightest sign of suffering", he dipped into the gullet "instead of the eleven or twelve inches [30 to 32.5 cm] that the Indians inserted", "thirteen to fourteen inches [35 to 38 cm] of a polished steel blade, weighing one pound, eighteen inches [49 cm] long, three lines thick [7 mm], and one inch [2.7 cm] wide". He also did not coat the sword with saliva, unlike the Indians who, "more experienced than him, were more afraid of hurting themselves" and operated "without preparation", "more lightly [than them], with less precaution, and without giving the same signs of suffering". The columnists, with a touch of cockiness, pointed out that his performance surpassed that of his predecessors. For the Mercure de France, "we had at home, in Montmartre, even better than the Indian jugglers without suspecting it", while the Journal de Paris argued that "the Indian jugglers left in time not to see their glory eclipsed by that of a good Norman". Étienne de Jouy, who referred to him as the "Grand-gousier", found him "no less astonishing" than the Swiss ventriloquist, and the Journal de Paris noted, in the same vein, that "this was the most extraordinary piece in M. Comte's Spectacle, and it was not one of the latter's least clever tricks to have included this universal swallower among the curiosities that drew crowds to his home".

It seems that every aspect of Jacques's performance was of interest to the public. The jokers "spread the rumor that he had to swallow a cat to look for the mouse in his stomach, and that, if the cat took too long to come back, he had a dog ready to go get it and bring it back". The Journal des débats politiques et littéraires revealed that "after each solid he swallowed, Jacques rather hastily drank a small dose, always about the same, of a wine said to have been prepared. He seemed to make no effort to kill living animals in his mouth, and boasted that he could feel them stirring in his stomach". Describing Jacques as an "homophagus", (Note: According to the Encyclopédie, an omophage, or homophage, is someone who eats raw flesh. For Joseph Favre, the "most relentless" omophagous "are called polyphagous". (Joseph, Favre (1905). Dictionnaire universel de cuisine pratique. p. 1146, t. 3.) Jean-Baptiste Félix Descuret qualifies: "The anthropophagus would eat you a man; the omophagus, if need be, would swallow him whole, and the polyphagus, fully clothed ". (Descuret, Jean-Baptiste Félix (1841). La médecine des passions: ou, Les passions considérées dans leurs rapports avec les maladies, les lois et la religion (in French). Béchet Jeune et Labé. pp. 345–346.)) Pierre-François Percy and Charles Nicolas Laurent added that "his face showed no trace of painful digestion; it was pale and very wrinkled; he ate a pound of cooked meat at each of his meals, and drank two bottles of wine. He pretended to have a horror of raw flesh, and to be able to swallow only live animals. It is said to excrete solid bodies from below, the debris of birds and mice within twenty-four hours, and it was not until the third day that the undigested portions of eels came out. Its excrement was extremely fetid."

They also observed that "it made no effort, or even any movement, to kill live animals in its mouth", a detail contradicted by Dr. Beaudé. According to the latter, "on one occasion, an eel went up through the oesophagus, to the posterior opening of the nasal cavity, and caused great pain there by the efforts it made to find a way out; finally, it entered the back of the mouth. Our juggler wouldn't let it out, as the scene was taking place in public, so he broke it head between his teeth and swallowed it again. From then on," he said, "he got into the habit of quickly crushing the heads of the animals he had to swallow with his molar teeth".

=== End of career ===
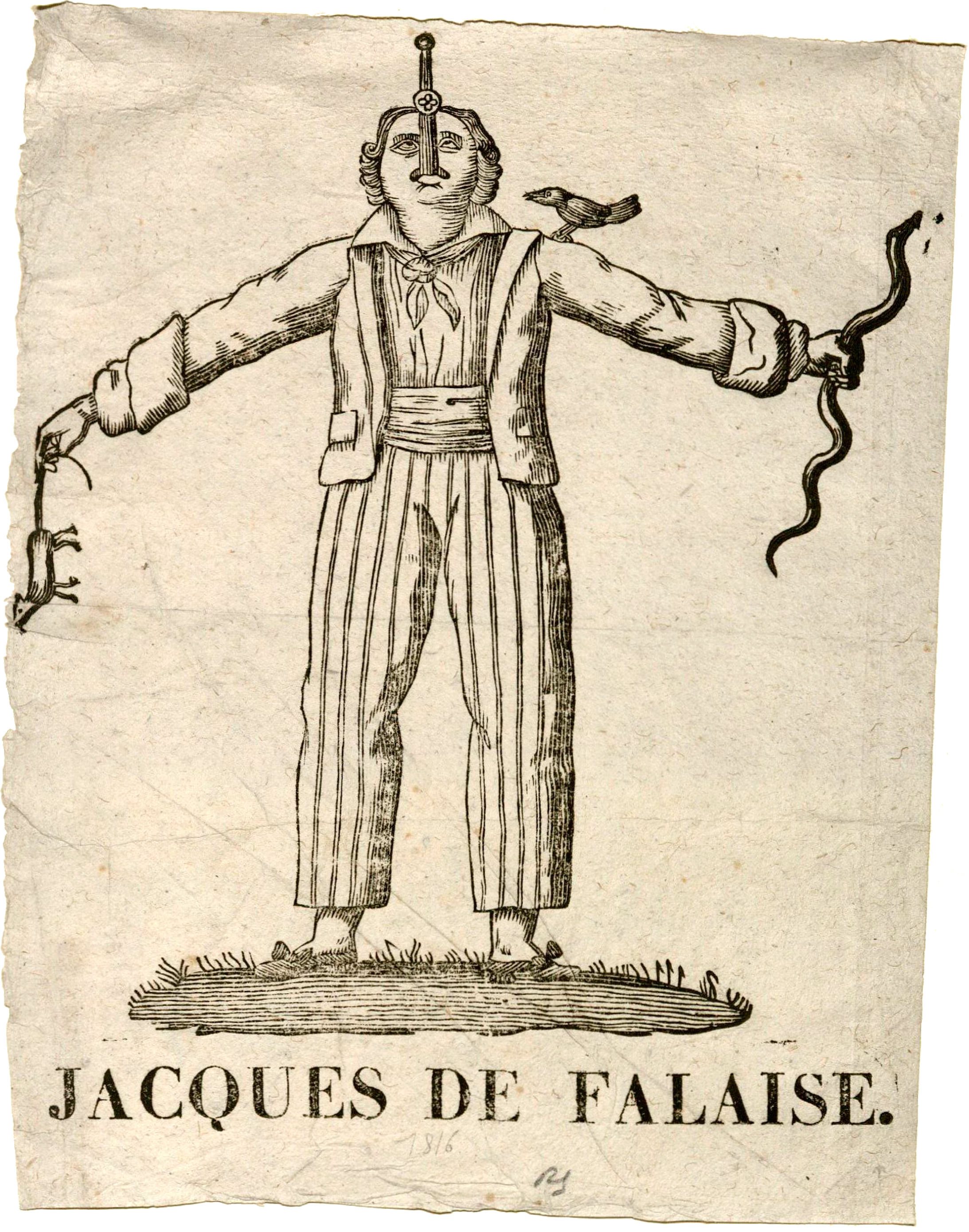
Jacques de Falaise holding a sword in his mouth, a mouse in one hand, an eel in the other, a bird perched on his shoulder. Wood engraving, c. 1816.

In August 1816, Jacques gave his last performance at the Théâtre Comte. Le Constitutionnel announced that he was "going to repeat his experiments in Lyon, Bordeaux and then London". He was in Lyon in September, where he gave seven performances at the Théâtre des Célestins, always accompanied by his stage manager Godin. The front page of the Journal politique et littéraire du département du Rhône reported that the famous Jacques de Falaise, "passing through our city on his way to Marseille, did not deny in his experiments the extraordinary things that all the Paris newspapers had told us about this phenomenon of nature". At the end of September, Le Constitutionnel reported, not without irony, that the "polyphagous" was in Marseille, where he swallowed snakes (Note: The confusion between eels and snakes, reputed to be inedible, is said to be the origin of the expression snake-swallower. (Duneton, Claude (2014). La Puce à l'oreille: Anthologie des expressions populaires avec leur origine (in French). Le Livre de Poche. p. 106. ISBN 9782253173847.) In "a page of anthology where myth abounds", (Guilbert, Françoise (1992). Le pouvoir sanitaire : essai sur la normalisation hygiénique (Thèse pour le doctorat de droit) (in French). Université Robert Schuman. p. 10.) Jean-Baptiste Félix Descuret maintained that Jacques de Falaise, like Tarrare, "swallowed snakes more easily" (Descuret, Jean-Baptiste Félix (1841). La médecine des passions: ou, Les passions considérées dans leurs rapports avec les maladies, les lois et la religion (in French). Béchet Jeune et Labé. pp. 345–346.) than eels.) and "didn't earn enough to feed on more delicious dishes". The paper had no doubt, therefore, "that he would hasten back to the capital", especially as an impostor was performing at the Saint-Cloud fair, pretending to be him.

Between 1818 and 1821, Jacques Simon performed regularly in Paris, sometimes at Madame Saqui's theater and more often again at the Théâtre Comte, but also in the provinces. Paul Ginisty, in a biography of Madame Saqui dating from the early 20th century, suggested that Jacques's enthusiasm was not quite the same as in his early days: "with a commanding vivacity, [he] swallowed or pretended to swallow everything the public offered him".

His "polyphagic experiments", sometimes aggravated by accidents such as the dislodging of a blade which "having separated from the handle, remained in the oesophagus, through which it passed", deteriorated his health. He was admitted for the first time to the Beaujon hospital, where he was treated for several months for gastroenteritis. When he was discharged, he resumed his "polyphagous" rounds, "despite the express wish of the doctors who had treated him". In Bordeaux, the theater's cashier absconded with Jacques's takings and savings, amounting to eight thousand francs. The grief of this loss and the abuse of his stomach led to a further deterioration in his health: he was again treated at the Beaujon hospital for gastroenteritis, this time aggravated, and underwent a long and painful convalescence. He gave up his art and accepted a position as a hospital orderly. He carried out his new duties for almost two years, engaging "with great courage in the hardest work, although his mood always remained sombre and gloomy". On the morning of 30 March 1825, "having spent the whole of the previous evening at the cabaret", he was found hanged in the cellar where he was supposed to be sawing wood. Thomas de Troisvèvre, one of the doctors who performed his autopsy, attributed the suicide to "prolonged drunkenness".

== Medical analysis ==
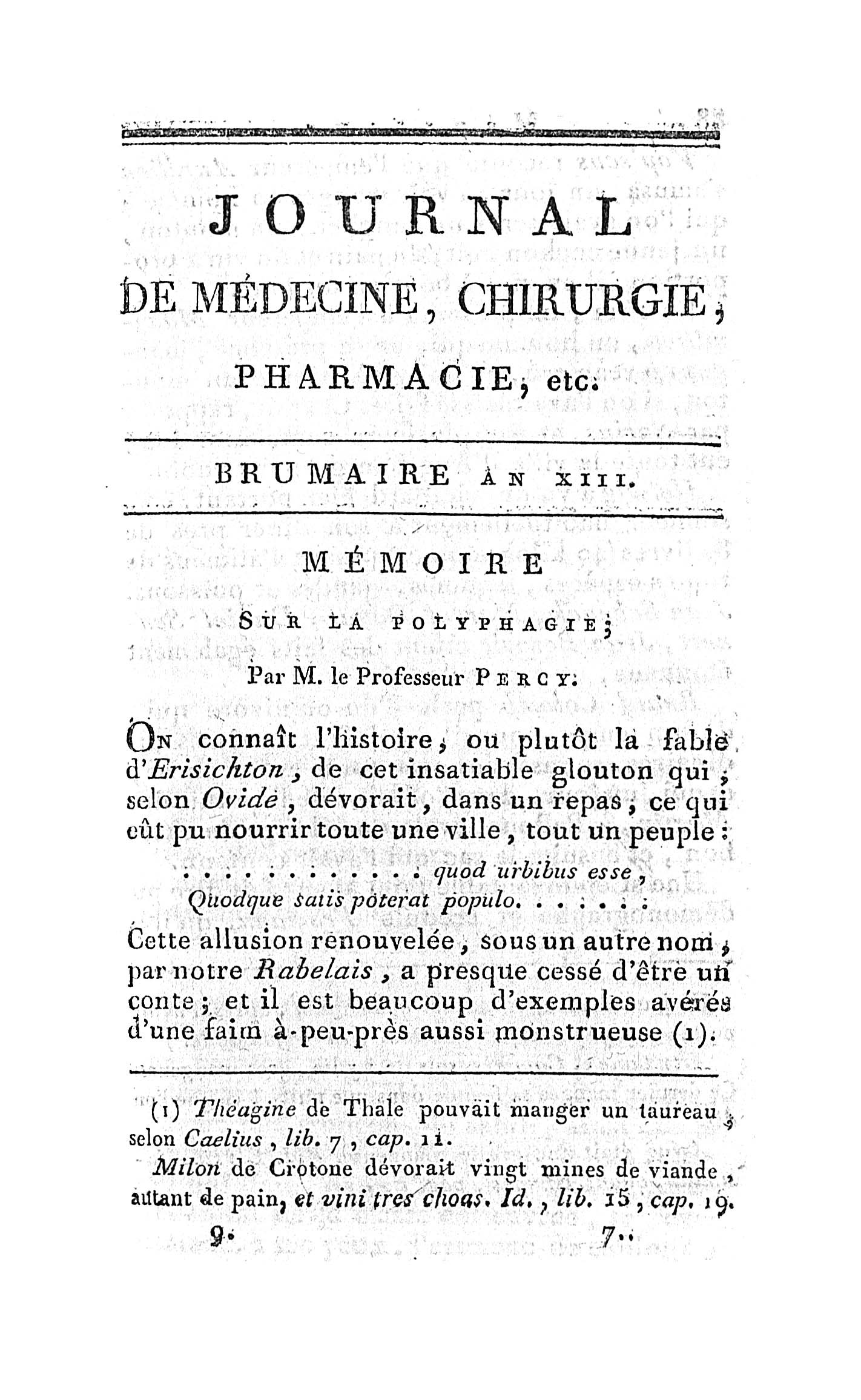
Mémoire sur la polyphagie, Pierre-François Percy, 1805

=== Polyphagia, a poorly-explained symptom ===
The first medical use of the French term polyphage, translated from the Latin polyphagus, (Note: The Latin word polyphagus is attested by Suetonius, but is a hapax in Classical Latin, prompting Robert Littman to suggest translating it as crocodile. (Littman, Robert J. (1976). "The Meaning of Polyphagus". The American Journal of Philology. 97 (4): 369. doi:10.2307/294095. JSTOR 294095.) The term is used by Suetonius to designate Arpocras, an Egyptian or Alexandrian contemporary of Nero who "ate a cooked boar, a live chicken with its feathers, a hundred eggs, a hundred pine cones, nails, broken glass, the bristles of a palm broom, four towels, a suckling pig, an armful of hay, and seemed to be always hungry". (Baldwin, Barry (1977). "Polyphagus: Glutton or Crocodile?". The American Journal of Philology. 98 (4): 406–409. doi:10.2307/293803. JSTOR 293803. & John, Alison (2010). "Decoding the Past: Latin Palaeography and the Manuscript Tradition" (PDF). University of Ottawa. Archived from the original (PDF) on 20 December 2016.) This learned word was used in several medical essays in the 18th century, where it was used alongside allotriophagus (eater of inedible food) and lithophagus (eater of stones). (Boemer, Geor Rudolf (1757). De polyphago et allotriophago Wittebergensi (in Latin). Gerdes. & Vogel, Samuel Gottlieb (1771). De polyphago et lithophago Ilfeldae nuper mortuo ac dissecto commendatio historico-medica (in Latin). Rosenbusch.)) is attributed to Pierre-François Percy, in his 1805 Mémoire sur Tarrare, a famous "living abyss" with "enormous needs" who "went to butcheries and out-of-the-way places, to compete with dogs and wolves for their vile pasture". In the early 19th century, however, the term coexisted with "omophagia", or "homophagia" as Pierre-François Percy and Charles Nicolas Laurent spelled it in the Dictionnaire des sciences médicales edited by Panckoucke—to which the article "Polyphage", also signed by them, referred—and "cynorexia" or canine hunger.

As Tarrare had died of "purulent and infectious diarrhea, announcing a general suppuration of the abdominal viscera", there was some hesitation about performing an autopsy, but Dr. Tessier "braving the disgust and danger of such an autopsy, decided to investigate, which only resulted in showing him putrefied entrails, bathed in pus, blended together, with no trace of foreign matter", a liver "excessively large, without consistency, and in a state of putrefaction", a gallbladder of equally considerable volume, and a stomach "flaccid and strewn with ulcerous plaques, covered almost the entire lower abdominal region". In the absence of more precise autopsy data, Percy limited himself to a semiology of Tarrare's behavior, without offering an explanation for the symptoms observed. More generally, he concluded that they "still had not satisfactorily explained the cause of bulimia, nor that of these morbid hungers, these bizarre appetites", even though anatomical examination could explain certain cases of polyphagia and open "the field to conjectures and probabilities in analogous species".

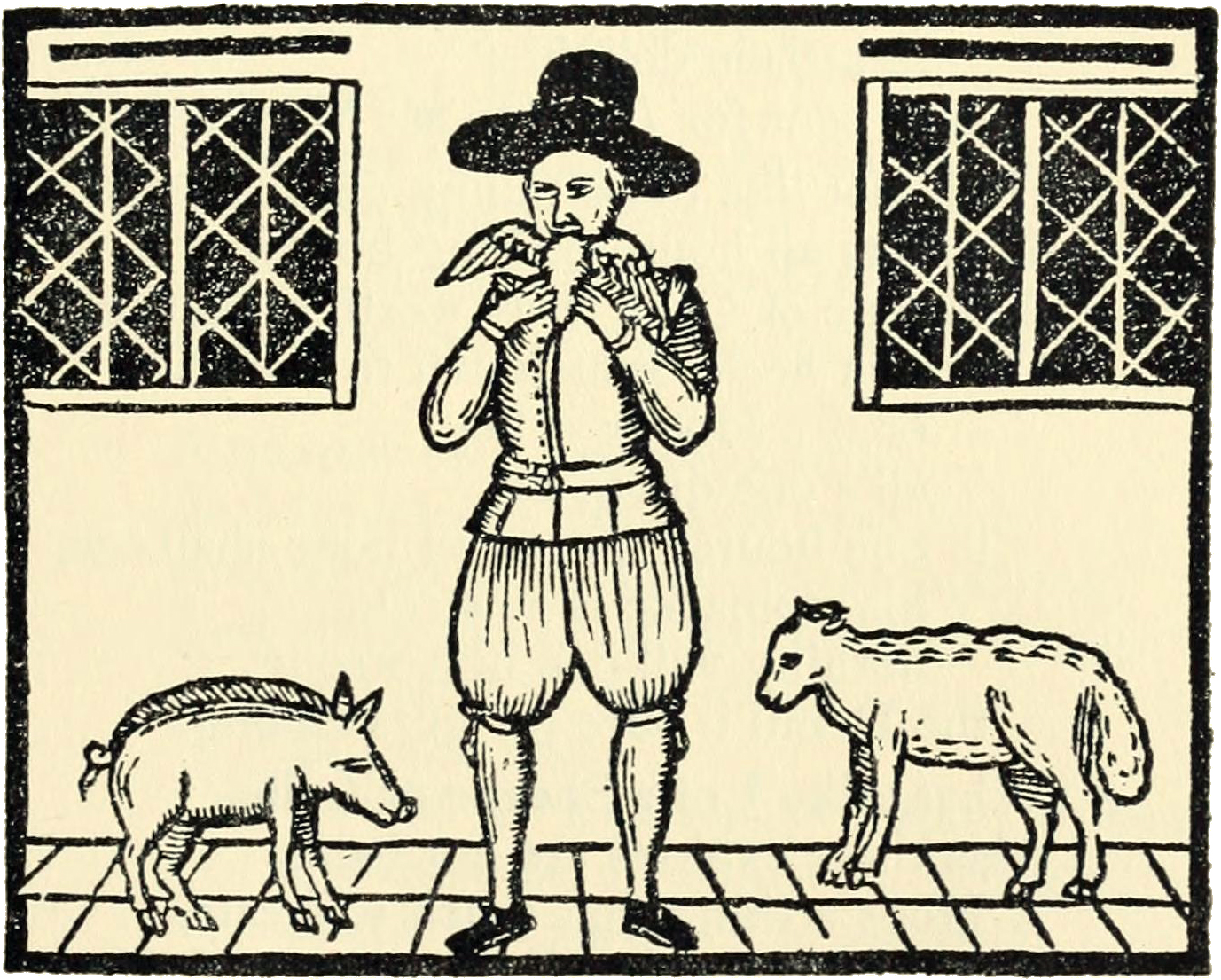
Nicholas Wood, a seventeenth-century English polyphagist of whom the poet John Taylor became both cantor and impresario

In 1811, François-Joseph Double, in his Séméiologie, distinguished polyphagie from pica, considering that hunger could be "depraved" either "when the taste attached itself to one or two strange things, which was pica and malacia; or when it embraced a very large number of them, which was polyphagie".

In 1827, Dr. Ramon, who penned the article "Polyphagia" in the Encyclopédie méthodique, felt that this term was preferable to omophagia for describing a disease characterized by eating a lot of everything. According to this author, "polyphagia was related sometimes to a particular conformation of the digestive organs, sometimes to inflammatory irritation of the stomach, sometimes to the presence of worms in the intestinal canal, and sometimes to nervous irritation". But in 1839, the English doctor John Gideon Millingen was more cautious about explaining such unusual phenomena: he pointed out that the nature of the digestive process was still uncertain, and felt that "neither physiological experiments carried out while the subjects were alive, nor anatomical investigations carried out after death, had so far made it possible to form an opinion".

To explain cases such as those of Tarrare or Charles Domery, (Note: Charles Domery, another famous polyphagus, ate in one day, under medical supervision, 4 pounds of raw cow's teat, 10 pounds of raw beef and 2 pounds of candle. (Wilson, G. H. (1807). The eccentric mirror. Vol. 2. J. Cundee. p. 29.) He consumed four to five pounds of grass a day when meat ran short, and is said to have devoured 174 cats in one year. (de Curzon, Alfred (July 1924). "Les Français en Angleterre". La Nouvelle Revue (in French). & Corry, John; Troughton, Thomas (1810). W. Robinson (ed.). he history of Liverpool: from the earliest authenticated period down to the present times. . p. 227.)) contemporary medicine would rather point to a disorder of the hypothalamus or amygdala. Jan Bondeson noted, however, that "no cases even moderately resembling those of Tarrare and Domery were published in the annals of modern neurology, and it was therefore impossible to determine their correct diagnosis", while adding that the case of Jacques de Falaise was different: according to him, the latter and Bijoux (Note: According to the Dictionnaire des sciences médicales, Bijoux was a menagerie boy at the Jardin des plantes, who "had the rather original habit of classifying animals according to the shape of their excrement", who was once seen "devouring the body of a lion that had died of illness" and who died of "indigestion after swallowing a hot loaf of bread weighing eight pounds" (de Pescay, François Fournier (1812). "Cas rares". In Panckoucke (ed.). Dictionnaire des sciences médicales (in French). . p. 199.) following a bet.) "showed, even by the standards of their contemporaries, clear signs of mental illness".

=== Doctor's testimonies on Jacques de Falaise ===
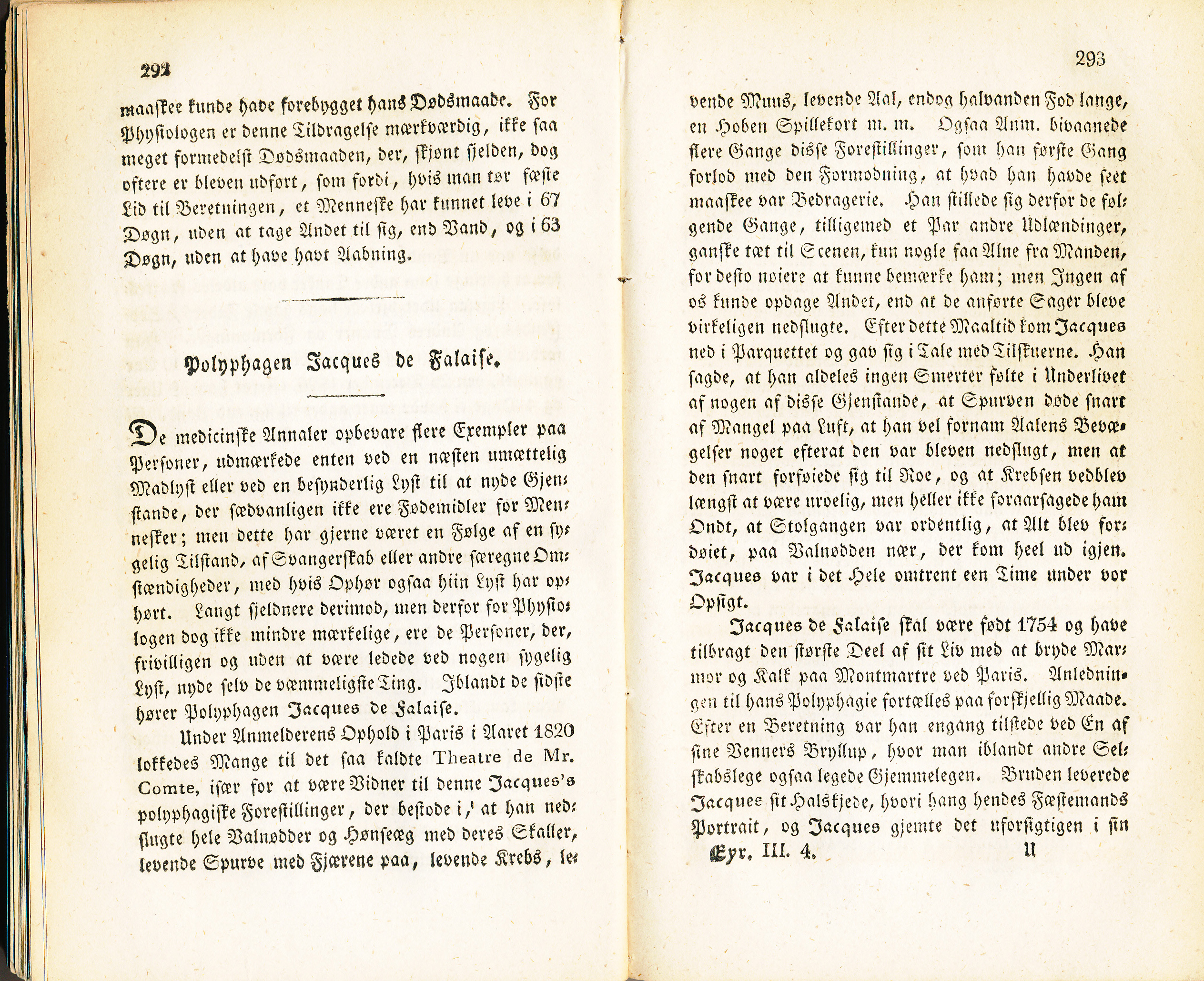
First page of the article devoted to Jacques de Falaise by Dr. Frederik Holst in the Norwegian medical journal Eyr in 1828

During Jacques de Falaise's lifetime, several doctors who witnessed his "experiments" and interviewed him admitted that they could not explain his unusual abilities. Pierre-François Percy and Charles Nicolas Laurent, two doctors specializing in polyphagia, in particular the case of Tarrare, who observed Jacques de Falaise in 1816 at the Théâtre Comte, confined themselves to describing his "experiments". Classifying him as an omophagus, they were particularly interested in his relationship with raw meat, noting that the subject seemed to make "no effort, nor even any movement, to kill in his mouth the live animals he was about to swallow"—a statement contradicted by Dr. Beaudé—that he "even boasted of feeling them stir in his stomach" and that he "pretended to abhor raw flesh, and to be able to swallow only live animals". German forensic pathologist Johann Ludwig Casper testified that he had observed him ingest "a whole raw egg, a live sparrow, a live mouse, a rolled card" in the space of a quarter of an hour, and was convinced that there was no trickery involved; He also observed that the subject hardly seemed "disturbed" by this "horrible meal", that "his ingesta remained in the body a normal time and went away half digested" and that he "enjoyed a considerable, but not unnatural, quantity of ordinary food". The Norwegian physician Frederik Holst, who witnessed Jacques de Falaise's "experiments" during a stay in Paris in 1820, devoted an article to him in the Norwegian medical journal Eyr in 1828. In it, he reported having observed Jacques de Falaise's exploits during a stay in Paris, having placed himself "very close to the scene, a few cubits from the man, so as to be able to observe him more closely. But none of us could observe anything, except that the objects mentioned were indeed devoured. After this meal, Jacques came down from the stage to speak with the spectators. He said he felt absolutely no stomach pain from these objects, adding that the sparrow had died quickly from asphyxiation and that he had distinctly felt the movements of the eel some time after devouring it, but that everything had then returned to normal, and that the crayfish had been the longest to stop moving, without causing him any pain either. His bowel movements were normal, with everything he had swallowed except the nuts coming out whole. All in all, we were able to observe Jacques for an hour."

=== Autopsy ===
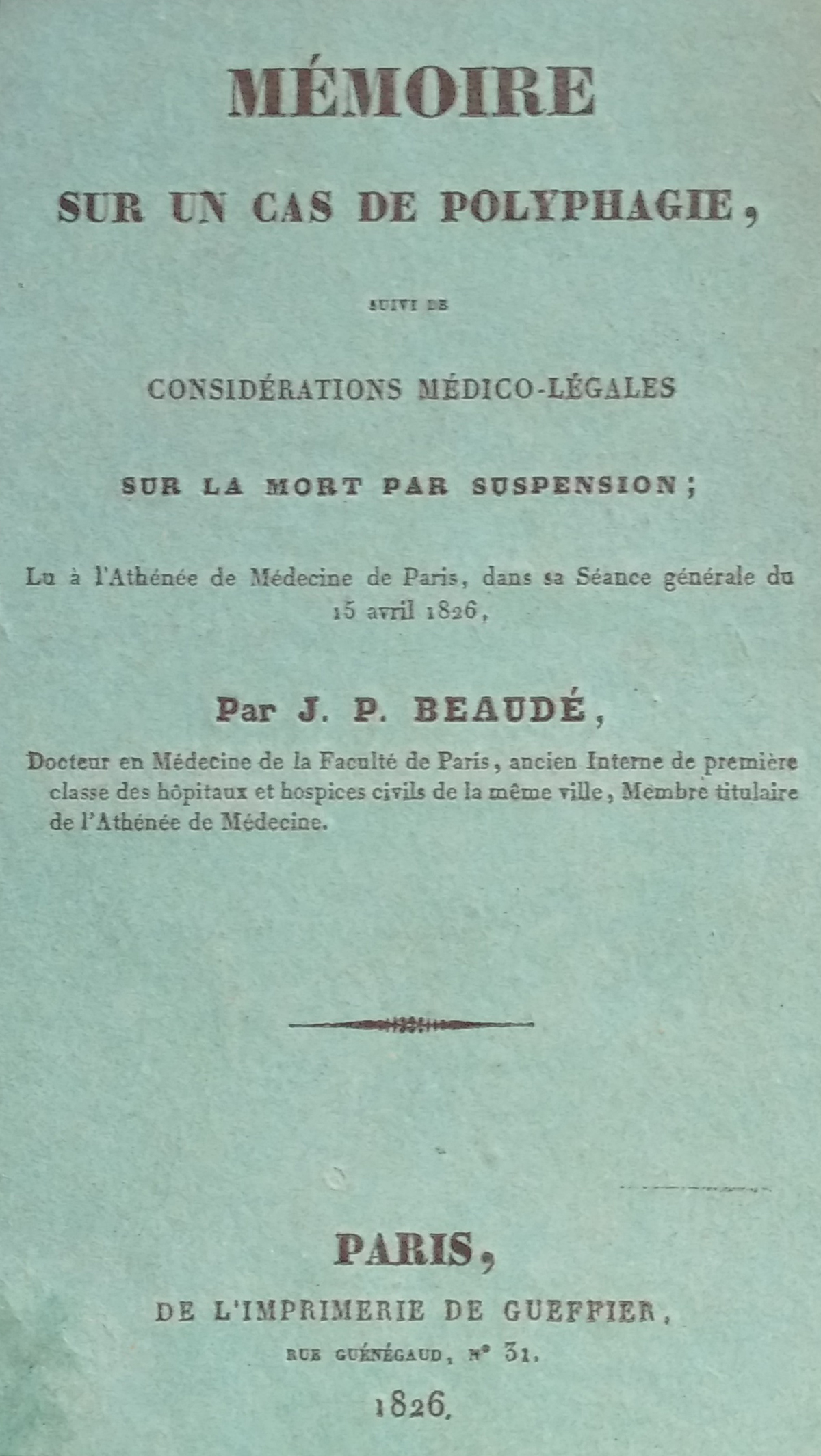
Cover of the offprint of Mémoire du docteur Beaudé (1826)

On Jacques de Falaise's death, in view of the interest aroused by his "polyphagic experiments", the Académie de Médecine appointed a commission to carry out his autopsy, with the participation of Doctors Beaudé and de Troisvèvre. Dr. Beaudé, who drew "very important conclusions" from the autopsy (communicated to the Paris Medical Athenaeum on 15 April 1826), noted that the pharynx, esophagus and pylorus were of "considerable extent", which, in his opinion, explained the subject's facility in swallowing large objects, but also resulted from it. The stomach was "greatly distended by a considerable quantity of half-digested food", including three longitudinally-rolled playing cards. This highly developed stomach contained fibrous bundles of "extraordinary development", which Beaudé explained by "the need for the stomach to often deploy considerable contractile force, in order to expel from its interior the refractory substances that had been introduced". Beaudé noted, on the other hand, that the mucous membrane of the ileum was "almost destroyed"; that "the other tunics of the intestine were so thinned that through these points one observed a very marked transparency"; and that the cecum showed "large and numerous scars", likely consequences of the two previous gastroenteritises. For his part, Dr. de Troisvèvre, after noting that the subject was "very thin", stressed that he had found "the abdominal organs not very developed", "in a healthy state" and "only a little more dilatable than they usually are".

Based on his findings, Dr. Beaudé concluded that Jacques de Falaise's capacity for ingestion could not be explained by a remarkable arrangement of the digestive organs. In his opinion, there was "nothing remarkable in this respect" other than the large size of the pharynx, esophagus and pylorus. Consequently, the "polyphagic" feats were to be attributed, in his view, solely to the fact that he had "overcome the remoteness and disgust that one ordinarily experiences when ingesting these kinds of bodies in the stomach". Beaudé pointed out that "the stomach acquired a considerable amplitude in people who habitually introduced a large number of foods into it", and that "the bladder often became very large in people accustomed to withholding their urine". He deduced that, in all likelihood, in the subject, "the more considerable development of the pharynx, esophagus and pylorus, must have been only successive; at first he swallowed only birds, cards, flowers, objects which presented a volume larger in appearance than it really was; but gradually, and after months of habit and effort, he succeeded in passing bodies astonishing in size and number; only then had the alimentary canal acquired a proportionate size, and perhaps more considerable than that observed during the autopsy".

As for the question of "how it happened that a host of bodies, so capable by their shape, weight and nature, of determining an inflammation of the gastrointestinal mucosa, had, for so long, daily irritated the interior of the digestive tract, without more often than not resulting in the onset of gastroenteritis", Beaudé replied that the example of Jacques de Falaise confirmed that "we often exaggerate too much the sensitivity of the stomach, and consequently the influence of external causes, in the production of gastrointestinal inflammations". He added that the scars on Jacques de Falaise's cecum proved that "intestinal ulcerations were far from being as serious as they used to be". On the other hand, he suspected that the state of the digestive tract and the liver, which he noted were dilated, "may have exerted their influence on the cerebral functions, determining the suicide".

Beaudé also carefully distinguished the case of Jacques de Falaise from that of Tarrare, famous in the previous century. While the latter was the victim of insatiable gluttony resulting from an illness, the former manifested an "acquired disposition": "Jacques de Falaise was in no way stimulated by an extraordinary appetite; he only indulged in his exercises out of boasting or desire for gain, whereas Tarrare gave in to an irresistible need that he sought to satisfy at all costs". Several nineteenth-century authors equated polyphagia with an extreme form of gluttony—such as Baudelaire, who had the lover of a gluttonous mistress say that he could have made a fortune "by showing her at fairs as a polyphagous monster"—or even with omophagia. A contributor to the Journal complémentaire du dictionnaire des sciences médicales by Panckoucke wrote that "the voracity of the disgusting omophagous, Tarrare, Bijoux, Falaise and others, had become an irresistible need for these ignoble individuals". This depreciation can be compared with the aphorism of an anonymous editor of Le Gastronome: "Jacques de Falaise is the strongest argument against the immortality of the soul".

== Posterity ==
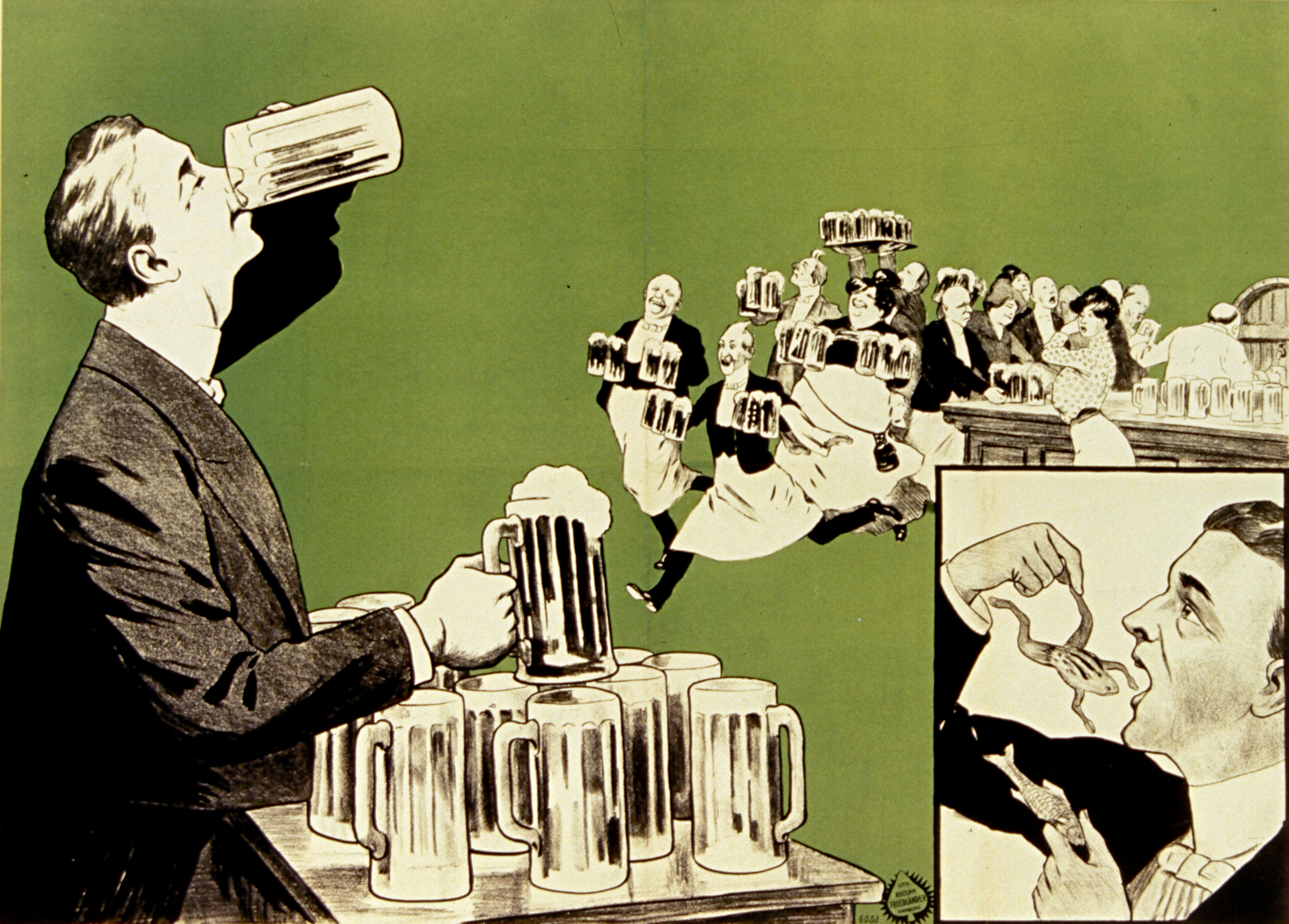
Mac Norton, the aquarium man, in 1913

De Falaise never regurgitated what he had swallowed. Because his "polyphagia" was the result of a deliberate habitual practice and not a malformation, Jacques de Falaise is considered the "ancestor" of a circus and music hall specialty, the "mérycistes". (Note: Merycism is "a phenomenon quite similar to rumination in bovids; it consists in consciously or unconsciously pushing food that has already reached the stomach back into the mouth". (Decary, Raymond (1930). "Un magicien malgache; mérycisme ou simulation". Bulletins et Mémoires de la Société d'anthropologie de Paris (in French). 1 (1): 1–3. doi:10.3406/bmsap.1930.9257.) Circus "merycists" have practiced regurgitating larger and larger objects, starting, for example, according to Harry Houdini, with very small potatoes. (Houdini, Harry (1920). Miracle Mongers and Their Methods. E. P. Dutton & Company. pp. 159–168.) The exercise can be dangerous, however. Alexandre de Hübner reports seeing a circus performer in China "actually swallow half a dozen small cups of fine porcelain and return them after a few minutes", while his comrade "after swallowing the cups could not return them, and died in excruciating pain". (von Hübner, Joseph Alexander (1873). Promenade autour du monde (in French). Hachette. pp. 242–243, t. 2.)) These artists include:

- Mac Norton, born Claude Louis Delair, aka the Aquarium Man, of the Rancy circus, reputed to have "the ideal stomach", evoked by Colette in her Journal, who, after starting out as a singer, had, under the influence of his friend Le Pétomane, reconverted to rumination. He would "swallow live frogs and fish, converse for long minutes with the audience, then disgorge, the animals still alive. He sometimes managed to keep the frogs in his digestive tract for 2 hours", claiming that "one of the frogs, the oldest, set an example for the others and 'calmed them down'. She was the last to emerge. Harry Houdini reported that he had once seen him return to his dressing room very worried: "it seemed that he had lost a frog—at least he didn't have a count of his whole troupe—and he looked very frightened, fearing that he had digested it alive".
- Roginsky, who, in 1921, at the Medrano circus, "feasted on two dozen whole hazelnuts with their shells" and "on command would bring out the number of hazelnuts requested". He would also swallow goldfish, then "return to daylight one or more of these little animals which remained perfectly alive" and " he crowned his exercises by absorbing, wrapped in small rubber bags, banknotes of varying value and returning them in the order in which they were demanded without ever making a mistake or frustrating those who had ventured to entrust them to him".
- Hadji Ali, known as "the Egyptian enigma", a music hall performer of Egyptian origin born around 1890, allegedly to a cannibal mother, who said he discovered his talent by chance one day while swimming in the Nile: having swallowed a fish, he returned it alive. He would swallow live fish, watches, lighted cigarettes and handkerchiefs, returning them in the order requested, then, spitting kerosene, set fire to a small miniature castle, which he would then extinguish with a long jet of water, also regurgitated.

== See also ==
- Tarrare
- Polyphagia
- Pica (disorder)
- Michel Lotito
- Hadji Ali
- Charles Domery
- Sword swallowing

== Bibliography ==
- Notice sur Jacques de Falaise, ses habitudes, sa nourriture et les moyens qu'il emploie pour conserver sa santé (in French). Ballard. 1820.
- Beaudé, Jean-Pierre (1826). "Mémoire sur un cas de polyphagie, suivi de considérations médicolégales sur la mort par suspension, lu à l'Athénée de médecine de Paris, dans sa séance générale du 15 avril 1826". In Gabon (ed.). Nouvelle Bibliothèque médicale (in French). ..
- Bondeson, Jan (2000). The Two-headed Boy, and Other Medical Marvels. Cornell University Press. ISBN 9780801489587.
- La Mésangère, Pierre de (1827). Observations sur les modes et les usages de Paris, pour servir d'explication aux 115 caricatures publiées sous le titre de Bon genre depuis le commencement du dix-neuvième siècle (in French).
