= MYT1L =

Protein-coding gene in the species Homo sapiens

Identifiers
- Aliases: MYT1L, NZF1, ZC2HC4B, MRD39, ZC2H2C2, myelin transcription factor 1 like, myT1-L
- External IDs: OMIM: 613084; MGI: 1100511; GeneCards: MYT1L

Gene location (Human)
Chr.	Chromosome 2 (human)
Band	2p25.3	Start	1,789,113 bp
Band	2p25.3	End	2,331,664 bp

Gene location (Mouse)
Chr.	Chromosome 12 (mouse)
Band	12 A2|12 11.86 cM	Start	29,528,384 bp
Band	12 A2|12 11.86 cM	End	29,923,213 bp
RNA expression pattern
Bgee	Human / Mouse (ortholog); Top expressed in: endothelial cell; Brodmann area 23; Region I of hippocampus proper; Brodmann area 46; primary visual cortex; orbitofrontal cortex; postcentral gyrus; middle temporal gyrus; superior frontal gyrus; entorhinal cortex / Top expressed in: olfactory tubercle; cingulate gyrus; anterior amygdaloid area; lateral septal nucleus; nucleus accumbens; Region I of hippocampus proper; subiculum; ventromedial nucleus; substantia nigra; primary motor cortex; More reference expression data
BioGPS	n/a
Gene ontology
Molecular function	DNA-binding transcription factor activity; DNA binding; zinc ion binding; metal ion binding; DNA-binding transcription repressor activity, RNA polymerase II-specific; DNA-binding transcription factor activity, RNA polymerase II-specific; RNA polymerase II transcription regulatory region sequence-specific DNA binding; DNA-binding transcription activator activity, RNA polymerase II-specific
Cellular component	nucleus; chromosome
Biological process	multicellular organism development; cell differentiation; regulation of transcription, DNA-templated; transcription, DNA-templated; nervous system development; negative regulation of transcription by RNA polymerase II; regulation of transcription by RNA polymerase II; neuron differentiation; neuron fate commitment; neuron fate specification; neuron development; positive regulation of transcription by RNA polymerase II
Sources:Amigo / QuickGO
Orthologs
Databases	NCBI: entry; OMA: entry
Species	Human	Mouse
Entrez	23040	17933
Ensembl	ENSG00000186487	ENSMUSG00000061911
UniProt	Q9UL68	P97500
RefSeq (mRNA)	NM_001303052; NM_015025; NM_001329844; NM_001329845; NM_001329846 NM_001329847; NM_001329848; NM_001329849; NM_001329851; NM_001329852	NM_001093775; NM_001093776; NM_001093778; NM_008666; NM_001361655 NM_001361656; NM_001361657; NM_001361658; NM_001361659; NM_001361660
RefSeq (protein)	NP_001289981; NP_001316773; NP_001316774; NP_001316775; NP_001316776 NP_001316777; NP_001316778; NP_001316780; NP_001316781; NP_055840	NP_001087244; NP_001087245; NP_001087247; NP_032692; NP_001348584 NP_001348585; NP_001348586; NP_001348587; NP_001348588; NP_001348589
Location (UCSC)	Chr 2: 1.79 – 2.33 Mb	Chr 12: 29.53 – 29.92 Mb
PubMed search
- Wikidata
View/Edit Human	View/Edit Mouse

Myelin transcription factor 1 like is a protein that in humans is encoded by the MYT1L gene.

== Function ==
This gene encodes a member of the zinc finger superfamily of transcription factors whose expression, thus far, has been found only in neuronal tissues. The encoded protein belongs to a novel class of cystein-cystein-histidine-cystein zinc finger proteins that function in the developing mammalian central nervous system. Forced expression of this gene in combination with the basic helix-loop-helix transcription factor NeuroD1 and the transcription factors POU class 3 homeobox 2 and achaete-scute family basic helix-loop-helix transcription factor 1 can convert fetal and postnatal human fibroblasts into induced neuronal cells, which are able to generate action potentials. Mutations in this gene have been associated with an autosomal dominant form of cognitive disability and with autism spectrum disorder. Alternative splicing results in multiple variants. [provided by RefSeq, Jul 2017].

== MYT1L syndrome ==
MYT1L syndrome is a rare neurodevelopmental disorder caused by mutations or deletions in the MYT1L gene, which encodes a transcription factor involved in brain development. Individuals with MYT1L syndrome often present with a range of features, including variable intellectual disability, extreme emotional dysregulation, autistic behaviors, hypotonia (low muscle tone), epilepsy, developmental delays, insatiable appetite leading to obesity and other behavioral and psychiatric challenges. Approximately 30% of individuals with MYT1L syndrome are not intellectually disabled, but instead have a specific learning disability.

The syndrome was first recognized through exome sequencing studies and has since been documented in several hundred individuals worldwide. Diagnosis is typically made via genetic testing.

The MYT1L Project Foundation is a parent-led, scientist-supported foundation established in 2025 to advance research into evidence-based interventions for MYT1L Neurodevelopmental Syndrome. The foundation is uniting families impacted by MYT1L syndrome and is working together towards a cure.
