= John Fasel =

American freak show performer (born c.1881)

John Fasel (fl. 1899–1904) was an American man known for his eating habits. Nicknamed the "Human Ostrich", he was active in New York City and ate metal objects as part of a performance act.

Fasel was born c. 1881. In June 1899, he was hired as a performer in a freak show. He also worked as an independent performer with his John Fasel Association. He lived in Williamsburg, Brooklyn. He was nicknamed the "Human Ostrich" and less popularly the "Chain Swallower" and "The Human Junk Shop". He suffered from epilepsy and was hospitalized due to the condition in October 1908 following a seizure where he bit his mother and surgeon Mary M. Crawford.

In January 1900, Fasel was admitted to St. John's Episcopal Hospital for indigestion. Doctors removed three pocket watch chains, twenty-four nails, three keys, five hairpins, 128 pins, and some pocketknives, among other objects. Following the procedure, doctors suggested he change his career, so he then worked as a tailor, though tailoring did not pay enough, and by February, he returned to performing.

On August 4, 1900, Fasel was admitted to Saint Catherine's Hospital in Williamsburg for indigestion. Doctors removed three or four nails and a piece of bone; he was released from the hospital on August 8. He claimed he was coerced by a group of men at a saloon into eating the nails with the threat of violence. Dr. Klein claimed that he had a photograph of Fasel's x-ray, which showed no objects in his stomach. After the surgery, Fasel returned to performing, now keeping a compendium of what he swallowed and working more cautiously.

In 1904, Fasel was admitted to the German Hospital for indigestion. Doctors removed thirteen pounds of objects from his stomach, including eighteen nails, six knives, six keys, a pocket watch chain, a keychain, two pins, and a buttonhook. Doctors claimed that the objects themselves did not harm Fasel, but their combined weight caused his stomach to sag. After the procedure, he stated that he would retire from performing. A 1931 article in The Minneapolis Journal reported that he had retired to a farm, dying soon after.

== See also ==
- Michel Lotito, French entertainer with a metal-eating act
