= Charles Domery =

Polish soldier and eater

Charles Domery (c. 1778 – after 1800), later also known as Charles Domerz, was a Polish (Note: Most sources attribute Polish nationality to him, but his name and that of his birthplace are almost certainly corrupted. It is also likely that while he might have indeed been of Polish ethnicity, he was born under Prussian administration, in the Polish lands recently annexed by Prussia under First Partition of Poland, and as such was a Prussian citizen.) soldier serving in the Prussian and French armies, noted for his unusually large appetite. Serving in the Prussian Army against France during the War of the First Coalition, he found that the rations of the Prussians were insufficient and deserted to the French Army in return for food. Although generally healthy, he was voraciously hungry during his time in the French service and ate any available food. While stationed near Paris, he was recorded as having eaten 174 cats in a year, and although he disliked vegetables, he would eat 4 to 5 pounds (1.8 to 2.3 kg) of grass each day if he could not find other food. During service on the French ship Hoche, he attempted to eat the severed leg of a crew member hit by cannon fire, before other members of the crew wrestled it from him.

In February 1799, the Hoche was captured by British forces and the crew, including Domery, were interned in Liverpool, where he shocked his captors with his voracious appetite: despite being put on ten times the usual rations, he ate the prison cat and at least 20 rats, and would often eat the prison candles. In one experiment, over the course of a day, he ate 16 pounds (7.3 kg) of raw cow's udder, raw beef and tallow candles and four bottles of porter, all of which he ate and drank without defecating, urinating, or vomiting.

Almost everything known about Domery comes from a 1799 account by Dr. J. Johnston in the Medical and Physical Journal, based largely upon information provided by Dr. Thomas Cochrane.

== Appearance and behaviour ==
Charles Domery (later also known as Charles Domerz) was born in Benche, Poland, in around 1778. (Note: Domery's exact date of birth is not recorded. He gave his age as 21 on his capture by the British in February 1799. His birthplace is given as "Benche" in all sources, but no town of that name exists in Poland, and it may be a misspelling in an early report which has been perpetuated.) From the age of 13, Domery had an unusually large appetite. He was one of nine brothers, all of whom Domery said suffered from the same condition. Domery recalled that his father was a hearty eater and generally ate his meat half-boiled, but he could not recall the quantity. The only illness Domery was aware of in the family was an outbreak of smallpox in his youth, which was survived by all the family.

Despite his unusual diet and behaviour in the presence of food, doctors described Domery as of a normal build, and tall for the period at 6 feet 3 inches (1.91 m). He had long, brown hair and grey eyes, was smooth-skinned, and was described as having a "pleasant countenance". Doctors observing Domery saw no signs of mental illness and although illiterate, he was considered of normal intelligence by his crewmates and by the prison doctors who studied him. Despite eating vast amounts of food, it was noted by the doctors studying him that he never vomited, other than when fed large amounts of roasted or boiled meat. He showed no outward signs of ill health, and doctors observing him noted that his eyes were lively and his tongue clean. His pulse was regular at around 84 BPM, and his body temperature normal. His muscles were normally formed, but observed by doctors to be weaker than usual, although during his time in the army, he had marched 14 French leagues (approximately 25 mi/42 km) in a day with no ill effects. (Note: The lieue, or French league, varied in meaning around the country. The commonest usages were 10,000 feet (3 km) or 2,000 toise (4 km).)

In one year, [Domery] devoured 174 cats (not their skins) dead or alive; and says, he had several severe conflicts of interest in the act of destroying them, by feeling the effects of their torments on his face and hands: sometimes, he killed them before eating, but when very hungry, did not wait to perform this humane office.

— Testimony of M. Picard, who served with Domery throughout his service in the French Army and was interned with him in Liverpool.

It was observed that immediately after going to bed, generally at about 8:00 pm, Domery would begin to sweat profusely. After one to two hours lying awake and perspiring, he would fall asleep before waking at around 1:00 am extremely hungry, regardless of what he had eaten before going to bed. At this time, he would eat any available food, or if no food was available, he would smoke tobacco. At around 2:00 am, he would go back to sleep, and wake again at between 5:00 and 6:00 am, sweating heavily; as soon as he got out of bed, the sweating would cease, starting again whenever he ate.

== Military service ==
By the age of 13, Domery had enlisted in the Prussian Army, and became part of an army besieging Thionville during the War of the First Coalition. The Prussian Army was suffering from food shortages which Domery found intolerable; he entered the town and surrendered to the French commander who rewarded him with a large melon, which Domery immediately ate, including the rind. He was then given a wide variety of other foodstuffs by the French general, all of which he ate straight away.

Domery then enlisted with the French Revolutionary Army, and shocked his new comrades with his unusual eating habits and voracious appetite. Granted double rations, and using his pay to buy additional food whenever possible, he nonetheless suffered from extreme hunger; while based in an army camp near Paris, Domery ate 174 cats in a single year, leaving only the skins and bones, and ate 4 to 5 pounds (1.8 to 2.3 kg) of grass each day if other food was unavailable.

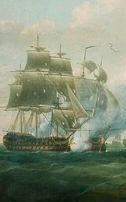
The Hoche, on which Domery was captured

He preferred raw meat to cooked; while his favourite dish was a raw bullock's liver, he would eat any available meat. While in service on board the French ship Hoche, a sailor's leg was shot off by cannon fire, and Domery grabbed the severed limb and began to eat it until a crew member wrestled it from him and threw it into the sea. (Note: The descriptions of Domery's background and diet prior to his capture by the British derive mainly from testimony obtained during the interrogation of the Hoche crew, and cannot be verified. In light of Domery's subsequent behaviour in the internment camp, their testimony was accepted by the British doctors examining Domery as accurate.)

== Capture ==
In October 1798, a Royal Navy squadron under the command of Sir John Borlase Warren captured the Hoche off the coast of Ireland, and those on board, including Domery, were interned in a prison camp near Liverpool. The British guards were also shocked by Domery's appetite and agreed to place him on double rations. These were insufficient, and his rations were increased until eventually he was granted the rations of ten men each day. Rations for prisoners of war in this period were paid for by the country in whose army the prisoners had served. The standard daily ration for a French prisoner of war was 26 ounces (740 g) of bread, half a pound (230 g) of vegetables and 2 ounces (57 g) of butter or 6 ounces (170 g) of cheese.

Domery remained hungry and was recorded as having eaten the prison cat and "at least 20 rats" which had strayed into his cell. Domery also ate the medicines of those prisoners in the camp's infirmary who refused to take them, suffering no apparent adverse effects as a result. It was also recorded that he would regularly eat the prison's candles, and that if his ration of beer was exhausted, he would resort to drinking water to wash down his food (to reduce the risk of water-borne disease, troops were issued rations of mildly alcoholic beverages such as small beer and diluted rum, and drinks such as tea and coffee which involved boiling water before drinking).

== Experimental subject ==
The eagerness with which he attacks his beef when his stomach is not gorged, resembles the voracity of a hungry wolf, tearing off and swallowing it with canine greediness. When his throat is dry from continued exercise, he lubricates it by stripping the grease off the candles between his teeth, which he generally finishes at three mouthfuls, and wrapping the wick like a ball, string and all, sends it after at a swallow. He can, when no choice is left, make shift to dine on immense quantities of raw potatoes or turnips; but, from choice, would never desire to taste bread or vegetables.

— Dr J. Johnston

The prison commander brought his unusual captive to the attention of the Sick and Hurt Commissioners, the body then responsible for all medical services in the Royal Navy and for overseeing the welfare of prisoners of war. Dr J. Johnston, a member of the commission, and Dr Cochrane, Fellow of the Royal College of Physicians of Edinburgh, performed an experiment to test Domery's eating capacity and tolerance for unusual foods. At 4:00 am, Domery was awakened and fed 4 lbs (1.8 kg) of raw cow's udder, which was eaten without hesitation. At 9:30 am, he was given a meal of 5 lbs (2.3 kg) of raw beef, twelve large tallow candles totalling one pound (453 g), and a bottle of porter, all of which were consumed. At 1:00 pm, Domery was given another meal of a further 5 lbs of beef, a pound (453 g) of candles, and three large bottles of porter, all of which were also eaten and drunk. During the course of the experiment, he did not defecate, urinate or vomit at any point, his pulse remained regular and his skin did not change temperature. Upon Domery's return to his quarters at 6:15 pm following the conclusion of the experiment, he was recorded as being of "particularly good cheer", and danced, smoked his pipe and drank a further bottle of porter.

=== Medical explanation for his appetite ===
The cause of Domery's appetite is not known. While there are other documented cases of similar behaviour from this period, none of the subjects other than Domery's contemporary Tarrare were autopsied, and there have been no modern documented cases of polyphagia (excessive appetite) as extreme as Domery. Hyperthyroidism can induce an extreme appetite and rapid weight loss, while Bondeson (2006) speculates that Domery possibly suffered from a damaged amygdala or ventromedial nucleus; it is known that injuries to the amygdala or ventromedial nucleus in animals can induce polyphagia.

== Later life and legacy ==
It is not recorded what became of Domery, or of the other Hoche captives, following their internment, and it is not known if he returned to Poland or remained in Liverpool. The case of Charles Domery briefly returned to public notice in 1852 when it came to the attention of Charles Dickens, who wrote of Domery that "Now, it is my opinion, that a man like this, dining in public on the stage of Drury Lane, would draw much better than a mere tragedian, who chews unsubstantial words instead of wholesome beef".

== See also ==
- Tarrare, a French showman and soldier, noted for his unusual eating habits.
- Michel Lotito, a French entertainer known as Monsieur Mangetout (Mr. "Eat-All")
- Jacques de Falaise
- List of incidents of cannibalism
