= Pierre-François Percy =

French doctor and surgeon

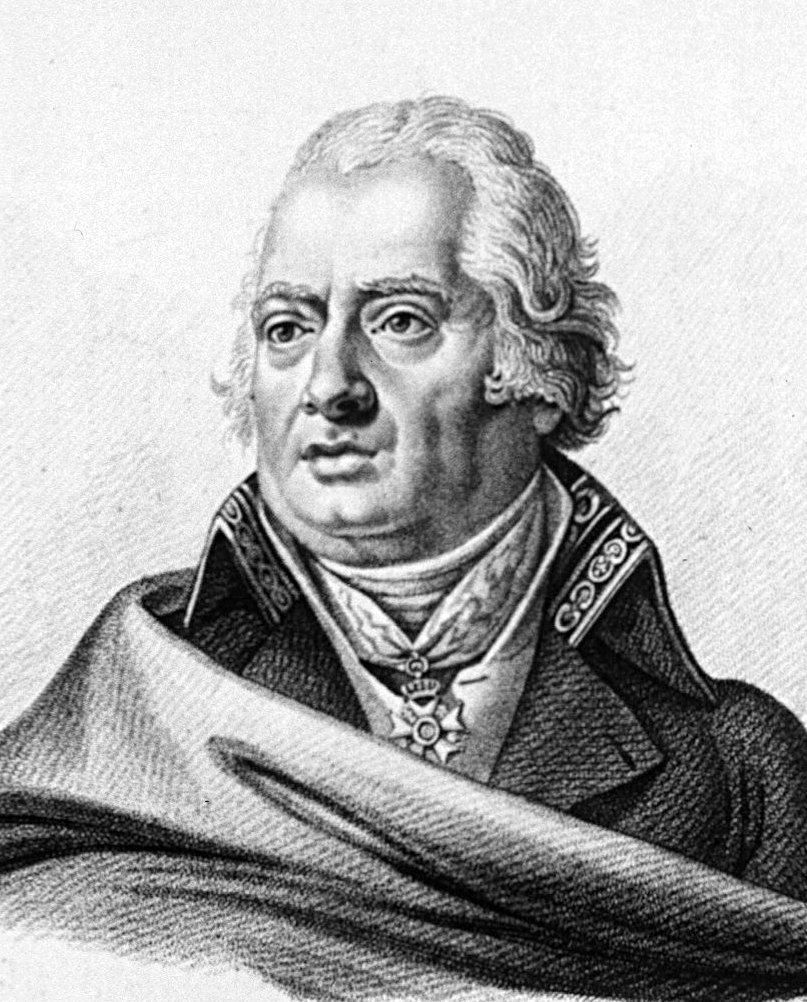
Pierre-François Percy

Pierre-François Percy (28 October 1754 – 18 February 1825) was a French medical doctor and surgeon.

He was surgeon-in-chief of Napoleon's Grande Armée during the Napoleonic campaigns in Germany and Poland, and present at the Battles of Jena and Friedland.

== Biography ==
Pierre-François Percy, was born on 28 October 1754 in Montagney, Franche-Comté (now in Haute-Saône). His father, Claude Percy, was a surgeon in the village and had previously served as a surgeon in the French army.

The house where Percy was born still features a plaque commemorating his achievements.

In 1802, Percy married Rosalie-Claudine Wolff. He was 47 and she was 43.

Percy died on 18 February 1825 and was buried at Père-Lachaise Cemetery in Paris. He had no children.

== Career ==
After studying in Besançon, Percy was named surgeon-major of the Berry cavalry regiment in 1782.

Percy was doctor to the polyphage Tarrare during Tarrare's time in the French Army and later, in 1798 at the time of his death. In 1804, he wrote Mémoire sur la polyphagie, a paper on the life and medical history of Tarrare.

During the wars of the French Revolution and Empire, he invented a new kind of ambulance usable on the battlefield known as a "wurst", as well as the cork-balls and the surgical quiver.

He served on the main battlefields of the Empire and became chief surgeon of the Grande Armée, but had to leave the army after 1809 because of ocular problems. His replacement as chief surgeon of the Grande Armée was Nicolas Heurteloup (1750-1812).

He resumed service in 1814 and his conduct earned him the esteem of the Allied armies.

Percy had to retire during the Restoration and died in Paris on 18 February 1825.

Percy was a member of the Academy of Sciences, Academy of Medicine, Commander of the Legion of Honor and Baron of the Empire.

== Legacy ==
Percy's name adorns the Northern pillar of the Arc de Triomphe in Paris.

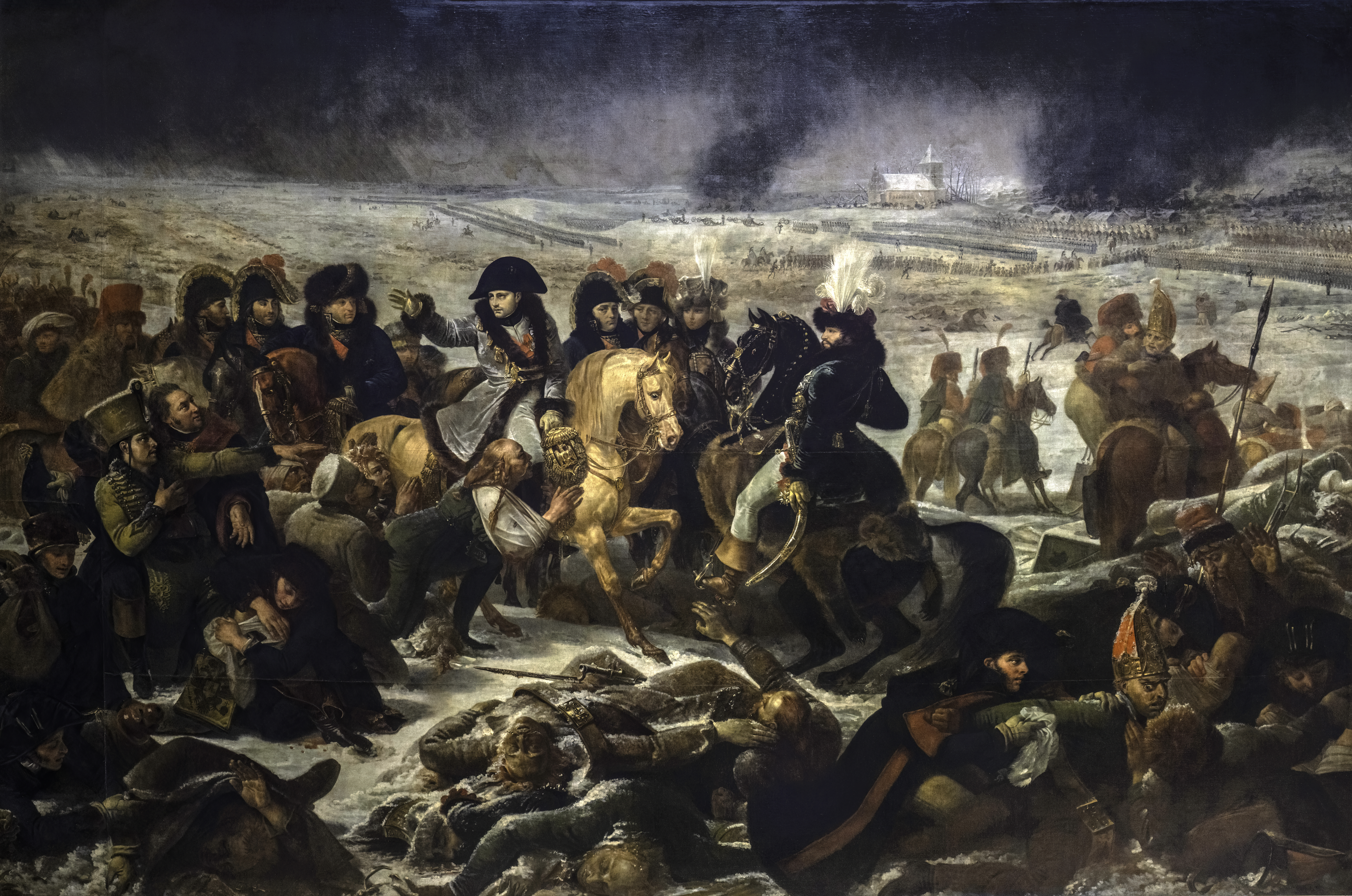
Antoine-Jean Gros's 1808 painting Napoléon on the Battlefield of Eylau. Percy can be seen to the left of the Emperor wearing a red shawl, and gesturing to a medical aide.

He is shown in the French painter Antoine-Jean Gros's 1808 painting Napoléon on the Battlefield of Eylau. Percy is presented on the left of the Emperor, signalling to a medical aide who is bandaging a Lithuanian hussar.

His tomb is in the 18th division of the Père-Lachaise Cemetery in Paris.

== Works ==
Percy is perhaps best-known for his Journal des Campagnes, which was published in 1904 by the Franc-comtois historian Émile Longin, and translated in 2024 into English by the author Calum Johnson. The Journal is a frequent, almost-daily account of Percy's life on campaign in the Revolutionary and Napoleonic Wars. Some manuscripts were lost in the 79 years between the surgeon's death and the publication of the Journal, although Percy's writings on the 1806 and 1807 campaigns in Germany and Poland are almost complete. The Journal also includes notes from the 1799 and 1800 campaigns in Helvetia and Germany, the 1805 Austerlitz campaign, and the campaign in Spain (1808-1809).

Percy's Journal describes the often-terrible conditions of army life and military surgery, and the chaos that ensued in the aftermath of major battles.

His account describes meetings with Jourdan, Napoleon and, at Tilsit in 1807, the monarchs Alexander I of Russia and Frederick William III of Prussia.

== Sources ==
- Biography of Pierre-François Percy on the Napoleon & Empire website (in English).
- Percy's Campaign Journal (in French) on archive.org
- Percy's Campaign Journal (in English), translated by Calum Johnson, and published by Pen and Sword Books (2024).
