= Tarrare =

French showman and voracious eater (c. 1772–1798)

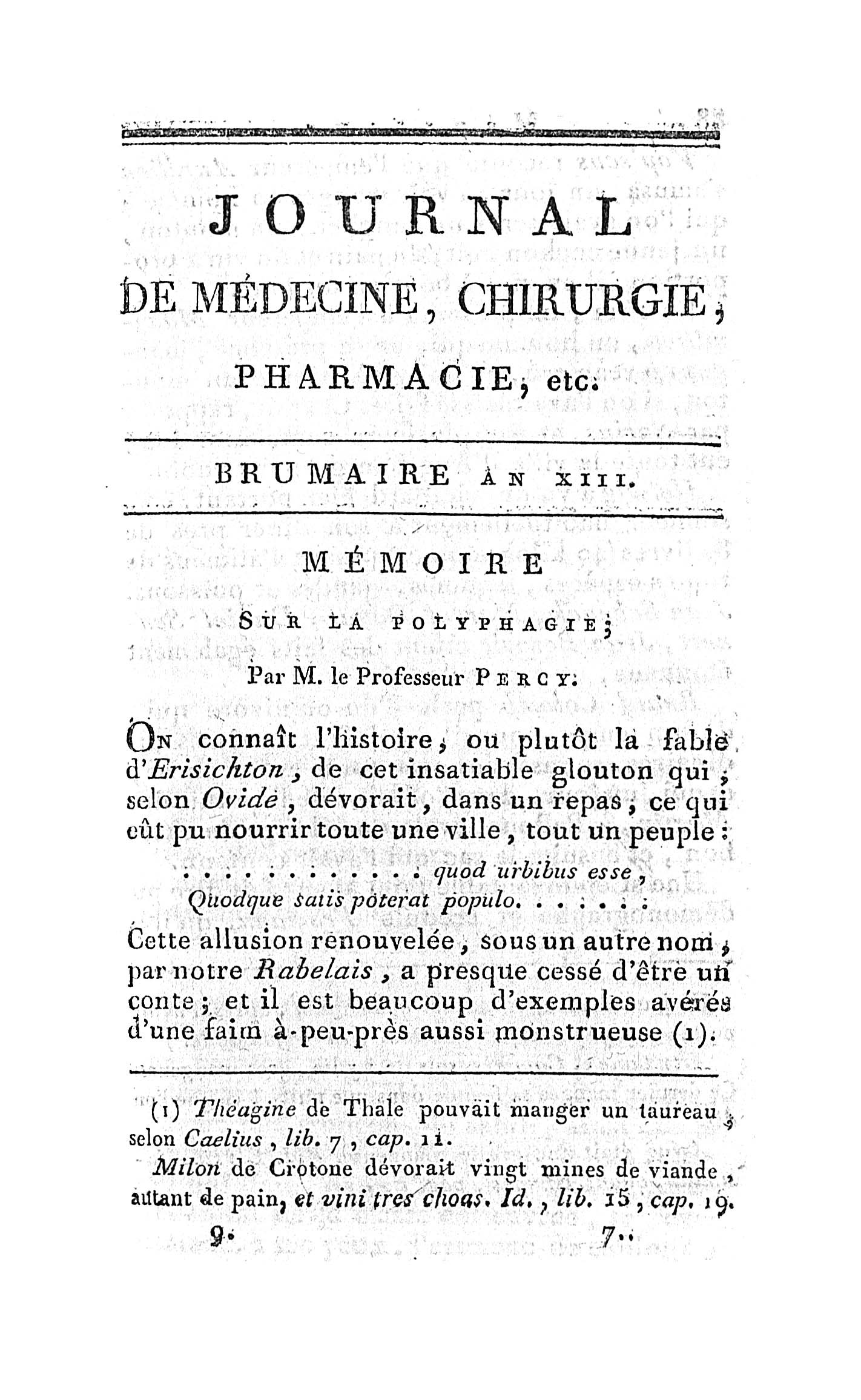
- Doctor Pierre-François Percy's original paper on Tarrare's medical history, Mémoire sur la polyphagie (1804)
- Born: c.1772 near Lyon, France
- Died: 1798 (aged 25–26); Versailles, France
- Other name: Tarar
- Military career
- Allegiance: French First Republic
- Service: French Revolutionary Army
- Service years: 1792–1794
- Known for: Extreme appetite
- War: War of the First Coalition

Tarrare (French: [taʁaʁ]; c. 1772 – 1798), sometimes spelled Tarar, was a French showman, soldier, and spy noted for his unusual appetite and eating habits. Able to eat vast amounts of meat, he was constantly hungry. His parents could not provide for him and he was turned out of the family home as a teenager. He travelled around France in the company of a band of prostitutes and thieves before becoming the warm-up act for a travelling charlatan. In this act, he swallowed corks, stones, live animals, and a whole basketful of apples. He then took this act to Paris, where he worked as a street performer.

At the start of the War of the First Coalition, Tarrare joined the French Revolutionary Army, where even quadrupling the standard military ration was unable to satisfy his large appetite. He ate any available food from gutters and rubbish heaps but his condition still deteriorated through hunger, and he was hospitalised due to exhaustion. He became the subject of a series of medical experiments to test his eating capacity, in which, among other things, he ate a meal intended for 15 people in a single sitting, ate live cats, snakes, lizards, and puppies, and swallowed eels whole without chewing. Despite his unusual diet, he was underweight and, except for his eating habits, showed no signs of mental illness other than what was described as an apathetic temperament.

General Alexandre de Beauharnais decided to put Tarrare's abilities to military use, and employed him as a courier for the French army, with the intention that he would swallow documents, pass through enemy lines, and recover them from his stool once safely at his destination. On his first mission, he was captured by Prussian forces, severely beaten, and subjected to a mock execution before being returned to French lines.

Chastened by this experience, he agreed to submit to any procedure that might cure his appetite. The procedures failed, and doctors could not keep him on a controlled diet; he sneaked out of the hospital to scavenge for offal in gutters and rubbish heaps and outside butchers' shops, and attempted to drink the blood of other patients in the hospital while they were bloodletted and to eat the corpses in the hospital's morgue. After being suspected of eating a one-year-old toddler, he was ejected from the hospital. He reappeared four years later in Versailles with a case of severe tuberculosis and died shortly afterwards, following a lengthy bout of exudative diarrhoea.

== Early life ==
Tarrare was born near Lyon, around 1772. (Note: As Tarrare's real name is unknown, it is impossible to determine his date of birth; doctors estimated his age as 26 at his death in 1798.) His date of birth is unrecorded and it is not known whether Tarrare was his real name or a nickname.

As a child, Tarrare had a huge appetite, and by his teens he could eat a quarter of a bullock, weighing as much as Tarrare himself, in a single day. By this time, his parents could not provide for him and had forced him to leave home. For some years after this, he toured the country with a roaming band of thieves and prostitutes, stealing and begging for food, before gaining employment as a warm-up act to a travelling charlatan. Tarrare drew a crowd by eating corks, stones, and live animals, and by swallowing an entire basketful of apples one after the other. He ate ravenously and was particularly fond of snake meat.

In 1788, Tarrare moved to Paris to work as a street performer. He appears to have been successful in general, but on one occasion, the act went wrong and he suffered severe intestinal obstruction. Members of the crowd carried him to the Hôtel-Dieu hospital, where he was treated with powerful laxatives. He made a full recovery and offered to demonstrate his act by eating his surgeon's watch and chain; M. Giraud, the surgeon, was unimpressed by the offer and warned him that if he did so, he would cut Tarrare open to recover the items.

== Appearance and behaviour ==
Despite his unusual diet, Tarrare was slim and of average height. At the age of 17, he weighed only about 100 lb (45 kg; 7 st 2 lb). He was described as having unusually soft fair hair and an abnormally wide mouth (roughly four inches between his jaws when his mouth was fully extended), in which his teeth were heavily stained and on which the lips were almost invisible. When he had not eaten, his skin hung so loosely that he could wrap the fold of skin from his abdomen around his waist. When full, his abdomen distended "like a huge balloon". The skin of his cheeks was wrinkled and hung loosely, and when stretched out, he could hold twelve eggs or apples in his mouth.

His body was hot to the touch and he sweated heavily; he constantly had a foul body odour; he was described as smelling "to such a degree that he could not be endured within the distance of 20 paces". The smell became noticeably worse after he had eaten; his eyes and cheeks became bloodshot, a visible vapour rose from his body, and he became lethargic, during which time he belched noisily and his jaws made swallowing motions. He had chronic diarrhoea, which was said to be "fetid beyond all conception". Despite his large intake of food, he did not appear either to vomit excessively or to gain weight. Aside from his eating habits, his contemporaries saw no apparent signs of mental illness or unusual behaviour in him, other than an apathetic temperament with "a complete lack of force and ideas".

The cause of Tarrare's behaviour is not known. While there are other documented cases of similar behaviour from the period, none of the subjects other than Tarrare were autopsied and there have been no modern documented cases resembling Tarrare. Hyperthyroidism can induce an extreme appetite, rapid weight loss, profuse sweating, heat intolerance, and fine hair. Jan Bondeson speculates that Tarrare had a damaged amygdala; it is known that injuries to the amygdala in animals can induce polyphagia.

== Military service ==
On the outbreak of the War of the First Coalition, Tarrare joined the French Revolutionary Army. However, military rations were insufficient to satisfy his appetite. He carried out tasks for other soldiers in return for a share of their rations and scavenged in dungheaps for scraps, but this was not enough to satisfy him. He was admitted to the military hospital at Soultz-sous-Forêts with a case of extreme exhaustion. He was granted quadruple rations but remained hungry; he scavenged for garbage in gutters and trash containers, ate the scraps of food left by other patients, and crept into the apothecary's room to eat the poultices. Military surgeons could not understand his appetite; Tarrare was ordered to remain in the military hospital to take part in physiological experiments designed by Dr Courville (surgeon to the 9th Hussar Regiment) (Note: Some sources give Courville's name as Comville.) and Pierre-François Percy, surgeon-in-chief of the hospital.

"The dogs and cats fled in terror at his aspect, as if they had anticipated the kind of fate he was preparing for them"

— Percy

Courville and Percy decided to test Tarrare's capacity for food. A meal had been prepared for 15 labourers near the hospital's gates; although generally hospital staff restrained Tarrare in the presence of food, on this occasion, Courville allowed him to reach the table undisturbed. Tarrare ate the entire meal of two large meat pies, plates of grease and salt and four gallons of milk, and then immediately fell asleep; Courville noted that Tarrare's belly became taut and inflated like a large balloon. On another occasion, Tarrare was presented with a live cat. He promptly tore the cat's abdomen open with his teeth, drank its blood, and proceeded to eat the entire cat aside from its bones, before vomiting the remnants of its fur and skin. Following this, hospital staff offered Tarrare a variety of other animals including snakes, lizards and puppies, all of which were eaten; he also swallowed an entire eel without chewing, having first crushed its head with his teeth.

=== Service as a military courier ===
After several months that he spent as an experimental case, military authorities began to press for Tarrare to be returned to active duty. Courville was keen to continue his investigations into Tarrare's eating habits and digestive system, and approached General Alexandre de Beauharnais with a suggestion that Tarrare's unusual abilities and behaviour could be put to military use. A document was placed inside a wooden box which was in turn fed to Tarrare. Two days later, the box was retrieved from his excrement, with the document still in legible condition. Courville proposed to de Beauharnais that Tarrare could thus serve as a military courier, carrying documents securely through enemy territory with no risk of them being found if he were searched.

Tarrare was called on by Beauharnais to demonstrate his abilities before a gathering of the commanders of the Army of the Rhine. Having swallowed the box successfully, Tarrare was given a wheelbarrow filled with 30 pounds (14 kg) of raw bull's lungs and liver as a reward, which he immediately ate in front of the assembled generals.

Following this successful demonstration, Tarrare became employed officially as a spy of the Army of the Rhine. Although de Beauharnais was convinced of Tarrare's physical capacity to carry messages internally, he was concerned about his mental state and initially reluctant to entrust him with significant military documents. Tarrare was ordered as his first assignment to carry a message to a French colonel imprisoned by the Prussians near Neustadt; he was told that the documents were of great military significance, but in reality, de Beauharnais had merely written a note asking the colonel to confirm that the message had been received successfully, and if so, to return a reply of any potentially useful information about Prussian troop movements.

Tarrare crossed Prussian lines under cover of darkness, disguised as a German peasant. Unable to speak German, he soon attracted the attention of local residents, who alerted the Prussian authorities, and he was captured outside Landau. A strip search found nothing suspicious on his person, and despite being whipped by Prussian soldiers, he refused to betray his mission. Brought before the local Prussian commander, General Zoegli, he again refused to talk and was imprisoned. After 24 hours of captivity, Tarrare relented and explained the scheme to his captors. He was chained to a latrine, and eventually, 30 hours after being swallowed, the wooden box emerged. Zoegli was furious when the documents, which Tarrare had said contained vital intelligence, transpired only to be de Beauharnais's dummy-message, and Tarrare was taken to a gallows and the noose placed around his neck. (Some sources state that General Zoegli never retrieved the box, as Tarrare had the presence of mind to recover and eat the stool containing it before it could be seized by the Prussians.) At the last minute, Zoegli relented, and Tarrare was taken down from the scaffold, given a severe beating, and released near the French lines.

== Attempted cures ==
Following this incident, Tarrare was desperate to avoid further military service, and returned to the hospital, telling Percy that he would attempt any possible cure for his appetite. Percy treated him with laudanum without success; further treatments with wine vinegar and tobacco pills were likewise unsuccessful. Following these failures, Percy fed Tarrare large quantities of soft-boiled eggs, but this also failed to suppress his appetite. Efforts to keep him on any kind of controlled diet failed; he would sneak out of the hospital to scavenge for offal outside butchers' shops and to fight stray dogs for rotting meat in gutters, alleys and rubbish heaps. He was also caught several times within the hospital drinking from patients undergoing bloodletting, and attempting to eat the bodies in the hospital's morgue. Other doctors believed that Tarrare was mentally ill and pressed for him to be transferred to a lunatic asylum, but Percy was keen to continue his experiments and Tarrare remained in the military hospital.

After some time, a 14-month-old toddler disappeared from the hospital, and Tarrare was immediately suspected of having consumed the child due to his past behaviour of eating small animals. Percy was unable or unwilling to defend him, and the hospital staff chased Tarrare from the hospital, to which he never returned.

== Death ==
In 1798, M. Tessier of Versailles hospital contacted Percy to notify him that a patient of theirs wished to see him. It was Tarrare, now bedridden and weak. Tarrare told Percy that he had swallowed a golden fork two years earlier, which he believed was now lodged inside him and causing his current weakness. He hoped that Percy could find some way to remove it. Percy, however, recognised that he had advanced tuberculosis. A month later, Tarrare began to experience continuous exudative diarrhoea, dying shortly afterwards.

The corpse rotted quickly; the surgeons of the hospital refused to dissect it. Tessier, however, wanted to find out how Tarrare's intestines differed from those of a normal person; he was also curious as to whether the gold fork was lodged inside him. At the autopsy, Tarrare's oesophagus was found to be abnormally wide, and when his jaws were opened surgeons could see down a broad canal into the stomach. His body was found to be filled with pus, his liver and gallbladder were abnormally large, and his stomach was enormous, covered in ulcers and filling most of his abdominal cavity. No fork was found.

== See also ==
- List of incidents of cannibalism
- Charles Domery, a Polish soldier in Prussian and French armies who exhibited similar symptoms
- Michel Lotito, a French entertainer known as Monsieur Mangetout (Mr "Eat-All")
- Jacques de Falaise, a French quarryman known for his ability to eat various objects

== General sources ==
- Bondeson, Jan (2006), Freaks: The Pig-Faced Lady of Manchester Square & Other Medical Marvels, Stroud: Tempus Publishing, ISBN 0-7524-3662-7
- Bondeson, Jan (2004), The Two-Headed Boy, and Other Medical Marvels, Ithaca, NY: Cornell University Press, ISBN 0-8014-8958-X
- Good, John Mason (1864), The Study of Medicine (15th ed.), New York: Harper & Brothers
- Lord, Perceval B. (1839), Popular Physiology (2nd ed.), London: John W. Parker / Society for Promoting Christian Knowledge
- Millingen, J. G. (1839), Curiosities of Medical Experience (2 ed.), London: Richard Bentley, OCLC 15518
