= Polyphagia =

Abnormally strong sensation of hunger or desire to eat

- Other names: Hyperphagia
- Specialty: Endocrinology, Psychiatry

Polyphagia, or hyperphagia, is an abnormally strong, incessant sensation of hunger or desire to eat often leading to overeating. In contrast to an increase in appetite following exercise, polyphagia does not subside after eating and often leads to rapid intake of excessive quantities of food. Polyphagia is not a disorder by itself; rather, it is a symptom indicating an underlying medical condition. It is frequently a result of abnormal blood glucose levels (both hyperglycemia and hypoglycemia), and, along with polydipsia and polyuria, it is one of the "3 Ps" commonly associated with uncontrolled diabetes mellitus.

== Etymology ==
The word polyphagia (/ˌpɒliˈfeɪdʒiə/) uses combining forms of poly- + -phagia, from the Greek words πολύς (polys), "very much" or "many", and φᾰ́γω (phago), "eating" or "devouring".

== Underlying conditions and possible causes ==
Polyphagia is one of the most common symptoms of diabetes mellitus. It is associated with hyperthyroidism and endocrine diseases, e.g., Graves' disease, and it has also been noted in Prader–Willi syndrome and other genetic conditions caused by chromosomal anomalies. It is only one of several diagnostic criteria for bulimia and is not by itself classified as an eating disorder. As a symptom of Kleine–Levin syndrome, it is sometimes termed megaphagia.

Impaired leptin signaling in vagal nerve receptors has been shown to cause hyperphagia.

Changes in hormones associated with the female menstrual cycle can lead to extreme hunger right before the period. Spikes in estrogen and progesterone and decreased serotonin can lead to cravings for carbohydrates and fats.

Polyphagia is found in the following conditions:

- Chromosome 22q13 duplication syndrome
- Chromosome 2p25.3 deletion (MYT1L syndrome)
- Chromosome Xq26.3 duplication syndrome
- Congenital generalized lipodystrophy, types 1 and 2
- Diabetes mellitus type 1
- Familial renal glucosuria
- Frontotemporal dementia
- Frontotemporal dementia, ubiquitin-positive
- Graves' disease
- Hypotonia-cystinuria syndrome
- Kleine–Levin syndrome
- Leptin deficiency or dysfunction
- Leptin receptor deficiency
- Luscan–Lumish syndrome
- Macrosomia adiposa congenita
- Intellectual developmental disorder, autosomal dominant 1
- Obesity, hyperphagia, and developmental delay (OBHD)
- Rapid-onset obesity with hypothalamic dysregulation, hypoventilation, and autonomic dysregulation (ROHHAD syndrome)
- Pick's disease
- Prader–Willi syndrome
- Proopiomelanocortin deficiency
- Schaaf–Yang syndrome

== In diabetes ==
Diabetes mellitus causes a disruption in the body's ability to transfer glucose from food into energy. Polyphagia in type 2 diabetes is usually not as apparent as the polyphagia in type 1 diabetes. In type 1 diabetes, it probably results from cellular starvation and the depletion of cellular stores of carbohydrates, fats, and proteins.

== See also ==
- Anorexia
- Binge eating
- Charles Domery
- Compulsive overeating
- Counterregulatory eating
- Eating disorder
- Effects of cannabis
- Erysichthon of Thessaly
- Hedonic hunger
- Tarrare
