= Jean Baptiste Félix Descuret =

French psychiatrist

Jean Baptiste Félix Descuret (5 June 1795 – 27 November 1871) was a French physician and author who was a native of Chalon-sur-Saône. He studied and practiced medicine in Paris, and afterwards worked in Châtillon-d'Azergues.

== Writing career ==
Descuret is known primarily through his written works. His best known book is an early psychosocial study called Médecine des passions, ou les passions considérées dans leurs rapports avec les maladies, les lois et la religion, which roughly translates to "The Passions' Medicine, or passions considered in their relationship to disease, laws and religion". It was published in 1841, and was the result of Descuret's interaction with many thousands of patients in Paris. It was a discussion about the diverse passions and vices of his patients from a medical, religious and economic standpoint.

Another noted work was the 1856 Les Merveilles du corps humain (Marvels of the Human Body), which concerned the relationship of medicine to morals and religion, and was written to be studied by clergymen and students of philosophy.
