= Michel Lotito =

French entertainer (1950–2006)

- Lotito eating parts of a Cessna 150 aircraft
- Born: Michel Dominique Lotito; 16 June 1950; Villard-Bonnot, France
- Died: 25 June 2007 (aged 57); Grenoble, France
- Resting place: Saint Roch Cemetery, Grenoble
- Other name: Monsieur Mangetout
- Occupation: Entertainer
- Known for: Eating unusual objects

Michel Lotito (French pronunciation: [miʃɛl lɔtito]; 16 June 1950 – 25 June 2007) was a French entertainer famous for deliberate consumption of normally indigestible objects. He came to be known as Monsieur Mangetout (lit. 'Mister Eats-All'). His digestive system allowed him to consume up to 900 g (2.0 lb) of metal per day. He started eating this unusual diet at age 16.

== Career ==
Michel Lotito began eating unusual material at 16 years of age, and he performed publicly beginning in 1966, around the age of 16. He had an eating disorder known as pica, a psychological disorder characterised by an appetite for substances that are largely non-nutritive. Doctors determined that Lotito also had a thick lining in his stomach and intestines, which allowed his consumption of sharp metal without suffering injury. Lotito also had digestive juices that were unusually powerful, meaning that he could digest the unusual materials. Soft foods, such as bananas, gave him heartburn, specifically when he had metal in his stomach.

Lotito's performance involved the consumption of metal, glass, rubber, and other materials. He disassembled, cut up into small pieces, and consumed items such as bicycles, shopping carts, televisions, beds, and a Cessna 150, among other items. It took him roughly 2 years, from 1978 to 1980, to eat the Cessna 150. (Note: In 2022, Madison Dapcevich of Snopes, a fact-checking website, investigated Lotito's claim that he ate an entire airplane. She concluded that although there are many accounts of Lotito's consumption of unusual objects and that he "very likely" consumed such objects on stage as a professional entertainer, she was unable to confirm that Lotito ate an entire airplane (or even part of one).)

Lotito claimed not to suffer ill effects from his consumption of substances typically considered poisonous. When performing, he ingested approximately 1 kilogram (2.2 lb) of material daily, preceding it with mineral oil and drinking considerable quantities of water during the meal; this allowed him to swallow the metal without damaging his throat. It is estimated that between 1959 and 1997, he "had eaten nearly nine tons of metal." He did not have any digestive problems as a result of his unusual diet.

== Awards ==
Lotito holds the record for the "strangest diet" in the Guinness World Records. He was awarded a plaque, made of brass, by the publishers to commemorate his abilities. He ate his award.

== Death ==
Lotito died of natural causes at age 57 on 25 June 2007, in Grenoble.

== List of unusual items allegedly consumed ==
At least:

- 45 door hinges
- 18 bicycles
- 15 shopping carts
- 7 television sets
- 6 chandeliers
- 2 beds
- 1 pair of skis
- 1 computer
- 1 copy of the textbook Gravitation by Misner, Thorne, and Wheeler
- 1 Cessna 150 light aircraft
- 1 waterbed
- 500 metres (1,600 ft) of steel chain
- 1 coffin (with handles)
- 1 Guinness World Records award plaque
- Assorted razors and bolts

== In popular culture ==
- The Man Who Ate the 747 (2000) is the debut novel of Ben Sherwood. It follows a record keeper for The Book of Records who discovers a farmer attempting to romantically impress a woman by gradually eating a Boeing 747. The novel was heavily inspired by The Guinness Book of World Records; Sherwood interviewed Lotito via telephone as part of his research.
- How to Eat an Airplane (2016) is a picture book based on Lotito, written by Peter Pearson and illustrated by Mircea Catusanu.

== See also ==
- John Fasel – American freak show performer (born c.1881)
- Tarrare – French showman and voracious eater (c. 1772–1798)
