= The Human Aquarium =

The Human Aquarium is a nickname that referred to:

- Mac Norton (1876 – 1953), French vaudeville performance artist and magician
- Hadji Ali (1888–1892 – 1937), vaudeville performance artist of Egyptian descent
