= Coro =

Coro or CORO may refer to:

== Entertainment ==
- Coro (Berio), a composition by Luciano Berio
- Coro (music), Italian for choir
- Coro TV, Venezuelan community television channel
- Omweso (Coro), mancala game played in the Lango region of Uganda
- Coro, The Sixteen's record label

== People ==
- Coro (footballer), Spanish footballer
- Coro (singer), Dominican singer and actor

== Places ==
- Coro, Venezuela, the capital city of Falcón State
- Coro Coro Municipality
- Coro Gulf
- Coro Province, historic province of Gran Colombia
- Coro region, a geographical region of Venezuela
- Coromandel Valley, a suburb of Adelaide, South Australia, commonly referred to as Coro

== Other ==
- Coro (non-profit organization), teaches leadership skills to young adults
- Corocraft, costume jewelry makers of the early 20th century
- Coroutine
