= Water spouting =

Sideshow regurgitation act

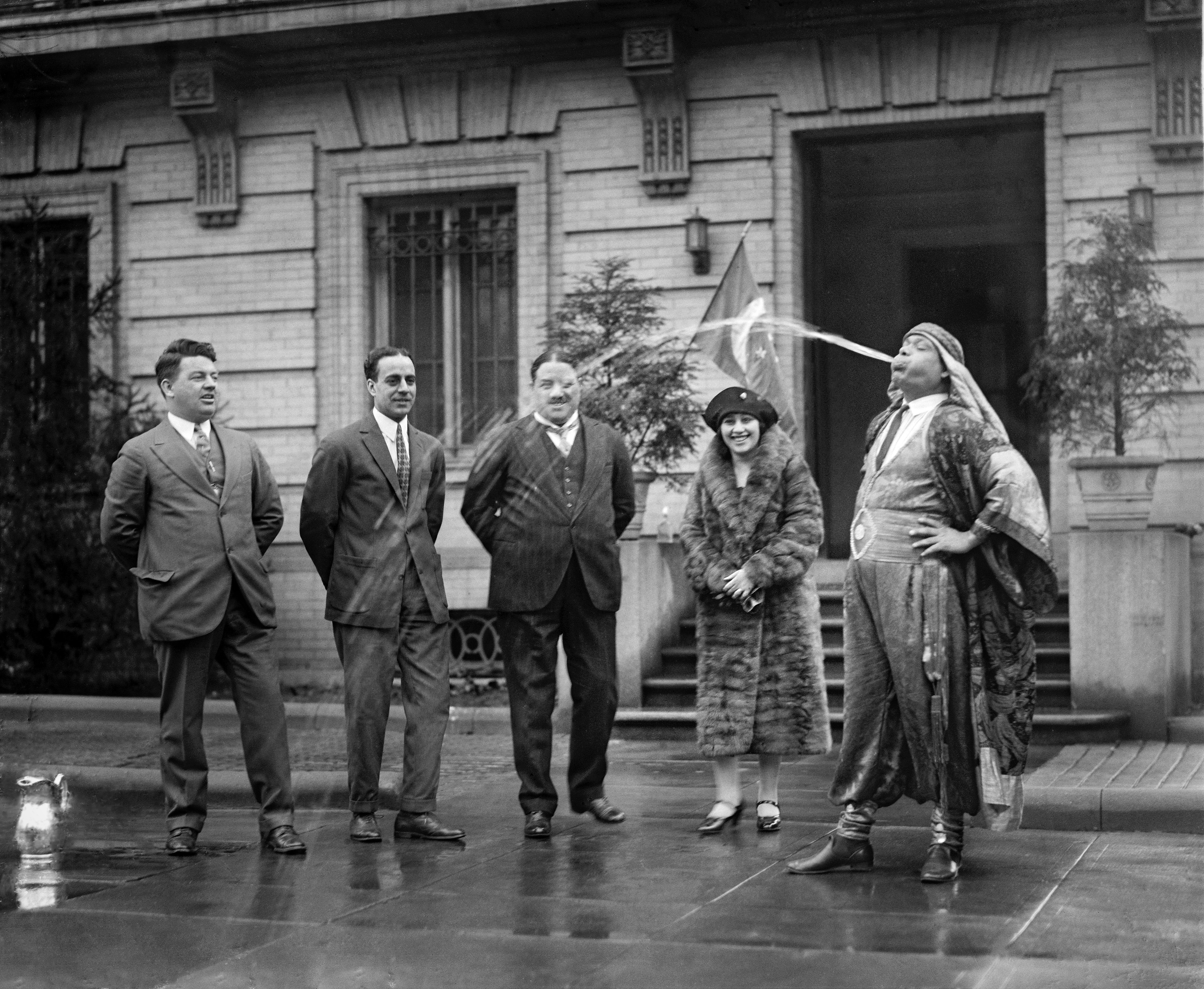
Hadji Ali, known for numerous acts of water spouting

Water spouting is a sideshow regurgitation act, in which a performance artist drinks a large amount of fluid, such as water, and regurgitates it in a controlled manner with muscle control. Typically, the act includes an element of stage magic in the transformation of the fluid; for example, ingesting water and regurgitating it as a stream of red wine or milk.

== History ==
Water spouting has been performed since the 17th century. During this time, performance artists such as Jean Royer (fl. 1657) and Blaise Manfre were known for their spouting technique.

Floram Marchand performed a "water to wine" trick, where he would drink 30 glasses of water on stage, then spout glasses of red "wine". He had actually swallowed red dye in advance, in order to give the appearance of wine.

The act was revived by vaudeville artist Hadji Ali (d. 1937). Ali was known to drink water and then kerosene which he would use to start a fire and then extinguish it. Other performers during this time include Mac Norton, who was billed as the "Human Aquarium" due to his swallowing and regurgitating of goldfish and frogs. The German performer Dagomarr Rochmann, known as the "Great Waldo", swallowed and regurgitated jewellery, coins, lemons, and mice. Waldo performed at Robert Ripley's Odditorium in New York City.

David Blaine performed Ali's water and kerosene act on Jimmy Kimmel Live! in November 2013. Blaine explained the process he took to emulate Ali on the show David Blaine: Real or Magic. A British magician Kieron Johnson, also known as the "human fountain" has been performing this act on his TikTok and YouTube account. In 2018 he performed it on German talent show where he was water spouting over judges. He can also swallow and regurgitate small objects, like coins and bring them up on either heads or tails, chosen by the audience.

== See also ==
- Rumination syndrome
- Md. Ahasan Habib
