= Joseff =

Joseff could be both a masculine given name and a surname. Notable people with the name include:

- Joseff Gnagbo (born c. 1974), Ivorian-born Welsh activist
- Joseff John Morrell (born 1997), English-born footballer
- Eugene Joseff, founder of Joseff of Hollywood
- Joan Castle Joseff (1912–2010), American jeweler and businesswoman

== See also ==
- Joseph, masculine given name
