= Hadji Ali =

Egyptian vaudeville performer (c. 1890–1937)

- حاج علي
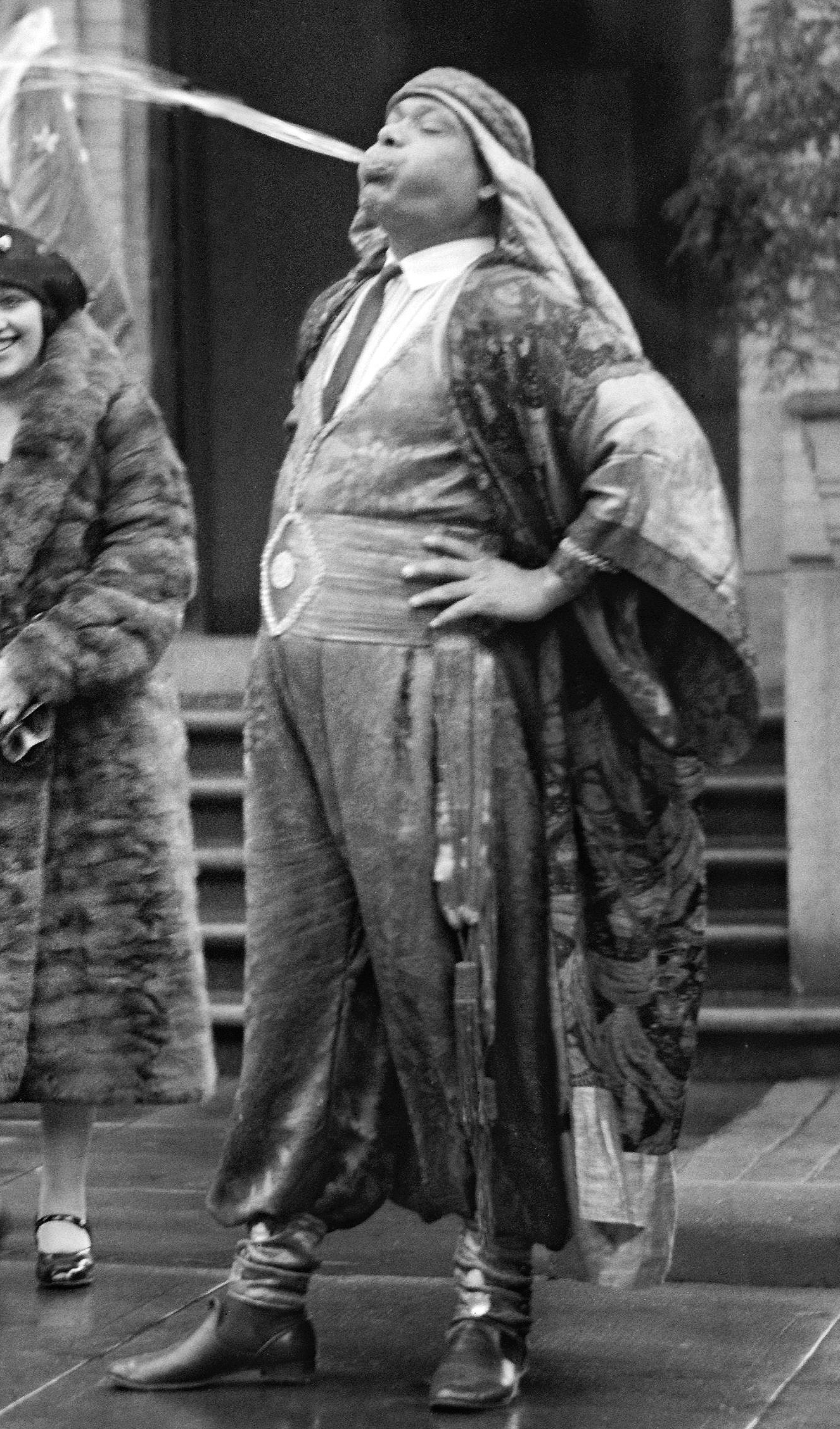
- Ali demonstrating his skills, c. 1927
- Born: c. 1888–1892; Khedivate of Egypt
- Died: November 5, 1937 (aged 45–49); Wolverhampton, England
- Resting place: Kensico Cemetery, Valhalla, New York
- Other names: The Great Egyptian Miracle Man; The Amazing Regurgitator; The Egyptian Enigma; The Human Volcano; The Human Aquarium; The 9th Wonder of the Scientific World
- Occupation: Vaudeville performance artist

Hadji Ali (Arabic: حاج علي; c. 1888–1892 – November 5, 1937) was a vaudeville performance artist, thought to be of Egyptian descent, who was famous for acts of controlled regurgitation. His best-known feats included water spouting, smoke swallowing, and swallowing nuts and handkerchiefs before disgorging them in an order chosen by the audience. Ali's most famous stunt, and the highlight of his act, was drinking copious amounts of water followed by kerosene, and then acting by turns as a human flamethrower and fire extinguisher as he expelled the two liquids onto a theatrical prop. While these stunts were performed, a panel of audience members was invited to watch the show up close to verify that no trickery was employed.

Although he never gained wide fame, Ali had a dedicated following on the vaudeville circuit in the United States. He performed for heads of state including Tsar Nicholas II of Russia. Judy Garland named him her favorite vaudevillian and David Blaine identified Ali as his favorite magician. Portions of his act were captured in the short film Strange as It Seems (1930) and in Politiquerias (1931), the Spanish-language version of Laurel and Hardy's Chickens Come Home. Two documentaries contain footage of Ali taken from Politiquerias: 1977's Gizmo!, and 1999's Vaudeville. Ali's unusual gastric abilities led to rumors that the Rockefeller Institute had offered a large sum of money to obtain his stomach post-mortem. After he died in England, his body was offered to Johns Hopkins University for study, though the offer was declined.

== Background ==
Hadji Ali was born into a working-class family in approximately 1888 or 1892, depending on the source consulted, probably in Egypt. His fame was as a practitioner of a recognized vaudeville subgenre known as a "regurgitation act", involving the swallowing of material or objects and their regurgitation in various ways. Ali became aware as a child that he possessed an unusual gastric ability. He explained in response to audience questions at a performance held at St. Mary's Hospital in Niagara Falls, New York, in May 1926, that while swimming in the Nile as a ten-year-old boy, he naturally discovered that he could swallow a large amount of water and blow it out like a whale spouting. He continued to develop and refine the ability as he grew older. A more dramatic version of these events was provided by Ali's daughter, Almina Ali, in an interview in England after his death. She stated that his abilities were first learned through a single incident: while bathing in the Nile, he inadvertently swallowed a fish and an ample volume of water. Instead of dying, as those present thought he might, Ali simply regurgitated the liquid and the fish without ill effect.

Ali learned that his regurgitation talents had the potential to entertain and to earn money through performance at the age of fifteen:

I tried out my tricks first of all in the street, swallowing many glasses of water and then pouring forth a great fountain from one side of the road to the other ... A cafe proprietor saw me doing this one day, and chased me down the street. I thought he wanted to beat me up, but no—all he did was to put a coin in my hand and ask me to repeat the trick. Finally, he was so delighted that he asked me to come to his cafe and entertain the customers.

Taking his abilities on the road, Ali met an Italian man in Cairo who signed him to a contract for music hall performances. Ali performed under contract throughout Europe and at times for heads of state. According to Ali, in or about 1914 he was summoned by Tsar Nicholas II of Russia to perform at the Winter Palace in Saint Petersburg, Russia. He stated that the Tsar "must have liked my performance because he awarded me a special decoration, which is now one of my most treasured possessions." Following World War I, Ali began managing his own affairs and toured the world, developing more tricks as he went.

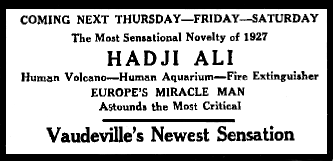
Advertisement appearing in the August 11, 1927 edition of The North Adams Evening Transcript (Massachusetts) for a Hadji Ali performance at the Empire Theater

Ali came to the United States with Almina in the mid-1920s. They performed together at fairs, carnivals and in vaudeville, sometimes advertised under the collective name, "Hadji Ali & Co." Almina played the part of assistant in her father's act, billed in his shows as "The Princess". Ali alone had a variety of stage names, including: "The Great Egyptian Miracle Man", "The Amazing Regurgitator", "The Egyptian Enigma", "The Human Aquarium", "The Human Volcano" and "The 9th Wonder of the Scientific World". Ali has been described as a "large, barrel-chested and bearded man ... [that cut] an imposing figure in his Arab costume."

Although Ali spoke a number of languages and became a naturalized U.S. citizen, it was reported that Almina acted as his interpreter in the United States and other places, as he did not speak English and was illiterate. Once he had gained some notoriety, Ali took on as his manager Hubert Julian, a former colonel in the Abyssinian Air Force. Although he developed a significant following, even being named Judy Garland's favorite vaudevillian, Ali "remained more a sideshow curiosity than a true vaudeville headliner" according to at least one source. Nevertheless, at the time of his death in 1937, Julian commented that Ali had "earned big money in America—$1,000 a week sometimes. I was building him up here [in Europe] and had a Continental tour arranged."

== Performance ==
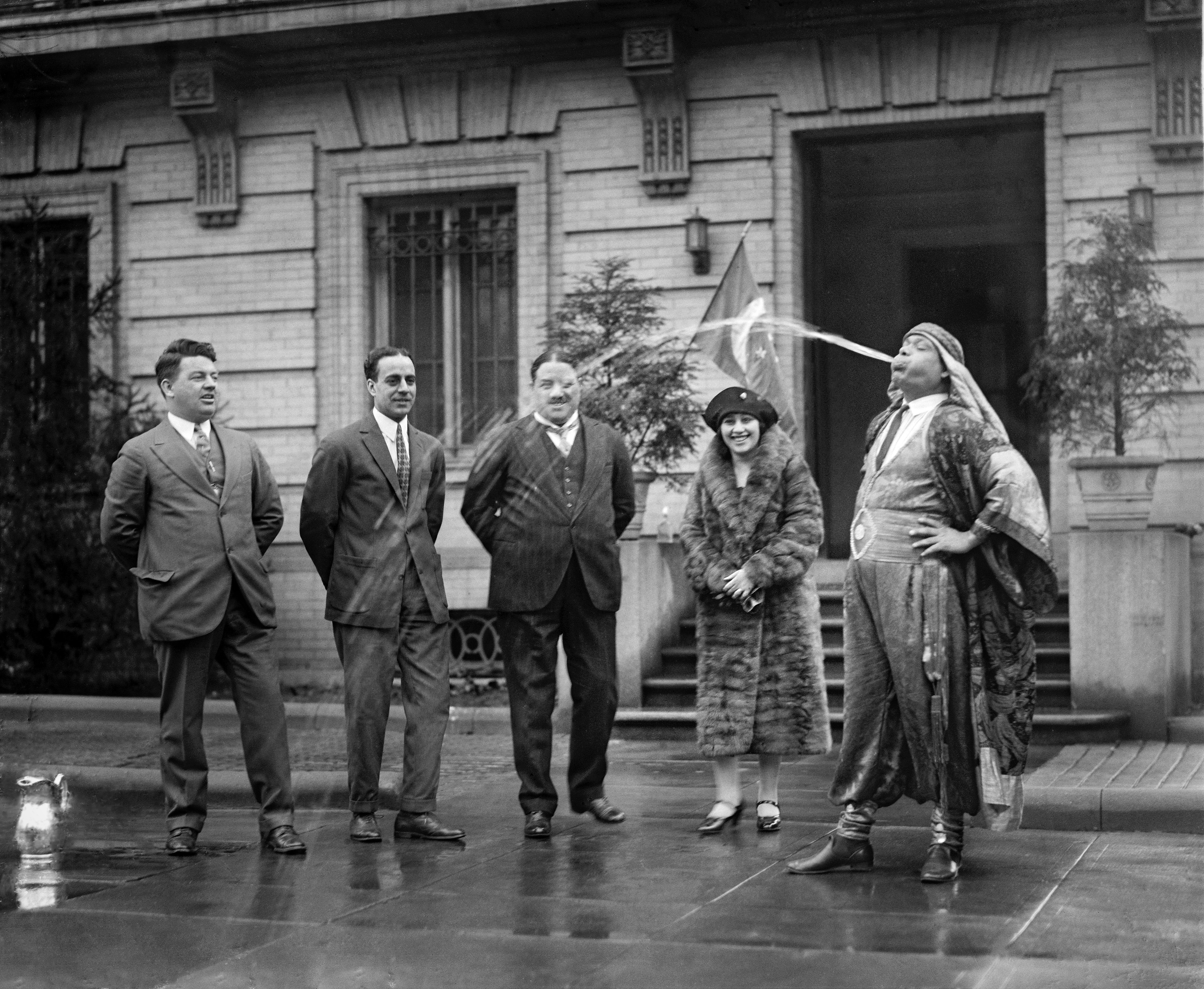
Hadji Ali demonstrating his skills, 1927

The mainstay of Ali's act was "water spouting". After swallowing large amounts of water, 60 to 100 glasses at a time, he spouted the water in a continuous stream for a sustained period of time, sometimes approaching one minute. Another common trick was to swallow 30 to 50 unshelled hazelnuts (although one of his posters advertised 40 pecans), followed by another nut of a different variety, such as an almond. Ali then brought them up one by one with the odd-nut-out produced at a mark called out by the audience. In another trick, Ali swallowed three to six handkerchiefs of different hues and then produced them in a color order requested by audience members.

In a 1929 article appearing in the Lowell Sun newspaper, physician Morris Fishbein speculated that for Ali's nut feat, the one nut of a different variety was held in the mouth rather than swallowed, thus allowing him to produce it on cue. Dr. Fishbein also stated that unnamed "investigators" were convinced that for Ali's handkerchief stunt, to produce them in the sequence stipulated by the audience Ali flavored the cloth, and could therefore taste for the correct one as he brought them up. Ali also swallowed live goldfish, watches, coins, costume jewelry, paper money, peach pits, stones, live mice, buttons, pool balls and other odd objects. In another standard performance segment, he placed eight or more lit cigarettes in his mouth but instead of inhaling, he swallowed the smoke and, after a significant time had passed, issued it forth in a steady stream like an erupting volcano.

Ali [was] the man who could swallow anything—cigarettes, live goldfish, handkerchiefs, petrol ...

— Colonel Julian, Ali's manager

Ali's longstanding finale was the swallowing of copious amounts of water again, but this time followed by a pint of kerosene. A prop was then produced, typically a model castle or house made of metal set on a table, within which a small flame burned. Lighter than water and immiscible with it, the kerosene floated above the liquid in Ali's gut, allowing him to disgorge it first. The stage thus set, and to a drum roll or an imitation of fire bells, Ali became a "human flamethrower", spewing the accelerant in a long stream over the sacrificial prop, setting it ablaze. Once the kerosene was exhausted, the water followed, streaming out his mouth in a long flow from up to six feet away, extinguishing the fire.

One can always hear a Philharmonic Symphony Orchestra. One can always see Walter Hampden or Ethel Barrymore giving their superb renditions of Shakespeare, or if one's fancy turns to box, or wrestling he can visit the new Madison Square Garden ... [but] with all due respect to the art of John McCormick, Harold Lloyd or Jack Dempsey none of them can swallow three gallons of water, or fifty hazelnuts and one almond nut and return the almond at any number called between one and fifty. Not one of them can swallow three different handkerchiefs and then restore any one of the handkerchiefs called for. And it is questionable as to their ability to drink kerosene oil. Mr. Hadji Ali can do all of these things.

— The Fredonia Censor, May 2, 1928

At some performances, a panel or "jury" from the audience was invited on stage to verify that no trick mechanism was being employed—that he was actually swallowing the items in question and delivering them back through acts of regurgitation. Sometimes Ali would stroll into the audience during his nut swallowing trick. His stomach exposed by his standard costume, he invited audience members to pat his stomach, allowing them to hear the nuts rattling within. One newspaper reported that Ali's feats, essentially controlled vomiting, were performed in "a manner without the least bit of unpleasantness or anything bordering on repulsiveness." Not everyone felt the same: at least one of Ali's engagements was cut short once the proprietor realized that the nature of the act "was killing their supper shows". Famed escapologist and magician Harry Houdini remarked in his 1920 work Miracle Mongers and Their Methods that water spouting was a "performance that could not fail to disgust a modern audience."

The abilities of Ali fascinated the public and medical authorities. As reported in a 1928 Sheboygan Press article, at one of Ali's performances a number of doctors attended and thoroughly examined him during the performance. They came away satisfied that he was actually imbibing and regurgitating the material and objects as claimed, but remained "mystified over his extraordinary performance." According to an article appearing in the Naugatuck Daily News, "Physicians of three continents have puzzled over the gastronomical mechanism of this human ostrich without success. X-ray experiments have been made during his exhibition without a plausible explanation forthcoming that satisfies the critical, in fact, the profession of surgery has thrown up its hands in amazement over this human ostrich."

== Film appearances ==
No verbal description can quite encompass the act's rich absurdity, not to mention Hadji Ali's virtuosic esophageal control.

— The Speed of Sound: Hollywood and the Talkie Revolution (1997)

Ali's act was captured in two films: the 1930 short Strange as It Seems, and Politiquerias (1931), the expanded Spanish-language version of Laurel and Hardy's Chickens Come Home. Ali also had a bit part as the "Turkish landlord" in Warner Bros.' 1932 film Scarlet Dawn starring Douglas Fairbanks Jr. and Nancy Carroll. Two documentaries contain footage of Ali taken from Politiquerias: 1977's Gizmo!, and 1999's Vaudeville, a documentary produced by KCTS-TV that exhibits 90 vaudeville acts over a two-hour running time. The documentary has since aired on the Public Broadcasting Service's American Masters series numerous times.

Speaking about the democratic nature of the vaudeville performance circuit, Vaudeville's writer and executive producer said in reference to Ali that the film "embraced everything from Caruso to a guy who threw up." By contrast, in episode 30 of the Sundance Channel television program Iconoclasts, magician David Blaine speaks enthusiastically of Ali. During the episode, Blaine shows artist Chuck Close Ali's kerosene and water finale footage from Politiquerias and comments that Ali is his "favorite magician ... it's real but nobody's been able to do it since ... his name was Hadji Ali ... he's my favorite of all time."

== Death ==
Ali died on November 5, 1937, in Wolverhampton, England, from heart failure during a bout of bronchitis. Even before his death, a rumor had circulated that the Rockefeller Institute sought to procure Ali's stomach upon his death and would pay as much as $50,000 for it. This claim appeared in a poster advertising Ali's impending appearance at a theater during his lifetime. After Ali's death was reported, the rumor resurfaced as an active offer of $10,000. When a Rockefeller Institute manager was interviewed about the story, he said the offer had never been made but that nevertheless, "we should very much like to see the body." Almina and Julian transported Ali's body back to the United States on board the Queen Mary. According to a November 29, 1937 article in the New York Post, upon their arrival, Almina offered her father's body to Maryland's Johns Hopkins University for investigation by surgeons, after which it would be transported to Egypt for interment in a mausoleum. However, The Afro-American newspaper reported on December 11, 1937 that Johns Hopkins's officials had declined the offer.

He was eventually buried on December 9, 1937, at Kensico Cemetery in Valhalla, New York.

== See also ==
- Jacques de Falaise – French man with ingestion skills (1754–1825)
- Le Pétomane – French professional farter (1857–1945)
- Stevie Starr – Scottish professional regurgitator (born 1962)

== Notes ==
1. A number of online and book sources give Ali's year of birth as 1892 or approximately 1892. However, Ali's daughter stated to reporters after her father's death in 1937 that "he was only forty-nine".
2. Ali's entry in Vaudeville, Old & New: An Encyclopedia of Variety Performers in America speculates that "Hadji Ali" may have been an alias or a simplification of an unknown birth name, and that there was little proof he was actually from Egypt.
3. The ten years of age figure is attributed to an interview Ali gave to a correspondent for The Morning Bulletin while performing in Australia. By contrast, after her father died, Almina Ali was quoted in The Gleaner as stating he had first learned of his abilities at seven years of age.
4. According to the United States Consumer Price Index, a $1,000 per week salary in 1937 translates to approximately $22,400 per week as of 2025.
5. "Human Ostrich" in this passage refers to the conventional wisdom that ostriches will "eat anything". While ostriches may be more selective than the adage provides, they are known to indiscriminately swallow shiny objects and to eat small rocks naturally as an aid in their digestive process. When one Australian newspaper described Ali and other regurgitators in like fashion, the expression became "Human Emus".
