= Dagmar Rothman =

German performance artist

- Born: Dagobert Röhmann; 1920; Germany
- Died: 1952 (aged approx. 32); Bradford, Pennsylvania
- Other name: "The Great Waldo"
- Occupation: German performance artist

Dagmar Rothman (1920 – 1952) born as Dagobert Röhmann was a German professional regurgitator known by his stage name The Great Waldo. He was known to be able to swallow many animals including fish, frogs, mice and rats and was able to regurgitate them at will.

== Career ==
Rothman was born in 1920 to a Jewish family living in Germany. He grew up in the 1920s and had been fond of the circus, but was considered "too unremarkable" to join. Rothman began practicing how to swallow and regurgitate objects including light bulbs, razor blades, lemons and pocket watches before moving on to live animals. In 1938, he fled to Switzerland after Adolf Hitler invaded Austria. There, he was discovered by an American sideshow talent agent and emigrated to the United States.

He performed with Ripley's Believe It or Not! where he would swallow inanimate objects and then fish, frogs, mice and later rats. He was able to swallow a series of colored balls and regurgitate them in any specific order. Rothman was impeccably dressed and was often seen in a tuxedo. He has been described as "elegant and gentle".

== Death ==
Rothman was found dead in his Bradford, Pennsylvania apartment on August 21, 1952. Reportedly, he committed suicide over a woman.

== See also ==
- Performance artist
- Professional regurgitation
