= Gustave Sherman =

Canadian/Paris couturier (1910-1984)

- Born: 1910; Montreal, Quebec
- Died: 1984
- Known for: Canadian costume jewellery maker

Guatave Sherman ("Gus") (1910 – 1984) was a Canadian costume jewellery maker who started Sherman & Company Ltd. (1949-1980). In time, his costume jewellery was sold across Canada and the United States. "Sherman is the most recognized and collectible costume jewellery in Canada," wrote a long-time collector.

== Biography ==
Sherman was born in Montreal to Jewish parents from Lithuania. He joined the Royal Canadian Air Force as a navigator during the Second World War and after he was demobbed, he worked in insurance and jewellery sales. After learning about the costume jewellery business from a friend he had known since childhood, Hy Mendelson who had bought the Canadian franchise to manufacture Jay Kel and Jay Flex in Canada, in 1949, he began Sherman & Company Ltd. in Outremont, a borough of Montreal. When it started, the company had only one employee, a Ukrainian, Dmytro ("Jimmy") Kurica was a jewellery maker who had left Jay Kel with Sherman.

Sherman was a very popular employer, he was quite concerned with their wellbeing and their experience at work. For instance, when employes fell ill for a long amount of time, their positions would be kept open for them.

Sherman made his business part of the growing market for costume jewellery, but used Swarovski crystals, new and different cuts and colours, and superior findings and plating methods by contrast with most other jewellery makers. The company's primary stone supplier was GH Ashley in Toronto.

By the 1950s, Sherman had established himself as Canada’s costume jeweler, and his work was starting to appear on runways in Paris and New York. In 1956, Dior asked him for a new crystal inspired by the northern-lights and the company responded with Aurora Borealis, a multicoloured coating over simulated crystals for the holiday season.It is still popular in his jewellery today, along with many other colours and effects.

Unfortunately Sherman's designs fell out of favour in the seventies when more sleek and minimal jewelry was largely preferred. Eventually he was forced to end production of his jewelry in 1980 after having converted his production plant to use precious matterials like gold whose price had just risen to over 300 Dollars a pound.

Sherman's jewellery has been praised for its artistic use of colour, sense of movement, three-dimensional effect, and extensive branding, which many say result in it having a sense of sophistication and elegance about it.

Around four decades after having ended production, the brand was revived by Gustave Sherman's granddaughter Genna Sherman.

== Selected public collections ==
Sherman jewellery is in the collections of the Royal Ontario Museum, Toronto (92 objects) and the Boston Museum of Fine Arts.

== Legacy ==
In 2024, the Beaverbrook Art Gallery in Fredericton, New Brunswick held an exhibition titled Gustave Sherman – Jewels of Elegance, organized by the Andrew and Laura McCain Art Gallery in Florenceville, NB.
