= Miriam Haskell =

American designer of costume jewelry (1899–1981)

- Haskell in her youth
- Born: July 2, 1899; Tell City, Indiana
- Died: July 14, 1981 (aged 82); Cincinnati, Ohio
- Education: Chicago University
- Occupations: fashion jewelry designer and manufacturer
- Known for: Affordable, colorful, ornate, frequently beaded, custom jewelry worn by many of Hollywood's stars

Miriam Haskell (July 2, 1899 – July 14, 1981) was an American designer of costume jewelry. With creative partner Frank Hess, she designed affordable pieces from 1920 through the 1960s. Her vintage items are eagerly collected and the namesake company, which first displayed her jewelry in New York City's McAlpin Hotel, continues. It is currently listed as Haskell Jewels, LLC.

== Early life ==
Haskell was born on July 2, 1899, in Tell City, Indiana, a small town on the Ohio River, approximately 80 miles southwest of Louisville, Kentucky. After high school in New Albany, where her Russian Jewish immigrant parents ran a dry-goods store, she studied for three years at Chicago University.

== Establishing her business ==
Moving to New York City in 1924 with $500 in her pocket, she opened a jewelry boutique in 1926 in the old McAlpin Hotel, and a second outlet within the year at West 57th Street. Frank Hess joined her business the same year. Despite some controversy concerning the extent to which the jewelry designs are Haskell's or Hess's (Ellman quotes Haskell's nephew's claim that she designed a great deal; Pamfiloff and others give the lion's share of credit to Hess), the two worked together until Miriam left the company; Hess continued to design for many years afterwards. In the 1930s, the company relocated to 392 Fifth Avenue; their affordable art glass, strass, and gold-plate parures were popular throughout the Great Depression, and the company went on to open boutiques at Saks Fifth Avenue and Burdine's, as well as stores in Miami and London. The Saks shop also offered pieces by Chanel.

=== Most notable clients and collectibility of her work ===
Miriam Haskell jewelry was worn for publicity shots, films, and personal use by movie stars Joan Crawford and Lucille Ball, as well as by Gloria Vanderbilt and the Duchess of Windsor. Crawford owned a set of almost every Haskell ever produced, from the 1920s through the 1960s.

Watercolors used for advertising, by Larry Austin and others, showing models wearing large Haskell pieces are also collected and a Florida dealer found many in a set of steamer trunks around 1978; Haskell's family sold her archives and samples to defray the costs of her nursing home.

Her vintage pieces can command high prices from collectors. However, her jewelry was seldom signed before 1950, and it was her brother Joseph Haskell who introduced the first regularly signed Miriam Haskell jewelry. For a very short time during the 1940s, a shop in New England did request all pieces they received be signed by Miriam - this signature being a horseshoe-shaped plaque with Miriam Haskell embossed on it. Pieces with this signature are rare.

=== Wealthiest patrons and community work ===
Haskell's clients included Florenz Ziegfeld, who decorated the chorines of his Follies with her designs; Bernard Gimbel of the department store chain; and John D. Hertz Jr., scion of the car-rental company. With Hess, she traveled in search of materials to Paris, Gablonz, Venice, and Wattens, home of Daniel Swarovski's crystal factory. She built a mansion that she called Sainte Claire Cottage on the Hudson River near Ossining. When the Ohio flooded in 1937, Haskell sent boxcars full of relief materials to New Albany, and traveled home to assist during the disaster. In World War II, she gave generously to the war effort, and asked Hess to create new patriotic metalfree jewelry designs, using natural materials and plastics.

=== Declining health, and legacy ===
The horror of World War II affected her health and emotional stability; in her fifties, she became ill, despite an adherence to health food. In 1950, she lost control of her company to her brothers. Living in an apartment on Central Park South with her widowed mother through the next decades, she became increasingly erratic in her behavior. In 1977, she moved to Cincinnati, under the care of her nephew Malcolm Dubin, and died in 1981. It was a sad ending for an exceptional life, but, as Pamfiloff writes, "Obviously, the legacy of her dream has filtered on down through the decades. It was a man's world. Designers were men. The owners of companies were men. The staff was men. The salesmen were men. It was all men. And then you had Coco Chanel, who just jumped right out there, and a couple of other women who carved out their own niche in the world. Haskell did that, too."

== Books ==
- Deanna Farnetti Cera, The Jewels of Miriam Haskell (Milan: Idea Books, 1997).
- Barbara Ellman, "The World of Fashion Jewelry" (Highland Park, IL: Aunt Louise Imports, 1986).
- Cathy Gordon and Sheila Pamfiloff, Miriam Haskell Jewelry (Atglen, PA: Schiffer, 2004).
