= Professional regurgitation =

Act of controlled regurgitation

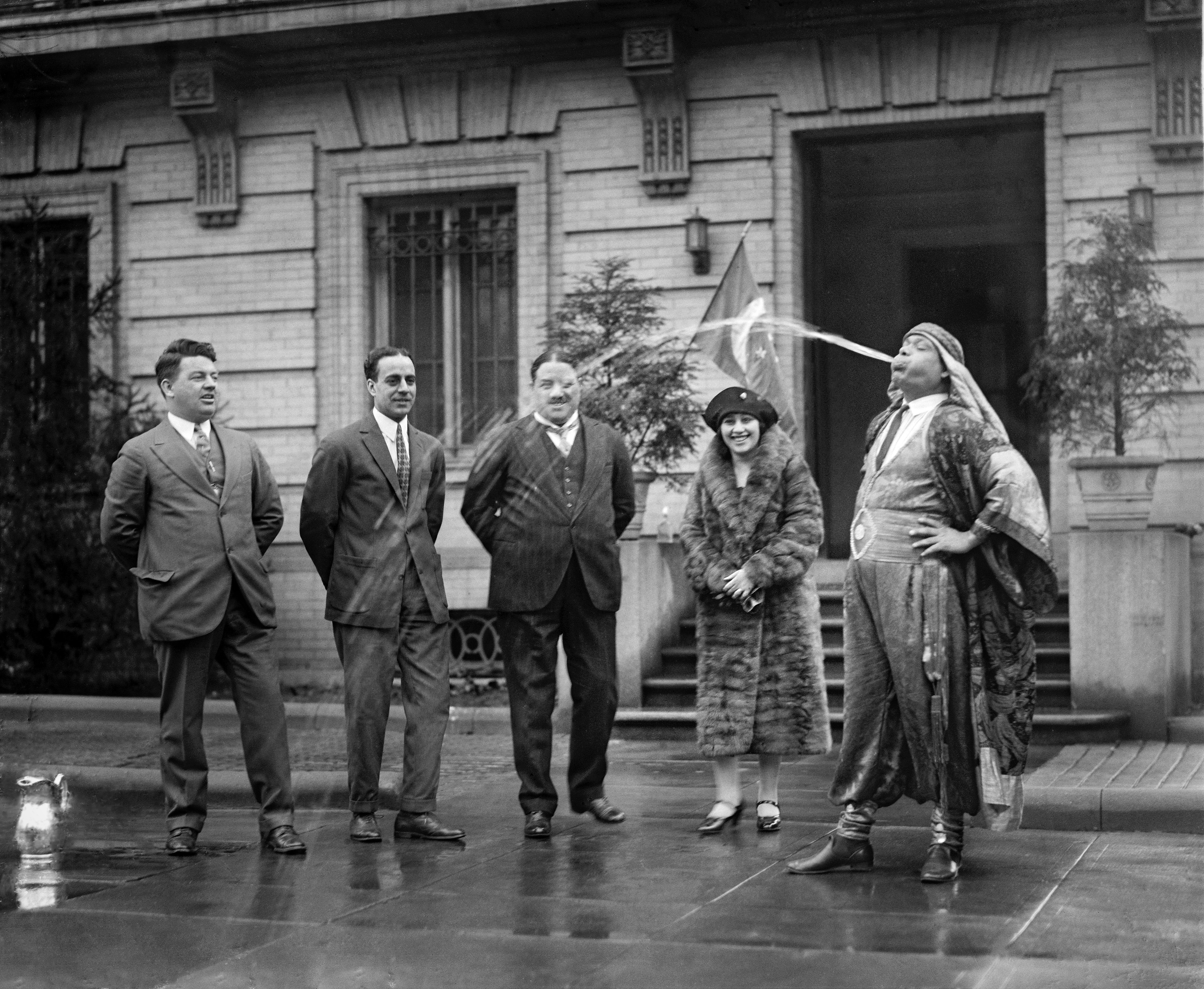
Hadji Ali, known for numerous acts of regurgitation

Professional regurgitation is the act of controlled regurgitation. The act consists of swallowing and regurgitating various unusual objects. The objects may consist of anything from live animals (live aquatic: Mac Norton; and live mice: The Great Waldo), to light bulbs, billiard balls (Stevie Starr) and kerosene (Hadji Ali). The act also includes water spouting in which a performer will drink a large amount of fluids and regurgitate them in a controlled manner.

Some magicians perform regurgitation as part of their act (for instance, Harry Houdini), but professional regurgitators may perform regurgitation exclusively. In some cases, there is debate as to whether demonstrations are true feats of regurgitation or "tricks". For example, Stevie Starr as part of his performance has swallowed an unsolved Rubik's Cube, then regurgitated a solved cube.

== See also ==
- Merycism also known as Rumination syndrome
- Jacques de Falaise
