= Stevie Starr =

Scottish performance artist (born 1962)

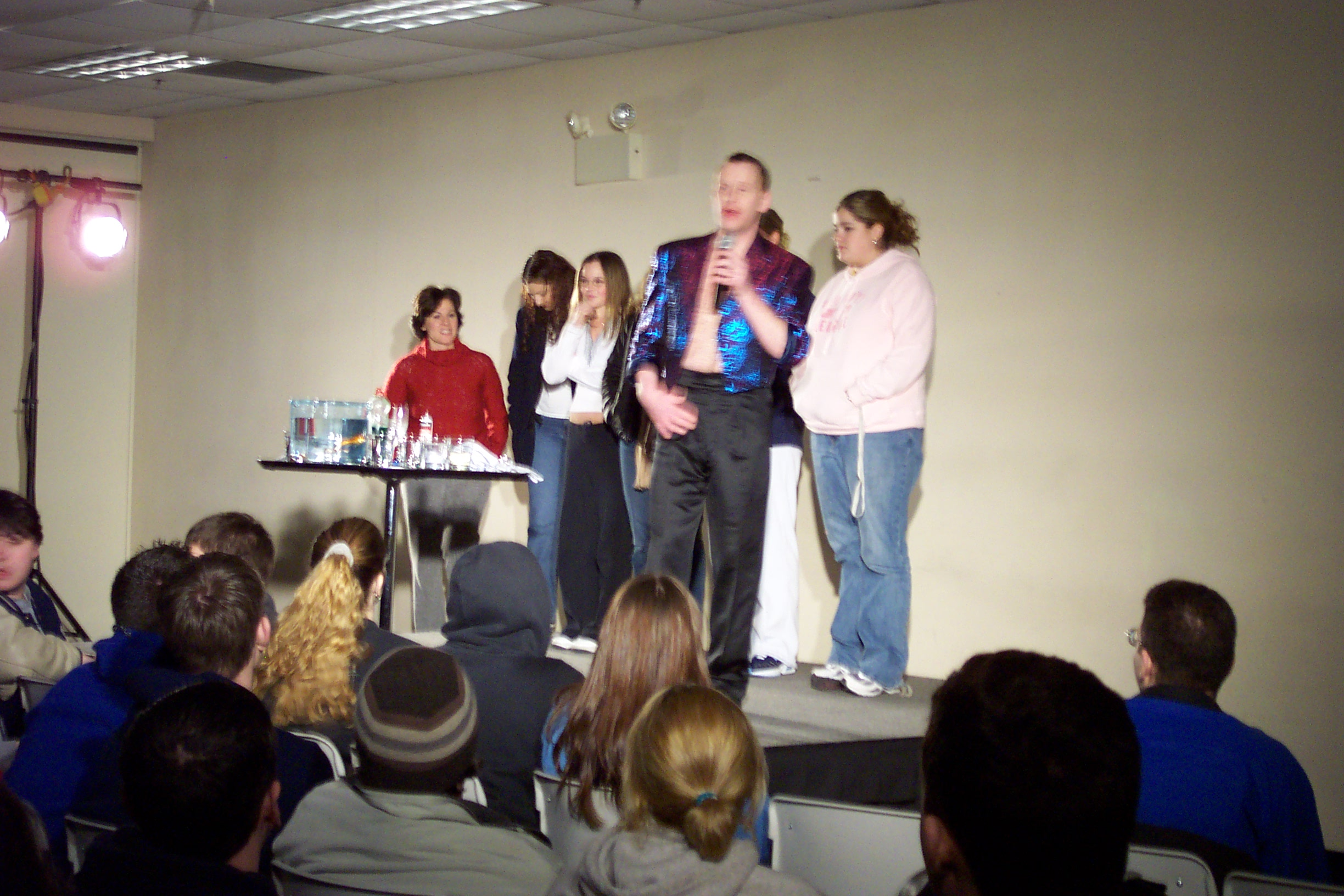
- Stevie Starr hosts a show in the Lares Building at Penn State Abington on 25 February 2003
- Born: Stephen Wright; 13 December 1962 (age 63); Glasgow, Scotland
- Occupation: Performance artist

Stephen Wright (born 13 December 1962), better known by his stage name Stevie Starr, is a Scottish performance artist who focuses on professional regurgitation. In his act, he swallows various items, such as coins, lightbulbs, balloons, nails, billiard balls, dry sugar, lighter fluid and goldfish, and then regurgitates them. The implausibility of some of his performances, such as regurgitating a "solved" Rubik's Cube, have resulted in some observers believing that he is an illusionist. Starr has a busy international touring schedule for his solo act.

== Early career ==
In 1987, Starr appeared on The Paul Daniels Magic Show, and he appeared in three episodes of The Last Resort with Jonathan Ross. In 1988, Starr appeared on Late Night with David Letterman.

In 1991, Starr appeared on The Howard Stern Show. Starr made a guest appearance on the British TV series The Secret Cabaret, in the third episode of the second series, in 1992. He appeared on Saturday Live in 1996 and Late Show with David Letterman in 1997.

== Got Talent appearances (2010–2019) ==
In April 2010, Starr auditioned for the fourth series of Britain's Got Talent. During his audition, he was swallowing numbered coins and a billiard ball and then regurgitating them on demand and in order. He progressed to the semi-finals. In those he swallowed Amanda Holden's engagement ring, followed by a locked padlock and its key. He regurgitated the padlock, which enclosed Holden's ring, followed by the key.

In September 2010, Starr performed on the 4th season of the German version of this show, Das Supertalent. He placed third in the semi-finals and advanced to the final. He finished in 7th place. Starr re-auditioned in 2018 in the hope of beating his previous position in 2010. He subsequently won the show later that year.

In October 2011, he appeared on series 2 of the Czech-Slovak version of the show, Česko Slovensko má talent, where he progressed to the final.

In October 2013, Starr appeared on series 4 of the Italian version of the show, where he progressed to the semi-finals. But he was not chosen to compete in them.

In January 2015, he appeared on series 9 of the French version of the show, La France a un incroyable talent, where he progressed to the final. He finished in 4th place.

In June 2015, he appeared as a season 10 contestant on NBC's America's Got Talent; he reached the final round, finishing in fourth place. In 2016, he also appeared as a returning contestant on America's Got Talent Holiday Spectacular. In 2019, he appeared on America's Got Talent: The Champions.

On 28 January 2019 Starr appeared on the fourth episodes of the Champions edition of America's Got Talent in Los Angeles. There he was buzzed by Simon Cowell while in the midst of appearing to swallow a razor blade. He finished the act but appeared angry, and did not place among the finalists for that evening.

On 8 February 2019 Starr appeared on the Romanian version of the show, Românii au talent, in the first episode of its 9th season. He swallowed coins, lighter gas, liquid soap, sugar and a pool ball. He won all four "yes" votes. He reached the final on 31 May 2019 but finished in last place.

On 29 September 2019 Starr appeared on the Bulgarian version of Balgariya Tarsi Talant in Sofia, Bulgaria. He swallowed a pool ball, lighter gas, sugar and coins. He won all four "yes" votes.

In December 2019, Starr appeared on the Croatian version of Supertalent in Zagreb, Croatia. He impersonated The Grinch and swallowed Christmas tree ornaments and gold dust. He won all four "yes" votes.
