= Pellet (ornithology) =

Undigested food regurgitated by some birds

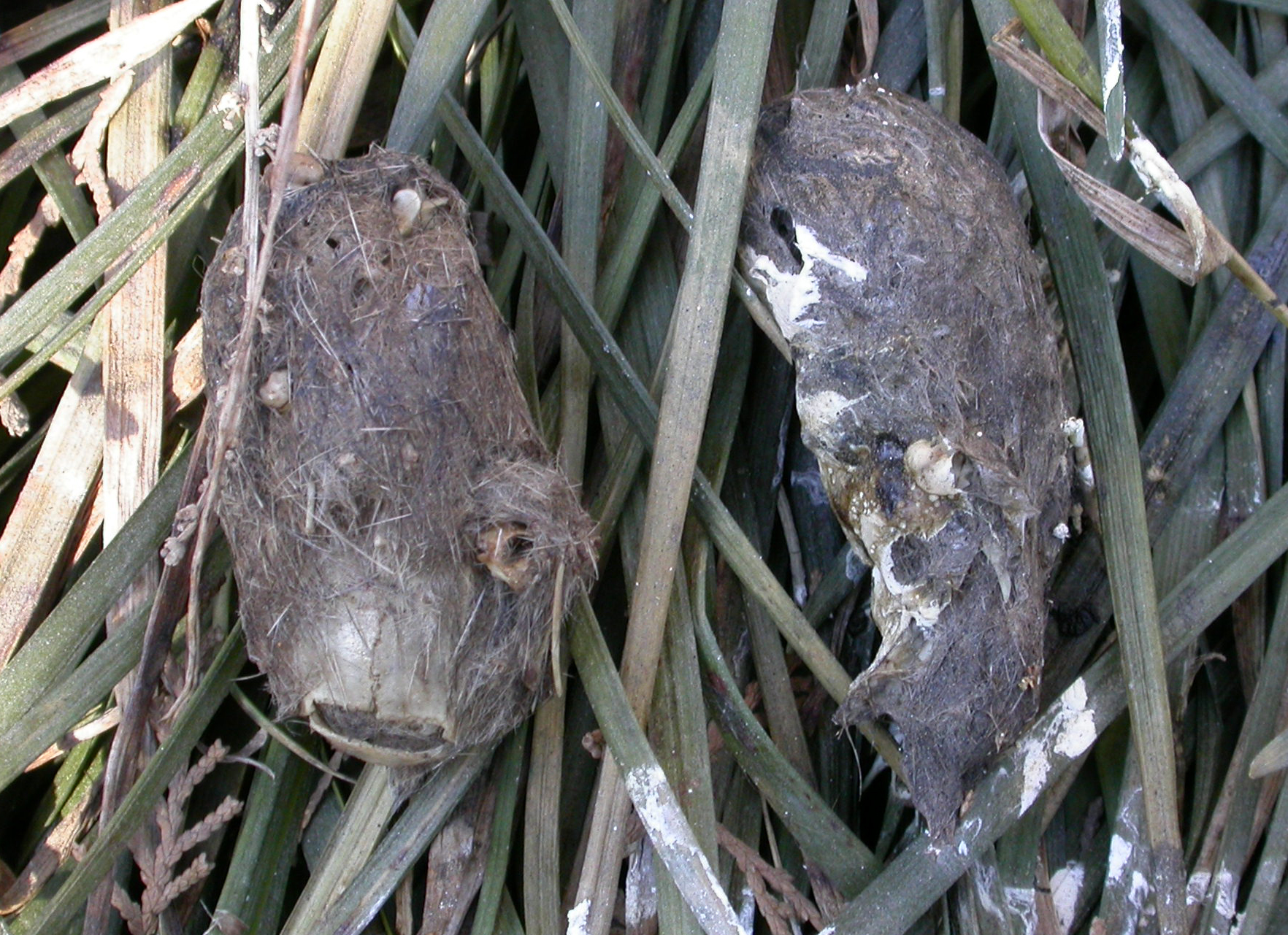
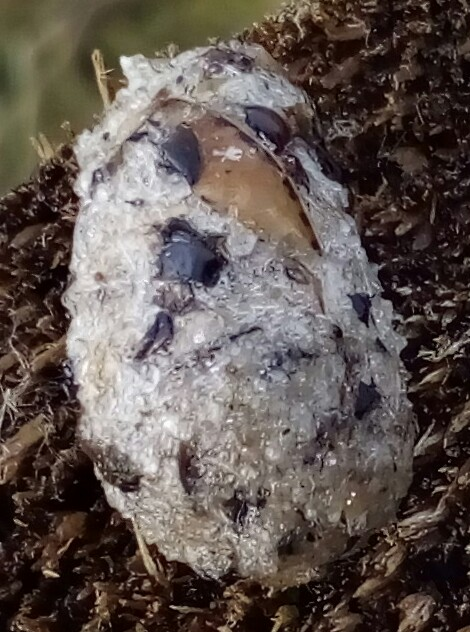
Pellets of a long-eared owl (left) and a common kingfisher (right)

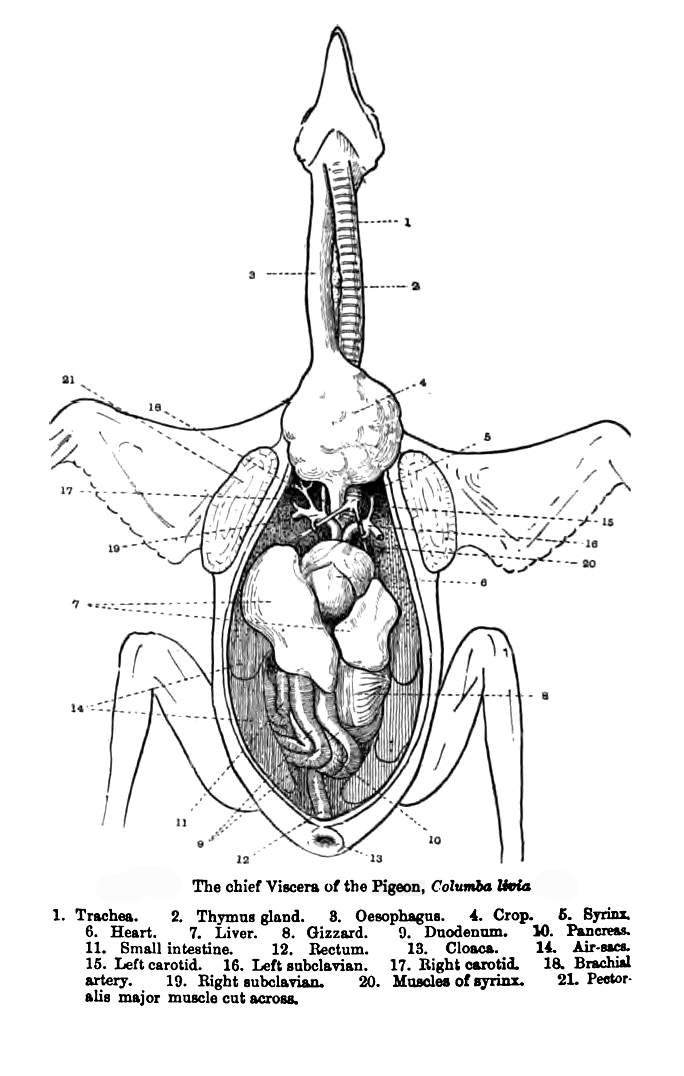
The alimentary canal of a bird.

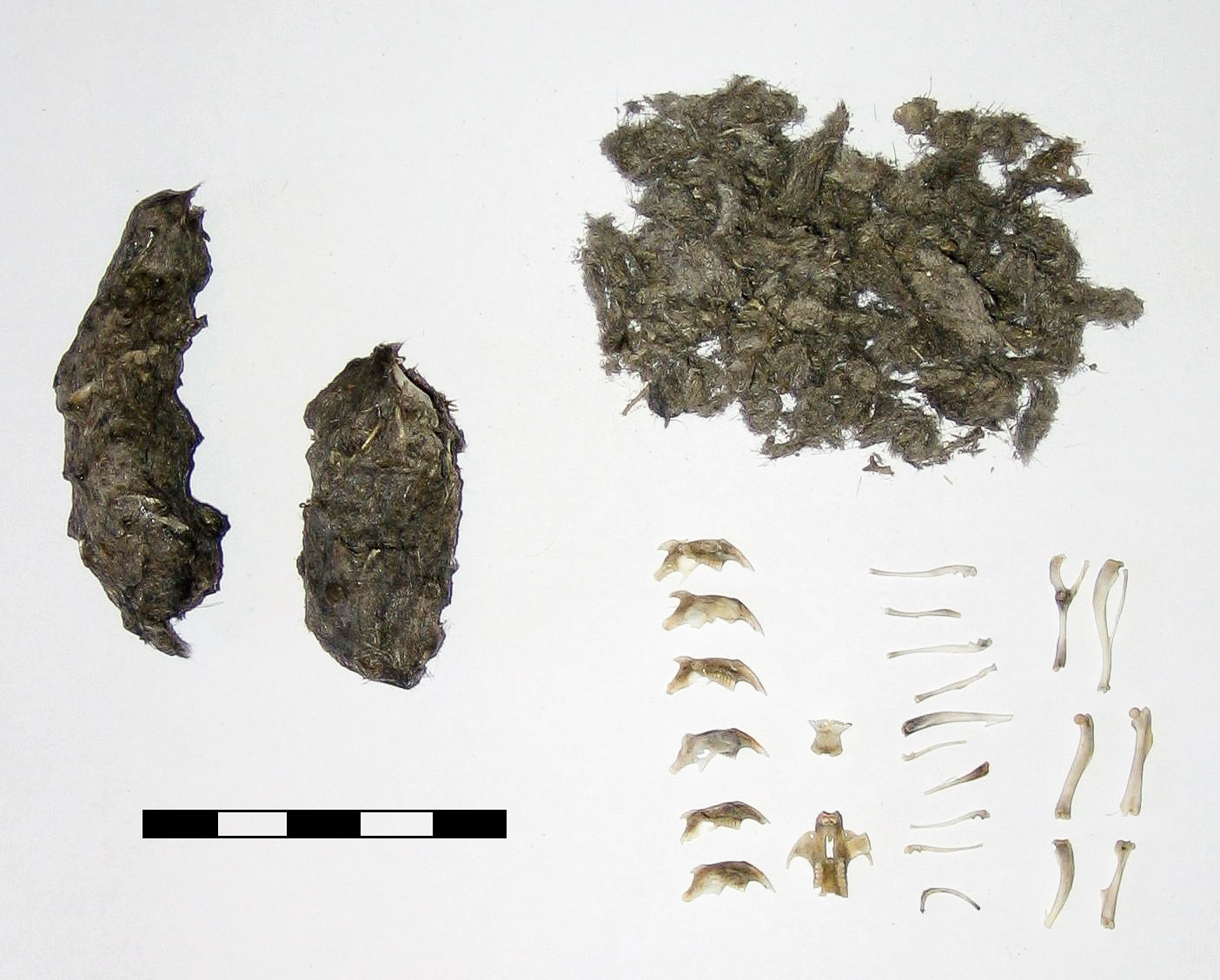
Long-eared owl pellets and rodent bones obtained from dissected pellets (1 bar = 1 cm).

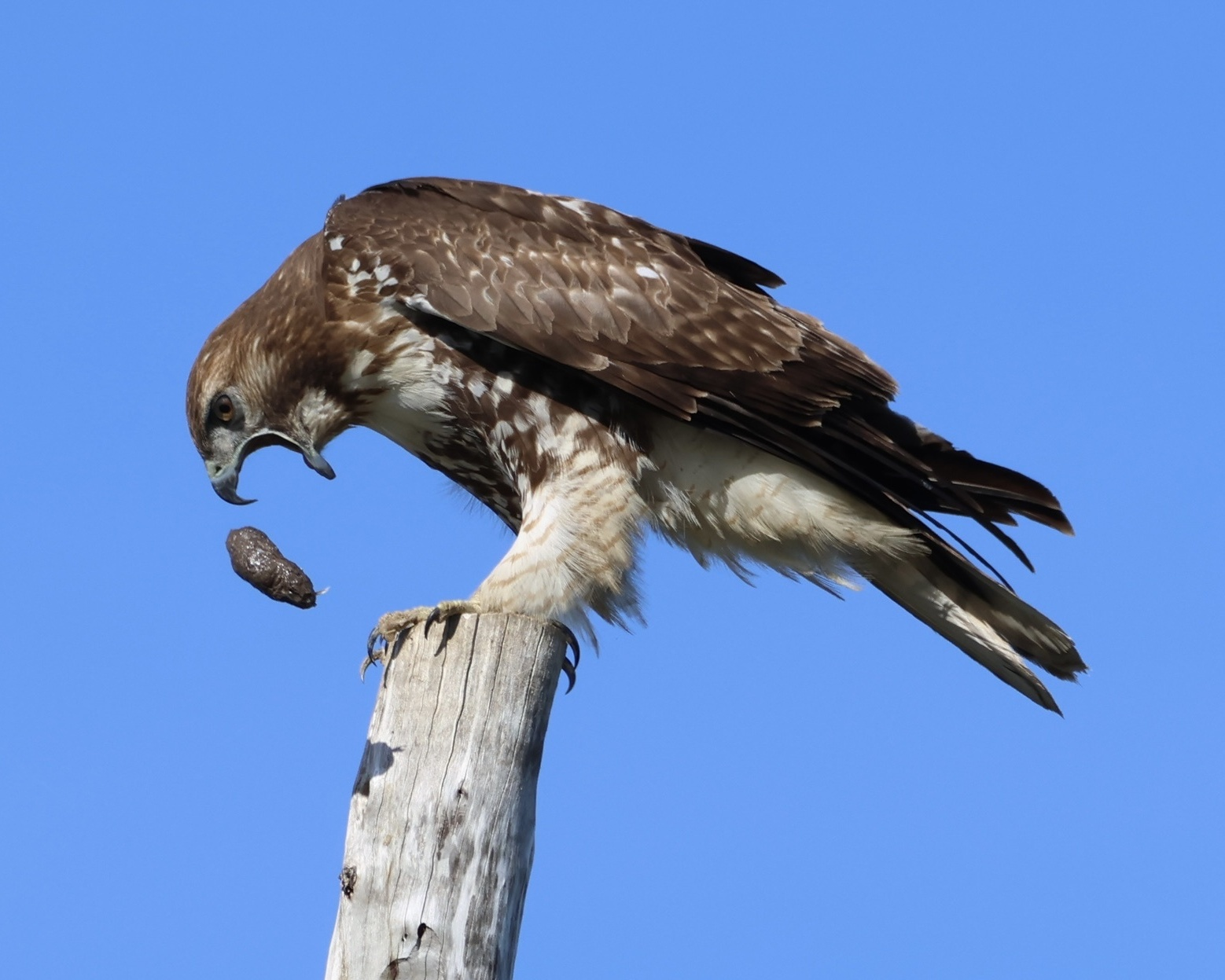
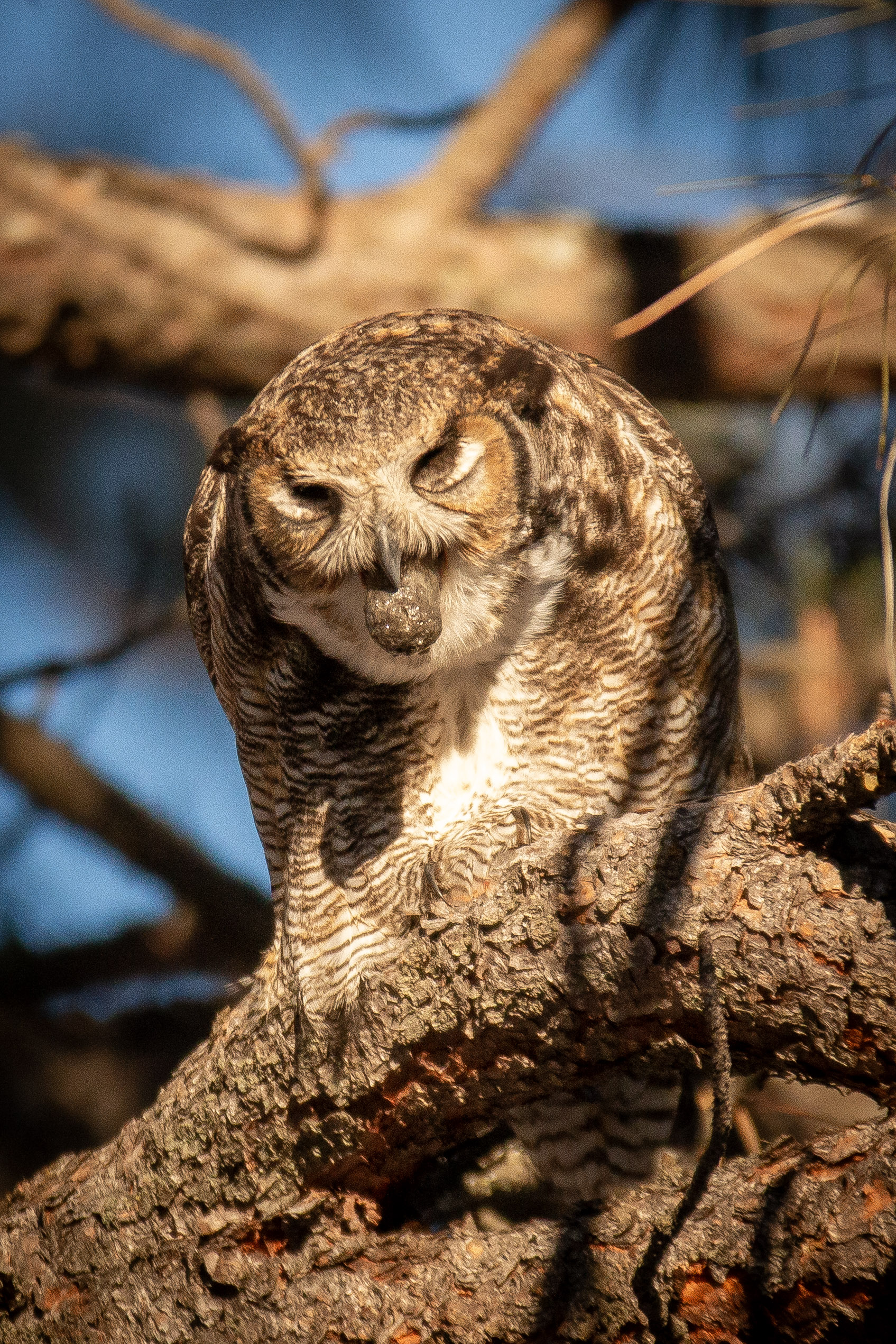
Pellets being regurgitated by a red-tailed hawk (left) and a great horned owl (right)

A pellet, in ornithology, is the mass of undigested parts of a bird's food that some bird species occasionally regurgitate. The contents of a bird's pellet depend on its diet, but can include the exoskeletons of insects, indigestible plant matter, bones, fur, feathers, bills, claws, and teeth. In falconry, the pellet is called a casting.

The passing of pellets allows a bird to remove indigestible material from its proventriculus, or glandular stomach. In birds of prey, the regurgitation of pellets serves the bird's health in another way, by "scouring" parts of the digestive tract, including the gullet. Pellets are formed within six to ten hours of a meal in the bird's gizzard (muscular stomach).

Ornithologists may collect one species' pellets over time to analyze the seasonal variation in its eating habits. One advantage of collecting pellets is that it allows for the determination of diet without the killing and dissection of the bird. Pellets are found in different locations, depending on the species. In general, these are roosting and nesting sites: for most hawks and owls, under coniferous trees; for barn owls, at the bases of cliffs or in barns and silos; for yet other species of owls, at their burrows or in marsh and field grasses.

Hawk and owl pellets are grey or brown, and range in shape from spherical to oblong or plug-shaped. In large birds, they are one to two inches long, and in songbirds, about half an inch. Many other species produce pellets, including grebes, herons, cormorants, gulls, terns, kingfishers, crows, jays, dippers, shrikes, swallows, and most shorebirds.

Ornithologists examining pellets have discovered unusual items in them—even bird bands that were once attached to a smaller species that was consumed by the predator bird. In the United States, screech owl pellets have contained bands from a tufted titmouse, black-capped chickadee, and American goldfinch. In 1966, a golden eagle pellet in Oregon was found to contain a band placed on an American wigeon four months earlier, and 1,600 km (990 mi) away in southern California.

The hair, bones and other body parts (such as limbs, skin fragments, and even faeces) of rodents found in owl pellets may carry viable rodent viruses and bacteria. For this reason, they are sometimes sterilized before study. Smith et al. described two pellet-borne outbreaks of Salmonella typhimurium in schools where unsterile pellets were dissected. Rodents tend to avoid owl pellets, apparently due to their infective potential.

== In falconry ==
In falconry, casting involves giving a hawk roughage, which is regurgitated later to purge and cleanse its crop. Hawks in the wild will produce castings of their own accord, in the form of small pellets of fur, feathers, and other indigestible material, regurgitated hours after it has eaten. Of the roughage used for falcons in captivity, there are two kinds: plumage, and cotton; the latter of which is generally in pellets about the size of hazelnuts, made of soft fine cotton, and conveyed into the hawk's gorge after supper. In the morning, the hawk will have cast them out, at which time they should be examined for color and condition to determine the state of the hawk's body. If they are cast out round, white, without stench, nor very moist, then the hawk is healthy; if otherwise, particularly black, green, slimy, or the like, the hawk is ill.

The casting of plumage is examined in the same manner. The yellow down feathers of day-old rooster chicks, which are a common diet among hawks in captivity, can be enough to induce casting. However, rabbit fur and feathers from game birds are better suited for this purpose.

Casting will occur at the same time daily, provided that hawks are flown at the same time daily. Hawks in captivity are usually weighed immediately before being flown. If they were fed roughage the previous day, they should cast it out before being weighed, to avoid an inaccurate measurement.

Casting is a necessary part of a hawk's survival. Not only does it clear out the crop, but the roughage that is regurgitated cleans bacteria from the walls of the crop. If hawks in captivity are not provided with this necessary roughage, and instead are simply fed meat, they will become seriously ill and unreleasable into the wild.
