= Joseff of Hollywood =

Jewelry firm

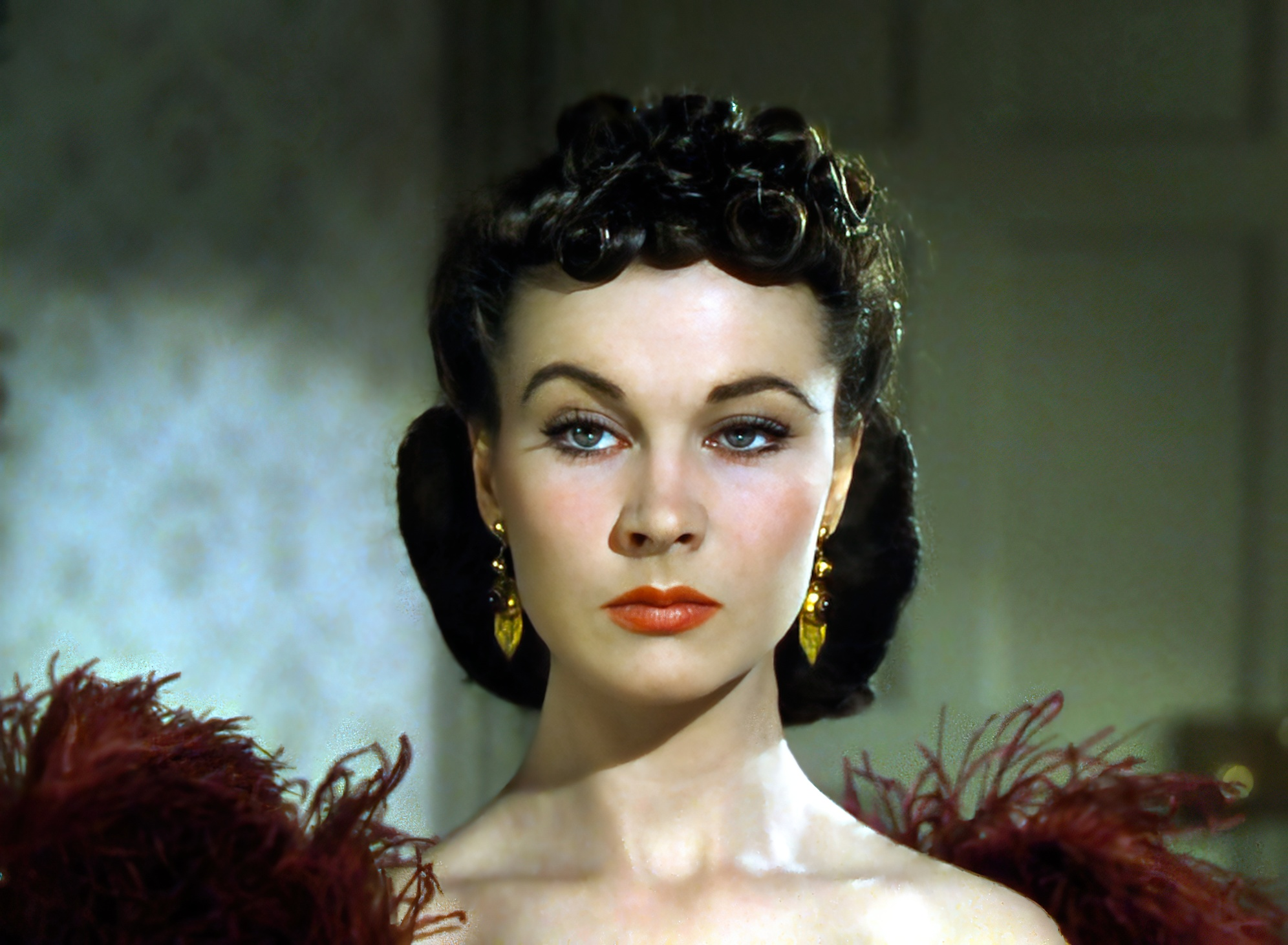
- Joseff's earrings as worn by Vivien Leigh in Gone with the Wind.
- Headquarters: Los Angeles, United States
- Website: https://www.joseff-hollywood.com/

Joseff of Hollywood is a jewelry firm founded by Eugene Joseff. The firm was particularly noted for creating costume jewelry for many of the biggest films and movie stars of the 1930s and 1940s, including Shirley Temple in The Little Princess, Vivien Leigh in Gone with the Wind and Elizabeth Taylor in Cleopatra.

Much of the jewelry seen in the movies was rented to studios, rather than being sold outright. For example, the bracelets and necklace worn by Marilyn Monroe in "Diamonds Are a Girl's Best Friend" were made by Joseff's and rented to the studio. Many were designed for film studios out of a copper–gold alloy called Russian gold (rose gold), which was less reflective than polished gold and therefore not as likely to create unwanted reflections under studio lighting conditions.

Joseff was instrumental in convincing film studios in the 1930s to use more costumes appropriate to the historial period, including jewelry that was historically relevant.

== Family ==
Eugene Joseff (September 25, 1905, Chicago – September 18, 1948), aka Joseff of Hollywood, was born into a family of Austrian descent. He died in a plane crash. His widow, Joan Castle Joseff, owned the company until her death in 2010. The next generation took over the family business upon her death.

== Aerospace parts ==
Until 2018, the business also had an aerospace branch that did precision investment casting of parts for machinery and aircraft with the other company founded by Joseff, Precision Investment Castings.
