= Mac Norton =

French vaudeville performance artist

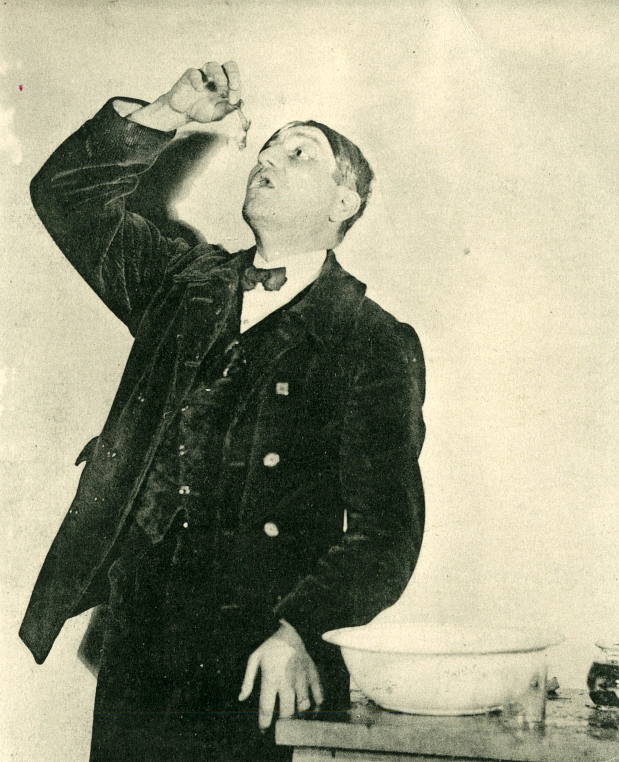
- Born: Claude Louis Delair; 1876; Lyon, France
- Died: 1953 (aged 76–77)
- Other names: "The Human Aquarium"
- Occupation: Vaudeville performance artist

Claude Louis Delair (1876 – 1953) was a French vaudeville performance artist and magician known as Mac Norton. He was called "The Human Aquarium" for his controlled regurgitation of live animals including fish, turtles and frogs as well as his ability to water spout.

== Career ==
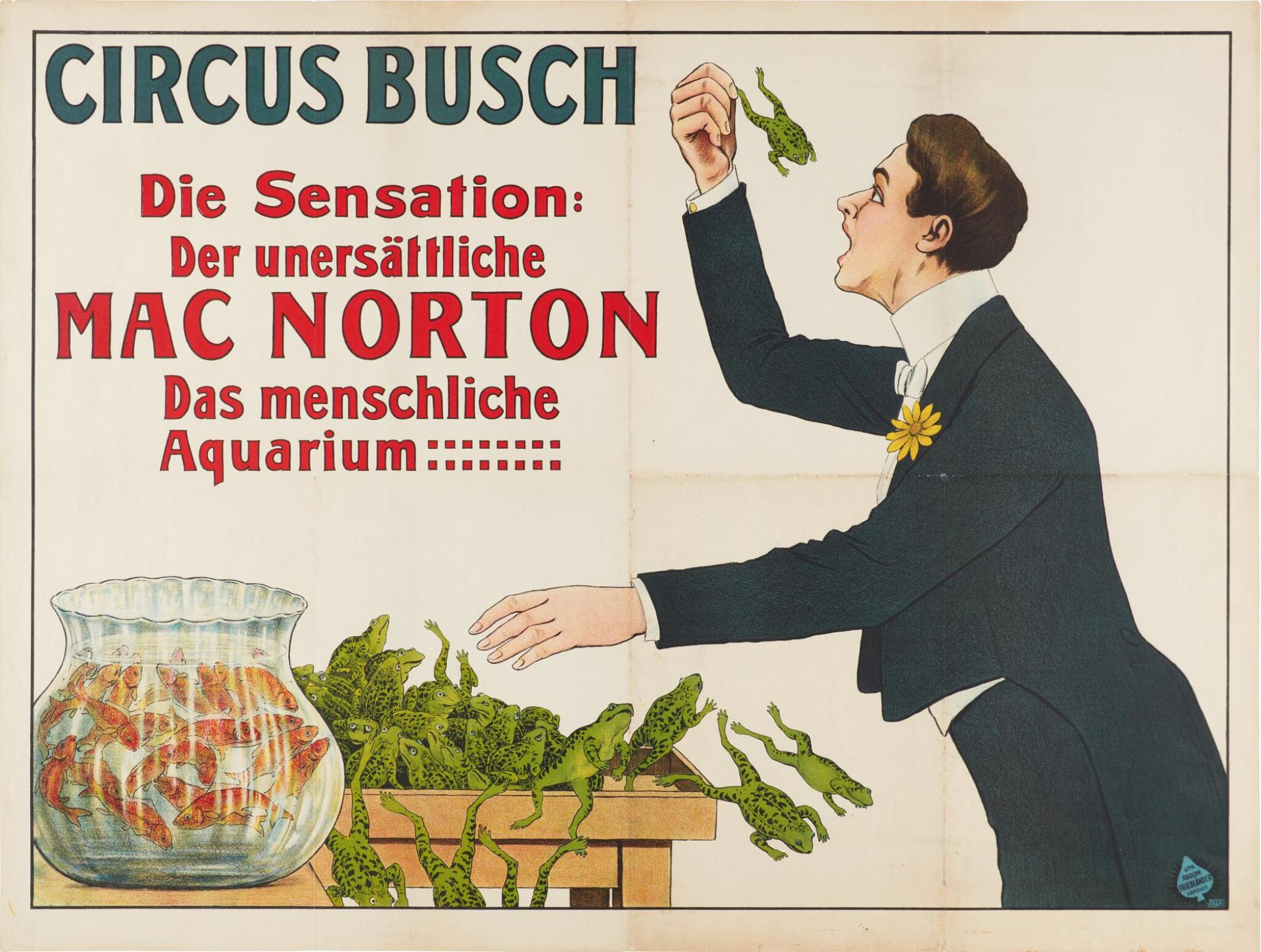
A circus poster promoting "The Aquarium Man"

Delair was born in 1876 in Lyon, France. He began his vaudeville career in 1894 as a singer. He reportedly took the name Mac Norton after a bodyguard of Mary Queen of Scots. He later began his career in the regurgitation act. He was able to drink gallons of water and regurgitate it at will. He could control the force of the stream of water and could gently press it out to wash his hands or force it out rapidly.

Delair became known as the "Human Aquarium" when he began swallowing frogs, goldfish, and turtles. He could keep turtles and frogs alive in his body for approximately two hours. He traveled to Paris, Brussels, Antwerp and Russia. Delair performed in front of leaders such as Nicholas II of Russia. In 1915 and 1916 he traveled to South America, but never visited the United States because of objections from the American Society for the Prevention of Cruelty to Animals.

Harry Houdini noted in his book Miracle Mongers and Their Methods that on one occasion Delair had lost count of the animals he swallowed and feared he had digested a frog. Houdini also wrote that Delair was the only frog swallower who performed their act in a "dignified manner".

== Death ==
Delair died in 1953 at the age of 77.

== See also ==
- Performance artist
- Professional regurgitation
