= Costume jewelry =

Jewelry used to complement a particular costume

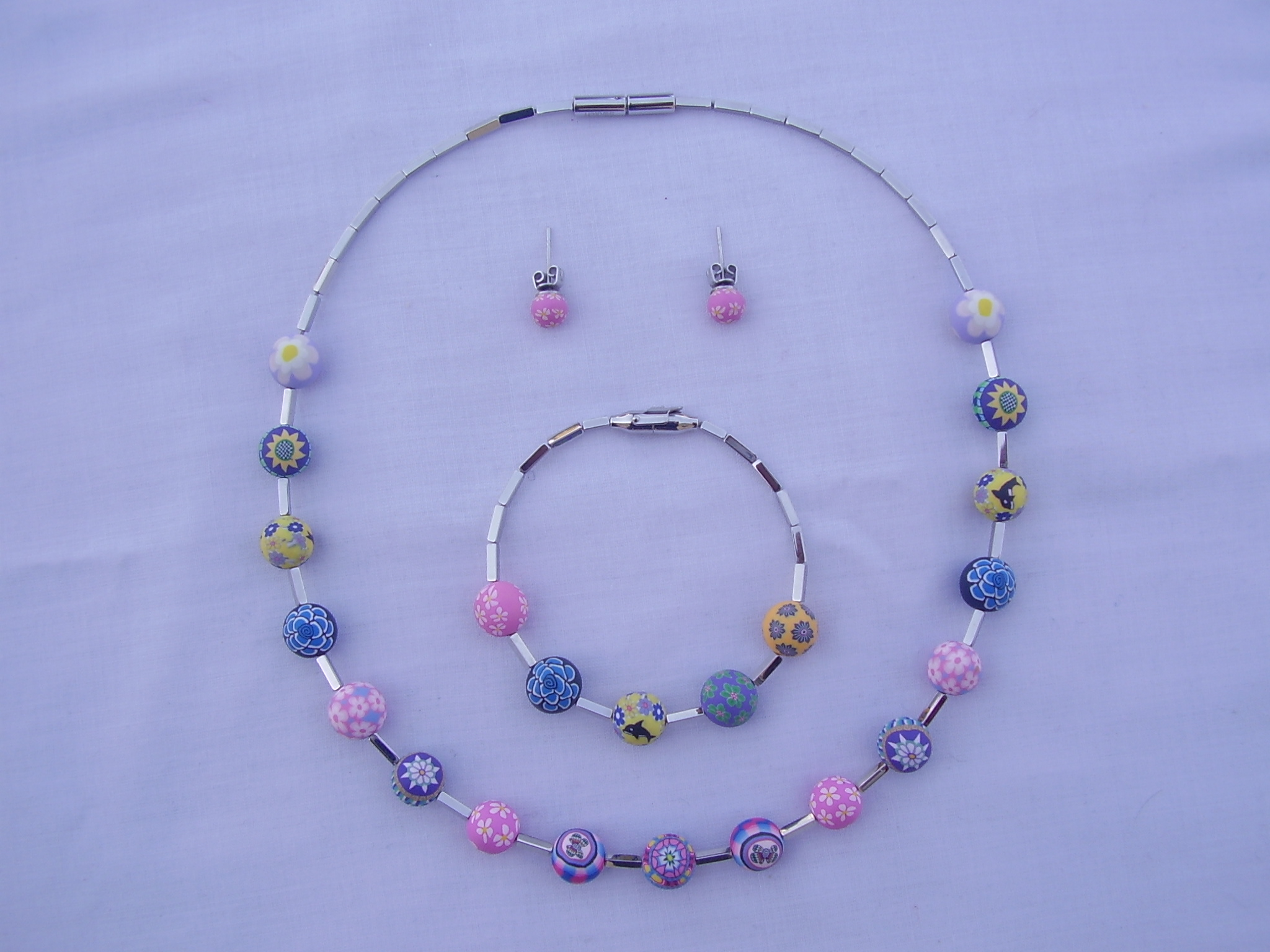
Swatch Bijoux Jewelry

Costume or fashion jewelry includes a wide range of decorative articles worn for personal adornment that are made and used to complement a particular outfit or garment at lower expense than "real" (fine) jewelry, which is more costly and may be regarded primarily as collectibles, keepsakes, or investments rather than worn. From the outset, costume jewelry has paralleled the styles of its more precious fine counterparts.

== Terminology ==
It is also known as artificial jewellery, imitation jewellery, imitated jewelry, trinkets, fashion jewelry, junk jewelry, fake jewelry, or fallalery.

== Etymology ==
The term costume jewelry dates back to the early 20th century. It reflects the use of the word costume to refer to what is now called an outfit.

== Components ==
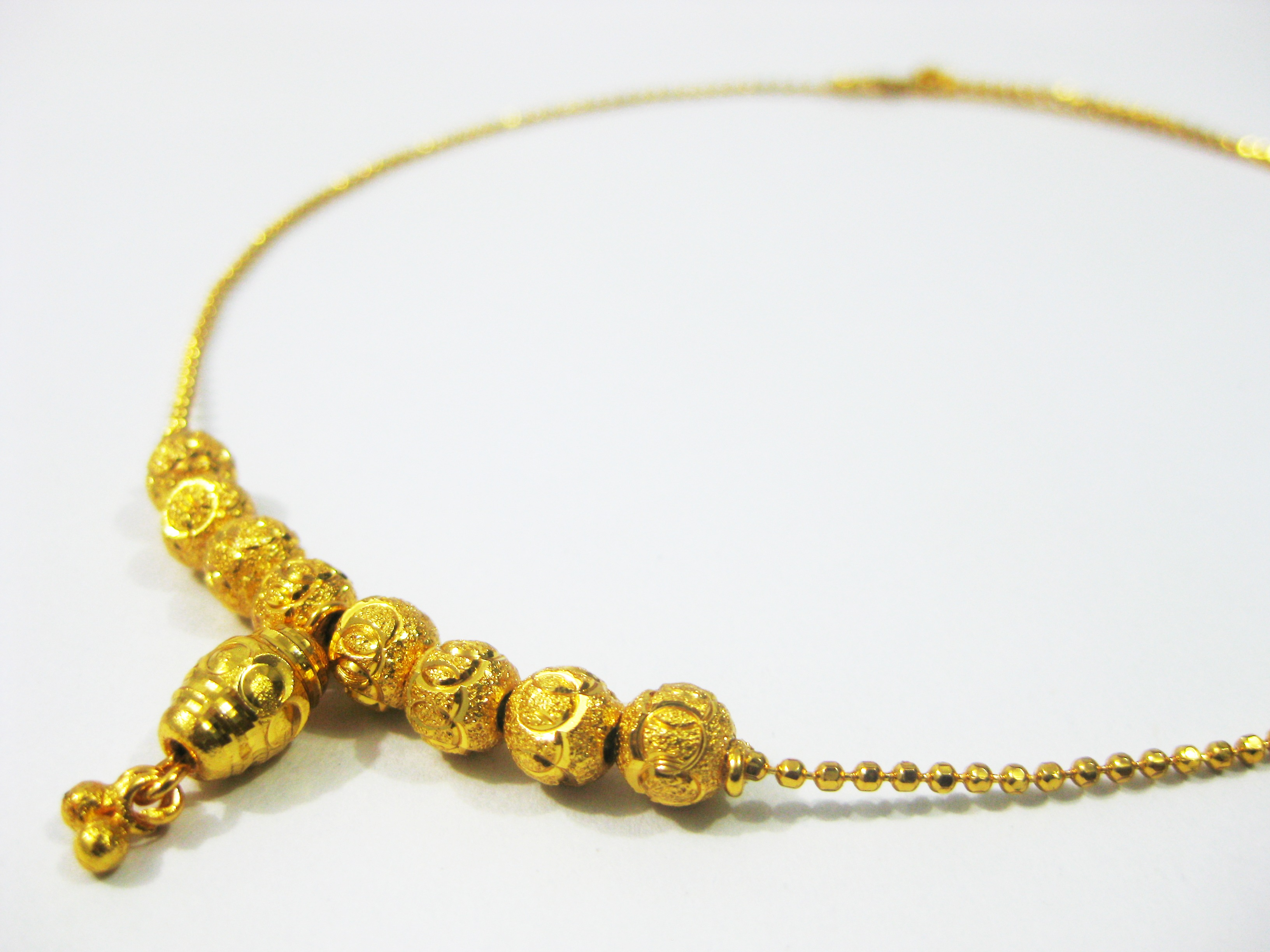
An example of gold-plated jewelry

Originally, costume or fashion jewelry was made of inexpensive simulated gemstones, such as rhinestones or lucite, set in pewter, silver, nickel, or brass. During the depression years, some manufacturers even downgraded rhinestones to meet the cost of production.

During the World War II era, sterling silver was often incorporated into costume jewelry designs primarily because:

1. The components used for base metal were needed for wartime production (i.e., military applications), and a ban was placed on their use in the private sector.
2. Base metal was originally popular because it could approximate platinum's color, sterling silver fulfilled the same function.

This resulted in some years during which sterling silver costume jewelry was produced and some can still be found in today's vintage jewelry marketplace.

Modern costume jewelry incorporates a wide range of materials. High-end crystals, cubic zirconia simulated diamonds, and some semi-precious stones are used in place of precious stones. Metals include gold- or silver-plated brass, and sometimes vermeil or sterling silver. Lower-priced jewelry may still use gold plating over pewter, nickel, or other metals; some pieces incorporate plastic, acrylic, leather, or wood.

Some low-cost jewelry has been found to contain toxic metals such as lead.

== Historical expression ==
Costume jewelry can be characterized by the period in history in which it was made.

=== Art Deco period (1920–1930s) ===
The Art Deco movement attempted to combine the harshness of mass production with the sensitivity of art and design. The movement died with the onset of the Great Depression and the outbreak of World War II.

According to Schiffer, some of the characteristics of the costume jewelry in the Art Deco period were:

- Free-flowing curves were replaced with a harshly geometric and symmetrical theme
- Long pendants, bangle bracelets, cocktail rings, and elaborate accessory items such as cigarette cases and holders

=== Retro period (1935 to 1950) ===
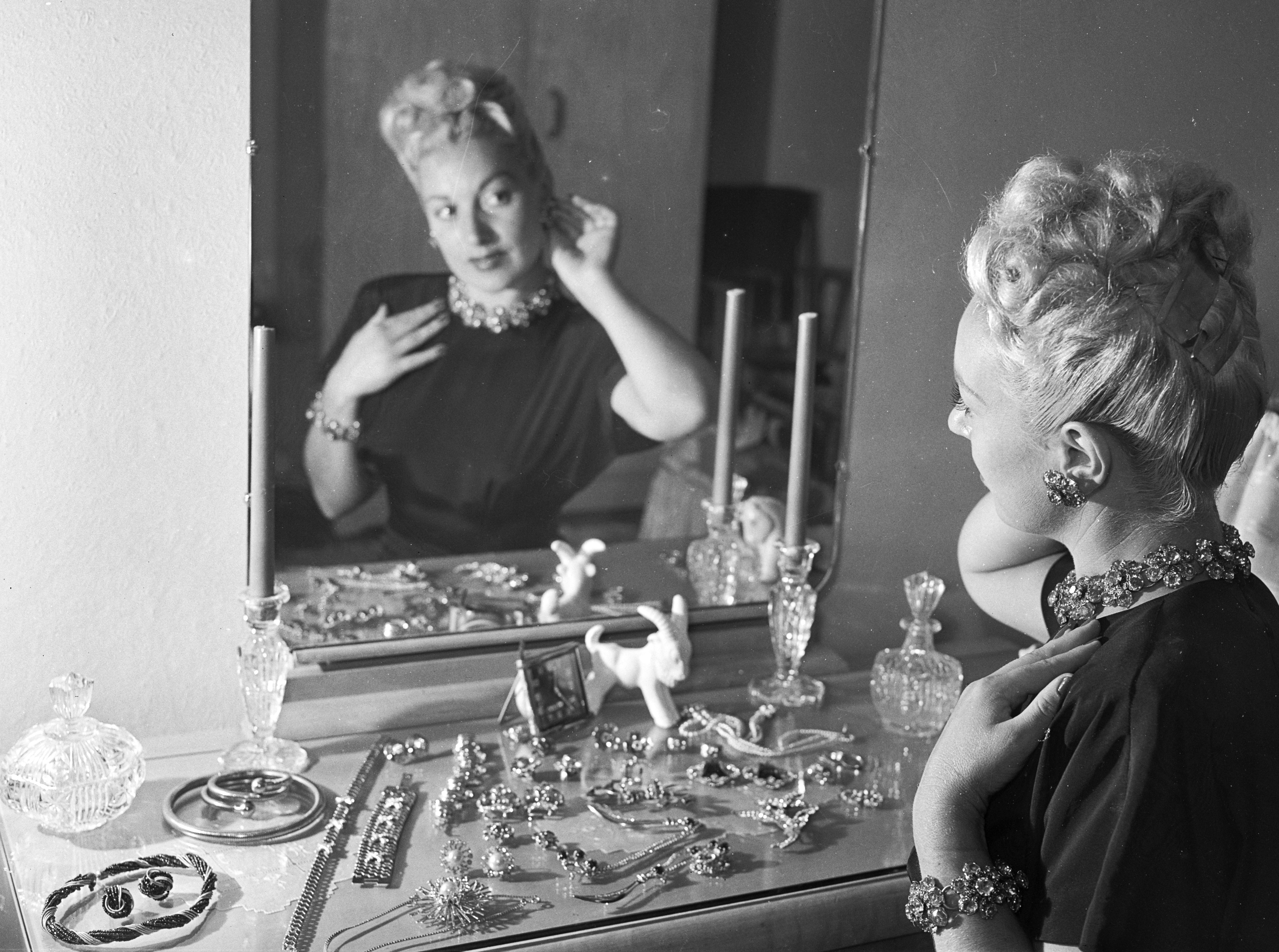
Model with display of costume jewelry, 1947

In the Retro period, designers struggled with the art versus mass production dilemma. Natural materials merged with plastics. The retro period primarily included American-made jewelry with a distinctly American look. With the war in Europe, many European jewelry firms were forced to shut down. Many European designers emigrated to the U.S. since the economy was recovering.

According to Schiffer, some of the characteristics of costume jewelry in the Retro period were:

- Glamour, elegance, and sophistication
- Flowers, bows, and sunburst designs with a Hollywood flair
- Moonstones, horse motifs, military influence, and ballerinas
- Bakelite and other plastic jewelry

=== Art Modern period (1945 to 1960) ===
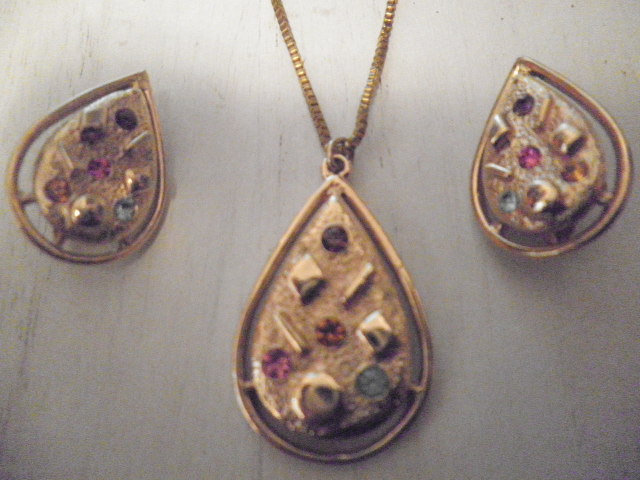
Sarah Coventry 1959 "Sultana" jewelry set

In the Art Modern period following World War II, jewelry designs became more traditional and understated. The big, bold styles of the Retro period went out of style and were replaced by the more tailored styles of the 1950s and 1960s.

According to Schiffer, some of the characteristics of costume jewelry in the Art Modern period were:

- Bold, lavish jewelry
- Large, chunky bracelets, charm bracelets, Jade/opal, citrine and topaz
- Poodle pins, Christmas tree pins, and other Christmas jewelry
- Rhinestones

With the advent of the Mod period came "Body Jewelry". Carl Schimel of Kim Craftsmen Jewelry was at the forefront of this style. While Kim Craftsmen closed in the early 1990s, many collectors still forage for their items at antique shows and flea markets.

== General history ==
Costume jewelry has been part of the culture for almost 300 years. During the 18th century, jewelers began making pieces with inexpensive glass. In the 19th century, costume jewelry made of semi-precious material came into the market. Jewels made of semi-precious material were more affordable, allowing common people to own costume jewelry.

However, the real golden era for costume jewelry began in the middle of the 20th century. The new middle class wanted beautiful, but affordable jewelry. The demand for jewelry of this type coincided with the machine age and the Industrial Revolution. The revolution made the production of carefully executed replicas of admired heirloom pieces possible.

As the class structure in America changed, so did measures of real wealth. Women in all social stations, even working-class women, could own a small piece of costume jewelry. The average town and countrywoman could acquire and wear a considerable amount of this mass-produced jewelry that was both affordable and stylish.

Costume jewelry was also made popular by various designers in the mid-20th century. Some of the most remembered names in costume jewelry include both the high and low priced brands: Crown Trifari, Dior, Chanel, Miriam Haskell, Sherman, Monet, Napier, Corocraft, Coventry, and Kim Craftsmen.

A significant factor in the popularization of costume jewelry was Hollywood movies. The leading female stars of the 1940s and 1950s often wore and endorsed the pieces produced by various designers. If you admired a necklace worn by Bette Davis in The Private Lives of Elizabeth and Essex, you could buy a copy from Joseff of Hollywood, who made the original. Stars such as Vivien Leigh, Elizabeth Taylor, and Jane Russell appeared in adverts for the pieces and the availability of the collections in shops such as Woolworth made it possible for ordinary women to own and wear such jewelry.

Coco Chanel greatly popularized the use of faux jewelry in her years as a fashion designer, bringing costume jewelry to life with gold and faux pearls. Chanel's designs drew from various historical styles, including Byzantine and Renaissance influences, often featuring crosses and intricate metalwork. Her collaboration with glassmakers, such as the Gripoix family, introduced richly colored glass beads and simulated gemstones, which added depth to her creations without the high cost of traditional precious stones. Kenneth Jay Lane has since the 1960s been known for creating unique pieces for Jackie Onassis, Elizabeth Taylor, Diana Vreeland, and Audrey Hepburn. He is probably best known for his three-strand faux pearl necklace worn by Barbara Bush to her husband's inaugural ball. Celebrated names who wore Lane's creations include Jackie Kennedy, Babe Paley, the Duchess of Windsor, and Nancy Reagan.

Elsa Schiaparelli brought surrealist influences into costume jewelry design, collaborating with artists such as Salvador Dalí.

In many instances, high-end fashion jewelry has achieved a "collectible" status and increased value over time. Today, there is a substantial secondary market for vintage fashion jewelry. The main collecting market is for 'signed pieces', which have the maker's mark, usually stamped on the reverse. Amongst the most sought after are Miriam Haskell, Sherman, Coro, Butler and Wilson, Crown Trifari, and Sphinx. However, there is also demand for good quality 'unsigned' pieces, especially if they are of an unusual design.

== Business and industry ==
Costume jewelry is considered a discrete category of fashion accessory and displays many characteristics of a self-contained industry. Costume jewelry manufacturers are located throughout the world, with a particular concentration in parts of China and India, where the trade of these goods dominates entire citywide and region-wide economies. There has been considerable controversy in the United States and elsewhere about the lack of regulations in the manufacture of such jewelry—these range from human rights issues surrounding the treatment of labor, to the use of manufacturing processes in which small, but potentially harmful, amounts of toxic metals are added during production. In 2010, the Associated Press released the story that toxic levels of the metal cadmium were found in children's jewelry. An Associated Press investigation found some pieces contained more than 80 percent of cadmium. The broader issues surrounding imports, exports, trade laws, and globalization also apply to the costume jewelry trade.

As part of the supply chain, wholesalers in the United States and other nations purchase costume jewelry from manufacturers. They typically import or export it to wholesale distributors and suppliers who deal directly with retailers. Wholesale costume jewelry merchants traditionally seek new suppliers at trade shows. The trade-show model has changed as the Internet has become increasingly important in global trade. Retailers can now select from many wholesalers with sites on the World Wide Web. The wholesalers purchase from international suppliers available on the Web from different parts of the world, like Chinese, Korean, Indonesian, Thai, and Indian jewelry companies, with their wide range of products in bulk quantities. Some sites also market directly to consumers who can purchase costume jewelry at significantly reduced prices. Some websites categorize fashion jewelry separately, while others use this term instead of costume jewelry. The trend of jewelry-making at home by hobbyists for personal enjoyment or sale on sites like Etsy has resulted in the common practice of buying wholesale costume jewelry in bulk and using it for parts.

There is a rise in demand for artificial or imitation jewelry by 85% due to the increase in gold prices, according to a 2011 report.

== See also ==
- Marcasite jewelry
- Gustave Sherman
