= Regurgitation (digestion) =

Type of eating behaviour

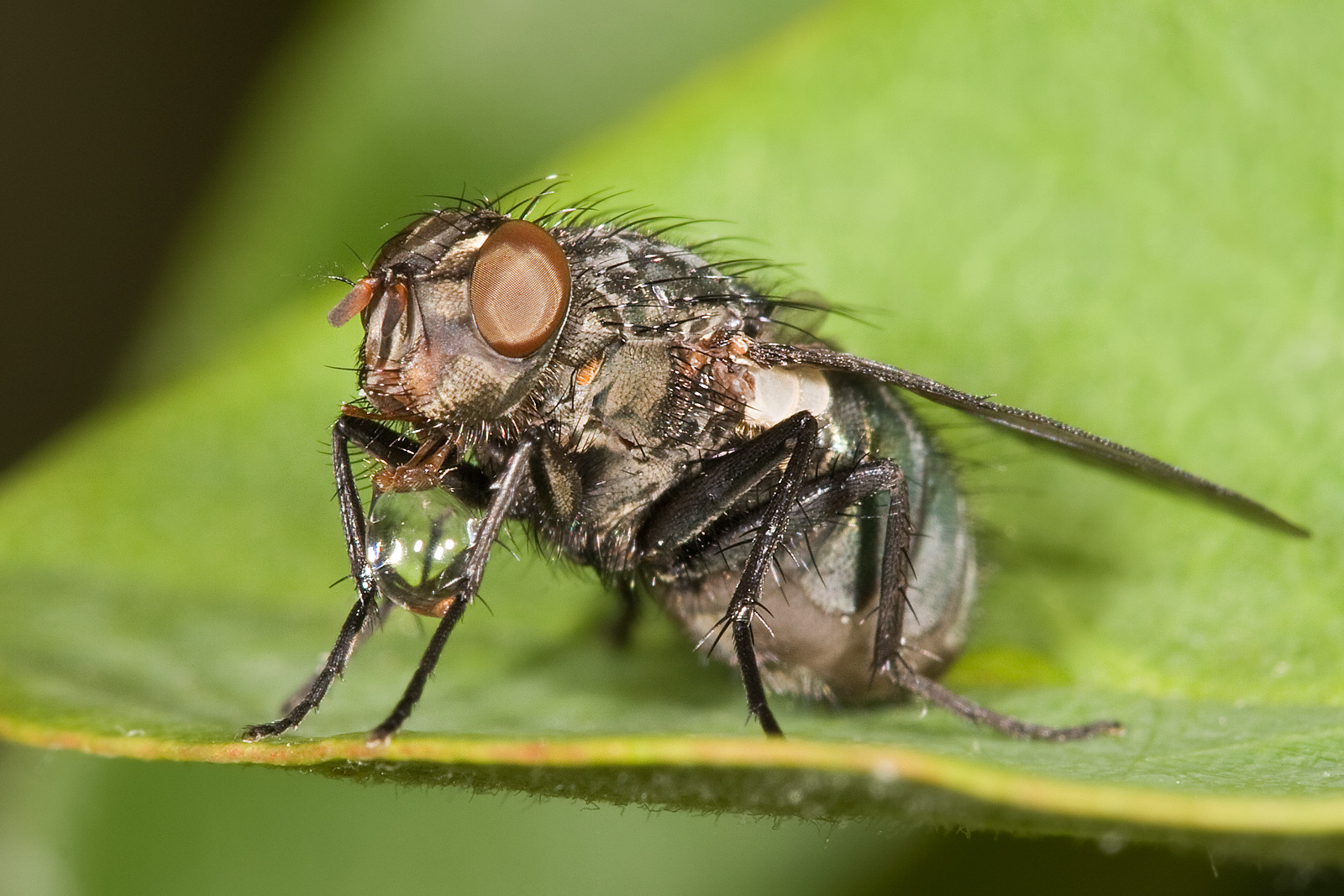
Flesh fly, from the family Sarcophagidae "blowing a bubble". One explanation for this behaviour is that it concentrates the fly's meal by the process of evaporation. The diet of the flesh fly is very high in water content. The fly regurgitates the liquid portion of the food, holds it while evaporation reduces the water content and the fly then swallows a much more concentrated meal without the water content. This continues until sufficient amount of liquid is left for the fly. – Australian Museum

Regurgitation is the retrograde movement of digestive tract content back into the pharynx and oral cavity, usually characterized by the presence of incompletely digested food, digestive juices and, in the case of gastrointestinal diseases, blood (i.e.hematemesis). The regurgitated content might then the be expelled by vomiting or spitting, or re-swallowed back down the esophagus.

Regurgitation can be a normal and voluntary physiological behavior in animals, unlike the complex vomiting reflex in response to toxins. Honeybees, for example, regurgitate partly digested nectar in the form of honey and store it as food inside the beehive for later consumption. Many grazing herbivores (especially graminivores such as bovines and sheep) also routinely regurgitate boluses of ingested plant materials (known as cud) back into the mouth for repeated chewing in order to better break down the tough and otherwise non-bioavailable cellulose — a process known as rumination. Some predatory birds such as owls also regurgitate pellets to expel indigestible matter such as bones and feathers of swallowed prey. Vultures, who secrete strong gastric acid to sterilize bacteria-laden carrion, even use regurgitation and projectile vomiting as a chemical defense against threats from potential predators.

Regurgitation is also used by many species of non-mammalian animals, particularly birds, to feed their young who are not yet mature enough to procure food for themselves, so a parent must leave the nest to forage or hunt for food, especially under circumstances where the procured food is too large, heavy or scattered to be carried back in one trip, or vulnerable to robbery/theft by other predators during the transport. In such scenarios, the foraging parent will tear up and ingest the food, store it inside an esophageal pouch known as the crop, return to the nest and then regurgitate the food out to feed the young.

== Humans ==
Regurgitation can be voluntary or involuntary for humans. It can occur alongside gastroesophageal reflux disease (GERD), acid reflux and some anatomical abnormalities. In infants however, regurgitation – or spitting up – is quite common, with 67% of 4-month-old infants spitting up more than once per day. Chronic, involuntary regurgitation of ingesta following ingestion, commonly known as rumination syndrome, is a rare and often misdiagnosed disorder.

Some people are able to regurgitate without using any external stimulation or drug, by means of muscle control. Practitioners of yoga have also been known to do this. Professional regurgitators perfect the ability to such a degree as to be able to exploit it as entertainment.

== Birds ==
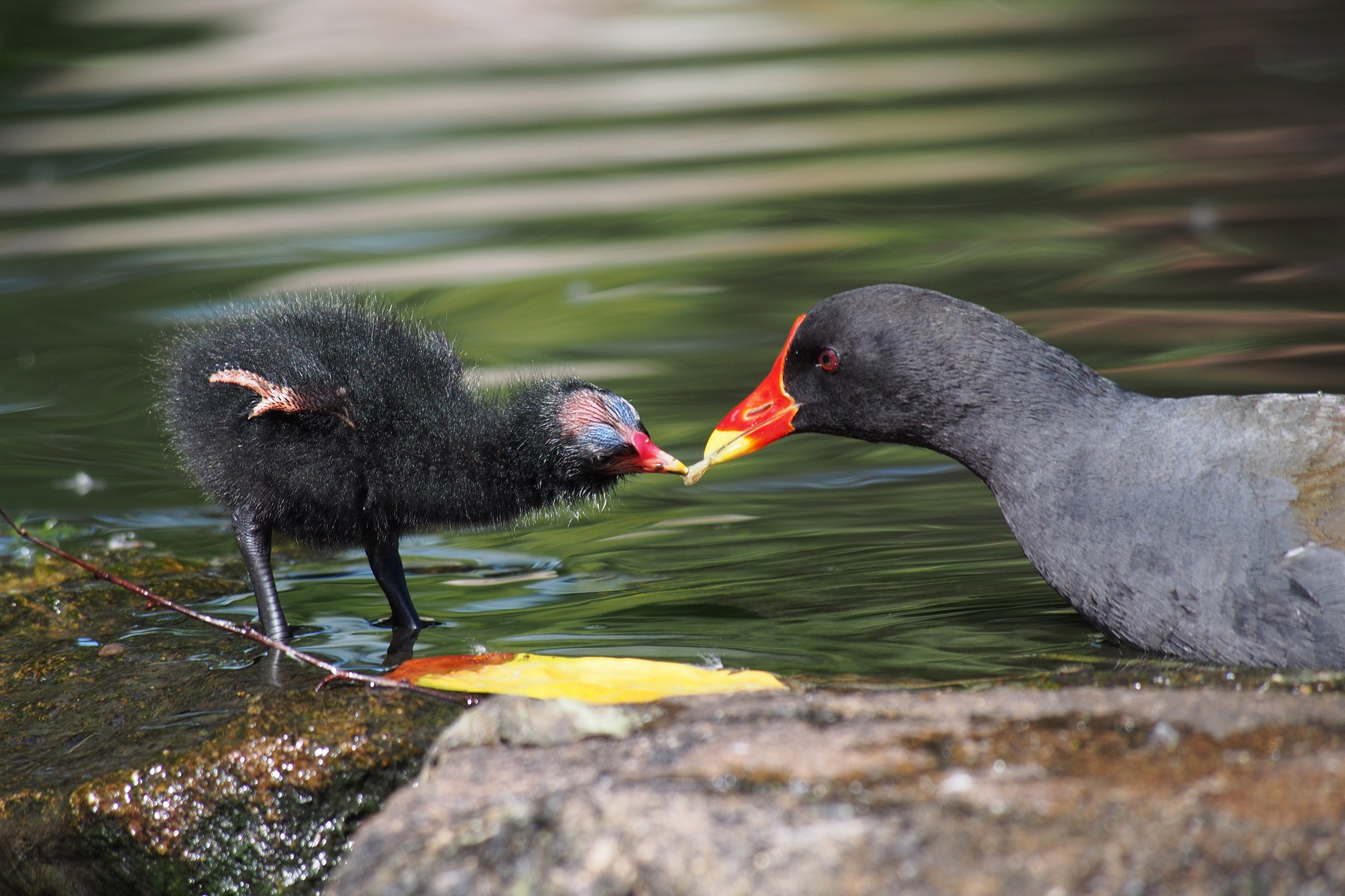
Moorhen chick being fed regurgitated food by an adult

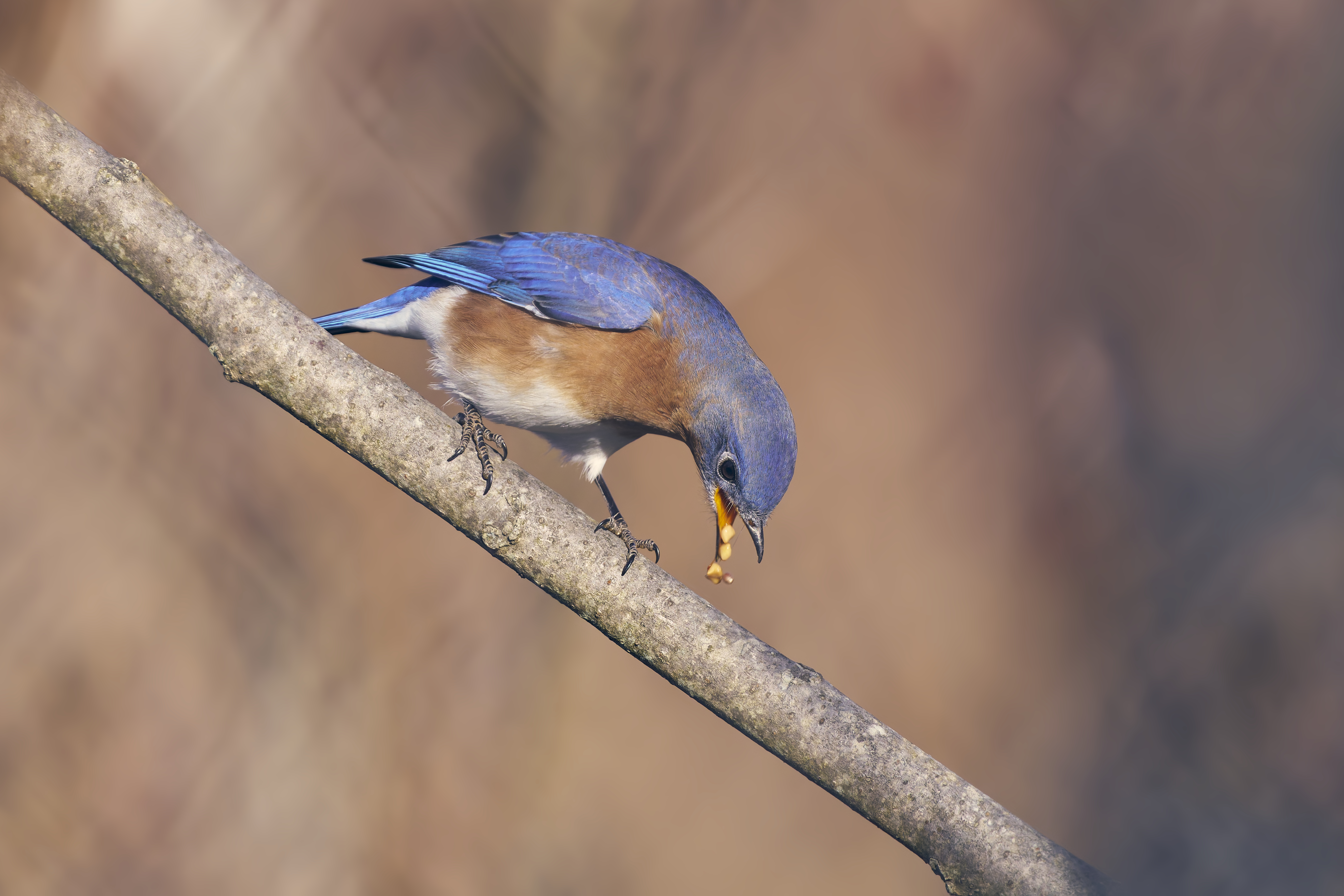
Eastern Bluebird regurgitating food

For birds that transport food to their mates and/or their young over long distances — especially seabirds — it is impractical to carry food in their bills because of the risk that it would be stolen by other birds, such as frigatebirds, skuas and gulls. Such birds often employ a regurgitative feeding strategy. Many species of gulls have an orange to red spot near the end of the bill (called a "subterminal spot") that the chicks peck in order to stimulate regurgitation.

All of the Suliformes employ a regurgitative strategy to feed their young. In some species — such as the blue-footed booby, masked booby, and the Nazca booby — a brood hierarchy exists, in which the older chick is fed before the younger, subordinate chick. In times when food is scarce, siblicide may occur, where the dominant chick kills its younger sibling in order to sequester all of the resources of the parents. Penguins chicks are fed regurgitated food by both parents. Researchers found that the practice may potentially cause metabolic alkalosis in certain penguins.

Some birds, such as fulmars, employ regurgitation as a defense when threatened.

== Other animals ==
Ruminants regurgitate their food as a normal part of digestion. During their idle time, they chew the regurgitated food (cud) and swallow it again, which increases digestibility by reducing particle size.

Honey is produced by a process of regurgitation by honey bees, which is stored in the beehive as a primary food source.

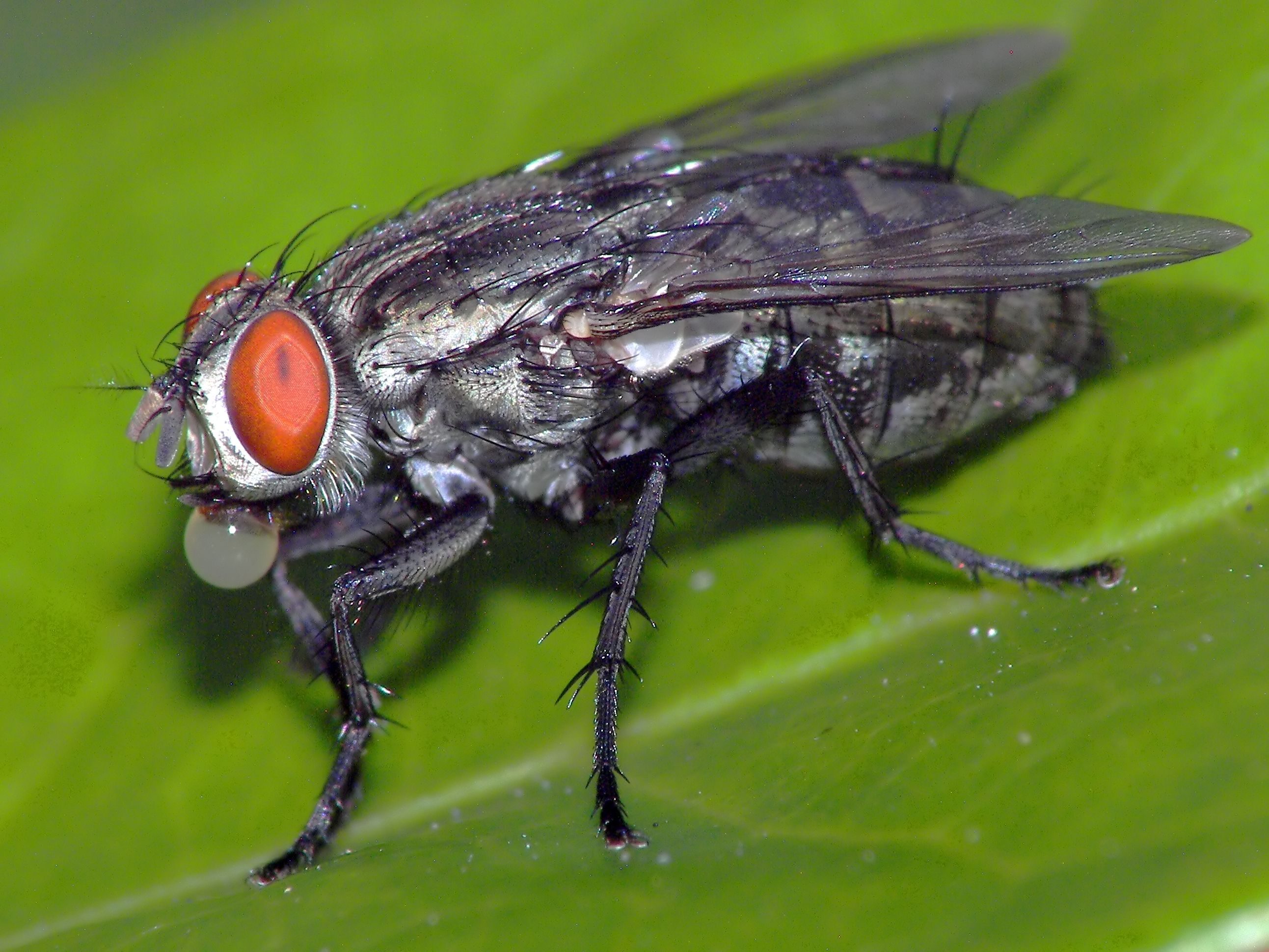
Bubbling fly

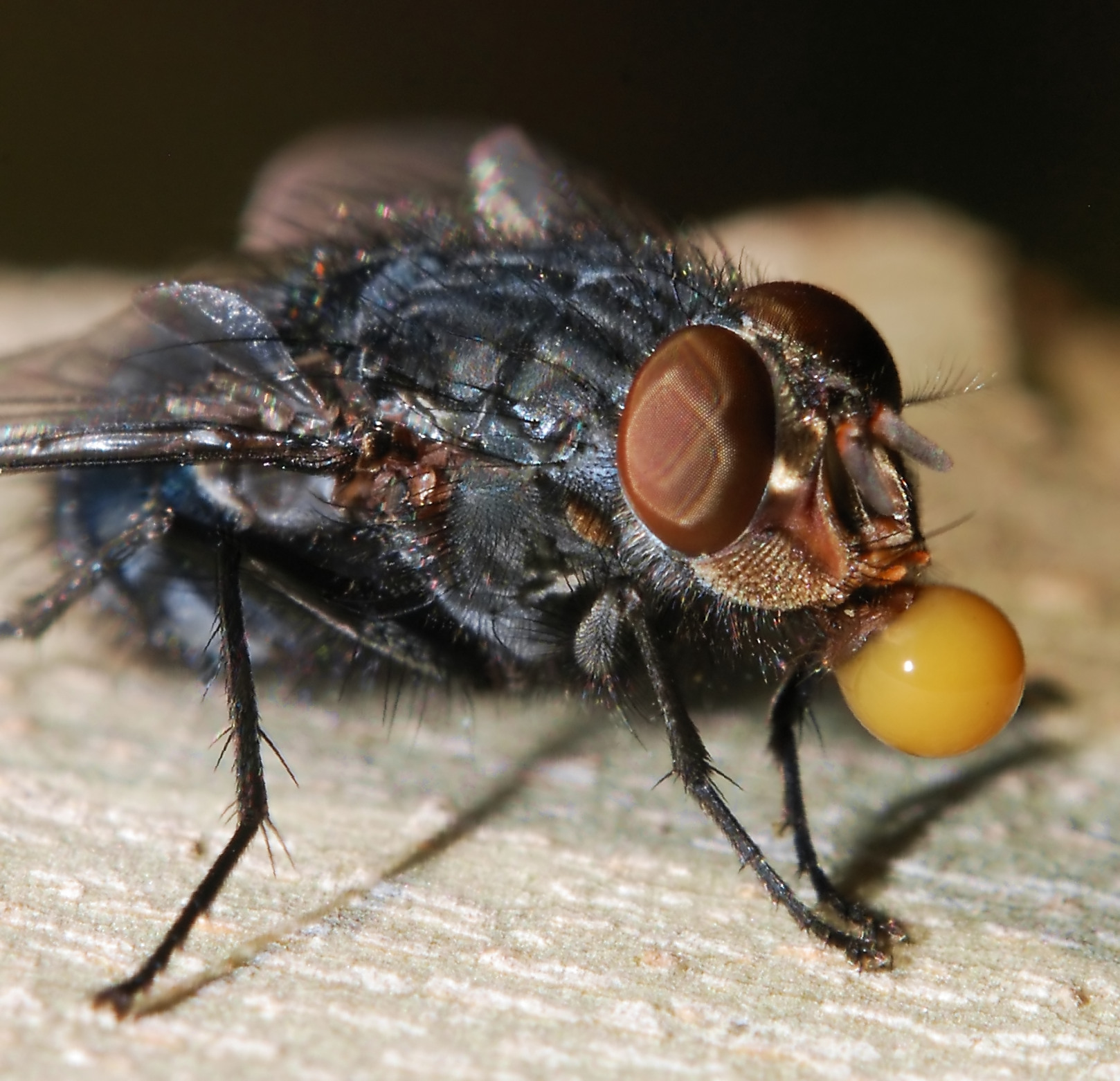
Bubbling fly (Calliphora vicina)

Pollenia sp. blowing bubbles (video, 3m 1s)

== See also ==
- Trophallaxis
