= Corocraft =

American costume jewelry company

Coro is an American costume jewelry company. It started doing business in 1901, producing jewelry under several brand names, including Corocraft. Some of their more notable products include the Coro Duettes, Coro Tremblers, Coro Door Knockers and Coro Crown Pins. The Coro company went out of business in 1979.

== History ==
In 1901, Emanuel Cohn and Carl Rosenberger established the accessories boutique Cohn and Rosenberger in New York City, which was later shortened to Coro. In 1929, Coro purchased a manufacturing facility in Providence, Rhode Island, which would later become the world's largest costume jewelry facility.

== Literature ==
- Carla Ginelli Brunialti and Roberto Brunialti: American Costume Jewelry 1935 - 1950. Mazzotta, Milano 1997. ISBN 88-202-1256-0

== Sources ==
- Coro & Corocraft Jewelry Reference Information and History @ Collectics Antiques & Collectibles
- The History and Marks of Coro Jewelry
