= Joan Castle Joseff =

American jeweler (1912–2010)

- Joan Castle Joseff, from a 1965 newspaper
- Born: Gladys Ellice Joan Castle; August 12, 1912; Cochrane, Alberta, Canada
- Died: March 24, 2010 (aged 97); Burbank, California
- Occupation(s): Jeweler, businesswoman
- Known for: Owner, Joseff of Hollywood (1948 to 2010)

Joan Castle "J. C." Joseff (August 12, 1912 – March 24, 2010) was an American jeweler and businesswoman, owner of Joseff of Hollywood and Joseff Precision Metal Products from 1948 to 2010.

== Early life ==
Gladys Ellice Joan Castle was born in Cochrane, Alberta and raised in Oregon, the daughter of Edgar W. Castle and Lottie Elizabeth Coates Castle. Her father was born in the United States, and her mother was born in England. She earned a bachelor's degree in psychology from the University of California, Los Angeles.

== Career ==
Castle began working at Joseff of Hollywood as a secretary, and in time married the owner. She was a widow with a small son when she took over her husband's businesses in 1948, and continued both. Joseff of Hollywood researched, created and rented jewelry for the film industry, and under her leadership, also for television programs, including Queen for a Day and I Love Lucy. She also launched a retail line of Joseff jewelry, sold in department stores nationwide, and represented her company's aesthetic in publicity stills with movie stars.

She also ran Joseff Precision Metal Products, which made precision parts for aviation and aerospace manufacturers, beginning during World War II. "Making precision parts and precision jewelry is very similar," she assured The New York Times in a 1950 profile. In 1958, she was named Successful Business Woman by the Los Angeles chapter of the National Association of Accountants. She never officially resigned the position of president, but in the 1990s her daughter-in-law Tina Joseff became general manager of the family businesses.

Joseff was active in the Los Angeles Chamber of Commerce and in Republican Party politics; she twice served as a delegate to the Republican National Convention. In 2004, the Republican National Congressional Committee's Business Advisory Council named Joseff "Businesswoman of the Year".

== Personal life ==
Joan Castle married Eugene Joseff in 1942. Their son Jeffrey was born in 1947. Eugene Joseff died in a plane crash in 1948. Joan Joseff lived in Toluca Lake, and died in 2010, aged 97 years, in Burbank. In 2017, over 600 pieces of Joseff jewelry, many seen in classic films, were sold at auction in Los Angeles.
